= List of awards and nominations received by Jessica Simpson =

Jessica Simpson awards and nominations
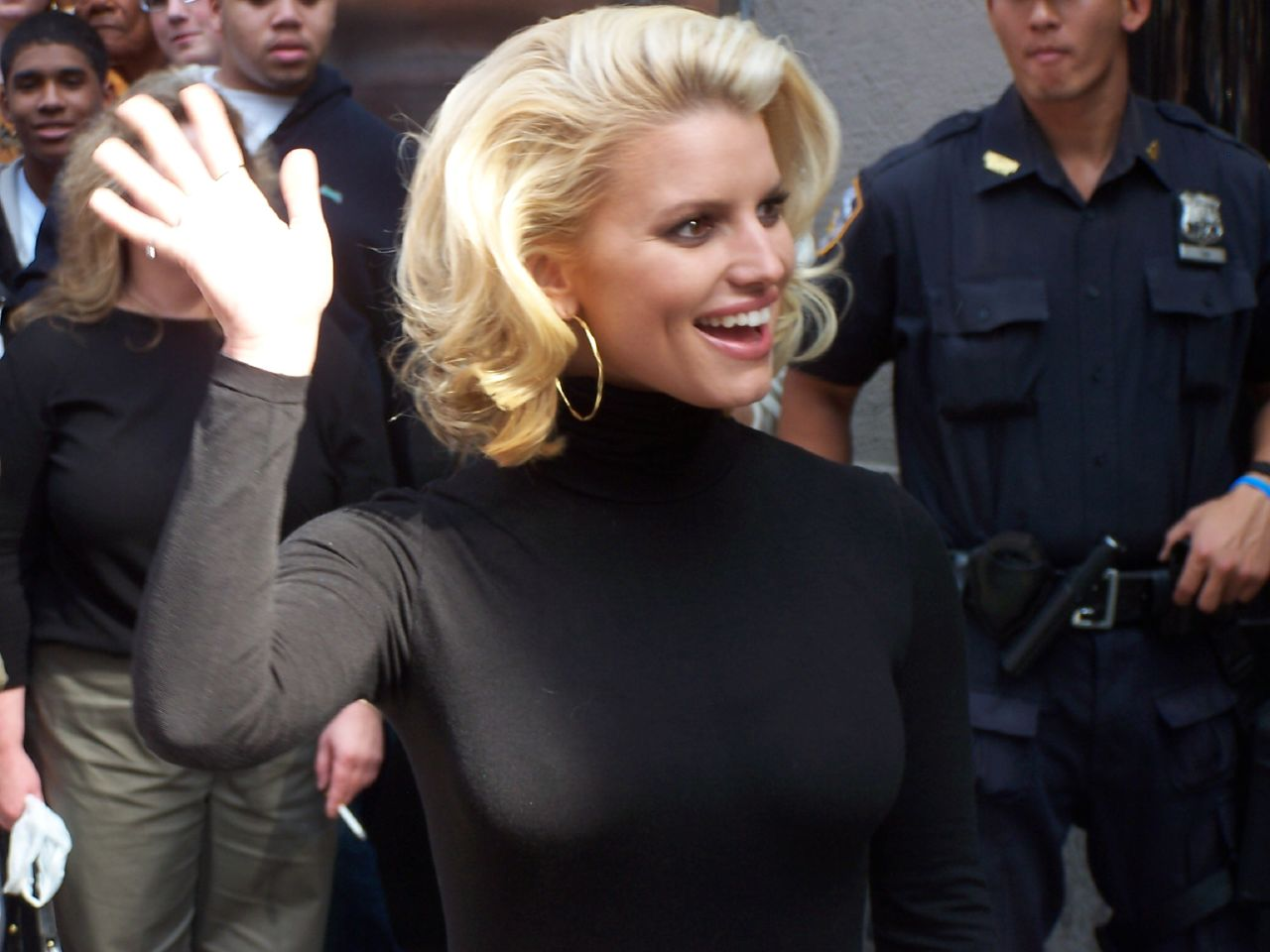
- Simpson in 2006
Awards and nominations
Award	Wins	Nominations
American Music Awards	0	3
MTV VMA	0	2
Nickelodeon Kids' Choice	0	1
People's Choice	2	3
Teen Choice	6	24
World Music	0	1
MTV Movie & TV Awards	0	2

Totals (Note: Certain award groups do not simply award one winner. They acknowledge several different recipients, have runners-up, and have third place. Since this is a specific recognition and is different from losing an award, runner-up mentions are considered wins in this award tally. For simplification and to avoid errors, each award in this list has been presumed to have had a prior nomination.)
- Wins: 25
- Nominations: 71

This is the list of Awards and Nominations received by Singer, Actress, and Fashion Designer Jessica Simpson.

During her earlier career, Simpson became known for her relationship and later marriage to Nick Lachey, with whom she appeared on the MTV reality television series Newlyweds: Nick and Jessica between 2003 and 2005. Following the release of her first Christmas album ReJoyce: The Christmas Album (2004), which was certified gold, Simpson made her film debut as Daisy Duke in The Dukes of Hazzard (2005), for which she recorded a cover of "These Boots Are Made for Walkin'" for the film's soundtrack. In 2006, she released her fifth studio album A Public Affair and appeared in the romantic comedy film Employee of the Month. With the release of her sixth studio album Do You Know (2008), Simpson moved into the country music genre. Simpson has been nominated for three American Music Awards, two MTV Video Music Awards, and a CMT Music Award.

Simpson made her film debut as Daisy Duke in the film adaption of The Dukes of Hazzard (2005). While the film was met with generally negative reviews from film critics, it went on to gross over $111 million worldwide. Simpson recorded the song "These Boots Are Made For Walkin'" (2005) to promote the film; it both samples and shares the title of a Nancy Sinatra song. The song entered the top twenty of the Billboard Hot 100, becoming one Simpson's most successful singles to date.

Aside from her musical pursuits, Simpson launched The Jessica Simpson Collection in 2005, a fashion line of clothing and other items. The brand has gone on to earn over $1 billion in revenue and is regarded as one of the most successful celebrity-founded brands in history. She also starred on the reality television series The Price of Beauty in 2010, was a judge on two seasons of Fashion Star between 2012 and 2013, and published a memoir in 2020, Open Book, which reached number one on The New York Times Best Seller list.

== Awards and nominations ==
Name of the award ceremony, year presented, award category, nominee(s) of the award and the result of the nomination
Award	Year (Note: Indicates the year of ceremony. Each year is linked to the article about the awards held that year, wherever possible.)	Recipient(s)	Category	Result	Ref.
American Music Awards	2001	Herself	Favorite Pop/Rock New Artist	Nominated	
American Music Awards	2004	Herself	Favorite Pop/Rock Female Artist	Nominated	
American Music Awards	2004	In This Skin	Favorite Pop/Rock Album	Nominated	
Ascap Pop Awards	2005	With You	Most Performed Songs	Won	
Basenotes Awards	2009	Fancy	Best Celebrity Women's Fragrance	Nominated	
Billboard Year-End List	2000	Herself	Top New Pop Artist	5th Place	
Billboard Year-End List	2004	Herself	Top Pop Artists – Female	6th Place	
Billboard Year-End List	2004	Herself	Hot Mainstream Top 40 Artists	5th Place	
Blockbuster Entertainment Awards	2001	Herself	Favorite Female – New Artist	Nominated	
BMI Pop Awards	2003	Irresistible		Won	
Cosmopolitan Magazine Awards	2005	Herself	Born To Design	Won	
CMT Online Awards	2008	Come On Over	"(What? I've Always Been Country) Crossover Artist"	Nominated	
Common Sense Media Award	2004	Herself	Best Musician	Nominated	
Danish Music Awards	2003	Herself	Breakthrough Artist	Nominated	
FiFi Awards	2009	Fancy	Fragrance of the Year – Women's Prestige	Nominated	
FiFi Awards	2009	Fancy	Best Packaging of the Year-Women's Popular Appeal	Nominated	
FiFi Awards	2011	I Fancy You	Best Fragrance of the Year-Broad Appeal	Won	
FiFi Awards	2011	I Fancy You	Best Packaging of the Year-Broad Appeal	Nominated	
FiFi Awards	2015	Signature	Consumer Choice – Popular	Nominated	
Footwear News Achievement Awards	2023	Herself	Icon	Honored	
Golden Raspberry Awards	2006	The Dukes of Hazzard	Worst Supporting Actress	Nominated	
Golden Raspberry Awards	2006	The Dukes of Hazzard	Worst Screen Couple (Jessica Simpson & Her "Daisy Dukes")	Nominated	
Golden Raspberry Awards	2006	Shared with Ashlee Simpson; Nick Lachey	Most Tiresome Tabloid Targets	Nominated	
Golden Raspberry Awards	2007	Employee of the Month	Worst Actress	Nominated	
Golden Schmoes Awards	2005	The Dukes of Hazzard	Best T&A of the Year	Nominated	
Gracie Awards	2010	The Price of Beauty	Dove Real Beauty Award	Won	
Groovevolt Music & Fashion Awards	2005	Take My Breath Away	Best Song Performance – Female	Nominated	
J-14 Teen Icon Awards	2008	Herself	Iconic Singer	Nominated	
Maxim Magazine	2004	Herself	Hottest Woman of the Year	Won	
MTV Video Music Awards	2004	With You	Best Pop Video	Nominated	
MTV Video Music Awards	2004	With You	Best Female Video	Nominated	
MTV Movie Awards	2006	Herself	Sexiest Performance	Nominated	
MTV Movie Awards	2006	The Dukes of Hazzard	Best On-Screen Team	Nominated	
Nickelodeon Kids Choice Awards	2007	Herself	Favorite Female Singer	Nominated	
People's Choice Awards	2005	Take My Breath Away	Favorite Remake	Nominated	
People's Choice Awards	2005	Newlyweds: Nick and Jessica	Favorite Reality Show Other	Won	
People's Choice Awards	2006	These Boots Are Made for Walkin'	Favorite Song from a Film	Won	
Popstars Awards	2008	Herself	Best Female Artist	Nominated	
Radio Disney Music Awards	2002	Irresistible	Best Album	Nominated	
Radio Disney Music Awards	2002	Herself	Best Female Artist	Nominated	
Radio Disney Music Awards	2003	Herself	Best Female Artist	Nominated	
Rolling Stone	2004	Herself	Influential Woman of Year	Won	
Seventeen Magazine Awards	2006	Herself	Style Star of the Year	Won	
Smash Hits Poll Winners Party	2005	Herself	Hottest Showbiz couple	Nominated	
Smash Hits Poll Winners Party	2005	Herself	Most Fanciable Female	Nominated	
Smash Hits Poll Winners Party	2005	Herself	Top Mop	Nominated	
Stinkers Bad Movie Awards	2006	The Dukes of Hazzard	Most Annoying Fake Accent (Female)	Won	
Stinkers Bad Movie Awards	2006	The Dukes of Hazzard	Worst Performance by an Actress in a Supporting Role	Won	
Stinkers Bad Movie Awards	2006	These Boots Are Made For Walkin'	Worst Song or Song Performance in a Film or Its End Credits	Won	
Teen Choice Awards	2000	Herself	Choice Breakout Artist	Won	
Teen Choice Awards	2000	Where You Are	Choice Love Song	Won	
Teen Choice Awards	2000	I Wanna Love You Forever	Choice Love Song	Nominated	
Teen Choice Awards	2000	Herself	Choice Female Artist	Nominated	
Teen Choice Awards	2000	Herself	Choice Female Hottie	Nominated	
Teen Choice Awards	2001	Irresistible	Choice Love Song	Nominated	
Teen Choice Awards	2001	Irresistible	Choice Song of the Summer	Nominated	
Teen Choice Awards	2001	Herself	Choice Female Artist	Nominated	
Teen Choice Awards	2004	Herself	Choice TV Personality	Nominated	
Teen Choice Awards	2004	Newlyweds: Nick and Jessica	Choice Reality/Variety TV Star – Female	Won	
Teen Choice Awards	2004	Herself	Choice Music: Female Artist	Nominated	
Teen Choice Awards	2004	In This Skin	Choice Music: Album	Nominated	
Teen Choice Awards	2004	Take My Breath Away	Choice Music: Love Song	Nominated	
Teen Choice Awards	2004	Reality Tour	Choice Music: Tour of the Year	Nominated	
Teen Choice Awards	2005	Herself	Choice TV Personality: Female	Won	
Teen Choice Awards	2005	Herself	Choice Hottie: Female	Nominated	
Teen Choice Awards	2005	Herself	Choice Red Carpet Fashion Icon: Female	Won	
Teen Choice Awards	2005	These Boots Are Made For Walkin'	Choice Summer Song	Nominated	
Teen Choice Awards	2006	Dukes of Hazzard	Choice Movie Breakout Star – Female	Won	
Teen Choice Awards	2006	Herself	Choice Female Hottie	Nominated	
Teen Choice Awards	2006	Herself	Choice Red Carpet Female Fashion Icon	Nominated	
Teen Choice Awards	2007	Employee of the Month	Choice Movie Actress: Comedy	Nominated	
Teen Choice Awards	2010	The Price of Beauty	Choice TV: Reality Show	Nominated	
Teen Choice Awards	2010	Herself	Choice Activist	Nominated	
Teen Choice Awards	2012	Herself	Choice TV: Female Personality	Nominated	
Us Weekly Style Awards	2005	Herself	Style Icon of the Year	Won	
VH1 Big in Awards	2003	Chicken or Fish?	The BIG Quote of '03	Nominated	
VH1 Big in Awards	2005	Herself	BIG Stylin'	Won	
Virgin Media Music Awards	2006	Herself	Best International Female Artist	Nominated	
World Music Awards	2005	Herself	World's Best Selling Pop Female Artist	Nominated	
