= Stacy Clark =

American singer-songwriter

- Born: September 21, 1980 (age 46); Buffalo, New York, United States
- Origin: Los Angeles, California
- Genres: Pop, folk, acoustic
- Occupations: Musician, singer, songwriter
- Instruments: Guitar, singing, piano, bass guitar
- Years active: 1995–
- Labels: One Small Instrument, Vanguard, Shangri-La
- Website: stacyclark.net

Stacy Clark (born September 21, 1980) is an American singer-songwriter born in Buffalo, New York.

== Beginnings ==
Clark was born and raised in Buffalo, New York. Self-taught, Clark stood out in the Buffalo music scene and was often compared to the next Ani DiFranco.

In 2004, Clark packed her bags and made the long drive from NYC to California to further pursue a career in music. Clark landed a production deal off of her songwriting, and went into the studio with producer Ian Kirkpatrick to record EP Unusual.

In 2007, Clark went back into the studio with Kirkpatrick to create her album Apples & Oranges. Without the help of a record label, she worked full-time to fund the album. The album was released November 20 and many of the songs off the album where featured on television including MTV and CBS. The album features guest vocals from: Tom Higgenson, Tim Pagnotta and Aaron Marsh. During the summer Clark appeared as a guest VJ for MTV on its Portland, Oregon segment of The Big Ten. Aside from constant touring, Clark also sang back up vocals with Copeland at their Henry Fonda Theater Rentals support show.

In 2008, Clark's songs "Say What You Want", "Closer", "Empty Bottles" were played on MTV's hit series "The Hills" and "Matter of Time" was played on ABC's hit TV show Make It Or Break It. She sang on Jack's Mannequin's album "The Glass Passenger" on the tracks "Crashin'" and "Spinning". All of her hard work helped her land on the 'Top 10' list for 944 Magazine 'Who's Who in Orange County'. Clarks music is played in Victoria's Secret, DKNY, Forever 21, Calvin Klein, Sephora, BCBG, Nordstrom stores among hotels, movie theaters and restaurants. In September, Clark signed a record deal with Jeff Ayeroff to Shangri-La Music (The Pretenders, Monsters of Folk, Band of Skulls, The Duke Spirit). She worked closely with A&R David Field (Björk, Radiohead, Band of Skulls) and recorded her album Connect the Dots with producer Matt Appleton (Panic! at the Disco, The Veronica's, The Used, Foxy Shazam) in Venice Beach, CA. Clark got released from Shangrila. Her song "Touch & Go" was selected for the Canadian National Sprint Bell Palm Pre Commercial. Other songs off the album have received placement including her song "All Time Low" on CW's One Tree Hill.

In March 2010, Clark signed a deal with Vanguard Records her album "Connect the Dots" was released on August 10, 2010. She released three music videos to support her LP release. Her music video "Touch & Go", directed by 8112 Studios, was premiered exclusively through Absolute Punk ". Her music video for "Hold On", directed by Jay Torres (known for his work on Aerosmith, Madonna music videos) was released exclusively in September on Teen Vogue and the non-profit To Write Love On Her Arms. Clark shot her music video "Not Enough" in Santa Ana, California directed by Steve Gunzman. In July 2010, Clark opened for the rock band America in front of 15,000 people at Artpark, Western New York's premiere destination for music. Clark landed the iTunes "Single of the Week" for her song "White Lies" getting 420,000 downloads landing her a spot at no. 7 ahead of Lady Gaga for top record sales in a day. This help Clark garnish airplay on Top 40 stations around the world helping her to make the September 2010 Billboard Heat Seekers Chart.

In 2011, her album "Connect the Dots" landed at no. 70 on Amazon "Best Albums of 2011" Clark was also nominated for five Orange County Music Awards (Best Pop, Best Live Acoustic Performer, Best Video, Best Song "Touch & Go" and Best Record). Winning 'Best Pop Artist'. Clark went LA Ink to get her 'Connect the Dots' artwork tattooed by Dan Smith to document her musical journey. Her song "I Do" was used in the Season Finale of Keeping Up with the Kardashians when Kris Humphries proposed to Kim Kardashian.

On November 22, Clark independently released 'Patterns' on her label One Small Instrument Records. Buffalo News reviewed it as having "Dreamy pop with folk roots. Clark is the genuine article, a deeply talented songwriter and record maker with a gorgeous voice. 'Patterns' is beautifully produced, and is crammed full of deft, subtle harmonic and sonic touches. Smart, sexy, and sometimes, simply sublime." ITunes reviewed it as "overflowing with all kinds of charm. The opener, "Lose My Mind," sets the tone with a perfect blend of indie and pop, as retro-sounding synthesizers work their way around percolating beats while Clark's cooing vocals melt over a catchy chorus. The following "Days into Nights" is less busy; it gives Clark plenty of room to stretch her vocal range, especially in the wide-open refrain where her notes soar outward. Old-school drum and bass textures pepper the comforting "Sign," where her breathy inflections wash over the listener. The innovatively arranged "Decimals and Music Notes" moves with unpredictable changes that rub against the grain of her smooth and simple vocal style. It's refreshing to hear a songstress confidently come into her own style, most noticeably in "Breathe," where the sole accompaniment of an acoustic guitar really lets you home in on her lovely voice.".

In 2012, Clark took home the 'Best Singer-Songwriter Award' for Artists in Music held in Los Angeles at the Key Club. Artists in Music Awards – All indie music. In July, she opened for Eddie Money at the Molson Lockport Canal Series in Lockport, NY and August for Roger Hodgson of Supertramp at Artpark. She was featured artist on MTV and her music video 'Sign' spun on MTV Hits. Clark performed live in NYC which was recorded and played on XM Sirius The Loft. In October, Clark performed at the Balboa Beach Music Fest in Newport Beach along with Matt Nathanson, Josh Radin, and A Fine Frenzy followed by a national acoustic tour. In November, Clark sang back up vocals with Jack's Mannequin at their last two sold-out concerts at the El Rey Theatre in Los Angeles.

Over the past few years, Clark has also donated time, music, design and raised money for various charities including TWLOHA, Habitat For Humanity, Children's Hospital of Orange County, PETA, and the ASPCA (in the process becoming the owner of a rescue dog), and has performed at variety of benefit concerts for The American Red Cross, Orangewood Children's Foundation, Inside the Outdoors, The American Cancer Society, The National Multiple Sclerosis Society and The Cystic Fibrosis Walk, to name a few.

Her music has been featured on CW, ABC, CBS, E!, Comedy Central, Bravo, MTV, VH1, Showtime, Oxygen, ABC Family and Netflix. She has been touring nonstop the past several years. Including playing residencies in Singapore, at the Cosmopolitan in Las Vegas, the Detroit Bar in Orange County and in Hollywood at the Hard Rock Cafe. She has performed with artists such as: Jack's Mannequin, America, Eddie Money, Roger Hodgson of Supertramp, Switchfoot, Plain White T's, Scars on 45, Phantom Planet, Paper Route, The Bird and the Bee, Tumbledown, Kate Nash, Belinda Carlisle of The Go Go's, Mansions on the Moon, Copeland, The New Amsterdams, Josh Radin and Dick Dale. Clark lists John Lennon, Paul McCartney, Stevie Nicks, Otis Redding and Etta James as some of her influences.

== Discography ==
=== Albums ===
- 2007: Apples & Oranges
- 2010: Connect the Dots No. 12 Billboard Top Heatseekers, Amazon 'Best Records of 2011 List'
- 2011: Patterns
- 2014: Symmetry, Pandora Premieres, No. 25 Speciality Radio 'Make A Move' (8/13/14)

=== Co-Writes ===
- Andrew McMahon in the Wilderness: Lottery Ticket

=== Singles ===
- Unusual (2007)
- Say What You Want (2007, One Small Instrument)
- White Lies (2010, Vanguard Records)
- Sign (2011, One Small Instrument)
- Figured It Out (2014, One Small Instrument)
- We Are The Fortunate Ones (2015, One Small Instrument)
- Mixed Signals (2015, One Small Instrument)
- Maybe (2019, One Small Instrument)
- Magic Pill (2021, One Small Instrument)

=== EPs ===
- 2002: Movement
- 2006: Unusual
- 2010: Connect The Dots EP
- 2013: Days into Nights EP

=== Compilation appearances ===
- 2007 – Airport Tapes and Records Compilation, a label owned by Andrew McMahon

=== Guest appearances ===
- 2008: Jack's Mannequin – The Glass Passenger (Sire) (songs: "Crashin'", "Spinning")
- 2008: Mikoto – We Are the Architects (Torque Records) (song: "Giving Up")
- 2009: Ivan Ives – Newspeak No Threshold Records (song: "I Can't Wait)
- 2010: The Seams – Spanish American (song: "Real Love')
- 2010: Delux – Album "Get The Money" (SONY) (Hey Lover)
- 2010: Act As If – There's A Light (song: "Through Trap Doors')
- 2012: Delux – Hey Lover (Music Video)

=== Remixes ===
- 2014: "Days Into Nights" – KREAX remix
- 2011: "Anywhere" – remixed by Kevin Alves
- 2008: "Stuck on You" – featuring Stacy Clark remixed by The Company We Keep.The Nurse Who Loved Me – A Tribute to Failure

== Awards ==
=== Awarded ===
- 2006: Southern California Music Awards – Best Female Performer
- 2006: Inland Empire Music Awards – Best Out of County Artist
- 2007: Inland Empire Music Awards – Best Out of County Artist
- 2007: Orange County Music Awards – Best Female Performer
- 2010: Orange County Music Awards – Best Pop
- 2011: Orange County Music Awards – Best Pop
- 2012: Artists in Music Awards – Best Singer-Songwriter

=== Nominated ===
- 2007: Toronto Independent International Music Awards – Best International Artist
- 2009: Orange County Music Awards – Best Pop Artist
- 2010: Orange County Music Awards – Best Pop Artist
- 2010: Orange County Music Awards – Best Live Acoustic Performer
- 2011: Orange County Music Awards – Best Pop Artist
- 2011: Orange County Music Awards – Best Song: "Touch & Go"
- 2011: Orange County Music Awards – Best Live Acoustic Performer
- 2011: Orange County Music Awards – Best Music Video "Not Enough"
- 2011: Orange County Music Awards – Best Album "Connect the Dots"
- 2012: Artists In Music Awards – Best Singer/Songwriter
- 2012: Artists In Music Awards – Artist of the Year
- 2012: Orange County Music Awards – Best Pop Artist
- 2013: Orange County Music Awards – Best Pop Artist
- 2014: Orange County Music Awards – Best Pop Artist

== Music videos ==
- "Figured It Out" on MTV (2014)
- "Next Town" on MTV (2014)
- "Make A Move" on MTV (2013)
- "Sign" on MTV (2012)
- "Not Enough"
- "Touch & Go"
- "Hold On"
- "Matter of Time"

== Television ==
=== TV appearances ===
- Pivot – Guest vocalist on Hit Record on TV: The Dark (Season 2, Episode 1)
- MTV Hits – Guest VJ on Portland, OR Segment The Top 10. Summer 2008.
- LA Ink – August 8, 2011
- KATU – March 1, 2011. Live performance of 'White Lies'
- AM Buffalo – June 28, 2010. Live performance and interview.
- PBS – January 8, 2011. Live performance of 'Not Enough'
- KOCE – March 4, 2009
- NBC – "Hard Rock Cafe Presents" January 8, 2011
- NBC – March 15, 2011
- Channel One – October 3, 2010

=== TV song appearances ===
- Budweiser – 2019 United States National Commercial, featured vocals (song: "Just Begun")
- Broad City – Season 2, Episode: 1: In Heat (song: "Lose My Mind") on Comedy Central
- Younger – Season 1, Episode: 12: The Old Ma'am and the C (song: "Waited For You") on TV Land
- Girlfriends' Guide to Divorce – Season 1, Episode: 1: Rule No. 23: Never Lie To The Kids (song: "Figured It Out") on Bravo
- Girlfriends' Guide to Divorce – Season 1 Finale (song: "Lose My Mind") on Bravo
- Awkward – Season 4, Episode 15 (song: "Everything's Changing feat. Andrew McMahon") on MTV
- Blue Bloods – Season 4, Episode: 17: Knock Out Game (song: "Sign") on CBS
- Vanderpump Rules – Season 2, Episode: 22: Til Death Do Us Part (song: "Make A Move") on BRAVO
- Keeping Up with the Kardashians – Season 6, Episode 13: 'The Proposal' (song: I Do) on E!
- One Tree Hill – Season 7, Episode 706: 'Deep Ocean, Vast Sea' (song:"All Time Low") CW
- The Early Show – Episode: 110825 (song: "Touch & Go") on CBS
- Palm Pre – 2009 National Canadian Commercial (song: "Touch & Go")
- The Real World – San Diego/Episode 2601:(song: "Don't Try To Take Whats Mine") on MTV
- Bad Girls Club – Season 8, Episode 9: (song: "All Time Low") on Oxygen
- Bad Girls Club – Season 8, Episode 5: (song: "Hide") on Oxygen
- The Real L Word – Season 2, Episode 1: 'A Fresh Start'(song: "Closer") on Showtime
- The Real L Word – Season 2, Episode 2: 'The Morning After'(song: "Hello Again") on Showtime
- The Real L Word – Season 2, Episode 6:'Baby Batter Up'(song: "Hold On") on Showtime
- The Real L Word – Season 2, Episode 7: 'The Morning After' (song: "You Make It Worse") on Showtime
- The Real L Word – Season 2, Episode 9:'The Pieces Fall into Place'(song: "White Lies") on Showtime
- The Real L Word – Season 2, Episode 9 (song: "You Make It Worse") on Showtime
- The Price of Beauty – Season 1, Episode 101: 'Thailand'(song: "Matter of Time") Jessica Simpson's show on VH1
- The Price of Beauty – Season 1, Episode 103: 'India' (song: "Strange") Jessica Simpson's show on VH1
- The Price of Beauty – Season 1, Episode 104: 'Uganda' (song: "Strange") Jessica Simpson's show on VH1
- The Price of Beauty – Season 1, Episode 105: 'Morocco' (song: "Wont Let You") Jessica Simpson's show on VH1
- Samurai Girl – Episode 2: Book of Heart (song:"Hello Again") on ABC Family
- Samurai Girl – Episode 2: Book of Heart (song: "Wont Let You") on ABC Family
- The Rachel Zoe Project – Season 1, Episode 2 (song: "Empty Bottles") "Awards Season that's Bananas!" on BRAVO
- Make It Or Break It – Season 2, Episode 15: 'He Loves Me, He Loves Me Not'(song: "Matter of Time") on ABC Family
- Make It Or Break It – Season 2, Episode 12: 'Free People'(song: "Hello Again") on ABC Family
- The Buried Life – Season 1, Episode: 103 'Ask Out The Girl Of Your Dreams'(song: "Empty Bottles") on MTV
- The Buried Life – Season 1, Episode 104: 'Help Deliver A Baby"(song: "Strange") on MTV
- The Buried Life – Season 1, Episode 106: 'Play Basketball with Obama'(song: "Matter of Time") on MTV
- Fly Girls – Season 1, Episode 106: High Expectations (song: "Hello Again") on CW
- Fly Girls – Season 1, Episode 107: Last Call (song: "Hello Again") on CW
- Fly Girls – Season 1, Episode 107: Last Call (song: "Strange") on CW
- Fly Girls – Season 1, Episode 108: Last Call (song: "Wont Let You") on CW
- Fly Girls – Season 1, Episode 108: Last Call (song: "Recluse") on CW
- Fly Girls – Season 1, Episode 108: Last Call (song: "Say What You Want") on CW
- Teen Mom – Season 2, Episode 107 (song:"Misery") on MTV
- Girlfriends – Season 8, Episode 3: "Where Did Lynn-Digo?" (song: "Unusual") on CBS
- Girlfriends – Season 8, Episode 12: "What's Black A Lackin" (song: "Unusual") on CBS
- The Hills – Season 3, Episode 320 (song: "Say What You Want") on MTV
- The Hills – Season 3, Episode 325 (song:"Empty Bottles") on MTV
- The Hills – Season 3, Episode 326 (song: "Closer") on MTV
- Engaged & Underage – Season 2, Episode 5: 'Jewel & Cory' (song:"You Make It Worse")on MTV
- If You Really Knew Me – Season 1, Episode 8 (song: "Hold On") on MTV
- Exiled – Season 1, Episode 9: 'Erin in Mongolia' (song: "Empty Bottles") on MTV
- True Life – Season 1, Episode 13 'I'm Stuck at Home' (song: "Say What You Want") on MTV
- True Life – Episode: Heroin, 'I Am Addicted to Heroin' (song: "Closer") on MTV
- It Gets Better – Episode: November 10, 2012 (song: "Closer") on MTV
- Guidance - (song: "All Time Low") on Verizon
- Guidance - (song: "Wander") on Verizon

== Feature film song appearances ==
- The Wedding Year (2019) – (song: "Maybe")
- Other People's Children (2014) – (song: "Make A Move")
- Son Of Mourning (2011) – (song: "Empty Bottles")
