= Sweet Kisses =

Studio album by Jessica Simpson
- Released: November 23, 1999
- Recorded: 1998–1999
- Studios: Homesite 13 (Novato, CA); Lobo Recording Studios (Long Island, NY); The Hit Factory (New York, NY); Studio 56 (Los Angeles, CA); Quad Studios (New York, NY); The Bike Shop (New York, NY); Sony Music Studios (New York, NY); Blue Wave Studio (Vancouver, BC); One on One South (Los Angeles, CA); The Loft Recording Studios (Bronxville, NY); Backroom Studios (California); Final Approach (Encino, CA); Parsons Green (Culver City, CA); 57 Varieties Music (Sherman Oaks, CA)
- Genres: Teen pop; dance-pop; R&B
- Length: 44:28
- Label: Columbia
- Producers: Louis Biancaniello; Robbie Nevil; Evan Rogers; Cory Rooney; Dan Shea; Carl Sturken; Sam Watters; Dave Deviller; Andy Goldmark; Jamie Houston; London Jones; Eric Foster White; Sean Hosein

Jessica Simpson chronology
| Sweet Kisses (1999) | Irresistible (2001) |

Singles from Sweet Kisses
- 1. "I Wanna Love You Forever" Released: August 30, 1999; 2. "Where You Are" Released: February 21, 2000; 3. "I Think I'm in Love with You" Released: February 23, 2000

Sweet Kisses is the debut studio album by American singer Jessica Simpson, released in the United States on November 23, 1999, by Columbia Records. Its lyrical and visual representations carry the common theme of virginal innocence, a continuation of 1999's teen-pop revival. It was produced to capitalize on the success of teen artists Britney Spears and Christina Aguilera, who both debuted earlier that year. Sweet Kisses peaked at number 25 on the Billboard 200 albums chart, and was certified 2× Platinum by the Recording Industry Association of America (RIAA) for shipments of over two million copies. As of February 2009, it has sold 1.9 million copies in the US, and over 4 million worldwide.

Sweet Kisses spawned three singles, including Simpson's debut single: "I Wanna Love You Forever", which is her biggest hit in the US. The second single was a duet: "Where You Are" with future husband Nick Lachey of 98 Degrees. The third single was a dance track: "I Think I'm in Love with You", which samples "Jack & Diane" by John Cougar Mellencamp.

== Background ==
Simpson first developed and nurtured her talent in her local Baptist church, where her father also worked as the congregation's youth minister. At age twelve, she unsuccessfully auditioned for The Mickey Mouse Club. While attending a church camp, at the age of 13, Simpson sang Whitney Houston's "I Will Always Love You" and an arrangement of "Amazing Grace". One of the camp's visitors was launching a Gospel music record label and saw great promise and profits in her voice. It was during this time, while attending J. J. Pearce High School, Simpson signed to Proclaim Records, a minor Gospel music record label. She recorded an album, Jessica, but Proclaim went bankrupt and the album was never officially released except for a small pressing funded by her grandmother. This small pressing gained her minor attention which led her to performing at concerts with other gospel legendary acts such as Kirk Franklin, God's Property, and CeCe Winans. When she was seventeen years old, Columbia Records executive Tommy Mottola heard Jessica, he was impressed with Simpson's musical talent and skill. Mottola instantly thought Simpson sounded like Mariah Carey. Simpson was immediately signed to the label. She dropped out of high school but later earned her GED.

Simpson also collaborated with Sam Watters for the album. Watters produced the singles "I Wanna Love You Forever" and "Where You Are", as well as "Heart of Innocence". Watters also co-wrote the track "I Wanna Love You Forever", along with Louis Biancaniello. Carl Sturken and Evan Rogers also produced the tracks "I've Got My Eyes On You" and "Betcha She Don't Love You" together.

== Release and promotion ==
Sweet Kisses was released on 23 November 1999 through Columbia Records in United States, Canada, Australia and Europe. Following year, it was released in Japan, on 19 January 2000 through Sony Music Entertainment. The album was released in the United Kingdom on 24 April 2000.

=== Singles ===
"I Wanna Love You Forever" was the first single released from the album in September 1999. The song became Simpson's highest-charting single in the United States, peaking at number three on the Billboard Hot 100. Its commercial sales were particularly strong, landing atop the Hot 100 Singles Sales for six weeks; the song later received a platinum certification. It was also a top ten hit in Canada. Worldwide, the single was also successful. It peaked within the top ten across Europe, including Norway, Sweden, United Kingdom, Switzerland and Belgium, as well as Australia.

"Where You Are" was released as the second single from the album. The single failed to reach even the top fifty of the Billboard Hot 100, peaking at sixty-two. The song did, however, become a relative Adult Contemporary hit. The song became a hit on the Hot Dance Music/Maxi-Singles Sales reaching number four. Internationally, the song was not released in major music markets excluding Canada.

"I Think I'm In Love with You" was the third and final single released from the album and became a moderate hit, reaching number twenty-one on the US Billboard Hot 100 largely on the strength of its radio airplay; it reached the top five on Billboard's Top 40 Mainstream and achieved success on the Adult Contemporary and Rhythmic Top 40 charts. Worldwide, it was a moderate hit, peaking at number ten on Australian ARIA Singles Chart, and reached the top twenty in Canada, United Kingdom and New Zealand.

== Critical reception ==
Professional ratings
Review scores
| Source | Rating |
|---|---|
| Allmusic | 3/5 stars |
| Entertainment Weekly | C− |
| MTV Asia | 5/10 |
| The Rolling Stone Album Guide | 1.5/5 stars |
| The Village Voice | D |

The album received mostly mixed reviews. Allmusic gave the album three out of five stars, quoting, "She delves into the frothy dance-pop that's teen pop's stock-in-trade, but the heart of her album lies in adult contemporary ballads like her breakout hit "I Wanna Love You Forever," which gives her a chance to show off the richness of her voice. She doesn't over-sing, like Aguilera occasionally does, even if she has moments where she pushes the envelope slightly — just like her idol Dion. However, there are already indications that she's developing her own voice, since she is equally capable of delivering danceable urban R&B ("Final Heartbreak," "I've Got My Eyes on You," the Destiny's Child duet "Woman in Me") as she is mature balladry ("Faith in Me," the Nick Lachey duet "Where You Are"). Like most teen-pop albums, Sweet Kisses suffers from inconsistent material, yet the filler is well-produced and performed, making the record every bit as listenable as Aguilera's fine debut." People Magazine was less critical of the album, quoting "Blonde, pouty-lipped and impossibly cute, Jessica Simpson is as tough to pick out of a lineup of lookalike teenage songbirds as her breathless hit "I Wanna Love You Forever" is difficult to differentiate from the rest of Top 40 radio. So far, Simpson's debut album hasn't scored the same success as those of Britney Spears and Christina Aguilera. But rest assured there are more cookies like "I Wanna" in Simpson's cutter. One ditty, titled "Where Are You," is a duet with 98° boy-toy Nick Lachey, Simpson's real-life squeeze. Unlike her peers the 19-year-old Simpson is not a former member of Disney's Mickey Mouse Club. She auditioned for the show at age 12 but didn't make the cut. Also setting her apart from the teen pop pack is Simpson's track record as a performer on the Christian music circuit. Here, she sounds downright worldly singing "Heart of Innocence"—a devotional tune she wrote extolling the virtues of premarital abstinence—in a low, sexy croon. Bottom Line: Teen yearnings set to a watery R&B beat." Sal Cinquemani of Slant Magazine praised Sweet Kisses as a hopeful debut when comparing her next album negatively to it.

Entertainment Weekly gave the album a C−, stating "Jessica Simpson, a melodramatic 19, chirps cheeky Mariah Carey-isms on Sweet Kisses, a subpar portfolio, missing the soulful target almost every time. 'Do you wanna see the woman in me?/Let me show you,' she lasciviously hisses in one laughable instance, backed by a doo-wopping Destiny's Child. Uh, thanks, but no, kid. Been there, done that. Mom's waiting for you outside in the station wagon." Robert Christgau wrote in The Village Voice: "Simpson is a blonde who got out of cheerleading early to prepare herself for whatever show business offered--game-show sidekick, R-rated remake of Debbie Does Dallas, bond trader seeking trophy wife. What she got was a John Cougar Mellencamp sample and the hard-earned ability to carry a tune. We know teenpop is rarely as vapid, prefab, and faux-wholesome as gatekeepers who've barely listened to it claim. So let's not tell them about this 'refreshing blend of pop, R&B and [note copywriter getting desperate] gospel-flavored sounds.'"

== Commercial performance ==
Initially, Sweet Kisses debuted at number sixty-five on the US Billboard 200, selling 65,000 copies in its first week, significantly lower than expected by Columbia Records, as the first single from the album was a hit, peaking at #3 on the Billboard Hot 100. The following week, the album had dropped to number seventy, and continuing down the following weeks. To boost record sales, the label released the second single "Where You Are", but could not reach the success of its predecessor "I Wanna Love You Forever". While Sweet Kisses was kept in the top sixty for several weeks, the label decided to make one last attempt to launch the third single from the album. "I Think I'm in Love with You" was released in May 2000, instantly became a hit on radio stations that helped to rise from posts and the album reached the peak of twenty-five in August 2000. In total, the album stayed on the chart for sixty-two weeks. The album was certified 2× Platinum by the RIAA. As of February 2009, the album has sold 1.9 million copies in the United States. In territories outside of the United States, the album had a similar chart effect. In Canada, Sweet Kisses peaked at number thirty-four on the Canadian Albums Chart. The album stayed on the chart for 37 weeks. Later it was certified Platinum by the Canadian Recording Industry Association (CRIA; now Music Canada).

In Europe, the album performed better on the charts, peaking at number four in Norway and was certified Gold for sales 15,000 copies in that territory. and number five in Switzerland and remains Simpson's only top five album in that territory. It also peaked at number fifty-five in Sweden. In Japan, the album debuted at number sixteen on the Oricon albums chart, making it her only album to date to chart within the top twenty in Japan and according to Oricon, has sold 118,350 copies in Japan. In the United Kingdom, where the singles were met with a great commercial performance, the album debuted at number thirty-six. This makes Sweet Kisses Simpson's highest-charting album in the United Kingdom, tied with her third studio album In This Skin (2003). In Australia, the album debuted at number fifty-two, surprising the label as the album had spawned two top ten hits in the country. In June 2001, Sony Music reported that Sweet Kisses had sold three million copies worldwide, presenting Simpson with a commemorative plaque during a party celebrating the release of her second album, Irresistible. As the date, Sweet Kisses has sold four million copies worldwide.

== Track listing ==
Sweet Kisses — Standard edition
| No. | Title | Writer(s) | Producer(s) | Length |
|---|---|---|---|---|
| 1. | "I Wanna Love You Forever" | Sam Watters; Louis Biancaniello | Watters; Biancaniello | 4:24 |
| 2. | "I Think I'm in Love with You" | Cory Rooney; Dan Shea; John Mellencamp | Rooney; Shea | 3:18 |
| 3. | "Where You Are" (featuring Nick Lachey) | Watters; Biancaniello; Adamantia Stamatopoulou; Lachey | Biancaniello; Watters | 4:32 |
| 4. | "Final Heartbreak" | Eric Foster White | White | 3:40 |
| 5. | "Woman in Me" (featuring Destiny's Child) | Meja Beckman; Anders Bagge | Robbie Nevil | 3:51 |
| 6. | "I've Got My Eyes on You" | Paul Rein; Johan Åberg | Carl Sturken; Evan Rogers | 3:34 |
| 7. | "Betcha She Don't Love You" | Sturken; Rogers | Sturken; Rogers | 4:13 |
| 8. | "My Wonderful" | London Jones; Dwight Sills | Jones | 4:13 |
| 9. | "Sweet Kisses" | Andy Goldmark; Jamie Houston; J. D. Hicks | Goldmark; Houston | 3:23 |
| 10. | "Your Faith in Me" | Dane DeViller; Sean Hosein; Ty Lacy | DeViller; Hosein | 4:24 |
| 11. | "Heart of Innocence" | Simpson; Gary Baker; Frank Joseph Meyers; Paula Carpenter | Biancaniello; Watters | 4:55 |

Sweet Kisses — Australian and Asian edition (bonus track)
| No. | Title | Writer(s) | Producer(s) | Length |
|---|---|---|---|---|
| 12. | "Did You Ever Love Somebody" | Marsha Malamet; Liz Vidal | Sturken; Rogers | 3:54 |

Sweet Kisses — European edition (bonus track)
| No. | Title | Writer(s) | Producer(s) | Length |
|---|---|---|---|---|
| 12. | "You Don't Know What Love Is" | Sturken; Rogers | Sturken; Rogers | 4:21 |

Sample credits

- "I Think I'm in Love with You" contains a sample of "Jack & Diane", written and performed by John Cougar Mellencamp.
- "Woman in Me" is a cover of Legacy of Sound.

== Personnel ==
- Jessica Simpson - Lead vocals, background vocals
- Anas Allaf - guitar
- Louis Biancaniello - keyboard
- Chris Camozzi - guitar
- Graeme Coleman - piano, conductor
- Destiny's Child - background vocals
- Dave Deviller - acoustic guitar
- Sherree Ford-Payne - background vocals
- Andy Goldmark - keyboard
- Tania Hancheroff - background vocals
- Tim Hientz - keyboard
- Simon Isherwood - conductor
- London Jones - keyboard, background vocals
- Nick Lachey - vocals
- Gordon Maxwell - background vocals
- Robbie Nevil - guitar
- Notre Dame Gospel Choir
- Dan Petty - acoustic guitar, electric guitar
- Evan Rogers - background vocals
- Jill Seifers - background vocals
- Dwight Sills - guitar
- Beverley Staunton - background vocals
- Carl Sturken - multiple instruments
- Michael Thompson - guitar
- Sam Watters - background vocals
- Eric Foster White - keyboard

=== Production ===
- Producers: Louis Biancaniello, Dave Deviller, Andy Goldmark, Dan Shea, Jamie Houston, London Jones, Robbie Nevil, Evan Rogers, Corey Rooney, Carl Sturken, Sam Watters, Eric Foster White
- Engineers: Steve George, Andy Goldmark, Scott Gutierrez, Al Hemberger, Ben Holt, Martin Horenburg, Hank Linderman, Glen Marchese, Tim "Flash" Mariner, Michael "Wolf" Reaves, Steve Smith, Paul Wagner, Eric Foster White, Rob Williams
- Assistant engineers: Jeff Gregory, Matt Martiensson, Ronnie Rivera, Jose Sanchez, Manelich Sotolong
- Mixing: Mick Guzauski, Tony Maserati
- Mixing assistants: Tom Bender, Jeff Gregory, Ben Holt, Ethan Schofer
- Editing: Jack Kugell
- Production coordination: Kim Gorham, Collen Reynolds
- Production coordination assistant: Andrea Derby
- Programming: Louis Biancaniello, Dan Shea, Dave Deviller, London Jones, Eric Foster White
- Drum programming: Iki Levy
- Arranger: Dave Deviller
- String arrangements: Graeme Coleman
- Art direction: Ron Jaramillo
- Design: Ron Jaramillo
- Photography: Alberto Tolot
- Stylist: Rachel Zoe
- Hair stylist: Ken Paves
- Make-up: Francesca Tolot

== Charts ==
=== Weekly charts ===
Weekly chart performance for Sweet Kisses
| Chart (1999–2000) | Peak position |
|---|---|
| Australian Albums (ARIA) | 52 |
| Austrian Albums (Ö3 Austria) | 43 |
| Belgian Albums (Ultratop Flanders) | 45 |
| Canada Top Albums/CDs (RPM) | 34 |
| Dutch Albums (Album Top 100) | 55 |
| European Top 100 Albums (Music & Media) | 49 |
| Finnish Albums (Suomen virallinen lista) | 40 |
| German Albums (Offizielle Top 100) | 44 |
| Japanese Albums (Oricon) | 16 |
| Norwegian Albums (VG-lista) | 4 |
| Scottish Albums (Official Charts) | 51 |
| Swedish Albums (Sverigetopplistan) | 55 |
| Swiss Albums (Schweizer Hitparade) | 5 |
| UK Albums (Official Charts) | 36 |
| US Billboard 200 | 25 |

=== Year-end charts ===
Year-end chart performance for Sweet Kisses
| Chart (2000) | Position |
|---|---|
| Canadian Albums (Nielsen SoundScan) | 102 |
| Norwegian Spring Period Albums (VG-lista) | 14 |
| US Billboard 200 | 51 |

== Certifications and sales ==
| Region | Certification | Certified units/sales |
|---|---|---|
| Canada (Music Canada) | Platinum | 100,000^{^} |
| Japan (RIAJ) | Gold | 118,350 |
| Norway (IFPI Norway) | Gold | 25,000^{*} |
| Singapore | — | 5,000 |
| United States (RIAA) | 2× Platinum | 2,000,000^{^} |
Summaries
| Worldwide | — | 4,000,000 |
^{*} Sales figures based on certification alone.^{^} Shipments figures based on certification alone.

== Release history ==
| Region | Date | Format | Label | Catalog | Ref. |
|---|---|---|---|---|---|
| Australia | November 23, 1999 | CD, cassette | Sony Music | 4953642 | |
| Canada | November 23, 1999 | CD, cassette | Sony Music | CK 69096 | |
| Europe | November 23, 1999 | CD, cassette | Sony Music | 4949332 | |
| United States | November 23, 1999 | CD, cassette | Columbia | CK 69096 | |
| Japan | January 19, 2000 | CD, cassette | Sony Music | SRCS 2126 | |
