= Where You Are (Jessica Simpson song) =

2000 single by Jessica Simpson

Single by Jessica Simpson featuring Nick Lachey

from the album Sweet Kisses
- Released: February 21, 2000
- Studio: Homesite 13 (Novato, CA); Studio 56 (Los Angeles, CA); Quad Studios (New York, NY); The Hit Factory (New York, NY)
- Genre: Pop
- Length: 4:27 (album version); 3:54 (edit)
- Label: Columbia
- Songwriters: Louis Biancaniello; Sam Watters; A. Stamatopoulou; Nick Lachey
- Producers: Louis Biancaniello; Sam Watters

Jessica Simpson singles chronology
"I Wanna Love You Forever" (1999)	"Where You Are" (2000)	"I Think I'm in Love with You" (2000)

Nick Lachey singles chronology
"Where You Are" (2000)	"Shut Up" (2003)

Music video
- "Where You Are" on Youtube.com

"Where You Are" is a song by American recording artist Jessica Simpson from her debut studio album Sweet Kisses. The single was released after strong commercial interest in her first single "I Wanna Love You Forever". Written by Louis Biancaniello, Sam Watters, A. Stamatopoulou, Nick Lachey and produced by Louis Biancaniello, Sam Watters, the song (which is a collaboration with Nick Lachey) was released as Simpson's second single and as the lead single in the Here on Earth soundtrack on February 21, 2000, by Columbia. The song reached number 62 on the US Billboard, becoming Simpson's second Hot 100 chart entry. The single is most known for being the first single that Simpson professionally recorded with Lachey. (The couple recorded several other duets, including, "A Whole New World" and "Baby, It's Cold Outside".)

== Background ==
Simpson developed and nurtured her talent in her local Baptist church, where her father worked as the congregation's youth minister. At age twelve, she unsuccessfully auditioned for The Mickey Mouse Club. While attending a church camp, at the age of 13, Simpson sang Whitney Houston's "I Will Always Love You" and an arrangement of "Amazing Grace". One of the camp's visitors was launching a Gospel music record label and saw great promise and profits in her voice. While attending J. J. Pearce High School, Simpson signed to Proclaim Records, a minor Gospel music record label. She recorded an album, Jessica, but Proclaim went bankrupt and the album was never released except for a small pressing funded by her grandmother. This small pressing gained her minor attention which led her to performing at concerts with other gospel legendary acts such as Kirk Franklin, God's Property, and CeCe Winans. When she was sixteen years old, Columbia Records executive Tommy Mottola heard Jessica, he was impressed with Simpson's musical talent and skill. Mottola instantly thought Simpson sounded like Mariah Carey. Simpson was immediately signed to the label. She dropped out of high school but later earned her GED.

Due to the mainstream success of teen pop artist Britney Spears and Christina Aguilera, the label felt Simpson's debut album would perform just as well as, if not better than, Spears' and Aguilera's. Simpson immediately began working with producers such as Louis Biancaniello, Robbie Nevil, Evan Rogers and Cory Rooney. Biancaniello worked with Simpson on three of the album's eleven tracks, including "I Wanna Love You Forever", "Where You Are", and "Heart of Innocence". Simpson also met up with her then-boyfriend Nick Lachey, who already had a growing fanbase due to his work with boy-band 98 Degrees. Together, the couple recorded a duet, titled "Where You Are".

== Writing and production ==
"Where You Are" was written by Sam Watters and Louis Biancaniello (the two also produced the album) with the help of A. Stamatopoulou. "Where You Are" is a classic pop ballad that talks about love, similar to other songs of the era in which it was released as a single, as "Walk Me Home" by Mandy Moore and "I Turn to You" by Christina Aguilera. It was composed in the key of G minor and has a tempo of 76 beats per minute. Simpson's vocal range extends from F_{3} to D_{5}. The lyrics of "Where You Are" is constructed in verse–chorus form and is centered on the first love. "Where You Are" is a sweet, graceful melancholy ballad built mainly based on a piano melody.

== Chart performance ==
"Where You Are" failed to reach the top 50 on the US Billboard Hot 100, peaking at number 62. However, the song did become a relative Adult Contemporary hit. The song failed to chart on Hot Dance Music/Club Play chart but became a hit on the Hot Dance Music/Maxi-Singles Sales chart, reaching number four. Billboard magazine explained this contradiction by pointing out that the physical single included a previously unreleased remix of "I Wanna Love You Forever", which may have benefited sales. The single went on to sell around 100,000 copies within the United States alone. Internationally, the song was only released in Canada.

== Music video ==
Directed by Kevin Bray, the video of "Where You Are" is relatively low key and features Lachey and Simpson singing to each other. Due to the song's dark nature, the film stock is graduated to align with pale tones that can be seen in the video. As the video is also from the Here on Earth soundtrack, the video features scenes from the film.

== Awards ==
=== Teen Choice Awards ===
Year	Nominee / work	Award	Result
2000	Where You Are	Choice Breakout	Won
2000	Where You Are	Choice Love Song	Won

== Track listings ==
US maxi-CD

1. "Where You Are" (album version) – 4:32
2. "Where You Are" (Lenny B's club mix) – 10:55
3. "Where You Are" (Lenny B's dub mix) – 7:14
4. "Where You Are" (Lenny B's Bonus Beats) – 2:30
5. "I Wanna Love You Forever" (Soul Solution extended club vocal version) – 9:28

== Charts ==
=== Weekly charts ===
Chart (2000)	Peak position
Canada Top Singles (RPM)	22
Canada Adult Contemporary (RPM)	66
US Billboard Hot 100	62
US Adult Contemporary (Billboard)	23
US Dance Singles Sales (Billboard) with "I Wanna Love You Forever"	4
US Pop Airplay (Billboard)	22

=== Year-end charts ===
Chart (2000)	Position
US Hot Dance Maxi/Singles Sales	16

== Release history ==
Region	Date	Format(s)	Label(s)	Ref.
United States	February 21, 2000	Adult contemporary; hot adult contemporary radio	Columbia	
United States	February 22, 2000	Contemporary hit radio	Columbia	
United States	May 2, 2000	12-inch vinyl; maxi CD	Columbia	
