= I Wanna Love You Forever =

1999 single by Jessica Simpson

Single by Jessica Simpson

from the album Sweet Kisses
- B-side: "I Can, I Will", "You Don't Know What Love Is"
- Released: August 30, 1999
- Studio: Homesite 13 (Novato, California)
- Genre: Pop
- Length: 4:24
- Label: Columbia
- Songwriters: Louis Biancaniello, Sam Watters
- Producers: Louis Biancaniello, Sam Watters

Jessica Simpson singles chronology
"I Wanna Love You Forever" (1999)	"Where You Are" (2000)

Audio sample
- file; help

Music video
- "I Wanna Love You Forever" on Youtube.com

"I Wanna Love You Forever" is the debut single of American recording artist Jessica Simpson. The song was released on August 30, 1999, by Columbia Records as the lead single from Simpson's debut studio album, Sweet Kisses (1999). Written and produced by Louis Biancaniello and Sam Watters, "I Wanna Love You Forever" is a pop power ballad.

Upon its release, "I Wanna Love You Forever" received positive reviews from critics, many praised Simpson's vocal performance. It achieved international success, and established Simpson's name in the music industry. The song reached number three on the Billboard Hot 100, becoming Simpson's only top ten single, and was certified platinum by the Recording Industry Association of America (RIAA). Elsewhere, the single reached the top 10 in seven countries and the top 40 in 11 additional countries.

An accompanying music video for "I Wanna Love You Forever" was directed by Bille Woodruff. It centers on Jessica in a photo shoot while she also poses around a field of sunflowers. The single is generally considered to be one of her signature songs, and is her most successful single in the United States to date.

== Background ==
Simpson first developed and nurtured her talent in her local Baptist church, where her father also worked as the congregation's youth minister. At age twelve, she unsuccessfully auditioned for The Mickey Mouse Club. While attending a church camp, at the age of 13, Simpson sang "I Will Always Love You" and an arrangement of "Amazing Grace". One of the camp's visitors was launching a Gospel music record label and saw great promise and profits in her voice. It was during this time, while attending J. J. Pearce High School, that Simpson signed to Proclaim Records, a minor Gospel music record label. She recorded an album, Jessica, but Proclaim went bankrupt and the album was never officially released except for a small pressing funded by her grandmother. This small pressing gained her minor attention which led her to performing at concerts with other gospel legendary acts such as Kirk Franklin, God's Property, and CeCe Winans. When she was sixteen years old, Columbia Records executive Tommy Mottola heard Jessica, he was impressed with Simpson's musical talent and skill. Mottola instantly thought Simpson sounded like Mariah Carey. Simpson was immediately signed to the label. She dropped out of high school but later earned her GED.

Simpson immediately began working with producers such as Louis Biancaniello, Robbie Nevil, Evan Rogers, and Cory Rooney. Biancaniello worked with Simpson on three of the album's eleven tracks, including "I Wanna Love You Forever".

== Song details and composition ==
"I Wanna Love You Forever" was written, composed and produced by Louis Biancaniello and Sam Watters. Lyrically, the track is a somewhat dark and bittersweet love ballad, in which the singer describes her dramatic feelings of deep love and yearning for a man, in a way she has never experienced before. In the chorus, she sings: “I wanna love you forever, and this is all I'm asking of you. Ten thousand lifetimes together; is that so much for you to do? 'Cause from the moment that I saw your face, and felt the fire in your sweet embrace, I swear, I knew…I'm gonna love you forever.”

Although Biancaniello and Watters are given joint credit for writing and composing the song, at present, it is not known precisely which of the two was the primary lyricist and/or composer. According to the sheet music book (published by Hal Leonard Corporation) on Musicnotes.com, "I Wanna Love You Forever" has a common-time (4/4) metre with a beat rate of 80 beats per minute (BPM). It is set in the key of E minor, with Simpson's voice ranging from the tonal nodes of A_{3} to G_{5}, which is one tone shy of 2 octaves. The song follows a basic sequence of I–II–IV–II–VV progression.

== Critical reception ==
The song received generally positive reviews from music critics, and many praised Simpson's vocal performance. AllMusic editor Stephen Thomas Erlewine wrote that "I Wanna Love You Forever" gives Simpson "a chance to show off the richness of her voice. She doesn't over-sing, even if she has moments where she pushes the envelope slightly – just like her idol Dion." J.D. Considine from The Baltimore Sun compared her to singers like Mariah Carey, Whitney Houston and Christina Aguilera, noting the "diva-esque theatrics" on the song. Billboard described it as a "lush melodrama, complete with a raise-the-roof bridge, a theme of desperate devotion (...) and a vocal so fraught with emotion, it'll bring tears to the eyes as it wrings out every potential ounce of feeling from the song." The magazine added that Simpson "has a vocal command Celine would admire" and that the song "is so bombastic that some may consider it cheesy, but it's been a good while since a song of this brand has been issued, making it an instant brow-raiser." Editor Chuck Taylor called it a "deliciously over-the-top ballad" that "swept through the hearts of the nation". Can't Stop the Pop said it "is unashamedly steeped in melodrama", adding that "there's an unrelenting urgency to her performance where it genuinely feels as if she's singing for her life".

Elysa Gardner from the Los Angeles Times stated that Simpson "obviously [has] been studying Mariah Carey since childhood" (Simpson is an admitted Carey fan) and added that the "power ballad" single cast her as a "generic diva". Kyle Anderson from MTV complimented Simpson as "a second-generation Celine Dion", and stated that "I Wanna Love You Forever" is a "pretty traditional ballad", but still a "towering achievement". He wrote that Simpson "sits back and belts like the Titanic is sinking, and it's produced with a majestic, almost stoic air of dignity. Her voice is for real, and the chorus of the song ("From the moment that I saw your face/ And felt the fire of your sweet embrace/ I swear I knew I'm gonna love you forever") has an epic prom song quality. It's no wonder it nearly topped the Billboard Hot 100." People Magazine said that the song is a "breathless hit". Bob Waliszewski of Plugged In (publication) wrote that "I Wanna Love You Forever", "pledges lifelong love to a partner." Jenna Bergstrom from Pueblo Chieftain commented that the song is "so powerful" in her review of Sweet Kisses. Sun-Sentinel said that Simpson "has a powerful voice that gives a new sound to pop music." Vibe noted the song as "beautiful" and added that it is "a classic big ballad, complete with seemingly impossible-to-reach high notes and a soaring melody."

== Commercial performance ==
=== United States ===
In the United States, "I Wanna Love You Forever" was serviced to radio on August 30, 1999, and was released as a CD single on September 28, 1999. It was ultimately a success in North America by the end of the year. The single entered at No. 69 on the US Billboard Hot 100, with sales of 18,500 units. The single eventually rose to No. 3 over the following weeks, remaining in that position for five consecutive weeks, with a total of 20 weeks on the chart (18/20 spent within the Top 40). The single also reached No. 1 for six consecutive weeks on the Hot Singles Sales chart, and was certified Platinum by the RIAA. On January 22, 2000, Billboard reported that "I Wanna Love You Forever" was the 18th best-selling single of 1999, with 800,000 units sold (in 1999). "I Wanna Love You Forever" was the eleventh best-selling physical single of the 2000s, according to Nielsen SoundScan. It also became Simpson's best-selling physical single to date.

The single experienced a significant level of airplay, reaching the Top 20 on the Hot 100 Airplay chart. In Canada, "I Wanna Love You Forever" peaked at No. 9 (Nielsen Soundscan) and No. 2 in Mexico (Notimex International).

=== Europe and Oceania ===
In Europe, "I Wanna Love You Forever" successfully entered the charts. The single was positioned at No. 6 for three non-consecutive weeks on the Hot 100 Singles European chart, with fourteen weeks on the music list. In the United Kingdom, the single entered directly into the Top 10 on 27 March 2000; it managed to reach No. 7 in the country. The single remained on the charts for eleven weeks, the longest British run of Simpson's singles, matched only later by "These Boots Are Made for Walkin". In Sweden, the single peaked at No. 5 for three consecutive weeks, was certified Gold by the local IFPI for having surpassed 20,000 units sold, and remained for fourteen weeks on the music list, being Simpson's most successful single in the country to date.

Elsewhere in Europe, the single was also successful, including in Norway (No. 3), Switzerland (No. 7), Belgian Wallonia (No. 8), Portugal (No. 9), Scotland (No. 10), Belgian Flanders (No. 11), the Netherlands (No. 12), Finland (No. 12), Denmark (No. 13), Ireland (No. 13), Spain (No. 14) and Italy (No. 17). Additionally, it peaked at No. 25 in Austria, No. 26 in Iceland, and No. 27 in Germany.

In Oceania, "I Wanna Love You Forever" was a success; in Australia, the single entered the charts at No. 20 on 15 February 2000, ascending in its fourth week of stay on the music list to the No. 9 position, where it remained for two consecutive weeks. The single eventually stayed for five consecutive weeks in the top ten in Australia, and was certified Platinum by the ARIA after surpassing 70,000 units sold. In New Zealand, the single initially entered the charts on 14 February 2000 at No. 46, ascending the next week to the No. 16 spot.

== Music video ==
As her debut video, careful attention was made to make sure that Jessica's virginal image would be used as the "anti-sex appeal" to draw viewers in. Directed by Bille Woodruff, the video does not follow the dramatic story told in the song at all and instead centers on Jessica in a photo shoot. The photo shoot starts with Simpson being photographed in front of a red Waco YMF-5C Biplane as she wears a white outfit with a blue jacket. The song then shifts to a new scene in which Ms. Simpson has removed her jacket and is now in front of sunflowers.

The video seems to take things slowly, but in a dramatic turn of events, the sunflower scene is literally pushed over, to reveal the song's final scene: Simpson covered only in black on a dramatic soundstage lighted with blue lights. The video also features shots intercut with the making of the video of Jessica and her personal girlfriends. One of those girlfriends in the video is Jessica's little sister, Ashlee Simpson. Although the video shoot is commonly believed to be a fake one, it appears that the video breaks the fourth wall, as photos of the photographer taking photos apparently exist.

Jessica has confirmed that another video - co-starring actor Ashton Kutcher - was actually filmed but never released. According to Jessica, the original video was shelved because her hair was wavy and record label executives wanted her hair to be straight.

The video debuted on TRL on November 23, 1999, at number 10.

== Formats and track listings ==
These are the formats and track listings of major single releases of "I Wanna Love You Forever".

- US CD single (Cat #38K 79262)
- Japanese CD single (Cat #SRCS 2125)
1. "I Wanna Love You Forever" [Album Version] – 4:24
2. "Final Heartbreak" [Snippet] – 1:09
3. "Woman in Me" (featuring Destiny's Child) [Snippet] – 1:28
4. "I've Got My Eyes on You" [Snippet] – 1:00
5. "Your Faith in Me" [Snippet] – 1:29
- Australian CD single (Cat #667803 2)
1. "I Wanna Love You Forever" [Album Version] – 4:24
2. "I Wanna Love You Forever" [Soul Solution Remix Radio Edit] – 4:08
3. "I Can, I Will" – 3:30
4. "Multimedia"
- European CD single (Cat #6688532)
1. "I Wanna Love You Forever" [Album Version] – 4:24
2. "I Wanna Love You Forever" [Soul Solution Remix Radio Edit] – 4:08
3. "I Wanna Love You Forever" [Soul Solution Extended Club Vox] – 9:29
4. "I Wanna Love You Forever" [Soul Solution Vonuz Beats] – 3:29
- UK CD single (Cat #6691272)
1. "I Wanna Love You Forever" [Album Version] – 4:24
2. "I Can, I Will" – 3:34
3. "You Don't Know What Love Is" – 3:29
- UK CD 2 (Cat #6691275)
1. "I Wanna Love You Forever" [Album Version] – 4:24
2. "I Wanna Love You Forever" [Soda Club Radio Edit] – 3:30
3. "I Wanna Love You Forever" [Soul Solution Radio Edit] – 3:29
- UK cassette single (Cat #6691274)
1. "I Wanna Love You Forever" [Album Version] – 4:24
2. "I Wanna Love You Forever" [Soda Club Radio Edit] – 4:04

== Charts ==
=== Weekly charts ===
Chart (1999–2000)	Peak position
Australia (ARIA)	9
Austria (Ö3 Austria Top 40)	25
Belgium (Ultratop 50 Flanders)	11
Belgium (Ultratop 50 Wallonia)	8
Canada Top Singles (RPM)	12
Canada Adult Contemporary (RPM)	42
Canada (Nielsen SoundScan)	9
Denmark (IFPI)	13
Europe (European Hot 100 Singles)	11
Finland (Suomen virallinen lista)	12
France (SNEP)	100
Germany (GfK)	27
Iceland (Íslenski Listinn Topp 40)	26
Ireland (IRMA)	13
Italy (FIMI)	17
Italy Airplay (Music & Media)	9
Mexico International (Notimex)	2
Netherlands (Dutch Top 40)	12
Netherlands (Single Top 100)	14
New Zealand (Recorded Music NZ)	16
Norway (VG-lista)	3
Portugal (AFP)	9
Scottish Singles Sales (Official Charts)	10
Spain (Promusicae)	14
Sweden (Sverigetopplistan)	5
Switzerland (Schweizer Hitparade)	7
UK Singles (Official Charts)	7
US Billboard Hot 100	3
US Adult Contemporary (Billboard)	25
US Dance Singles Sales (Billboard) with "Where You Are"	4
US Pop Airplay (Billboard)	13
US Rhythmic Airplay (Billboard)	34

=== Year-end charts ===
Chart (2000)	Position
Australia (ARIA)	39
Belgium (Ultratop 50 Flanders)	58
Belgium (Ultratop 50 Wallonia)	43
Europe (Eurochart Hot 100)	77
Netherlands (Dutch Top 40)	81
Netherlands (Single Top 100)	87
Sweden (Hitlistan)	48
Switzerland (Schweizer Hitparade)	36
UK Singles (OCC)	151
US Billboard Hot 100	56

== Certifications and sales ==
Region	Certification	Certified units/sales
Australia (ARIA)	Platinum	70,000^{^}
Belgium (BRMA)	Gold	25,000^{*}
Sweden (GLF)	Gold	15,000^{^}
United Kingdom	—	103,000
United States (RIAA)	Platinum	800,000
^{*} Sales figures based on certification alone.^{^} Shipments figures based on certification alone.

== Release history ==
Region	Date	Format(s)	Label	Ref(s).
United States	August 30, 1999	Various	Columbia	
United States	August 31, 1999	Contemporary hit radio	Columbia	
United States	September 28, 1999	CD; cassette	Columbia	
Japan	November 26, 1999	CD	SME	
United Kingdom	April 10, 2000	CD; cassette	Columbia	
