= Jessica Simpson =

American singer and actress (born 1980)

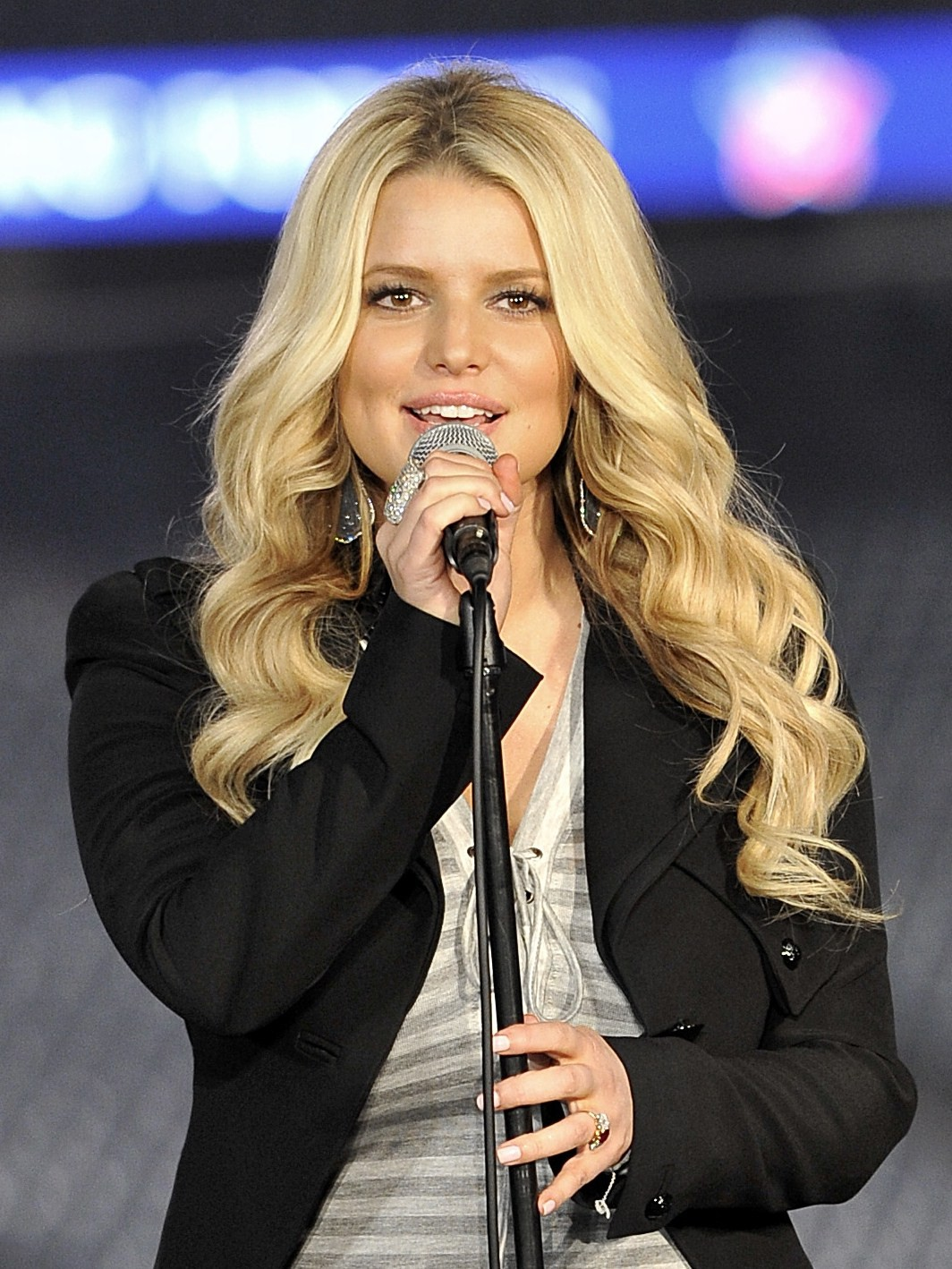
- Simpson performing in 2011
- Born: Jessica Ann Simpson; July 10, 1980 (age 46); Abilene, Texas, U.S.
- Education: J.J. Pearce High School; Texas Tech High School
- Occupations: Singer; actress; fashion designer
- Years active: 1993–present
- Organization: The Jessica Simpson Collection
- Spouses: Nick Lachey (m. 2002; div. 2006) Eric Johnson (m. 2014; sep. 2025)
- Children: 3
- Relatives: Ashlee Simpson (sister)
- Awards: Full list
- Musical career
- Genres: Pop; country
- Instrument: Vocals
- Labels: Columbia; Epic; Primary Wave; BMG; Nashville Canyon
- Website: jessicasimpson.com

Jessica Ann Johnson (née Simpson; born July 10, 1980) is an American singer, actress, and fashion designer. After performing in church choirs as a child, Simpson signed with Columbia Records in 1997 at age seventeen. Her debut studio album, Sweet Kisses (1999), sold two million copies in the United States and produced the Billboard Hot 100 top-three single "I Wanna Love You Forever." She adopted a more mature image for her second studio album, Irresistible (2001), whose title track reached the top 20 of the Billboard Hot 100. Her third studio album, In This Skin (2003), sold three million copies in the United States.

Simpson gained wider public recognition through her marriage to Nick Lachey and their MTV reality television series Newlyweds: Nick and Jessica (2003–2005). Following the release of her first Christmas album, ReJoyce: The Christmas Album (2004), Simpson made her film debut as Daisy Duke in The Dukes of Hazzard (2005) and recorded a cover of "These Boots Are Made for Walkin'" for its soundtrack.

Simpson released her fifth studio album, A Public Affair, and appeared in the comedy film Employee of the Month in 2006. With her sixth studio album, Do You Know (2008), she ventured into country music. Her second Christmas album, Happy Christmas, followed in 2010. Simpson has sold over 30 million albums worldwide.

Outside of music, Simpson launched The Jessica Simpson Collection in 2005, which grew into a fashion and lifestyle brand with $1 billion in annual retail sales. After selling a majority stake in the company in 2015, Simpson and her mother regained full ownership in 2021. She also starred in the reality television series The Price of Beauty in 2010 and served as a mentor on Fashion Star from 2012 to 2013.

Simpson published her memoir, Open Book, in 2020, which topped The New York Times Best Seller list. After an extended hiatus from recording, she returned to music in 2025 with the extended plays Nashville Canyon, Part 1 and Nashville Canyon, Part 2.

== Life and career ==
=== 1980–1991: Childhood and early life ===
Jessica Ann Simpson was born on July 10, 1980, in Abilene, Texas. She is the first child of Tina Ann Simpson (née Drew), a homemaker, and Joseph Simpson, a minister. Her parents married in 1978 and divorced in 2013. Simpson has stated that she grew up in Dallas and Waco, while her parents later settled in McGregor, Texas. She has a younger sister, Ashlee Simpson.

In her preteens, Simpson briefly attended Amelia Middle School while her father conducted outreach work in Cincinnati, Ohio. After returning to Texas 20 months later, she attended J. J. Pearce High School in Richardson. She left school in 1997 as her career began to take off and earned her GED the following year through distance learning from Texas Tech High School.

Simpson is a practicing Christian. She was raised in a strict evangelical household and was given a purity ring by her father, a Southern Baptist pastor, when she was twelve years old. She later reflected that in her home, "it was a sin if I felt anything sexual or did anything sexual." Simpson's family moved frequently because of her father's ministry, living primarily in Texas but spending several years in the Midwest. As a child, Simpson began singing in the choir at her local Baptist church. At age eleven, while attending a church retreat, she began aspiring to become a singer.

=== 1991-1998: Career beginnings ===
The following year, she auditioned for The Mickey Mouse Club, performing "Amazing Grace" and dancing to "Ice Ice Baby." She advanced through several rounds and became a semi-finalist alongside future artists including Britney Spears, Christina Aguilera, and Justin Timberlake. Simpson later said that she became nervous during her final audition after seeing Aguilera perform and was ultimately not selected for the show.

Simpson subsequently resumed performing in her church choir, where she was discovered by the head of a Christian music label. After hearing her perform Dolly Parton's "I Will Always Love You," he signed her to Proclaim Records. Simpson began recording her debut album and touring to promote the project. Her father later claimed that she stopped touring after her physical appearance was considered too "sexual" for the Christian music market.

Her debut album, Jessica, remained unreleased after Proclaim Records went bankrupt, although her grandmother personally funded a limited pressing of the album. Copies of Jessica were subsequently sent to various record labels and producers, leading to several auditions. Simpson eventually attracted the attention of Tommy Mottola, head of Columbia Records, who signed her to the label at the recommendation of talent scout Teresa LaBarbera Whites. Mottola said of Simpson, "She had a great little look and a great attitude, a fresh new face, and something a bit different than Britney and all of them; she could actually sing."

Simpson began working on her major-label debut album in Orlando, Florida. Mottola sought to market her as a contrast to Britney Spears and Christina Aguilera, whose early careers incorporated more prominent elements of dancing and sexuality. During this period, Simpson enlisted her father, Joe, as her manager, while her mother became her stylist.

=== 1999–2001: Career breakthrough, Sweet Kisses and Irresistible ===
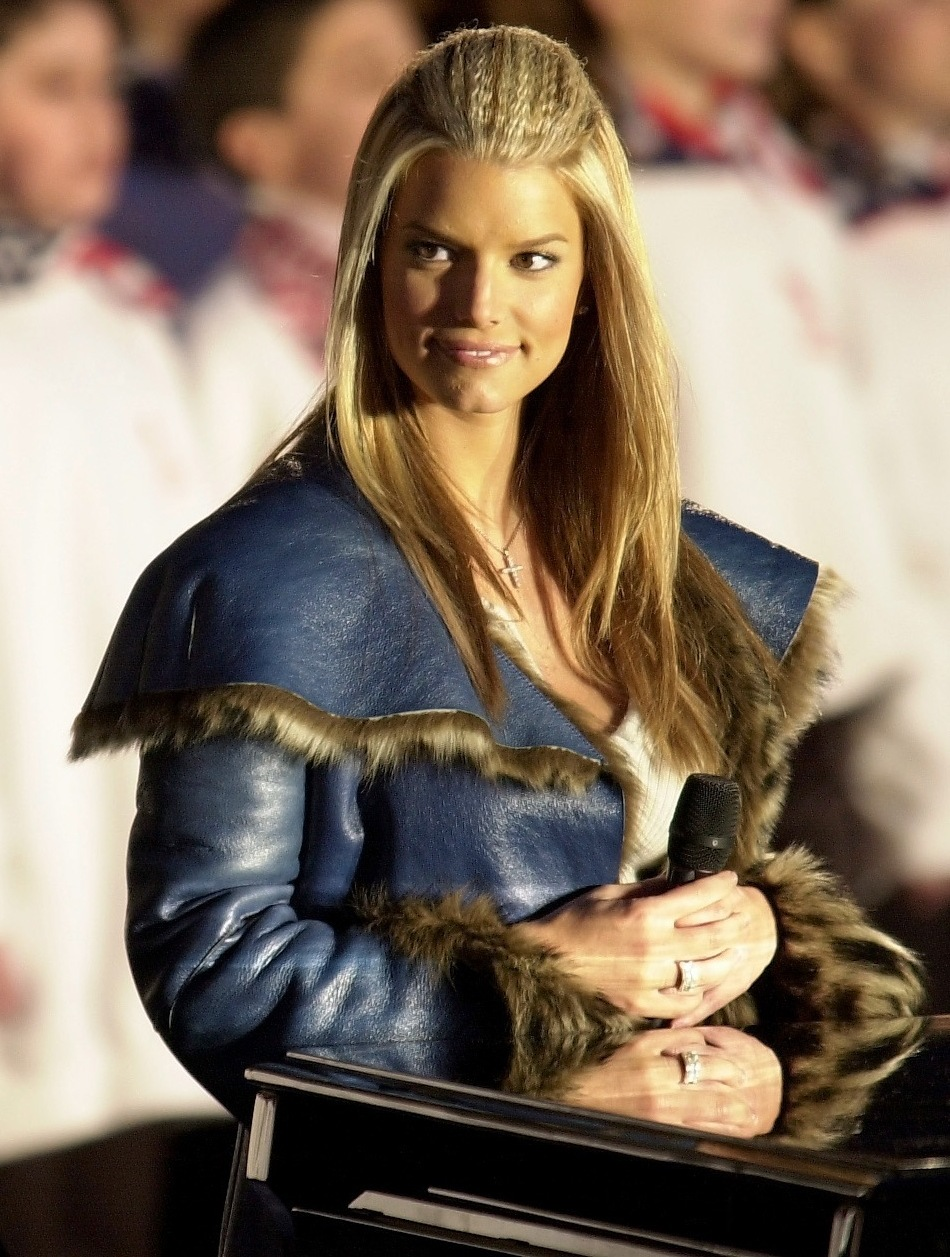
Simpson in January 2001, at the first inauguration of George W. Bush

Simpson began working on her debut studio album in 1998. Its lead single, "I Wanna Love You Forever", was released on September 28, 1999. The song reached number three on the Billboard Hot 100 in the United States and was certified platinum by the Recording Industry Association of America (RIAA) for sales exceeding one million copies.

Simpson's debut studio album, Sweet Kisses, was released on November 23, 1999. It sold 65,000 copies in its first week and debuted at number 65 on the Billboard 200 in the United States. The album also achieved commercial success in several European countries. The following year, "Where You Are." featuring Simpson's then-boyfriend Nick Lachey, was released as the album's second single. "I Think I'm in Love with You" was released as the third and final single and achieved commercial success in the United States. Following the song's release, Sweet Kisses reached a new peak of number 25 on the Billboard 200 in August 2000. The album sold over two million copies in the United States and was certified double platinum by the RIAA. Simpson promoted the album throughout 2000 as an opening act on 98 Degrees' Heat It Up Tour.

Work on Simpson's second studio album began in 2000, with Simpson adopting a more mature public image during its production. Reflecting on the change in July 2001, she explained, "I recorded [Sweet Kisses] when I was seventeen years old and I'm twenty-one [this month] so there is four years of growth involved." The album's title track, "Irresistible", was released as its lead single in April 2001 and became Simpson's second top-20 hit on the Billboard Hot 100. Her second studio album, Irresistible, was released on May 25, 2001. It sold 127,000 copies in the United States during its first week and debuted at number six on the Billboard 200. Despite nearly doubling the first-week sales of Sweet Kisses, the album sold fewer copies overall and was certified gold by the RIAA for sales of 500,000 copies. "A Little Bit" was released as the album's second and final single. In July 2001, Simpson performed as a co-headliner on the first 14 dates of the Total Request Live Tour, alongside artists including Destiny's Child and Nelly. On August 7, she embarked on the DreamChaser Tour, a 15-date tour of North America.

=== 2002–2005: Newlyweds, In This Skin and heightened success ===
In 2003, Simpson and Lachey began starring in the MTV reality television series Newlyweds: Nick and Jessica. Premiering on August 19, 2003, the series chronicled the couple's marriage and the recording of Simpson's third studio album. Newlyweds became a pop-culture phenomenon, with Simpson's on-screen persona and remarks perceived as naïve contributing to increased public attention for the couple. The series was a ratings success for MTV and aired for three seasons through 2005.

Simpson began working on her third studio album in 2002. Its lead single, "Sweetest Sin", was released on July 14, 2003, but achieved limited commercial success. Simpson released her third studio album, In This Skin, on August 19, 2003, the same day that Newlyweds: Nick and Jessica premiered, with the series helping promote the album. In This Skin debuted at number ten on the Billboard 200, selling 64,000 copies in its first week, Simpson's lowest first-week sales at the time. By December 2003, the album had sold over 565,000 copies in the United States. "With You" was released as the album's second single in October. It reached the top 20 of the Billboard Hot 100 and topped the Mainstream Top 40 chart. Simpson appeared in the halftime show of Super Bowl XXXVIII, although she did not perform musically. She subsequently recorded new material for a reissue of In This Skin, which was released in March 2004. Following the reissue, the album experienced a significant increase in sales and went on to sell three million copies in the United States. "Take My Breath Away" and "Angels" were released as singles from the reissue in 2004.

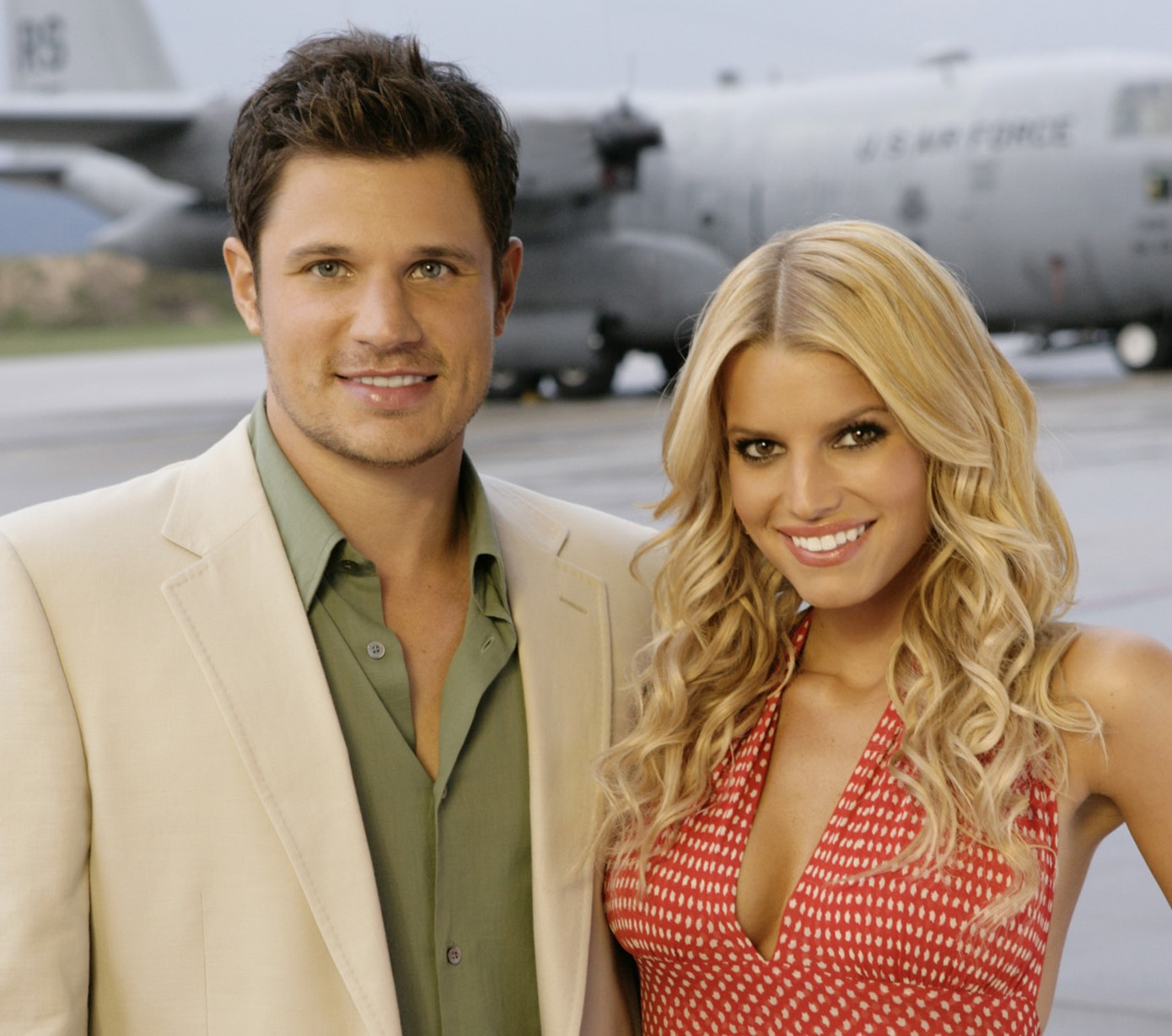
Simpson and then-husband Nick Lachey in 2005

Simpson and Lachey starred in the ABC special The Nick and Jessica Variety Hour in April 2004, which featured guest appearances by celebrities including Jewel and Mr. T. Simpson embarked on the North American Reality Tour in June, which continued through October. During this period, Simpson and Lachey made guest appearances on The Ashlee Simpson Show, which chronicled the beginning of her sister Ashlee's music career.

Simpson's fourth studio album, the Christmas-themed ReJoyce: The Christmas Album, was released on November 23, 2004. It peaked at number 14 on the Billboard 200 and was certified gold by the RIAA for sales exceeding 500,000 copies. Also in 2004, Simpson filmed a pilot for an ABC sitcom, though the network did not order the series. Simpson performed "The Star-Spangled Banner" at the Indy 500 in 2005.

In April 2004, Simpson and Randi Shinder launched Jessica Simpson Dessert Beauty, a line of edible cosmetics. In February 2005, they launched Dessert Treats, a second edible cosmetics line aimed at a younger audience. Both lines were later discontinued following lawsuits involving copyright and accounting disputes. That year, Simpson launched The Jessica Simpson Collection, initially partnering with Tarrant Apparel Group to release the Princy and JS by Jessica Simpson clothing lines. The business continued to expand, and by 2014 was reported to generate $1 billion in annual sales.

Simpson made her film debut as Daisy Duke in the film adaptation of The Dukes of Hazzard. The film received generally negative reviews from critics but grossed over $111 million worldwide. For the film's soundtrack, Simpson recorded "These Boots Are Made for Walkin'", a cover of the Nancy Sinatra song featuring additional lyrics. The song reached the top 20 of the Billboard Hot 100, becoming one of Simpson's highest-charting singles. Its music video featured Simpson in character as Daisy Duke and attracted controversy over its sexualized imagery, including scenes of her washing the General Lee while wearing a bikini.

=== 2006–2009: A Public Affair, continued movie career, and Do You Know ===
Simpson began working on her fifth studio album in 2005. On March 28, 2006, she announced that she had signed with Epic Records, ending her seven-year association with Columbia Records. That year, Simpson and stylist Ken Pavés launched a line of hair and beauty products on the Home Shopping Network. On June 29, Simpson released "A Public Affair" as the lead single from her fifth studio album. The song peaked at number 14 on the Billboard Hot 100 and was certified gold by the RIAA for sales exceeding 500,000 copies in the United States. Her fifth studio album, A Public Affair, was released on August 26 and debuted at number five on the Billboard 200 with first-week sales of 101,000 copies. The album sold just over 500,000 copies in the United States. "I Belong to Me" was released as the album's second and final single but achieved limited commercial success.

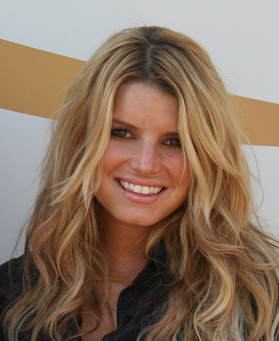
Simpson in June 2008

Simpson starred alongside Dane Cook and Dax Shepard in the comedy film Employee of the Month, released in October 2006. The film received generally negative reviews and had limited commercial success. That December, Simpson performed a cover of Dolly Parton's "9 to 5" as a tribute to Parton at the Kennedy Center Honors, though Simpson's performance was omitted from the broadcast.

In 2007, Simpson appeared alongside Luke Wilson in Blonde Ambition, which received a limited theatrical release in Texas before being released on home media. The following year, she starred in the direct-to-video film Private Valentine: Blonde & Dangerous, portraying an actress who joins the military. The film received generally negative reviews. In 2008, Simpson also collaborated with Parlux Fragrances to launch her first fragrance, Fancy, which was commercially successful.

Simpson began working on her sixth studio album, a country-influenced record, in 2007. She said that she had grown up around country music and wanted to "give something back" to the genre. "Come On Over" was released as the album's lead single on June 20, 2008. The song debuted at number 41 on the Billboard Hot Country Songs chart, setting a record at the time for the highest debut by an artist's first entry on the chart. Simpson's sixth studio album, Do You Know, was released on September 9, 2008. It sold 65,000 copies in its first week and debuted at number four on the Billboard 200. From January to March 2009, Simpson served as an opening act for country music group Rascal Flatts on their Bob That Head Tour.

=== 2010–2020: TV appearances and focus on business ventures ===
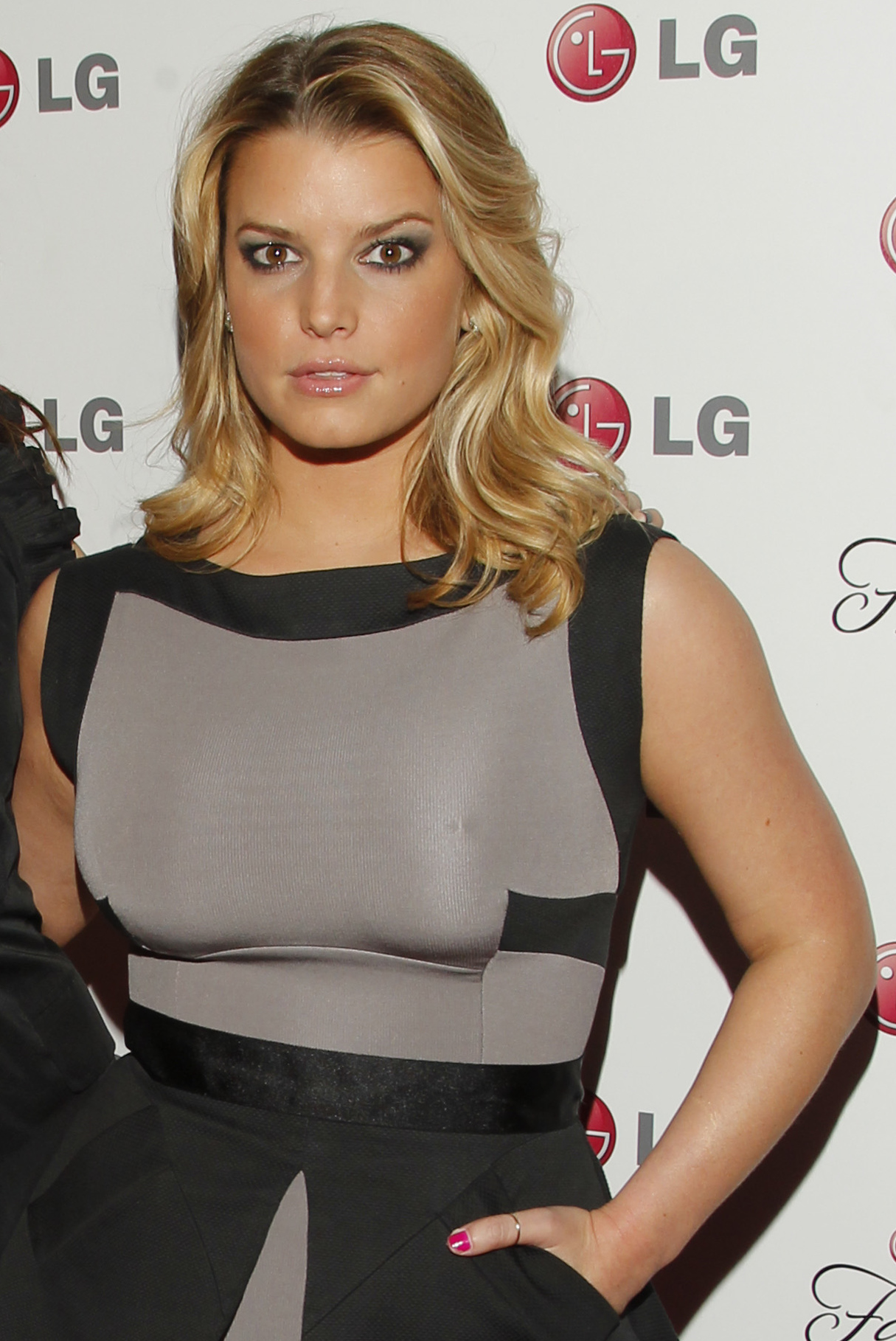
Simpson in May 2010

Simpson's VH1 documentary series, The Price of Beauty, began airing in March 2010. The series followed Simpson around the world as she explored differing perceptions of beauty across cultures. The premiere episode attracted one million viewers. Simpson announced that the series would return in 2011 with a revised format, but those plans never came to fruition.

On October 12, 2010, Epic Records released the compilation Playlist: The Very Best of Jessica Simpson, the final release under her three-album contract with the label. Simpson subsequently signed a new recording contract with eleveneleven and Primary Wave Music and released her Christmas-themed seventh studio album, Happy Christmas, on November 22, which peaked at number 123 on the Billboard 200 chart.

In May 2012, Simpson appeared alongside Nicole Richie as a mentor on the NBC reality television series Fashion Star, which aired for two seasons before concluding in 2013. The series featured aspiring designers competing to create clothing, with contestants eliminated throughout the competition.

Following the birth of her first child in 2012, Simpson launched a maternity clothing line later that year. In August 2012, she released the fragrance Vintage Bloom, and also introduced a bedroom decor line featuring bedding and draperies. In August 2014, Simpson released a self-titled signature fragrance. In 2015, she sold a majority stake in The Jessica Simpson Collection to Sequential Brands Group. That year, she appeared on the HSN channel to promote her products and launched Warm Up, a line of activewear available at retailers throughout the United States, which expanded to include athletic shoes in August 2016.

Simpson in December 2025

=== 2020–present: Open Book, Nashville Canyon and Netflix documentary ===
On February 2, 2020, Simpson released her memoir Open Book, which topped The New York Times Best Seller list and the Publishers Weekly Bestseller List, selling 59,360 units. In the book, she discussed her marriage to Nick Lachey, her relationship with musician John Mayer, sexual abuse she experienced during her childhood, dependence on alcohol and prescription drugs, and body image issues. Six new songs were released as part of the book, marking her first release of music since Happy Christmas in 2010.

In November 2021, Simpson and her mother Tina regained full ownership of The Jessica Simpson Collection, acquiring the majority stake that had been sold to Sequential Brands Group in 2015.

In 2022, Simpson appeared as herself in a voice role on the FOX animated sitcom Duncanville.

In February 2025, Simpson returned to music with the single "Use My Heart Against Me." Her debut extended play, Nashville Canyon, Part 1, was released on March 21, 2025, followed by Nashville Canyon, Part 2 in September of that year. In May 2025, Simpson performed on the season 23 finale of American Idol, marking her first television performance in 15 years. She promoted the EPs with the Nashville Canyon Tour, which continued through 2026. She was later featured on for KING + COUNTRY's single "my mosiac," which was released on September 18, 2026.

In November 2025, Simpson guest-starred in Hulu's All's Fair, marking her first non-reality television acting role since 2010. A documentary about her life and career, directed by filmmaker Joe Pearlman, is scheduled to be released on Netflix in 2027.

== Personal life ==
Simpson met 98 Degrees singer Nick Lachey at a Christmas party in 1998, and the two subsequently began dating. In July 2001, Simpson ended their relationship to focus on her career, though they reconciled in September.They became engaged in February 2002 and married on October 26 of that year in Austin, Texas. In November 2005, Simpson and Lachey announced their separation, and Simpson filed for divorce the following month, citing "irreconcilable differences;" their divorce was finalized on June 30, 2006.

Simpson had an on-again, off-again relationship with singer-songwriter John Mayer from August 2006 to May 2007. In November 2007, she began dating Dallas Cowboys quarterback Tony Romo. Their relationship attracted considerable media attention. Simpson and Romo ended their relationship in July 2009.

Simpson began dating former NFL player Eric Johnson in May 2010. The couple married in July 2014 in Montecito, California. They have three children: a daughter, Maxwell Drew, born in May 2012, a son, Ace Knute, born in June 2013, and a daughter, Birdie Mae, born in March 2019. In January 2025, Simpson announced that she and Johnson had separated. As of March 2026, the couple remained separated and were co-parenting their children.

In April 2026, Simpson was reported to be dating Nashville-based musician Thomas Eisenhood.

== Musical style ==
Simpson has cited Whitney Houston, Mariah Carey, Aretha Franklin and Sade as musical influences. Her early musical background was rooted in Christian music, and she has continued to incorporate Christian themes into some of her later material. Her debut album primarily consisted of pop ballads intended to showcase her vocals, with AllMusic critic Stephen Thomas Erlewine describing its sound as positioning Simpson as a "teen Celine Dion." The album included the power ballad "I Wanna Love You Forever," Her early work also drew comparisons to Carey.

With her 2001 album Irresistible, Simpson adopted a more upbeat pop sound and more provocative lyrical content, drawing comparisons to Britney Spears. Simpson attributed the shift in her musical style to her increased age and maturity. On In This Skin (2003), Simpson became more involved in songwriting and pursued a more "organic" sound than on her previous albums. AllMusic characterized the album as remaining within "the contemporary dance-pop realm" while moving toward a more adult-oriented style. Simpson later incorporated elements of country music into songs including "These Boots Are Made For Walkin'" (2005) and "Push Your Tush" (2006), while her fifth studio album incorporated elements of dance and disco. Influenced by country artists including Faith Hill, Shania Twain, and Martina McBride, Simpson subsequently moved more fully into country music with Do You Know (2008).

== Public image ==
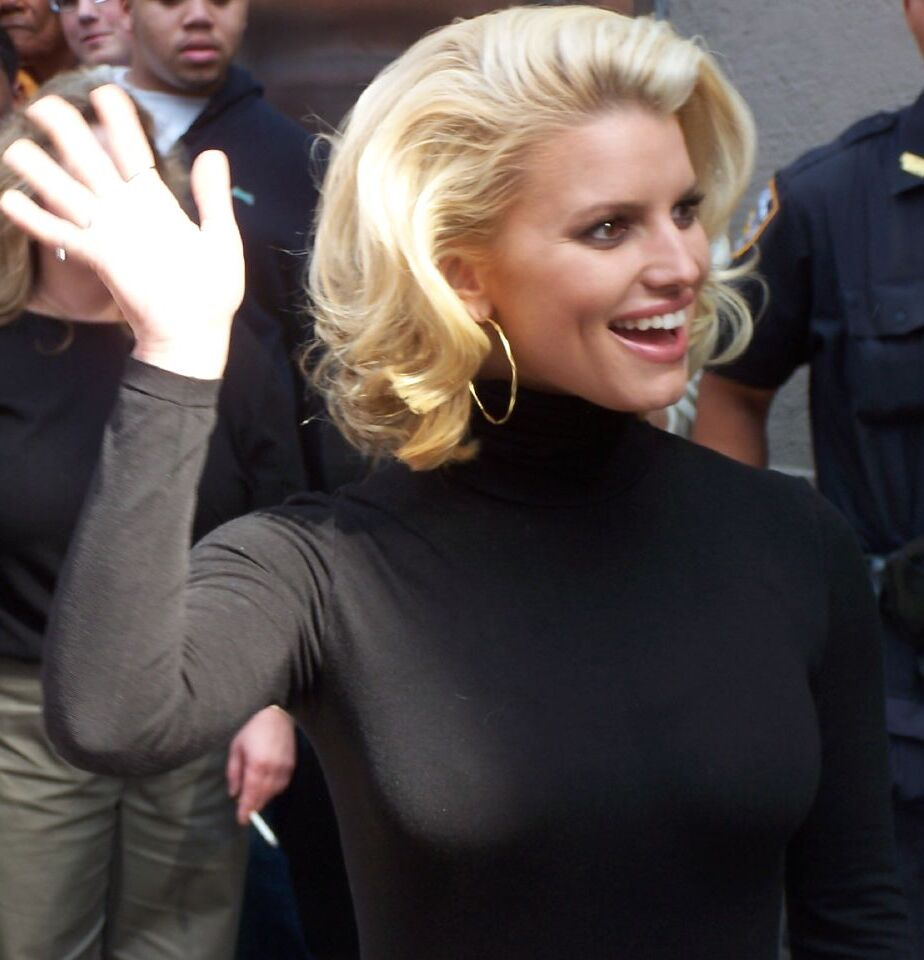
Simpson in October 2006

Simpson came to prominence as a teen idol in the late 1990s and was described by the media as Columbia Records's "blond response to Britney Spears and Christina Aguilera". Early in her career, her public image emphasized her Christian upbringing and decision to remain abstinent until marriage. She went through a "carefully orchestrated sexy makeover" while she promoted her second album, Irresistible (2001). She later said that Columbia Records executive Tommy Mottola attempted to control her appearance, including telling her to lose weight after she signed with the label.

Following the success of Newlyweds: Nick and Jessica in 2003, Simpson became closely associated with a "ditzy blonde" persona based on remarks and incidents featured on the series. The Washington Post later described her as an early example of a reality television star whose public identity became intertwined with her private life. In her 2020 memoir Open Book, Simpson reflected on the difficulty of maintaining a personal identity while her private life was being presented as entertainment.

Simpson has also been described as a sex symbol. Her portrayal of Daisy Duke in The Dukes of Hazzard (2005) furthered this image, particularly through the music video for "These Boots Are Made for Walkin'", which featured her washing a car while wearing a bikini. The scene was subsequently parodied in Pink's "Stupid Girls" music video. Simpson later said that the Daisy Duke image established a physical "gold standard" against which her appearance continued to be judged, and she received extensive media scrutiny over changes in her weight in 2009.

Although Simpson has distanced herself from aspects of the strict Southern Baptist environment in which she was raised, Christianity has remained part of her public identity. She has continued to discuss her faith publicly, describing it as an important part of her life.

== Philanthropy ==
In April 2004, Simpson performed at VH1's benefit concert Divas Live 2004, alongside Ashanti, Cyndi Lauper, Gladys Knight, Joss Stone, and Patti LaBelle, in support of the Save the Music Foundation. The following month, she performed a benefit concert in support of the Skin Care Foundation.

In March 2007, Simpson donated a Chrysler minivan to the Elim orphanage in Nuevo Laredo. She has also served as an ambassador for Soles4Souls, participating in fundraising efforts for the organization, and has worked with the Make-A-Wish Foundation.

== Filmography ==
=== Films ===
Year	Film	Role
2002	The Master of Disguise	Herself
2005	The Dukes of Hazzard	Daisy Duke
2006	Employee of the Month	Amy Renfro
2007	Blonde Ambition	Katie Gregerstitch
2008	The Love Guru	Herself
2008	Private Valentine: Blonde & Dangerous	Megan Valentine

=== Television ===
Year	Title	Role	Notes
2002–2003	That '70s Show	Annette	Recurring role (Season 5)
2003	The Twilight Zone	Miranda Evans	Episode: "The Collection"
2003	Punk'd	Herself	Episode #6
2003–2005	Newlyweds: Nick and Jessica	Herself	Reality television
2003	Room Raiders	Herself	Guest
2004	The Nick and Jessica Variety Hour	Herself	Television special
2004	Nick and Jessica's Family Christmas	Herself	Television special
2004	A2Z	Comedian Panelist	Episode: "Jessica Simpson and Nick Lachey"
2004–2005	The Ashlee Simpson Show	Herself	Reality television
2008	Dancing with the Stars	Guest Performer	Episode: "Round 2: Results"
2009	I Get That a Lot	Herself	Episode: "Jessica Simpson"
2010	Project Runway	Guest judge	Episode: "Finale Part 2"
2010	The Price of Beauty	Herself	Reality television
2010	Entourage	Herself	Episode: "Bottoms Up"
2012	The Biggest Loser	Herself	Episode: "Episode #13.11"
2012–2013	Fashion Star	Judge / Mentor	11 episodes
2014	Funny or Die Presents	Daisy Duke	Episode: "The Babadooks of Hazzard"
2018	Ashlee + Evan	Herself	Episode: "I Do"
2022	Duncanville	Herself (voice)	Episode: "Clothes and Dagger"
2025	American Idol	Herself	Episode: "Grand Finale"
2025	All's Fair	Lee-Ann Hunt	Episode: "I Want Revenge"

== Discography ==
- Sweet Kisses (1999)
- Irresistible (2001)
- In This Skin (2003)
- ReJoyce: The Christmas Album (2004)
- A Public Affair (2006)
- Do You Know (2008)
- Happy Christmas (2010)

== Tours ==
Headlining

- DreamChaser Tour (2001)
- Reality Tour (2004)
- Nashville Canyon (2024-2026)

Co-headlining

- Total Request Live Tour (with various artists) (2001)

Opening act

- Livin' la Vida Loca Tour (Ricky Martin) (1999)
- Heat It Up Tour (98 Degrees) (2000)
- Bob That Head Tour (Rascal Flatts) (2009)

== See also ==
- List of awards and nominations received by Jessica Simpson
