= Sam Eckholm =

American veteran and influencer

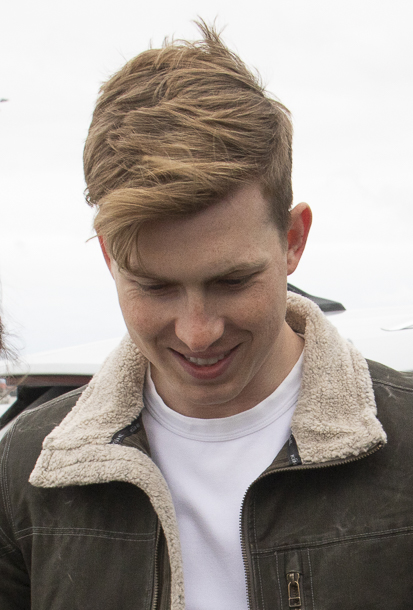
- Eckholm in 2025
- Born: (born February 11, 1996).
- Occupations: Influencer; Veteran; Documentarian
- Awards: Air Force Commendation Medal, Forbes 30 under 30

Sam Eckholm (born February 11, 1996) is an American United States Air Force veteran, influencer, and documentarian. He is best known for his YouTube videos, which have been described as taking viewers behind the scenes of the military. He was listed in Forbes 30 under 30 in 2026.

== Biography ==
Eckholm is the son of an Air Force pilot, and attended J.J. Pearce High School in the Dallas suburb of Richardson, Texas, graduating in 2014. After high school, he attended the United States Air Force Academy, where he graduated in 2018. He studied legal studies. After college, he became a public affairs officer for the Air Force, where he first worked with the F-22 Raptor demonstration team for two years before moving to work with Air Mobility Command.

He left active duty in 2023, and subsequently relocated to San Francisco, where he launched SE Media. He partnered with the United States Air Force in 2024, and subsequently partnered with both the Air Force and the United States Space Force in 2025. He launched his new series Access Granted in 2026.

He describes himself as a storyteller, not an influencer. His videos, of which he's created more than three dozen, are one of the most watched aerospace and defense video series in the world. His episodes have focused on topics including Navy crews in the Arctic and Iceland, the Royal Air Force, the Swedish Navy, and the F35B fighter jet, as well as his father flying the Boeing KC-135 Stratotanker.

In addition to the Air and Space Forces, he has partnered with NATO, the United States Secret Service, Boeing, Raytheon, Lockheed Martin, and Pratt & Whitney. He is signed with CAA.

As of 2026, he had over 2.5 million followers. He has had over one billion views.

His nine-video partnership with the United States Air Force and United States Space Force was awarded a Shorty Award. Eckholm was also listed in Forbes 30 Under 30 in the Social Media section in 2026.

He also teaches a course called the "Air Force Academy Blueprint".

== Personal life ==
Eckholm is openly gay. He is engaged to United Airlines Boeing 787 First Officer Swayne Martin. They have been in a relationship for over six years.
