= Delux =

Pop Rock Band

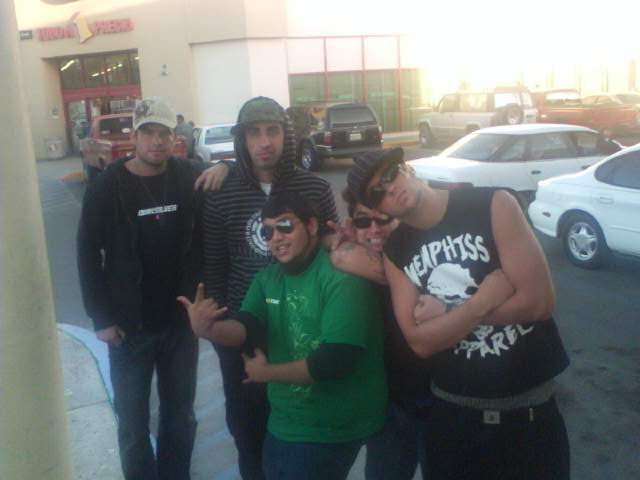
- The band (with a fan in front in the green shirt)

Background information
- Origin: Tijuana, Baja California, Mexico
- Genres: Pop rock
- Years active: 2000–present
- Labels: Sony BMG
- Members: Mo Pérez; Leo Ramírez; Nacho Rojas; Luis “Chocs” Campos
- Past members: Alex Ortega (2004–2012); Jesse Huizar (2012–2015); Damian Davila (2002–2012)
- Website: www.delux.com.mx

Delux is a pop rock band formed in Tijuana, Mexico, in the summer of 2000. The group is influenced by 1980s new wave music and the SoCal punk scene. Their 2005 debut self-titled record spawned three music videos which included an MTV VMA Nomination for Best New Artist. In 2007 they released Entre La Guerra y El Amor under major label (Sony/BMG) which allowed them to reach a more diverse and larger audience. In 2010, Delux released a bilingual album, which propelled them to be named one of the most influential Hispanic rock bands of the Internet era. They appeared on Alternative Press's 100 bands to watch in 2008.

== Band members ==
- Mauricio Pérez – Guitar, vocals
- Leonardo Ramirez – Guitar, vocals
- Luis “Chocs” Campos – Drums
- Nacho Rojas – Bass, vocals

== Discography ==
- Delux (2004)
- Entre la Guerra y el Amor (2007)
- $ (2010)
- Descontrol (2019)
- Punto Cardinal (2024)

== Singles ==
- "Más de lo que te Imaginas"
- "Chat Noir" (video featuring live concert clips)
- "Apague el Sol"
- "Entre la Guerra y el Amor"
- "Dime"
- "Quien Comparte tu Silencio"
- "Get the Money" (animated video)
- "Hey Lover"
- "Alarma!"
- "To live and die in TJ"
- "Infatuacion" (filmed live at House of Blues sunset strip U.S.A.)
- "Tu Piel"
- "Lentamente"
