= The Jessica Simpson Collection =

Fashion line of clothing

- Company type: Private
- Industry: Fashion
- Founded: 2005
- Founder: Jessica Simpson; Tina Simpson
- Headquarters: Los Angeles, California, U.S.
- Products: Clothing, shoes, perfume, luggage, and accessories
- Revenue: ▲$1 billion
- Website: Official site

The Jessica Simpson Collection is a fashion line by American singer Jessica Simpson. The line sells clothing, accessories, shoes, perfume and luggage. The brand initially launched in 2005 as a shoe collaboration with Nine West co-founder Vince Camuto. Due to the success that followed, Simpson began adding on, which resulted in the brand's current 22 different licenses.

The collection earned $750 million in 2010, making it the top selling celebrity clothing empire. Simpson told New York magazine in February 2011, the reason her brand is so successful is because "When it comes to other celebrity brands, I think a lot of people do a great job, but it can't be all about them. Everybody doesn't want to just look like the celebrity, because they can't. They just want one element of that style." In 2015, the brand reached total sales of $1 billion. In 2020, the brand had estimated sales of $500 million for the year.

On August 31, 2021, Jessica Simpson's parent company, Sequential Brands, filed for Chapter 11 bankruptcy protection.

In April 2024, the Jessica Simpson Collection collaborated exclusively with Walmart, with the brand being available in 800 stores.

As of December 2024, the collection is available in retail stores, Buy Buy Baby, Dillard's, Kid Box, Nordstrom Rack, Amazon, Macy's, Wayfair, Destination Maternity and Motherhood Maternity.
