= The Price of Beauty =

- Genre: Reality
- Directed by: Tony Croll
- Starring: Jessica Simpson; Cacee Cobb; Ken Paves
- Narrated by: Jessica Simpson
- Opening theme: "Who We Are" by Jessica Simpson
- Country of origin: United States
- Original language: English
- No. of seasons: 1
- No. of episodes: 8

Production
- Executive producers: Joe Simpson; Jessica Simpson
- Running time: 24 minutes
- Production company: RDF USA

Original release
- Network: VH1
- Release: March 15 – May 3, 2010

Jessica Simpson's The Price of Beauty is an American documentary reality television series that followed singer Jessica Simpson and her two best friends Ken Pavés and CaCee Cobb as they traveled worldwide "to meet women, study local fashions, dietary fads, and beauty regimes," in an attempt to explore the meaning of true beauty in different cultures. It was Simpson's return to reality television since six years earlier on MTV's Newlyweds: Nick & Jessica. Simpson sang the official theme song, "Who We Are".

== Episodes ==
Simpson and her friends traveled around the world in search of cultural beauty. Each episode focused on a different country, ending with Simpson bringing members of each episode back to L.A for the final episode. In the series finale, Simpson gave Panya, a woman from Thailand with a skin condition, a makeover to make her more confident within herself.

No.	Title	Original release date
1	"Thailand"	March 15, 2010
2	"France"	March 22, 2010
3	"India"	March 29, 2010
4	"Uganda"	April 5, 2010
5	"Morocco"	April 12, 2010
6	"Japan"	April 19, 2010
7	"Brazil"	April 26, 2010
8	"Los Angeles"	May 3, 2010
