= ReJoyce: The Christmas Album =

2004 Christmas album by singer Jessica Simpson

Studio album by Jessica Simpson
- Released: November 23, 2004
- Recorded: 2004
- Studio: Headman Recording (New York City); House of Blues Studios (Los Angeles, California); Pyramid Studios (New York City); The Studio (Philadelphia, Pennsylvania); Turtle Sound Studios (New York City)
- Genre: Christmas
- Length: 38:53
- Label: Columbia
- Producer: Billy Mann; Chris Rojas

Jessica Simpson chronology
In This Skin (2003)	ReJoyce: The Christmas Album (2004)	A Public Affair (2006)

Singles from ReJoyce: The Christmas Album
- 1. "Baby, It's Cold Outside" Released: November 22, 2004; 2. "Let It Snow! Let It Snow! Let It Snow!" Released: November 22, 2004; 3. "O Holy Night" Released: November 22, 2004; 4. "What Christmas Means to Me" Released: November 22, 2004

ReJoyce: The Christmas Album is the fourth studio album and first Christmas album by American pop singer Jessica Simpson. It was released by Columbia Records on November 23, 2004. The album features cover versions of popular Christmas songs and includes a duet with her sister, Ashlee Simpson, on the song "Little Drummer Boy". Additionally, it also includes a duet with Nick Lachey, Simpson's husband at the time, on "Baby, It's Cold Outside". The cover of Amy Grant's "Breath of Heaven (Mary's Song)" was notable, as Simpson has said that Amy Grant is one of her favorite recording artists and her role model. "O Holy Night" had an accompanying music video.

ReJoyce: The Christmas Album was released after Simpson's most successful studio album of her career In This Skin (2003). The album has sold 669,000 copies in the United States, as of February 23, 2009, according to Nielsen SoundScan, and has been certified Gold by the Recording Industry Association of America in January 2005.

== Critical reception ==
Professional ratings
Review scores
Source	Rating
Allmusic	3/5 stars
Entertainment Weekly	D+

The album garnered a positive review from Stephen Thomas Erlewin of AllMusic, who said: the album was "filled with showstoppers and grandstanding, relying on the tried-and-true seasonal classics while offering a couple of new songs almost as an afterthought. It's bright and incessantly cheerful, always seeming loud even during its quietest moments because the music itself is bold and brassy.".

== Commercial performance ==
The album debuted at number sixteen on the Billboard 200 with 152,000 copies. After a week the album peaked at number fourteen on the Billboard 200. As of February 23, 2009, the album has sold a total of 669,000 copies in the United States and has been certified Gold by the Recording Industry Association of America (RIAA).

== Track listing ==
- All tracks were produced by Billy Mann, except for "Breath of Heaven (Mary's Song)" which was produced by Mann and Chris Rojas.

No.	Title	Writer(s)	Length
1.	"Let It Snow, Let It Snow, Let It Snow"	Sammy Cahn; Jule Styne	2:01
2.	"The Christmas Song (Chestnuts Roasting on an Open Fire)"	Mel Tormé; Bob Wells	4:02
3.	"Baby, It's Cold Outside" (duet with Nick Lachey)	Frank Loesser	2:47
4.	"O Holy Night"	Adolphe Adam	4:10
5.	"The Little Drummer Boy" (duet with Ashlee Simpson)	Katherine Davis; Henry Onorati; Harry Simeone	3:39
6.	"I Saw Mommy Kissing Santa Claus"	Tommie Connor	3:07
7.	"What Child Is This"	Traditional	3:55
8.	"What Christmas Means to Me"	George Gordy; Allen Story; Anna Gordy Gaye	3:00
9.	"Breath of Heaven (Mary's Song)"	Chris Eaton; Amy Grant	5:38
10.	"It's Christmas Time Again"	Mann; Lachey; Rojas; Jessica Simpson	3:12
11.	"Hark! The Herald Angels Sing" (featuring Tye Tribbett and GA)	Felix Mendelssohn	3:12
Total length:			38:53

2020 digital deluxe edition bonus track
No.	Title	Writer(s)	Length
12.	"Angels" (acoustic)	Robbie Williams; Guy Chambers	4:07
Total length:			43:00

== A Special Limited Edition Christmas Collection ==
A Special Limited Edition Christmas Collection

EP by Jessica Simpson
- Released: September 14, 2004
- Recorded: 2004
- Genre: Pop; holiday
- Length: 25:53
- Label: Columbia
- Producer: Billy Mann

Simpson's first extended play (EP), titled A Special Limited Edition Christmas Collection, was sold at participating 7-Eleven stores in the U.S. and Canada. It included an exclusive acoustic version of Jessica's version of "Angels."

=== Track listing ===
No.	Title	Writer(s)	Length
1.	"Let It Snow, Let It Snow, Let It Snow"	Sammy Cahn; Jule Styne	2:01
2.	"The Little Drummer Boy" (duet with Ashlee Simpson)	Katherine Davis; Henry Onorati; Harry Simeone	3:39
3.	"O Holy Night"	Adolphe Adam	4:10
4.	"What Christmas Means to Me"	George Gordy; Allen Story; Anna Gordy Gaye	3:00
5.	"Breath of Heaven (Mary's Song)"	Chris Eaton; Amy Grant	5:38
6.	"Hark! The Herald Angels Sing"	Felix Mendelssohn	3:12
7.	"Angels" (Acoustic version)	Guy Chambers; Robbie Williams	4:05
Total length:			25:53

== Charts ==
=== Weekly charts ===
Chart (2004–2012)	Peak position
US Billboard 200	14
US Top Catalog Albums (Billboard)	30
US Top Holiday Albums (Billboard)	2

=== Year-end charts ===
Chart (2005)	Position
US Billboard 200	128

=== Singles ===
Year	Single	Peak positions
Year	Single	US Billboard AC
2004	"Let It Snow, Let It Snow, Let It Snow"	20
2004	"What Christmas Means to Me"	8

== Certifications ==
Region	Certification	Certified units/sales
United States (RIAA)	Gold	669,000
