= Ken Pavés =

American hairdresser

Ken Pavés is an American hairdresser. He has worked as hair stylist for many celebrities including Jennifer Lopez and Carmen Electra. As an entrepreneur he has collaborated with Jessica Simpson and Karen Marie Shelton, and markets his own line of hair products. He is a spokesperson for the Operation Smile charity.

== Early life ==
Ken Pavés was born in the Detroit suburb of New Baltimore, Michigan as the youngest of three children of Helen Paves, who is of Portuguese and Filipino descent, and Gary Paves, who is of Romanian Jewish descent. Pavés credits his mother Helen for his entry into the world of hair and fashion, saying that when she dressed up "she turned almost into a superhero." He graduated in 1994 from a cosmetology school in St. Clair Shores, Michigan.

== Career ==
After school, Pavés became assistant to star stylist Oribe in Miami — a job that paid US$75 a week. He would moonlight doing strippers' hair until 4 A.M. When these clients showed up in Oribe's shop during regular business hours, Oribe learned that Pavés could do "big, beautiful hair."

Pavés studied hair design at Vidal Sassoon Academy and Toni & Guy Institute. He traveled with other celebrity hair stylists during tours of Europe where Pavés created hairstyles in conjunction with couture collections for Versace, Valentino and others. However, he met his most regular client, Jessica Simpson, in 1998 when she hired him as the stylist for her imminent album cover.

In 2002, Pavés met Hairboutique.com founder Karen Marie Shelton at a Seventeen magazine shoot in Dallas, Texas for Jessica Simpson. Pavés and Shelton formed an ongoing collaboration where his celebrity hair advice was initially featured (with exclusive celebrity hair tips) on the Internet through the Hairboutique.com website. Also beginning in 2002, Pavés appeared regularly on The Oprah Winfrey Show creating a series of hair make-overs for Oprah Winfrey audiences. Pavés has appeared on several episodes of MTV's reality show Newlyweds: Nick and Jessica starring Jessica Simpson and Nick Lachey in addition to his appearances on MTV, VH-1 and similar entertainment shows, providing hair care tips.

In 2004, Pavés launched Flawless by Pavés Professional which was originally sold in Walgreens and on Hairboutique.com. In 2006 he launched the 'Hairdo' line of clip-on hair extensions that he created in partnership with Jessica Simpson and the HairUWear company. Simpson and Paves appear in the promotional video Simpson & Ken Paves: Behind the Scenes.

Pavés has worked with celebrities such as Eva Longoria, Carmen Electra, Céline Dion, Kim Cattrall, Ashlee Simpson, Christina Applegate, Heather Locklear, Avril Lavigne, Brittany Murphy, Jennifer Lopez, Lindsay Lohan, and Jessica Biel along with others since the mid-1990s. His hair designs have appeared in beauty, fashion and hair publications including Vogue, Elle, InStyle, Marie Claire, Cosmopolitan, Seventeen, US Weekly, Celebrity Living, Life & Style Weekly and Star.

Pavés is currently working for the HAIRuWEAR company, which markets "alternative hair" accessories, extensions and systems, and wigs for cancer patients. He is also associated with the ElevenSpa Vegas development in Las Vegas. He has featured in television commercials for hair products.

== Charity ==
Pavés is a spokesperson for Operation Smile Charity and has accompanied Jessica Simpson on international trips on behalf of the charity. Jessica Simpson has served as International Youth Ambassador of Operation Smile since 2003 when Pavés introduced her to the organization.

== Filmography ==
- Jessica Simpson: A Public Affair (2006) (TV) - himself
- Monster-in-Law (2005) (a.k.a. Das Schwiegermonster (Germany)) - hair stylist to Jennifer Lopez, additional photography
- Jersey Girl (2004) - hair stylist to Jennifer Lopez
- You Don't Know Jack... About MonsterFest (2001) (TV) - hair stylist and makeup artist to Carmen Elektra
- The Wedding Planner (2001) - hair stylist to Jennifer Lopez)
