= The Real L Word =

American reality television series

- Official promotional poster for Season Three
- Genre: Reality; Drama series
- Created by: Ilene Chaiken
- Opening theme: "Hazy" as performed by Love Darling
- Country of origin: United States
- Original language: English
- No. of seasons: 3
- No. of episodes: 27

Production
- Producer: Ilene Chaiken
- Production locations: Los Angeles, California (2010-); Brooklyn, New York (2012-)
- Running time: 54–58 minutes
- Production companies: Little Chicken, Inc. Magical Elves Productions; Showtime Networks

Original release
- Network: Showtime
- Release: June 20, 2010 – September 6, 2012

Related
- The L Word

The Real L Word is an American reality television series aired on the cable channel Showtime, where it premiered on June 20, 2010. The show was created by executive producer Ilene Chaiken and Magical Elves Productions, following the success of the television drama The L Word also created by Chaiken. The Real L Word follows a group of lesbians in their daily lives in Los Angeles, and as of the third season, Brooklyn.

With seasons 1 and 2 being successful, Showtime commissioned a third and final season, which premiered on July 12, 2012.

== Cast ==
Cast	Seasons		
Cast	1	2	3
	Main Cast		
Whitney Mixter	Main	Main	Main
Rose Garcia	Main	Guest	Guest
Jill Sloane Goldstein	Main		
Mikey Koffman	Main		
Tracy Ryerson	Main		
Nikki Weiss	Main		
Kacy Boccumini		Main	Main
Romi Klinger	Recurring	Main	Main
Cori McGinn-Boccumini		Main	Main
Francine Beppu		Main	
Sajdah Golde		Main	
Claire Moseley		Main	
Sara Bettencourt	Recurring	Recurring	Main
Lauren Bedford Russell			Main
Somer Bingham			Main
Amanda Leigh Dunn			Main
Kiyomi McCloskey			Main
	Recurring Cast		
Alyssa Morgan	Recurring	Recurring	Recurring
Raquel Castaneda	Recurring		
Victoria "Tor" Dianna	Recurring		
Scarlett Hernandez	Recurring	Guest	Guest
Natalie Hornedo	Recurring		
Stamie Karakasidis	Recurring		
Chanel Brown		Recurring	
Kelsey Chavarria		Recurring	Recurring
Vivian Magnana		Recurring	
Rachel Rodriguez		Recurring	Guest
Laura Petracca			Recurring
Donna Rizham			Recurring
Veronica "Vero" Sanchez			Recurring

== Episodes ==
=== Season 1 (2010) ===
No.	Title	Original release date
1	"The Power of the Clam"	June 20, 2010
Whitney welcomes one-time flame Sada to town and the girls waste no time getting reacquainted, but their hot weekend together ends all too quickly and just as Whitney says goodbye to her, another former flame arrives in town indefinitely and did we mention flame number three, Romi? After a wild night out with friends, Rose dutifully returns home to Natalie, her girlfriend of seven months. Monogamy still doesn't come easy for this "reformed player" and the pressure her family dishes out to settle down doesn't help. For Nikki and Jill, wedding bells are already in the air, but wedding planning with two brides can be stressful! The ladies enlist the help of a wedding planner to produce their elegant affair, but just as Nikki's nerves begin to subside, Jill's anxiety skyrockets when she sees the price tag attached to their dream nuptials. As producer of LA Fashion Weekend, Mikey is no stranger to stress. She's on a tight schedule, doesn't have time for ill-prepared models and lets their agency feel her wrath. Tracy is new to the lesbian scene and finally coming into her own, but her mother's "don't ask, don't tell" policy is difficult for her, especially since there's so much to talk about, like her new relationship with Stamie, which has its own complications.
2	"Game On!"	June 27, 2010
Tracy spends the weekend at her girlfriend Stamie's house and strains to keep up with Stamie's three little ones. Is she ready for the responsibility of full-time parenting? Mikey has charged herself with producing the best Fashion Weekend LA has ever seen. After finding the perfect location for her client, she races off to receive an award from the Chamber of Commerce. She can't wait to share her big night with Raquel, but she's nowhere to be found and devastating news about the venue further riles Mikey. Whitney is overwhelmed, both with Tor moving in and her complicated feelings for Sada. At a bar, she again runs into recent hookup, Romi - and this time their exchange ends in a kiss. Will Whitney be able to juggle all of these relationships? Nikki and Jill are hoping to turn a book about 'sexual fluidity' into a documentary, a topic close to Jill. It comes into greater focus when her best friend Derek pays a visit and it's revealed how close the two came to dating. Rose and Natalie celebrate seven months together with a romantic dinner followed by a steamy nightcap at home. Later, Rose's father encourages Rose to reconcile with her estranged mother - their feud is tearing the family apart. With pressure from Natalie and her family mounting, Rose cuts loose at a debaucherous game night with friends but it quickly turns into a major blowout.
3	"Bromance"	July 4, 2010
It's Valentine's Day! Rose takes Natalie on a romantic getaway, where Natalie surprises Rose over dessert with sexy pin-up photos she's had taken of herself. Sufficiently wined and dined, the ladies continue celebrating back in their hotel room. Jill enlists her best friend Derek's help in picking out the perfect Valentine's Day gift for Nikki. Nikki treats Jill to private dance lessons to gear up for their first dance as wife and wife. Tracy is craving alone time with Stamie, but the kids come first. The pair finally reconnect after lunch with the whole brood. Stamie later surprises Tracy with a key to her house. Whitney throws herself into her work on an indie film. Accustomed to operating behind the camera as a special effects artist, she's surprised but totally game when the producer calls to offer her a leading role in the movie. To get in shape for the part, Whitney hires a gorgeous, kick-ass trainer who threatens to derail all of her good-girl plans. Later Romi lures her back into bed for some Valentine's fun. Mikey is hurt when Raquel has to work all weekend. So she decides to focus on giving her aunt, a recent cancer survivor, a surprise makeover at a swanky salon where, to her surprise, Romi is a make-up artist. Later, Mikey, Romi and Whitney hit the town for drinks. But Mikey heads home alone to an empty house.
4	"Gambling With Love"	July 11, 2010
Mikey hits the road to Las Vegas for a fashion tradeshow and checks into a pimped out penthouse suite. When Raquel calls to say she's catching the next flight to Sin City, Mikey gives her assistants an unexpected new task - booking a wedding chapel. Now, if only Raquel can make her flight... Stung by Alyssa's reprimands, Whitney comes clean to Tor about her romantic entanglements. Tor is hurt but tags along with Whitney on a night out at the bar - only to face Whitney's girl drama head on when both Romi and Whitney's trainer crush, Miranda, show up at the club too. Nikki and Jill love the sketches their wedding dress designers present, but aren't so thrilled by the price tag on the custom-made gowns. Overwhelmed by the ballooning budget, Jill goes against Nikki's wishes and tries to bargain with their wedding planner to cut costs. Natalie's job search leads her to Rose, who offers her an assistant gig. The idea of working together might give her pause, but Rose is drowning in office work and pressures Natalie to help. Tracy ponders a career change after a modeling agent scouts her at Stamie's comedy show. Indeed, her job as a Hollywood studio exec is exhausting and Tracy confesses to Stamie that she's at a crossroads - maybe a new gig in front of the camera is just what she needs.
5	"Free Pass"	July 18, 2010
Having landed in hot water with her LA lovers, Whitney can't wait to hit up San Francisco and rekindle her flame with Sada. After a blowout party, the two return to Whitney's hotel room for a sexy swim and shower. But when Sada talks about her proclivity for unattached sex, a rarely insecure Whitney fears their romance may be one-sided. Natalie's anxiety about quitting her job boils over into a screaming match with Rose at a family engagement. Rose's anger at Natalie for fighting in front of her father leads her to plan a hot night out with friends... and strippers. Nikki and Jill come to a happy agreement with their wedding planner on costs, but Nikki is upset to learn that custom-made dresses will break their budget. She finds the perfect dress in-store and buys it on the spot, while Jill's indecisiveness leaves her without a dress for the big day. Out of options, Mikey commits to tenting an outdoor space at Sunset Gower Studios for Fashion Weekend. It's a fix, but not a cheap one, and it leaves Mikey and her team scrambling to find the extra dollars. She has a new, big-name designer on the line that could put her company back in the black. Can she close the deal in time? Tracy continues to grapple with her mom's refusal to talk about her sexuality or her relationship with Stamie. There's a lot Tracy wishes she could share with her mom, like her new modeling career, especially her first gig in a national lesbian magazine! Look out world - Tracy's coming out, with or without her mom's blessing.
6	"Family Ties"	July 25, 2010
Her stripper night having gone undiscovered, Rose enjoys brunch with friends while Natalie hits up the spa with her sister, Leslie. Later, Rose meets Natalie's mom for the first time over dinner and they hit it off, but good spirits are marred by news from Natalie that her mom is sick. Tracy reconnects with her sister Amy over lunch and learns that their mom has been pumping Amy for info on Stamie. Tracy's happy that her mom is showing interest but wishes they could speak directly. Her patience is wearing thin - especially with Amy seeming to take her mom's side. Nikki and Jill scout wedding locations in Malibu and Nikki falls in love with the first home they tour. She's ready to sign and spare no expense but Jill wants to explore other options - and keep their growing budget in mind. Ah, the art of negotiation with two brides to be... In relationship limbo with Sada, Whitney goes out with Tor and suddenly finds herself the jealous one when rumors start to fly that Tor is hooking up with Scarlett. Whitney calls Tor out on the suspected dalliances; one minute they're fighting and the next they're... Mikey arrives in New York to host a press event for her Fashion Weekend clients. She's excited to build buzz for her designers but when the editors fail to show, Mikey drowns her anxiety in champagne at a raging club. The editors show on day two - but will Mikey make it out of bed?
7	"It's My Party and I'll Cry If I Want To"	August 1, 2010
With Fashion Weekend just one week away and her to-do list a mile long, Mikey's nerves are maxed out. She flips out on her staff and tries to decompress over dinner with Raquel. It's a rare evening together for the couple and a chance to reconnect - but Mikey's head is back at the office. Nikki and Jill are hosting their first Passover Seder as a couple and call in their favorite interior decorator to consult on a new dining room table. However, a new table quickly becomes new paint, new curtains, new everything - until the renovations come to a crashing halt. Whitney takes out her sexual tension with Tor in a high-stakes game of paintball - winner tops all. But the next day, Whitney hosts the house party to end all house parties - and possibly her relationship with Tor - when Romi shows up to stake her claim. Rose is dealt a blow when the rock of her world - her grandmother - is rushed to the hospital. Is the emotional roller coaster that unfolds enough to send Rose running back into the arms of her ex-girlfriend? Tracy consults a psychic and gains some shocking insight into her past. She calls her mom to share the details of her reading - and to invite her out to LA for her 30th birthday. Is Tracy's mom finally ready to share in her daughter's life as Tracy so desperately wants?
8	"Runway Bride"	August 8, 2010
After ditching Natalie at the club, Rose plans a secret rendezvous with her ex-girlfriend. And we're in for another surprise reunion when Rose's mother comes back into the picture after months of estrangement from her daughter. Whitney wakes up to the aftermath of her debaucherous white trash party. Tor and Alyssa are pissed - and Scarlett encourages her to end things with Romi... especially since Sada is moving to LA in a matter of days. Nikki finally convinces Jill to book the first Malibu house they saw as their wedding venue. One step closer to the big day, Nikki and Jill head out to work on Nikki's Valentine's Day - dance lessons. Tracy celebrates her 30th birthday and gets the best present of all - a surprise visit from her mom. But is she really ready to immerse herself in Tracy's whole life with Stamie and the kids? Fashion Weekend has arrived! Mikey weathers last minute production snafus to put on an amazing, star-studded weekend of runway shows. And that's not all - this producer extraordinaire has another trick up her sleeve - and all of our ladies are in the front row to watch.
9	"Dinah or Bust"	August 15, 2010
Sada moves to LA just in time to join Whitney for a weekend of partying at the annual Dinah Shore gathering in Palm Springs. The ladies waste little time getting reacquainted and Whitney can't help but think it's the start of something good. That is until Romi joins the party and deals Whitney the shocker of the season. Rose and Natalie are Dinah-bound as well and Natalie worries about what might transpire amidst all the ladies. Rose sticks by her girl's side on the first night but the next day's pool party quickly unravels into a blowout fight. Can this passionate duo survive The Dinah or will Rose's player ways return in Palm Springs? Mikey goes all out on a birthday present for Raquel and then the couple packs up to meet the ladies in Palm Springs. It's Raquel's first Dinah and she's excited to see what she's been missing... now if only she and Mikey could make it out of their hotel suite to join the party. Back in LA, Nikki and Jill's wedding is just around the corner but Jill is still unsure about a dress. Good thing Nikki has a big surprise in store to help her fiance find the perfect gown for the big day. Tracy's mom is still in town and the visit is going well, but Tracy is tired of walking on eggshells and Stamie wants her girl back. With everyone gathered for her 30th birthday party, Tracy finally takes a stand and challenges her mom to accept her life with Stamie and the kids - PDAs included.

=== Season 2 (2011) ===
No.	Title	Original release date
10	"Fresh Start"	June 5, 2011
In the Season 2 premiere, Whitney's girl drama deepens when her ex-lover Rachel moves to Los Angeles; Claire nervously contemplates a similar cross-country relocation and a reunion with Francine, a model and media magnate who has offered a guest bedroom; Romi and Kelsey drunkenly celebrate a birthday; Cori and Kacy want a baby and have a sperm donor lined up, but they're clueless about the rest of the process; the newly out Sajdah seeks her first lesbian relationship and finds a potential partner online.
11	"The Morning After"	June 12, 2011
Romi and Kelsey's lack of a sex life leads to another drunken confrontation; Whitney wakes up in Sada's bed once more, unable to deny her attraction; Claire and Francine try to regroup; Kacy and Cori have dinner with more male friends who could be potential sperm donors but encounter more reluctance than they expected; Sajdah is thrilled to tell her friend Marissa about her new romance with Chanel but Marissa warns her to proceed with caution.
12	"Back to Square One"	June 19, 2011
Whitney heads north to San Francisco but fails to leave her girl troubles behind; Romi faces the challenge of her new sobriety while still wrestling with her and Kelsey's sexual issues; Sajdah's relationship with Chanel proceeds rapidly; Kacy and Cori find a sperm donor online; Francine counts the days until Claire moves out - and so does Claire, who is eager to leave.
13	"The Other L Word"	June 26, 2011
A night out with Kacy and Cori proves to Whitney and Sada how deeply dysfunctional they are; Sajdah's birthday bash for Chanel takes a heartbreaking turn; invigorated by sobriety, Romi refocuses on her career; Claire gets her own place.
14	"It's About To Get Juicy"	July 3, 2011
Whitney is ready to get over Sada but her ex is scheduled to go-go dance at an event she's planning; Kacy and Cori go to their first meeting with the doctor performing their procedure; Romi reexamines her relationship with Kelsey, who can't stay sober; Saj and Chanel are back on but their sex life is temporarily on hold; Claire and Francine aren't speaking but can't avoid each other during a night out at the club.
15	"Baby Batter Up"	July 10, 2011
Cori and Kacy deal with Cori’s inability to get pregnant and Whitney and Alyssa use their special skills to lend the couple a hand with the insemination. Meanwhile, Romi heads to Las Vegas for her first day on the new fashion job and persuades her boss to hire Rachel to help at the convention; Saj engages Chanel with a surprise day of whirlwind romance; and Claire arrives home to find her belongings dumped on Francine’s porch.
16	"Playing with Fire"	July 17, 2011
Kacy prays for some divine intervention in her and Cori's efforts to get pregnant. Meanwhile, Chanel wants Saj to downplay her too frequent public displays of affection; Romi meets a major designer who shows an interest in marketing her jewelry line; Claire is most welcoming when Vivian arrives in Los Angeles, but it isn’t long before she resorts to her bossy old self; and a nervous Rachel awaits word on her job with Vidal Sassoon.
17	"The Hardest Time"	July 24, 2011
Kacy’s friend, a lesbian mother, offers her some daunting advice about the insemination process. Elsewhere, Whitney plans a lesbian field-day charity event; Sajdah’s breakup with Chanel has her in the dumps, but she perks up after learning her mother is coming to town; Kelsey admits to Romi that she’s been drinking and that sets off a battle; and Franny tells friends she’s ready to come out to her traditional Japanese family.
18	"The Pieces Fall into Place"	August 7, 2011
Whitney and Romi grapple with their feelings for each other; Kacy and Cori pursue what may be their last chance at making a baby; after her mother leaves, Sajdah realizes she did indeed move too fast with Chanel; Francine welcomes her mother to town and braces for coming out.

=== Season 3 (2012) ===
No.	Title	Original release date
19	"Apples and Oranges"	July 12, 2012
In the Season 3 premiere, the ladies go bi-coastal as cameras capture their escapades in Los Angeles and Brooklyn.
20	"Leap of Faith"	July 19, 2012
Romi expresses a maternal urge to her boyfriend Jay; Whitney considers having a spiritual-healing party with Sara and friends.
21	"Love Lost"	July 26, 2012
Romi opines about her one-sided relationship with her male friend Jay; Whitney surprises her mother with the announcement of her engagement to Sara.
22	"Scissor Sisters"	August 2, 2012
Whitney was disappointed by her mother's reaction to her engagement, but now her nerves are going wild as they head up to San Jose to break the news to Sara's very traditional Portuguese family. Now Romi isn't getting the love and attention she needs from Jay, and with Kelsey back in her life, it's a quick and easy fix. It has been a rocky road to recovery for Cori and Kacy as they grieve over the loss of Charlie. As part of their healing process, they gather the courage to leave the house for the first time to pay an emotional visit to the nurses who helped them through the roughest of times. Hunter Valentine's tour comes to an end and they return to the Big Apple. Kiyomi works her swagger while Laura pulls a few shocking stunts as they both vie for Lauren's attention.
23	"I Wasn't Expecting This"	August 9, 2012
The women prep for the annual Palm Springs party to end all parties, with Romi and Kelsey arriving as a sober couple and Amanda dropping a bombshell on Lauren. Meanwhile, Hunter Valentine head to the West Coast; and Somer and Donna miss their flight.
24	"Lost in a Bush"	August 16, 2012
At the Dinah Shore weekend gig, Whitney and Sara entertain a third party; Cori and Kacy feel overwhelmed; Amanda's single-girls getaway gets out of hand when her friend hooks up with a rock star. Later, Romi has an uncomfortable encounter with former friends.
25	"Dream Come True"	August 23, 2012
Whitney goes to Connecticut for a coming-out chat with her grandmother; Kiyomi and Lauren deal with being separated after the Dinah weekend.
26	"Premonitions"	August 30, 2012
The pressure of the impending wedding ceremony is starting to get to Whitney, but Sara is content to just go with the flow; Lauren flies to New York to explore a relationship with Kiyomi; and Romi shoots a music video.
27	"Perfect Day"	September 6, 2012
It's Sara and Whitney's wedding day!
