= J. J. Pearce High School =

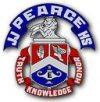

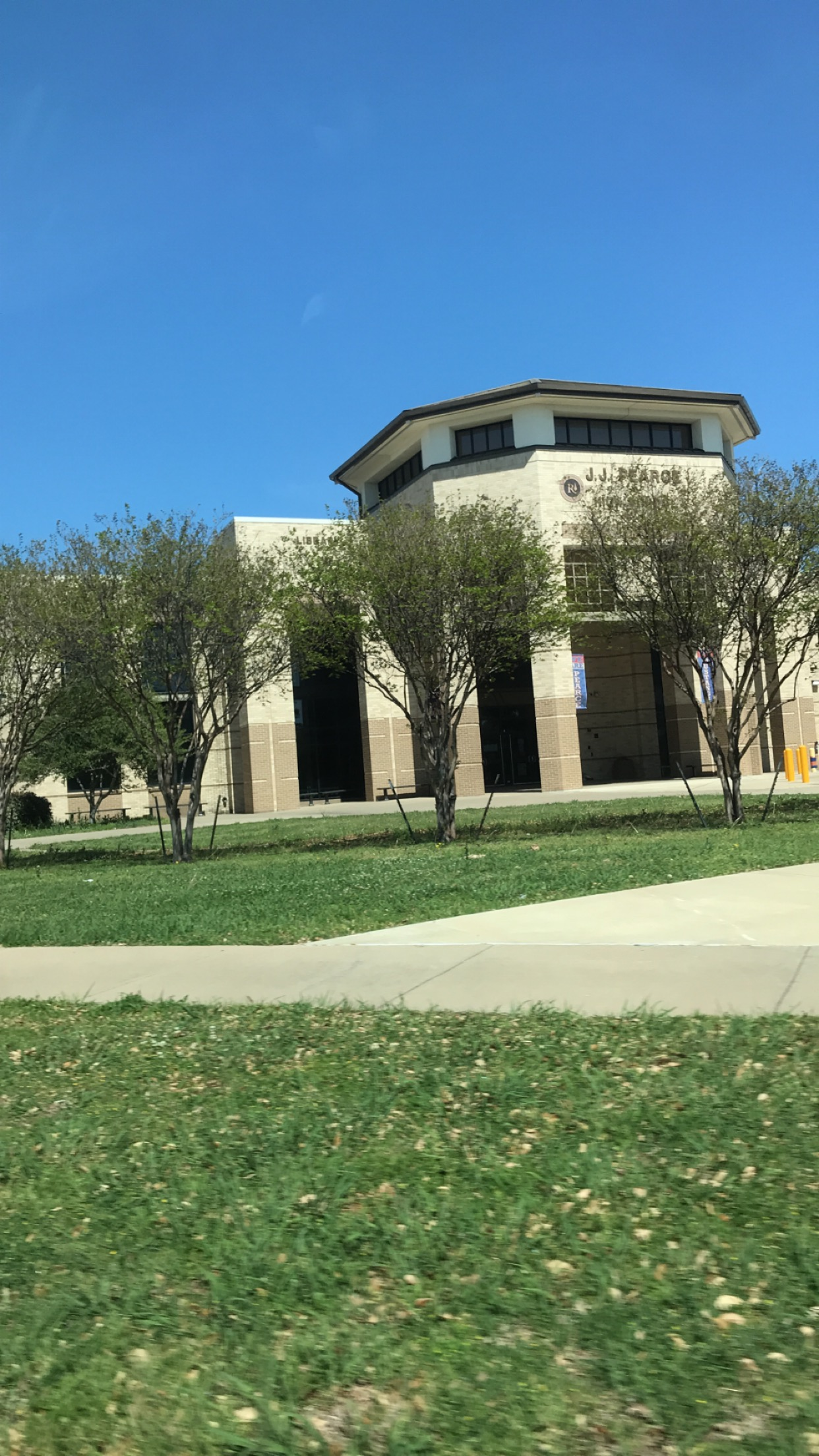

Location
- 1600 North Coit Road; Richardson, Dallas County, Texas 75080; United States; 32.972559°N 96.766106°W

Information
- Type: High school/secondary school
- Established: 1967
- School district: Richardson Independent School District
- Principal: Carrie Breedlove
- Teaching staff: 161.23 (FTE)
- Grades: 9–12
- Enrollment: 2,453 (2023–2024)
- Student to teacher ratio: 15.21
- Colors: Royal blue and red
- Mascot: Mustang
- Website: Official website

J. J. Pearce High School is a high school located in Richardson, Texas, United States. It serves students in grade 9–12 and is one of four high schools in the Richardson Independent School District (RISD). The school is named after Joseph Jones "J.J." Pearce, the RISD superintendent from 1946 to 1977.

== History ==
Pearce was established in 1967 with a group of tenth graders housed at Richardson North Junior High School. Prior to 1967, all high school students in the Pearce area attended Richardson High School. In 1969, the school moved to its current home on Coit Road; the campus has been expanded several times since. Along with Berkner High School, it is one of two RISD high schools to have a natatorium. Eagle-Mustang Stadium is shared with Richardson High School. An indoor training facility was built in 2018 to accommodate Pearce athletes.

The graduating class of 1987 was reunited on the TV Land original program High School Reunion, which premiered on March 5, 2008.

Pearce was named a National Blue Ribbon School for the 1988–1989 school year.

In September 2017, two Pearce students were accused of creating racist memes during the week leading up to the school's annual in-town rivalry football game against Richardson High School. The most controversial meme depicted the Pearce High School logo over KKK members and the Richardson High School logo over a burning cross. Each student served an out of school suspension.

In 2021, voters in Richardson ISD approved a $750 million dollar bond package, with a substantial amount dedicated to Pearce campus renovations. The renovations were expected to be completed by August 2024.

== Academics ==
Newsweek ranked Pearce at #528 in the top 1,000 high schools in the nation. Schools were ranked based on the number of students who took Advanced Placement courses and AP tests.

In 2009, the state classified 81% of Pearce's graduates as "college ready", or ready to undergo university studies. The state of Texas defined "college readiness" by scores on the ACT and SAT, and in the 11th grade Texas Assessment of Knowledge and Skills (TAKS) tests. During the same year, the school's student body had 22% poor students, and 27% of its students had a risk of dropping out. Holly K. Hacker of The Dallas Morning News said that the readiness rate was about 20 points higher than statistics would predict, and that the school "far exceeds what is expected."

J. J. Pearce High School was a recognized school in 2007–2008 as well.

== Theater ==
Lynn Shaw directed Pearce's theater program for 25 years until her death in 2009. Now directed by Heather Biddle, the program has received numerous nominations, awards, and recognitions both in the Dallas–Fort Worth Metroplex and across the country. Additionally, the program has been chosen to premiere multiple high school adaptations of Broadway musicals. On September 15, 2016, the school hosted the world premiere of the high school edition of Heathers: The Musical. On October 23 of 2022, J. J. Pearce piloted the high school version of Mean Girls: The Musical. In June 2023, the same cast performed the show at the International Thespian Festival in Bloomington, Indiana.

== Notable alumni ==
- Jeff Agoos (b. 1968), National Soccer Hall of Fame and former World Cup soccer player
- Shane Carruth (b. 1972), filmmaker responsible for Primer and Upstream Color
- Ray Childress (b. 1962), class of 1981, NFL Pro Bowl defensive lineman
- Corey Coleman (b. 1994), New York Giants wide receiver, 2015 Fred Biletnikoff Award winner
- Julie Cypher (b. 1964), class of 1982, motion picture director, ex-wife of actor Lou Diamond Phillips, and ex-partner of singer Melissa Etheridge
- Anthony Dorsett (b. 1973), class of 1992, former defensive back for the Tennessee Titans and Oakland Raiders; son of Tony Dorsett, a Hall of Fame running back for the Dallas Cowboys and Denver Broncos
- Sam Eckholm, class of 2014, Air Force veteran, creator, and host of the YouTube series Access Granted
- Asaf Epstein (b. 1978), class of 1996, film director, writer, and producer
- Lane Garrison (b. 1980), class of 1998, actor on Prison Break
- Chris Jacke (b. 1966), class of 1984, NFL kicker
- Bavand Karim (b. 1979), class of 1996, film and TV producer
- Jaren Lewison (b. 2000), class of 2019, actor on Netflix series Never Have I Ever
- Liam McNeeley (b. 2005), NBA player
- Alejandro Moreno (b. 1979), professional soccer player who won three MLS Cups with three different teams, while being capped 41 times at the international level with Venezuela
- Bryn Neuenschwander (b. 1980), class of 1998, fantasy author
- Philece Sampler (b. 1953) class of 1971, Soap opera actress, Days of Our Lives and Another World.
- Kin Shriner (b. 1953), class of 1972, actor best known for his run on soap operas including General Hospital
- Wil Shriner (b. 1953), class of 1972, television and movie actor
- Jessica Simpson (b. 1980), recording artist, actress, and businesswoman; left Pearce after her junior year in 1997
- Scott Turner (b. 1972), class of 1991, current United States Secretary of Housing and Urban Development and former NFL defensive back
- Drew Timme (b. 2000), class of 2019, NBA player
