= Jessica Simpson videography =

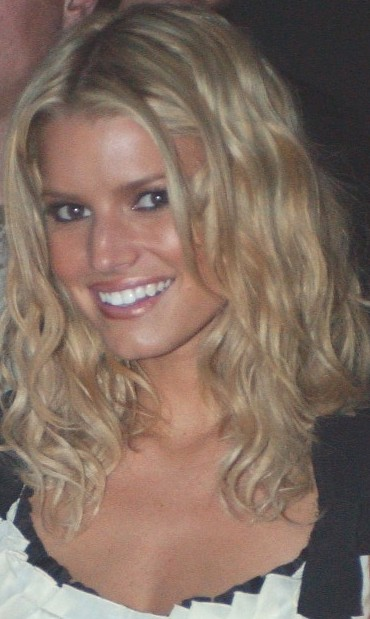
Simpson at the premiere for The Dukes of Hazzard in 2005

American singer Jessica Simpson has released three video albums and been featured in 18 music videos, 6 films, and 11 television programs.

== Music videos ==
Title	Year	Other performer(s)	Director(s)	Ref.
"I Wanna Love You Forever"	1999	—N/a	Bille Woodruff	
"Where You Are"	2000	Nick Lachey	Kevin Bray	
"I Think I'm in Love with You"	2000	—N/a	Nigel Dick	
"Irresistible"	2001	—N/a	Simon Brand	
"A Little Bit"	2001	—N/a	Hype Williams	
"Irresistible (So So Def Remix)"	2002	Lil' Bow Wow and Dupri	Cameron Casey	
"Love Me Tender"	2003		ABC	
"Sweetest Sin"	2003		Constantine Paraskevopoulos	
"With You"	2003		Elliott Lester	
"Take My Breath Away"	2004		Chris Applebaum	
"Angels"	2004	—N/a	Matthew Rolston	
"A Whole New World"	2004	Nick Lachey	Elliott Lester	
"Let It Snow! Let It Snow! Let It Snow!"	2004	—N/a	Jessica Simpson	
"O Holy Night"	2004	—N/a	Jessica Simpson	
"These Boots Are Made for Walkin'"	2005	—N/a	Brett Ratner	
"A Public Affair"	2006	—N/a	Brett Ratner	
"I Belong to Me"	2006	—N/a	Matthew Rolston	
"Come On Over"	2008	—N/a	Liz Friedlander	

== Video albums ==
List of albums
Title	Album details
Dream Chaser	Released: January 22, 2002; Label: Sony; Format: DVD, VHS
Sweetest Sin/With You	Released: November 25, 2003; Label: Sony; Format: DVD
Reality Tour Live	Released: November 23, 2004; Label: Sony; Format: DVD

== Filmography ==
=== Films ===
Year	Film	Role	Notes
2002	The Master of Disguise		Cameo appearance
2005	The Dukes of Hazzard	Daisy Duke	
2006	Employee of the Month	Amy	
2007	Blonde Ambition	Katie Gregerstitch	
2008	The Love Guru		Cameo
2008	Private Valentine: Blonde & Dangerous	Private Megan Valentine	

=== Television ===
Year	Title	Role	Notes
2002—2003	That '70s Show	Annette	TV series (3 episodes)
2003	The Twilight Zone	Miranda Evans	TV series (1 episode "The Collection")
2003—2005	Newlyweds: Nick and Jessica		TV series
2004	The Nick and Jessica Variety Hour		Music/Sketch Comedy Special
2004	Nick and Jessica's Family Christmas		Holiday Music Special
2004	Jessica	Jessica Sampson	TV series
2009	I Get That a Lot		TV series (1 episode)
2010	The Price of Beauty		TV series
2010	Entourage		TV series (1 episode "Bottoms Up")
2012—2013	Fashion Star		TV series
