= In This Skin =

2003 album by Jessica Simpson

- Original edition cover

Studio album by Jessica Simpson
- Released: August 19, 2003
- Recorded: 2002–2003
- Studio: Cove City Sound Studios (Glen Cove, NY); Sony Music Studios (New York, NY); Record Plant (Los Angeles, CA); Big Baby Studios (New York, NY); Henson Recording Studios (Los Angeles, CA); The Enterprise (Burbank, CA); 785 Studios (New York, NY); Planet Mars Studios (New York, NY); Studio 19 (Nashville, TN); Stella Studios (London, England); The Bennett House (Franklin, TN); Stonewall Sound (Malibu, CA); Chartmaker Studios (Los Angeles, CA); Sound on Sound Studios (New York, NY); Turtle Sound Studios (New York, NY); Steakhouse Recording (Los Angeles, CA)
- Genre: Pop
- Length: 41:57
- Label: Columbia
- Producer: Greg Barnhill; Billy Mann; Damon Elliott; Greg Fitzgerald; Rob Fusari; Franne Golde; Trina Harmon; Holly Lamar; Kasia Livingston; Andy Marvel; Keith Thomas; Ric Wake; Andrew Williams

Jessica Simpson chronology
This Is the Remix (2002)	In This Skin (2003)	ReJoyce: The Christmas Album (2004)

Alternative cover
- Reissue cover

Singles from In This Skin
- 1. "Sweetest Sin" Released: July 14, 2003; 2. "With You" Released: November 3, 2003

In This Skin is the third studio album by American recording artist Jessica Simpson. The album was released on August 19, 2003, by Columbia Records. It was reissued on March 2, 2004, with three new songs. Simpson began taking more creative control of her music with the album, both musically and lyrically, co-writing 10 out of 14 tracks on the album, thus moving away from the teen pop styles of her previous two albums, Sweet Kisses (1999) and Irresistible (2001), as well as including elements of Middle Eastern music, dance, acoustic, and pop rock, while also lyrically talking about more mature subject matters. The album was a huge success in North America, reaching number two on the US Billboard 200 and being certified triple platinum by the Recording Industry Association of America (RIAA). Internationally, In This Skin went on to become the thirty-fifth best selling album of 2004. It was ranked number 153 on the list of the top-selling albums of the 2000s by Billboard magazine. As of 2020, In This Skin has sold 7 million copies worldwide.

The album spawned four singles, including two top 20 hits worldwide, "With You" and "Take My Breath Away," which peaked at number fourteen and twenty on the Billboard Hot 100 respectively. "Sweetest Sin" and "Angels," the lead and final single, both failed to make an impact on charts. Simpson performed songs from In This Skin on a number of occasions. In middle 2004, she embarked on her second headlining tour, titled the Reality Tour, to promote the album.

== Background ==
After the release of her 2001 album Irresistible, Simpson stated she wanted to write songs for her third record. In an interview with MTV in October 2002, her then-husband, Nick Lachey, revealed that Simpson was in the studio, working on a new record. Lachey said, "She's finally writing her own music, which I've told her she could do forever but she's been shy about stepping out there and doing it. But she's an incredible writer, and she's doing stuff that's really from the heart." About the album's sound, he said, "It's a much more organic record and it's more true to herself ... There's all live instrumentation and it's very musical as opposed to the pop thing that was happening before for her. I think she finally feels like this is her record and her chance to do exactly what she wants." In March 2003, Simpson revealed that her third album would be called In This Skin.

== Production and development ==
I was always shy about expressing my own point of view, but now, I think I have things figured out as a woman, and I want to give fans a piece of my heart and soul. Making this record was a great experience — not to mention wonderful therapy.

— Simpson about making the record.

Simpson said in an interview with Billboard, "I wanted to make a romantic, organic album, there are songs that say something that I hope will move or inspire people." Billboard's Chuck Taylor compared the record to her first album, saying, "Simpson's soaring vocals give 'In This Skin' a smooth touch, as it sways between spirited midtempo melodies and her signature ballads."

Originally, the album was planned to be primarily produced by American rapper Missy Elliott, while the sole featured appearance was to be made by Nick Lachey. However, the pair's contributions never made the final cut of the album. About the recording process, Simpson said that A&R executive Teresa LaBarbera Whites "had the incredible idea of creating a songwriting camp. I would go from room to room with one songwriter after another... We would sit there for two or three hours—write an entire song—and then go in and record it in 90 minutes. It was so refreshing." Much of the album was recorded in Nashville and Los Angeles, with the help of established writers and producers.

"Sweetest Sin"
18 second sample from the mid-tempo ballad written by Dianne Warren.

"Sweetest Sin," the album's first single, was written by Diane Warren and is about losing one's virginity. MTV described the song as a "sweet track." In an interview with Billboard, Simpson said the song was "nothing negative, it's all about love." About the second single, "With You," Simpson said, "It's cool for me just because it's my personality ... Nick loves me with nothing but a T-shirt on so that's where the song idea came from."

Billboard cited "I Have Loved You" and "Underneath" as the most expressive tracks from the album, citing the latter as "a four-month period where Simpson and Lachey called it quits, then-in the wake of Sep. 11, 2001 ... realized the value of making a relationship work." The magazine described the title track as "a plucky pop anthem about self-acceptance." About the song, Simpson said, "I was 102 pounds and people at the record label were telling me that I needed to lose weight. The song is saying that I am worthy to feel beautiful in my skin. It's something that every woman experiences in one way or another."

The album was subsequently reissued with three new recordings: an acoustic version of "With You" and two covers. The Berlin cover "Take My Breath Away" is Simpson and Lachey's love theme, she said, "because it was playing the first time Nick kissed me." Simpson also said that she had "been obsessed with 'Take My Breath Away' for a very long time." Another cover on the album was Robbie Williams' "Angels." Simpson described the recording session for the two songs as difficult because she had to do both songs in one day. Lachey helped produce the vocals for both songs, and Simpson credited him with helping her get in the right mood by keeping his hand in her back pocket "and being right there" during the recording session.

== Promotion ==
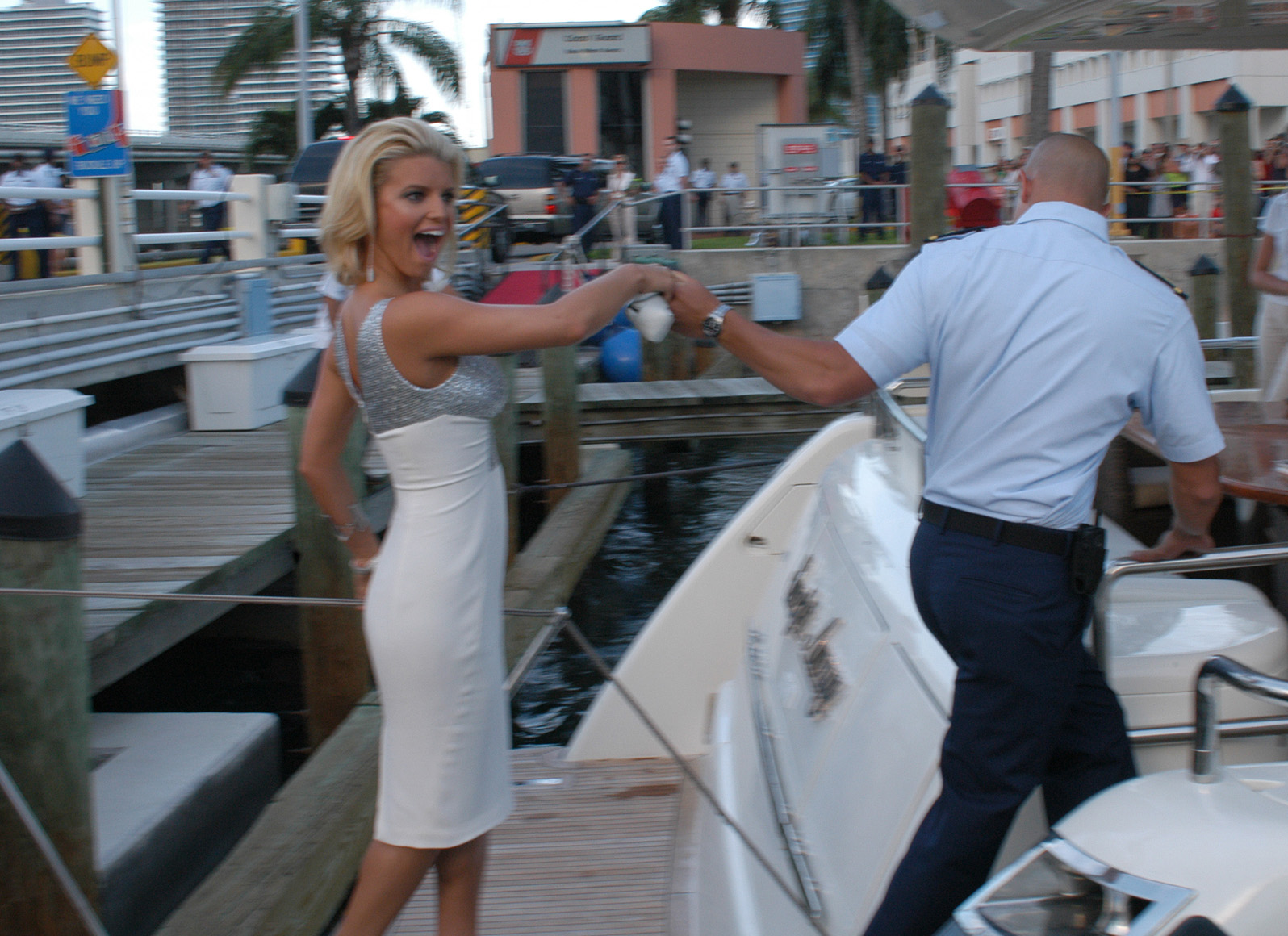
Simpson arriving at the 2004 MTV Video Music Awards in Miami, Florida on August 29, 2004

Simpson performed "Sweetest Sin" live at the Trump Taj Mahal in Atlantic City, New Jersey. The performance, dedicated to Lachey, was recorded and later broadcast on the second season of Newlyweds: Nick and Jessica. "With You" was also performed on American late-night show The Tonight Show with Jay Leno and American morning show Live with Regis and Kelly on October 17 and October 23, 2003. She also gave a memorable performance of "With You"/"Angels" at 2004 MTV Video Music Awards. The promotion of "Angels" by Simpson was extensive; she sang a Spanglish duet of the song with Spanish singer David Bisbal at the 2004 Latin Grammy Awards, performed it on VH1 Divas 2004 and on shows like Late Show with David Letterman and The Early Show. She later performed it during the seventh season of Dancing with the Stars.

=== The Reality Tour ===
The Reality Tour to promote In This Skin was the second concert tour by Jessica Simpson. While promoting the re-release of her album, Simpson stated in several interviews the possibility of a tour, wanting to break away from filming her TV series and connect with her fans. The tour was officially announced in May 2004 through various media outlets, with sponsorship from Ice Breakers and Proactiv Solution.

During an interview with the Associated Press, the singer said she wanted the concerts to focus on her music and her personality. Onstage, Simpson was joined by a seven-piece band, with no dancers or choreography for the show. Simpson would perform songs from her three current albums, while providing anecdotes about her life and the songs. Unseen footage from her reality series and variety show (titled The Nick and Jessica Variety Hour) were included in the show as well. Each night, the singer dedicated "I Have Loved You" to the American armed forces and conducted a Q&A session with contest winners.

Before the tour commenced, Simpson performed at several radio-sponsored music festivals including Your Show, Wango Tango, Summer Music Mania, Zootopia, Kiss Concert, and Play Safe in the Park.

The tour began in Chula Vista in May, visiting over 50 cities, ending in West Springfield. Despite early reports of poor ticket sales, Simpson's tour became one of the biggest summer tours in North America, prompting the singer to add more shows in the U.S. The tour ranked number 86 on Pollstar's "Top 100 Tours 2004", earning over seven million dollars.

== Singles ==
"Sweetest Sin"
18 second sample from the mid-tempo ballad written by Dianne Warren.

"Sweetest Sin" was released as the lead single from In This Skin. The music video, directed by Dean Paraskavopoulos, starts with black-and-white shots of Simpson dancing and looking at viewers. It cuts to Simpson swaying on a beach, and embracing Nick Lachey underneath a waterfall on the beach. Further scenes are presented, such as one in which Simpson lies on a bed by herself. The video continues with intercut footage of the previous scenes, until the final seconds of the song, when Simpson is joined by her husband, in which they move on their bed on the beach. The video ends when Lachey disappears, leaving the singer alone. "With You" was released as the album's second single on September 16, 2003. The song received positive reviews from critics, and enjoyed more success, reaching at top ten on Australia and UK and top-twenty on Ireland, Norway and United States. The single was her first number one in Top 40 Mainstream chart. Later was certified Gold in US and Platinum on Australia. The video of the song was released as a DVD single. Simpson received one and only MTV Europe Music Award nomination for Best Female, enjoying her commercial success outside America. It received two MTV Video Music Award nominations for Best Female Video and Best Pop Video. "I Have Loved You" peaked at number one on Paraguay Charts.

== Critical reception ==
Professional ratings
Review scores
Source	Rating
AllMusic	2.5/5 stars
Entertainment Weekly	C−
Rolling Stone	2/5 stars
Slant Magazine	2.5/5 stars
Stylus Magazine	D+
USA Today	2.5/4 stars

Initial critical response to In This Skin was mixed. Sal Cinquemani of Slant Magazine gave the album 2.5 stars and criticized it as "glossy, ever-so-slightly over-produced ... weighed down by soggy, overwrought pop ballads" and "sickeningly sweet" lyrics. However, he praised "Forbidden Fruit," comparing it to Madonna's single "Music," and "Loving You," which he described as "a seductively contrived reminder that, with teen pop long dead, Simpson should be aiming to recapture the club audience that helped launch her career with 'I Wanna Love You Forever.'"

Stephen Thomas Erlewine from AllMusic also gave the album 2.5 stars in a mixed review, writing, "The problem with In This Skin is that its heart is in the mature middle of the road but its sound is still pitched too young, making [it] a record that satisfies neither audience."

Jon Caramanica of Rolling Stone gave the album 2 stars, criticizing Simpson's lack of vocal "subtlety." However, he added, "Her powerful voice is done a disservice by insipid songwriting and arrangements — as on the loathsome club track 'Forbidden Fruit' and the uncomfortably stately ballad 'You Don't Have to Let Go' — that consistently get in the way of her pipes."

== Commercial performance ==
In This Skin debuted at number 10 on the Billboard 200 albums chart with 64,000 copies sold. Within five months of release, the album had sold 565,000 copies. In March 2004, the album was re-released and it jumped from number 16 to number two, selling 160,000 copies in that week and seeing a 205% increase in sales. It was her highest weekly sales at the time, beating the sales of her sophomore album Irresistible, which debuted at number six with 120,000 copies. On August 19, 2004, it was reported that after a year of release, In This Skin had sold over 2.4 million copies in the US. As of February 2009, it has sold 2.9 million copies, according to Billboard. In total the album charted on the Billboard 200 for 75 consecutive weeks. Towards the end of 2004 In This Skin was ranked at number 14 on Billboard's year-end albums chart. In December 2004, the album was certified triple platinum by the RIAA for shipments of three million copies.

In Australia, April 4, the album debuted at number 40. In peaked at number 13 in its seventh week, becoming Simpson's highest album peak in Australia to date. In This Skin stayed in the top 50 for 27 weeks. The album was later certified Platinum by the ARIA. In Ireland, In This Skin debuted at number 58. In its second week fell to number 75, but in its fourth week the album rose to a new peak of number 27. The album remained in the top 75 for 8 weeks. In the UK, the album debuted at number 36, the same peak of her first album Sweet Kisses. It stayed on the chart for 9 weeks and it was certified Silver by the British Phonographic Industry (BPI). In Canada, the album reached number 45 in May 2004. The album stayed on the chart for 30 weeks. It was later certified Gold by the CRIA. In Switzerland, it peaked at number 78 and remained on the chart for three weeks. At the end of 2004 In This Skin was ranked as the 35th best selling album globally by the IFPI. As of 2020, In This Skin has sold 7 million copies worldwide.

== Track listing ==
=== Original release ===
Standard edition
No.	Title	Writer(s)	Producer(s)	Length
1.	"Sweetest Sin"	Diane Warren	Ric Wake; Richie Jones^{[a]}	3:14
2.	"With You"	Jessica Simpson; Andy Marvel; Billy Mann	Marvel; Mann	3:12
3.	"My Way Home"	Simpson; Damon Elliott; Romeo Antonio	Elliott	3:13
4.	"I Have Loved You"	Holly Lamar; Greg Barnhill; Denise Rich	Lamar; Barnhill; David Munk^{[b]}; Lee Mars^{[b]}	4:45
5.	"Forbidden Fruit"	Simpson; Greg Fitzgerald; Thomas Nichols	Fitzgerald	3:30
6.	"Everyday See You"	Simpson; Andrew Williams; Franne Golde; Kasia Livingston	Williams; Golde; Livingston	4:18
7.	"Underneath"	Simpson; Matthew Gerrard; Trina Harmon	Keith Thomas	4:02
8.	"You Don't Have to Let Go"	Simpson; Jason Deere; Harmon	Harmon	3:43
9.	"Loving You"	Simpson; Elliott; Craig Young	Elliott	3:31
10.	"In This Skin"	Simpson; Rob Fusari; Harmon	Fusari	4:18
11.	"Be"	Simpson; Williams; Golde; Livingston	Williams; Golde; Livingston	4:11
Total length:				41:57

Japanese edition
No.	Title	Writer(s)	Producer(s)	Length
12.	"Fly"	Simpson	Mann	3:32
13.	"My Love"	Simpson. Harmon	Harmon	4:09
Total length:				54:23

2023 limited edition bonus LP
No.	Title	Writer(s)	Producer(s)	Length
1.	"Take My Breath Away"	Giorgio Moroder; Tom Whitlock	Mann	3:15
2.	"With You" (acoustic version)	Simpson; Marvel; Mann	Mann	3:16
3.	"Angels"	Robbie Williams; Guy Chambers	Billy Mann	4:05
Total length:				52:15

=== Reissue ===
Standard edition
No.	Title	Writer(s)	Producer(s)	Length
1.	"Angels"	Robbie Williams; Guy Chambers	Billy Mann	4:05
2.	"With You"	Jessica Simpson; Andy Marvel; Mann	Mann; Marvel	3:11
3.	"Take My Breath Away"	Giorgio Moroder; Tom Whitlock	Mann	3:15
4.	"My Way Home"	Simpson; Damon Elliott; Romeo Antonio	Elliott	3:12
5.	"Sweetest Sin"	Diane Warren	Ric Wake; Richie Jones^{[a]}	3:19
6.	"I Have Loved You"	Holly Lamar; Greg Barnhill; Denise Rich	Lamar; Barnhill; David Munk^{[b]}; Lee Mars^{[b]}	4:45
7.	"Forbidden Fruit"	Simpson; Greg Fitzgerald; Thomas Nichols	Fitzgerald	3:29
8.	"Everyday See You"	Simpson; Andrew Williams; Franne Golde; Kasia Livingston	Williams; Golde; Livingston	4:17
9.	"Underneath"	Simpson; Matthew Gerrard; Trina Harmon	Thomas	4:01
10.	"You Don't Have to Let Go"	Simpson; Jason Deere; Harmon	Harmon	3:40
11.	"Loving You"	Simpson; Elliott; Craig Young	Elliott	3:28
12.	"In This Skin"	Simpson; Rob Fusari; Harmon	Fusari	4:18
13.	"Be"	Simpson; Williams; Golde; Livingston	Williams; Golde; Livingston	4:09
14.	"With You" (acoustic version – bonus track)	Simpson; Marvel; Mann	Mann	3:16
Total length:				52:15

Spanish digital special edition
No.	Title	Writer(s)	Producer(s)	Length
15.	"I Think I'm in Love with You"	Cory Rooney; Dan Shea; John Mellencamp	Rooney; Shea	3:18
16.	"I Wanna Love You Forever"	Sam Watters; Louis Biancaniello	Watters; Biancaniello	4:24
17.	"Irresistible"	Anders Bagge; Arnthor Birgisson; Pamela Sheyne	Bagge; Birgisson	3:13

Notes

- The Chinese release of In This Skin omits "Sweetest Sin".
- ^{^[a]} signifies an additional producer.
- ^{^[b]} signifies a vocal producer.

== Personnel ==
Credits adapted from AllMusic.

- J.D. Andrew – digital editing, engineer
- Jim Annunziato – assistant engineer, mixing assistant
- Romeo Antonio – electric guitar
- Rich Balmer – engineer
- Greg Barnhill – producer
- Charlie Bisharat – violin
- Dan Bucchi – mixing assistant
- Pat Buchanan – electric guitar
- Julian Bunetta – engineer, string arrangements, strings
- Darryl Bush – production coordination
- John Catchings – cello
- Earl Cohen – tracking
- J. T. Corenflos – electric guitar
- Chad Cromwell – drums
- Neil Devor – engineer
- Tony Duran – photography
- Damon Elliott – keyboards, percussion, producer, programming
- Greg Fitzgerald – producer
- Rob Fusari – producer
- James Ginnetti – keyboards
- Chris Goercke – acoustic guitar
- Franne Golde – piano, producer, vocals, background vocals
- Kara DioGuardi – background vocals
- Trina Harmon – piano, producer, string arrangements, strings
- Carlos Henderson – bass
- Dan Hetzel – digital editing, engineer, mixing
- Hooshik – collage
- Jun Ishizeki – assistant engineer
- Richie Jones – producer, programming
- Jennifer Karr – background vocals
- Anthony Kilhoffer – assistant engineer
- Brendan Kuntz – assistant engineer, mixing assistant
- Eric Kupper – acoustic guitar, keyboards
- Holly Lamar – producer
- Victor Lawrence – cello
- Kasia Livingston – producer, background vocals
- Billy Mann – arranger, drum programming, engineer, electric guitar, producer
- Lee Mars – mixing, vocal producer
- Andy Marvel – arranger, drum programming, engineer, midi guitar, keyboard programming, producer
- Tony Maserati – mixing
- Dave Matthews – engineer
- Mary Maurer – art direction
- Bart Migal – tracking
- Nick Moroch – acoustic guitar
- Pablo Munguia – engineer, vocal engineer
- David Munk – vocal producer
- Dave Pensado – mixing
- Alison Prestwood – bass
- Greg Price – assistant engineer
- Mark Russell – production coordination
- Dave Scheuer – digital editing, engineer
- Jaime Sickora – engineer, vocal engineer
- Jessica Simpson – primary artist, vocals
- Matt Snedecor – mixing assistant
- Michael Spriggs – acoustic guitar
- Keith Thomas – arranger, bass, keyboards, mixing, producer, programming
- Luz Vasquez – assistant engineer, mixing assistant
- John LeVasseur – engineer, Mellotron
- Rick Wake – producer
- Bill Whittington – mixing
- Andrew Williams – engineer, instrumentation, producer
- Ethan Willoughby – assistant
- Patrick Woodward – mixing
- Chris Yoakum – digital editing, MIDI technician
- Jonathan Yudkin – strings

== Charts ==
=== Weekly charts ===
Weekly chart performance for In This Skin
Chart (2003–2004)	Peak position
Australian Albums (ARIA)	13
Canadian Albums (Nielsen SoundScan)	45
French Albums (SNEP)	117
Irish Albums (IRMA)	27
Japanese Albums (Oricon)	89
Scottish Albums (OCC)	35
South Korean Albums (RIAK)	18
Swiss Albums (Schweizer Hitparade)	78
UK Albums (OCC)	36
US Billboard 200	2

=== Year-end charts ===
Year-end chart performance for In This Skin
Chart (2004)	Position
Australian Albums (ARIA)	50
US Billboard 200	14
Worldwide Albums (IFPI)	35

=== Decade-end charts ===
Decade-end chart performance for In This Skin
Chart (2000–2009)	Position
US Billboard 200	153

== Certifications and sales ==
Region	Certification	Certified units/sales
Australia (ARIA)	Platinum	70,000^{^}
Canada (Music Canada)	Gold	50,000^{^}
Japan (RIAJ)	—	10,000
Singapore	—	1,500
South Korea (GAON)	—	3,003
United Kingdom (BPI)	Silver	60,000^{‡}
United States (RIAA)	3× Platinum	3,000,000^{^}
Summaries
Worldwide	—	7,000,000
^{^} Shipments figures based on certification alone.^{‡} Sales+streaming figures based on certification alone.

== Release history ==
Region	Date	Edition	Label	Format(s)	Catalog	Ref.
Canada	August 19, 2003	Standard	Sony Music	CD	CK 86560	
United States	August 19, 2003	Standard	Columbia	CD	86560	
Japan	August 27, 2003	Standard	Sony Music	CD	SICP 425	
Canada	March 2, 2004	Collector's	Sony Music	CD; CD+DVD	CK 91876	
Europe	March 2, 2004	Collector's	Sony Music	CD; CD+DVD	COL 5124399 (CD); 5124393000 (CD+DVD)	
United States	March 2, 2004	Collector's	Columbia	CD; CD+DVD	CK 92041	
United Kingdom	April 19, 2004	Standard	Sony Music	CD	512499000	
Australia	September 4, 2004	Standard	Sony Music	CD	5124399000	
