= Reality Tour (Jessica Simpson) =

2004 concert tour by Jessica Simpson

- Tour by Jessica Simpson
- Promotional poster for the tour
- Location: North America
- Associated album: In This Skin
- Start date: May 14, 2004
- End date: October 3, 2004
- Legs: 1
- No. of shows: 56
- Attendance: 249,471 (41 shows)
- Box office: $7.1 million (41 shows)

Jessica Simpson concert chronology
- DreamChaser Tour (2001); Reality Tour (2004); ...

The Reality Tour was the second concert tour by American recording artist Jessica Simpson. Predominately visiting the United States, the tour supported Simpson's third studio album, In This Skin (2003). According to the singer, the title derives from her recent success on the reality TV series, Newlyweds: Nick and Jessica, while showcasing her music on a natural level. The tour began in Chula Vista in May and ended in October in West Springfield.

Despite early reports of poor ticket sales, Simpson's tour became one of the biggest summer tours in North America.

To date, the tour serves as Simpson's last major concert tour. The tour ranked number 86 on Pollstar's "Top 100 Tours 2004", earning over seven million dollars out of 41 shows.

== Background ==
While promoting the re-release of her album, Simpson stated in several interviews the possibility of a tour, wanting to break away from filming her TV series and connect with her fans. The tour was officially announced in May 2004 through various media outlets, with sponsorship from Ice Breakers and Proactiv Solution.

During an interview with the Associated Press, the singer says she wanted the concerts to focus on her music and her personality. Onstage, Simpson was joined by a seven-piece band, with no dancers or choreography for the show. Simpson would perform songs from her three current albums, while providing anecdotes about her life and the songs. Unseen footage from her reality series and variety show (entitled The Nick and Jessica Variety Hour) were included in the show as well. Each night, the singer dedicated "I Have Loved You" to the American armed forces and conduct a Q&A session with contest winners.

Before the tour commenced, Simpson performed at several radio-sponsored music festivals including: Your Show, Wango Tango, Summer Music Mania, Zootopia, Kiss Concert, Last Chance Summer Dance, and Play Safe in the Park.

To introduce the tour, Simpson stated:

"This is definitely a big tour for me. I'm a little nervous. It's like you're a little shaky about will I sell tickets to such a big market? […] But it's cool to put together such a huge production. And we're calling it the 'Reality Tour', from the show ['Newlyweds']. And there'll be all kinds of stuff showing never-seen clips and just kind of putting my personality into the tour, which will be a lot of fun."

== Opening acts ==
- Ryan Cabrera (Leg 1)
- Cherie (Salt Lake City)
- Shifty Shellshock (Salt Lake City)

== Set list ==
1. "I Think I'm in Love with You"
2. "A Little Bit"
3. "Forbidden Fruit"
4. "I Have Loved You"
5. "She Works Hard for the Money"
6. "Take My Breath Away"
7. "Angels"
8. "Be"
9. "Everyday See You"
10. "You Don't Have To Let Go"
11. "My Way Home"
12. "Loving You"
13. "Sweetest Sin"
14. "I Wanna Love You Forever"
15. "Irresistible"

Encore

16. "With You"

== Tour dates ==
Date	City	Country	Venue
North America
May 14, 2004^{[A]}	Chula Vista	United States	Coors Amphitheatre
May 15, 2004^{[B]}	Pasadena	United States	Rose Bowl
May 20, 2004^{[C]}	Glendale	United States	Glendale Arena
May 21, 2004^{[D]}	New York City	United States	Madison Square Garden
May 22, 2004^{[E]}	New York City	United States	Rumsey Playfield
May 22, 2004^{[F]}	Mansfield	United States	Tweeter Center
June 4, 2004	New Orleans	United States	New Orleans Arena
June 5, 2004	Pelham	United States	Oak Mountain Amphitheatre
June 6, 2004	Jacksonville	United States	Jacksonville Veterans Memorial Arena
June 8, 2004	Antioch	United States	Starwood Amphitheatre
June 11, 2004	Orlando	United States	TD Waterhouse Centre
June 12, 2004	West Palm Beach	United States	Sound Advice Amphitheatre
June 13, 2004	Tampa	United States	St. Pete Times Forum
June 15, 2004	Charlotte	United States	Verizon Wireless Amphitheatre
June 17, 2004	Uncasville	United States	Mohegan Sun Arena
June 18, 2004	New York City	United States	Radio City Music Hall
June 19, 2004	Bristow	United States	Nissan Pavilion
June 20, 2004	Raleigh	United States	Alltel Pavilion
June 25, 2004	Clarkston	United States	DTE Energy Music Theatre
June 26, 2004	Columbus	United States	Germain Amphitheater
June 27, 2004	Indianapolis	United States	Verizon Wireless Music Center
June 29, 2004^{[G]}	Milwaukee	United States	Marcus Amphitheater
June 30, 2004	Cincinnati	United States	Riverbend Music Center
July 2, 2004	Hershey	United States	Star Pavilion
July 3, 2004	Burgettstown	United States	Post-Gazette Pavilion
July 4, 2004^{[H]}	Camden	United States	Tweeter Center at the Waterfront
July 6, 2004	Tinley Park	United States	Tweeter Center
July 7, 2004	Maryland Heights	United States	UMB Bank Pavilion
July 8, 2004	Bonner Springs	United States	Verizon Wireless Amphitheater
July 10, 2004	Dallas	United States	Smirnoff Music Centre
July 11, 2004	Oklahoma City	United States	Ford Center
July 14, 2004	Houston	United States	Toyota Center
July 16, 2004	San Antonio	United States	SBC Center
July 17, 2004	Lubbock	United States	United Spirit Arena
July 18, 2004	Albuquerque	United States	Journal Pavilion
July 20, 2004	Denver	United States	Universal Lending Pavilion
July 21, 2004^{[I]}	Salt Lake City	United States	USANA Amphitheatre
July 23, 2004	Vancouver	Canada	General Motors Place
July 24, 2004	Auburn	United States	White River Amphitheatre
July 25, 2004	Ridgefield	United States	The Amphitheater at Clark County
July 27, 2004	Mountain View	United States	Shoreline Amphitheatre
July 28, 2004	Sacramento	United States	Sleep Train Amphitheatre
July 30, 2004	Los Angeles	United States	Universal Amphitheatre
July 31, 2004^{[J]}	Costa Mesa	United States	Pacific Amphitheatre
August 1, 2004^{[K]}	Paso Robles	United States	Main Grandstand Arena
September 11, 2004	Pensacola	United States	Pensacola Civic Center
September 12, 2004	Jackson	United States	Mississippi Coliseum
September 15, 2004	Memphis	United States	Mud Island Amphitheater
September 17, 2004	Cleveland	United States	Plain Dealer Pavilion
September 19, 2004	Fairfax	United States	Patriot Center
September 21, 2004	Atlanta	United States	Chastain Park Amphitheater
September 27, 2004	Manchester	United States	Verizon Wireless Arena
September 28, 2004	Providence	United States	Dunkin' Donuts Center
September 30, 2004	Boston	United States	Bank of America Pavilion
October 2, 2004	Bridgewater Township	United States	Commerce Bank Ballpark
October 3, 2004	West Springfield	United States	Comcast Stage

Festivals and other miscellaneous performances

^{A} This concert was a part of "KHTS-FM's Channel 93.3 concert"
^{B} This concert was a part of "KIIS-FM Wango Tango"
^{C} This concert was a part of "Summer Music Mania"
^{D} This concert was a part of "Z-100 Zootopia"
^{E} This concert was part of "Play Safe in the Park"
^{F} This concert was a part of "KISS-108 FM"
^{G} This concert was a part of "Summerfest"
^{H} This concert was a part of "Q Concert"
^{I} This concert was a part of "97.1 ZHT Birthday Bash"
^{J} This concert was a part of the "Orange County Fair"
^{K} This concert was a part of the "Budweiser Grandstand Concert Series"

Cancellations and rescheduled shows

June 22, 2004	Providence, Rhode Island	Dunkin' Donuts Center	Cancelled; rescheduled to September 28, 2004
June 23, 2004	Manchester, New Hampshire	Verizon Wireless Arena	Cancelled; rescheduled to September 27, 2004

== Broadcasts and recordings ==
Rehearsals and select performances from the tour were seen on Simpson's MTV show and her sister's show, The Ashlee Simpson Show. The show was filmed at the Universal Amphitheatre for DVD release. The DVD was released in November 2004 and omitted the performances of "A Little Bit", 'She Works Hard for the Money" and "I Wanna Love You Forever". The set featured the music video for "Angels" along with a behind the scenes look at the making of the video. The DVD showed strong sales within its first week and was certified platinum by the RIAA, recognizing shipments exceeding 100,000 copies.

Chart (2004)	Peak position
US Top Music Videos (Billboard)	8

== Critical reception ==
Overall, the tour received mixed reviews from music critics. Many applaud Simpson's onstage persona but felt the show itself felt unfinished. Jim Farber (New York Daily News) felt Simpson's vocals during her show at the Radio City Music Hall were "overdramatic". He followed with, "Not that Simpson didn't give it her all as a singer. Pulling a Mariah Carey, she belted every note to the rafters. While she clearly lacks Ms. Carey's pipes, a gross excess of amplification, and some apparently recorded vocal helper, allowed her to simulate diva-status. Too bad the songs from her three CDs all sound like pieces fished out of Britney Spears slush pile". Dustin J. Seibert (The Cincinnati Enquirer) felt the singer's concert at the Riverbend Music Center was "honest and warm" He elaborates, "Simpson's reliance on her high-octane voice and bubbly personality set her apart from some of her pop counterparts. Her shows featured no pyrotechnics or funky choreography, just her butter-melting octave range over a smooth six-piece band and two backup singers".

Neva Chonin (San Francisco Chronicle) criticized Simpson's vocal performance at the Shoreline Amphitheatre. She writes, "A rendition of Berlin's 'Take My Breath Away', dedicated to her husband, sounded like an ode to autoerotic asphyxiation. [...] With her band successfully drowning out her tuneful but wispy vocals, Simpson led sing-alongs for anesthetized funk number 'The Sweetest Sin' and an encore of 'With You'". Joey Guerra (Houston Chronicle) admired Simpson's personality during her performance at the Toyota Center; but felt the singer's concert was "uneven". He explains, "Her material is also a bit thin to sustain a full concert. Many album tracks began to sound alike after a while, and her few certifiable hits popped up late in the evening. 'Irresistible' came at the end of the show, and the feel-good anthem 'With You' was the expected encore. Even odder was the omission of 'I Wanna Love You Forever', Simpson's breakthrough single."
