= DreamChaser Tour (Jessica Simpson) =

2001 concert tour by Jessica Simpson

DreamChaser Tour (2001)
- Tour by Jessica Simpson
- Location: North America
- Associated album: Irresistible
- Start date: August 7, 2001
- End date: October 27, 2001
- Legs: 1
- No. of shows: 15

Jessica Simpson concert chronology
- DreamChaser Tour (2001); Reality Tour (2004)

The DreamChaser Tour was the debut concert tour by American recording artist Jessica Simpson. It supported her second studio album, Irresistible and visited United States.

== Background ==
In contrast to her earlier co-headlining tour with boyband 98 Degrees, Simpson wanted DreamChaser to showcase her as a true pop singer and a real performer, in the vein of Britney Spears. Simpson decided to make the tour "risqué" by adding sexy backup dancers and showing her trim figure more, wearing body-accentuating costumes. She undertook rigorous dance rehearsals for the tour, as she felt that she had to compete with Spears (a natural, trained dancer since childhood). The tour was set up on a portable stage called the "Extreme Mobile Venue", with a capacity of 10,000 people, and was erected in mall parking lots. The collapsible arena featured a 300' (91 m) performance stage, built with a sound system and lights. Arrangements for concertgoers to bungee jump, climb a rock wall, and go 'mechanical surfing' while the singer was not performing were also provided. The venue featured interactive games and exhibits, and was supported by a 9-foot (2.7 m)-high ramp for extreme motorcycle riders. The tour openers included Eden's Crush, Youngstown, Toya, and Plus One. It was choreographed by Dan Karaty.

The tour launched on August 7, 2001, at Corpus Christi, Texas, and ran twenty-five dates through mid-September. Tickets price ranged between $29.99 and $39.99. In an interview with Deseret News, Simpson said that it "was a fun tour. That was like a preparation for me. It was one of those things where I just wanted to go out and meet all my fans." A video tape, titled Dream Chaser, was released on January 22, 2002, which included Simpson's biography, music videos, behind-the-scenes looks at "Irresistible" and "A Little Bit", and footage from the tour. The tape reached number twenty-five on Billboard Top Music Videos chart, for the issue dated February 9, 2002.

== Setlist ==
1. "Hot Like Fire"
2. "I Think I'm In Love With You"
3. "I've Got My Eyes On You"
4. "When You Told Me You Loved Me"
5. "A Little Bit"
6. "What's It Gonna Be"
7. "Imagination"
8. "Final Heartbreak"
9. "Where You Are"
10. "For Your Love"
11. "His Eye is On The Sparrow" / "I Believe I Can Fly"
12. "I Wanna Love You Forever"
13. "Forever In Your Eyes"
14. "I Never"

Encore

15. "Irresistible" (contains elements of So So Def Remix)

== Tour dates ==
Date	City
North America
August 7, 2001	Corpus Christi
August 8, 2001	Belton
August 10, 2001	Joplin
August 11, 2001	Tulsa
August 13, 2001	Mankato
August 14, 2001	Sioux City
August 16, 2001	Green Bay
August 17, 2001	Madison
August 18, 2001	Moline
August 19, 2001	Cincinnati
August 31, 2001	Gilford
September 3, 2001	San Juan
September 8, 2001	Allegan
September 23, 2001	Honolulu
October 27, 2001	Santa Clara
