= This Is the Remix =

This Is the Remix may refer to:

- This Is the Remix (Destiny's Child album)
- This Is the Remix (Jessica Simpson album)
