= This Is the Remix (Jessica Simpson album) =

Remix album by Jessica Simpson
- Released: July 2, 2002
- Recorded: 1998–2001
- Genres: Pop; dance; trance
- Length: 53:03
- Label: Columbia
- Producers: Dan Shea; Louis Biancaniello; Sam Watters; Corey Rooney; John Mellencamp; Anders "Bag" Bagge; Arnthor Birgisson; Jermaine Dupri; Pamela Sheyne; Dave Siegel; Kara DioGuardi; Steve Morales

Jessica Simpson chronology
Irresistible (2001)	This Is the Remix (2002)	In This Skin (2003)

Singles from This Is the Remix
- 1. "Irresistible (So So Def Remix)" Released: October 1, 2001

This Is the Remix is the first remix album by American recording artist Jessica Simpson, released on July 2, 2002, by Columbia Records. The album contains remixes of tracks from her first two studio albums Sweet Kisses (1999) and Irresistible (2001). The remixes were done by DJs such as Peter Rauhofer and Hex Hector. The music was influenced by various genres of electronic music, such as ambient and techno. This Is the Remix did not include any new recordings.

The album charted at number eighteen on Billboard's Top Electronic Albums Chart.

== Background ==
On April 15, 2002, Columbia Records announced through a press release that Simpson would release a remix album titled This Is the Remix. The album includes songs from her previous albums remixed by DJs such as Peter Rauhofer and Hex Hector. So So Def Recordings was responsible for the remix of "Irresistible." The So So Def remix of the track, produced by Jermaine Dupri, features guest appearances by rapper Lil' Bow Wow and Dupri.

== Commercial performance ==
In the United States, the album charted at number eighteen on US Billboard Dance/Electronic Albums chart.

== Track listing ==
This Is the Remix — Standard edition
No.	Title	Writer(s)	Remixer(s)	Length
1.	"I Wanna Love You Forever" (Soul Solution Club Mix)	Louis Biancaniello; Sam Watters	Soul Solution	4:04
2.	"I Wanna Love You Forever" (Soul Solution Extended Club Mix)	Biancaniello; Watters	Soul Solution	9:28
3.	"I Think I'm in Love with You" (Peter Rauhofer Club Mix)	Cory Rooney; Dan Shea; John Mellencamp	Rauhofer	9:19
4.	"I Think I'm in Love with You" (Lenny B's Club Mix)	Rooney; Shea; Mellencamp	Lenny Bertoldo	9:39
5.	"Irresistible" (So So Def Remix) (featuring Lil' Bow Wow)	Anders Bagge; Arnthor Birgisson; Pamela Sheyne; Jermaine Dupri	So So Def	3:35
6.	"Irresistible" (Hex Hector Club Mix)	Bagge; Birgisson; Sheyne	Hector	8:54
7.	"A Little Bit" (Chris "The Greek" and Guido Club Mix)	Kara DioGuardi; Steve Morales; David Siegel	Guido Osorio	7:55
Total length:				53:03

== Personnel ==
Adapted from the This Is The Remix liner notes.

- Phil Tan – mixing
- Guido Osorio – remix producer
- Soul Solutiono – remix producer
- Peter Rauhofer – producer, remix producer
- Hex Hector – producer, remixing
- Lenny Bertoldo – producer, remixing
- Bow Wow – performer
- Bryan-Michael Cox – remixing
- Teresa LaBarbera Whites – A&R
- Jermaine Dupri – remixing, mixing
- Brian Frye – engineer

== Charts ==
Chart (2002)	Peak position
US Dance/Electronic Albums (Billboard)	18
