= Irresistible (Jessica Simpson album) =

Studio album by Jessica Simpson
- Released: May 25, 2001
- Recorded: July 2000 – March 2001
- Studios: Cove City Sound Studios (Glen Cove, NY); The Hit Factory (New York, NY); Homesite 13 (Novato, CA); Lobo Recording Studios (Deer Park, NY); Murlyn Studios (Stockholm, Sweden); The Record Plant (Los Angeles, CA); Sony Music Studios (New York, NY); Sony Scoring Stage (Culver City, CA); Sound Gallery Studios (Los Angeles, CA); Cello Studios (Hollywood, CA); WallyWorld Studios (California)
- Genres: Pop; teen pop; dance-pop; R&B
- Length: 50:43
- Label: Columbia
- Producers: Walter Afanasieff; Louis Biancaniello; Rodney Jerkins; Rhett Lawrence; Steve Morales; Cory Rooney; Ric Wake; Sam Watters; Anders Bagge; Arnthor Birgisson; Troy Oliver

Jessica Simpson chronology
Sweet Kisses (1999)	Irresistible (2001)	This Is the Remix (2002)

Singles from Irresistible
- 1. "Irresistible" Released: April 12, 2001; 2. "A Little Bit" Released: August 28, 2001

Irresistible is the second studio album by American recording artist Jessica Simpson, released on May 25, 2001, through Columbia Records. Simpson, who began working on the project in July 2000, contacted already established writers and producers to collaborate on the project, including Cory Rooney, Rodney Jerkins, and Walter Afanasieff. In contrast to her debut album Sweet Kisses (1999), which included more ballads, Irresistible explored hip hop and R&B genres of music. Simpson described the material as "Mariah Carey meets Britney Spears", indicating the soulfulness of the songs as well as their contemporary appeal. Lyrical themes addressed in the album include love and heartbreak, sexuality, and self-respect.

Sweet Kisses, which was aimed at an older audience, did not perform well commercially, and so Simpson re-evaluated her career. At the suggestion of her label executives, Simpson modified her image and sound in Irresistible, deciding to delve more into the teen pop and R&B genres, as she felt that restyling herself to match the image of her contemporaries—Spears and Christina Aguilera—would help rejuvenate her career. After its release, Irresistible received a mixed reception from critics, most of whom were disappointed by the music; some of them also felt it was too generic and over-produced. The album debuted at number six on the US Billboard 200 but quickly fell down the charts afterward. Though the album's initial chart placement was an improvement from her previous endeavor, it failed to match the commercial success of her contemporaries, as the album went on to sell only 755,000 copies in the United States and over two million worldwide. It was certified gold by the Recording Industry Association of America (RIAA) for shipments of 500,000 copies. Elsewhere, the album was moderately successful, reaching the top twenty in Canada and Switzerland and barely cracking the top forty in Sweden, Japan and Germany. It was certified gold in Japan and Canada.

Two singles were released from Irresistible. The title track, the album's lead single, was the most commercially successful, as it reached the top twenty in eleven countries, including no. 11 on the UK Singles Chart, and no. 15 on the US Billboard Hot 100. This was followed by "A Little Bit", which failed to chart in the US, and peaked at no. 62 in Australia.

Simpson promoted songs from Irresistible through a number of televised appearances and live concert events. In 2001, she embarked on the DreamChaser Tour, her debut concert tour, to promote Irresistible and perform select tracks from Sweet Kisses.

== Background ==
I have never been proud of something I've done creatively! Thanks to Tommy Mottola. Your direction has led me to a new place in life, a confident one. You have shown me how to reach in and believe. I have become a better artist because of your talents.

— Simpson, Irresistible liner notes

Simpson signed a record deal with Columbia Records in 1998 and the next year she released her debut album titled Sweet Kisses. The album featured mostly ballads, and was targeted at a more mature audience than the works of her contemporaries, such as Britney Spears, Christina Aguilera or Mandy Moore. Simpson also intended to remain true to her Christian upbringing and values and dress conservatively, unlike her peers. The album only managed a peak of no. 25 on the US Billboard 200, far from the success of the other chart-topping pop "idols". This led Simpson to rethink her career; although she was enjoying some success, and her voice was becoming known, she felt she could improve. Feeling her more "innocent" image would halt her career from developing further, Simpson adopted a more confident, mature image and more uptempo sound, at the suggestion of the Columbia executives.

She moved into the teen-pop genre, as she felt that restyling herself to match the image of Spears and Aguilera would help remake her career. She separated from her then-boyfriend Nick Lachey, in March 2001, feeling the need to concentrate on her career. Her new image was clear through appearances at many events, where Simpson wore more stylish outfits. The development of this image coincided with the production and release of her second studio effort, Irresistible. Simpson said that she wanted to portray a "sexier, more mature style" for her second album. "I recorded Sweet Kisses when I was 17 years old and I'm 21 [this month] so there is four years of growth involved," Simpson said in an interview with Coventry Newspapers in July 2001. In an interview with Cosmopolitan in June 2001, she explained, "This record is about who I am now. The music is edgier, and I'm all grown up." According to Terri Doughtery, author of People in the News: Jessica Simpson and Nick Lachey, Simpson hoped her new image would bring more attention to the power of her voice. "It's not just me singing about being in love. I also have heartbreak-songs and girls-telling-off-guys songs. It's going to take me a while to recoup [on] this album, because we spent a lot of money on it," Simpson said to Entertainment Weekly.

== Development ==
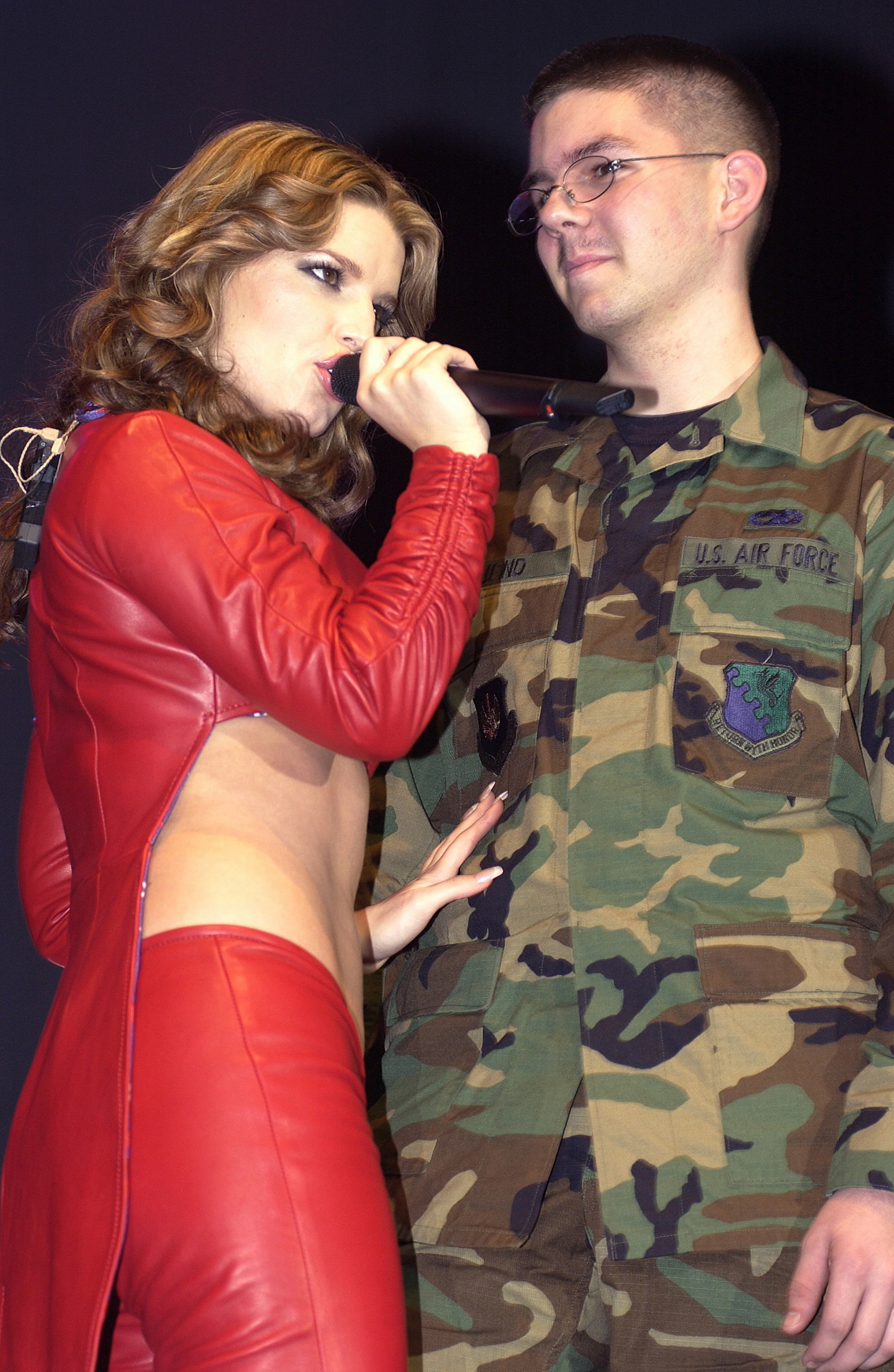
Simpson performing "Irresistible" on the USO Holiday Tour in 2001

Simpson started working on the album in mid-July 2000. While compiling songs for Sweet Kisses, she had expressed inconvenience when a track's lyrics were too suggestive or delivered a message she did not agree with and thus asked for its modification. However, for Irresistible, she decided to let Tommy Mottola, the CEO of Columbia, take control of the whole project. He enlisted many established composers and producers for the album, hand-picked each song for the track list, and rejected those he felt were not so good. Although she had previously announced that she would write a few songs for her second album, Simpson does not share songwriting credits on any of the tracks. On being asked why, she said that she was very shy when it came to songwriting and felt that it requires a lot of "bravery" to write songs. She also expressed that she could not find the right words for the songs and hence did not write for the record. According to Simpson, the album did not have a definite concept or theme; Mottola selected songs which he felt were good enough for Simpson and compiled them into an album.

Described as being very sexy and more grown up by Simpson, the opening title track was written by the Swedish duo Anders Bagge and Arnthor Birgisson, in collaboration with English singer-songwriter Pamela Sheyne. Birgisson told music technology magazine Sound on Sound that they started developing the song after Sheyne proposed the title and concept. Bagge and Birgisson developed the melody and completed the song's lyrics. Sheyne also sings backing vocals in the song. "A Little Bit" was written by Kara DioGuardi, along with Steve Morales and David Siegal. Although she had the written songs for other artists including Kylie Minogue and Martine McCutcheon, the song became DioGuardi's first writing credit for an artist from her native country. Simpson said that "the message behind the song is for the guys to listen to the girl." The next track, "Forever in Your Eyes", was co-written by Lachey, along with Rhett Lawrence.

Walter Afanasieff, long-time Mariah Carey collaborator, worked with Simpson on three cuts from Irresistible. One of the songs, "When You Told Me You Loved Me", was written by Afanasieff in collaboration with Billy Mann. In an interview with Allpop, Simpson named the song as one of her favorites and said, "I really base that on a situation of a friend of mine whose parents are divorced. I like the emotion behind that song." Cory Rooney wrote "Hot Like Fire" solely, which Simpson described as "certainly not kid stuff", a song "with a lot of attitude." Louis Biancaniello and Sam Watters were also brought in to write and produce songs for the album. One of the cuts, "For Your Love", according to Simpson, is reminiscent of "I Wanna Love You Forever" (1999). Simpson covered the gospel hymn "His Eye is on the Sparrow" as the last song of the album. She said, "I wanted to give my audience a piece of my heart and soul. The message is there's so much in life that can get you discouraged, but if you trust that you're being watched over, you have a reason to live and a sense of freedom. It's different for everyone, but for me, my relationship with God is the way I clear out the shadows that hang in our lives."

== Recording and production ==
I'm pretty shy about being in the studio with other people. Marc walked in, sat on the couch, and said, 'Let's tell each other a secret,' so we exchanged stupid, little private things. Then he said, 'For the next six hours, we are going to be completely in love, like we've known each other's lives and secrets for years. [...] We sang to each other the whole time. [...] I think you can hear our friendship coming through here. We really created it together, and I think it has such passion.

— Simpson on "There You Were"'s recording process.

Motolla selected Cory Rooney as the executive producer of Irresistible. Most of the recording and mixing works were done at Sony Music Studios, New York City and was completed over a time span of eight months. Rooney also coordinated the recording process while Robert Williams miked the vocals. Sony's C-800G Tube Condenser Microphone, equipped with a dual large diaphragm and electronically selectable pick-up pattern, was used to record the vocals. In an interview with Sony SoundByte magazine in 2002, Williams said of his choice: "In the studio, it comes down to what you hear. [...] She has such a big range, from a whisper to really belting it out, and you need a microphone that can handle the range without distortion." He had used the microphone for Simpson's first album and felt that it suited her well. He also noted that on ballads, "the S's and wet sounds of lips" are important to the texture of the song. According to him, as Simpson's vocals tended to be "bright", he edited the lower ends of her voice to equalize the track.

To mix the tracks, a Sony Oxford Console was used. Audio engineer Mick Guzauski explained to Sony SoundByte that he used the console's "Automated EQ feature" on the tracks. He said that he could "tailor the frequency responses and dynamics within each song with optimum equalizer at every pitch and level." For the Afanasieff tracks, the background vocals and overdubs were accomplished on the Oxford console at his Wally World Studio B, at San Rafael, California. Simpson's label-mate and Latin singer Marc Anthony is featured as a guest vocalist on the ballad "There You Were". Simpson met Anthony at the taping of the TV special A Christmas in Washington in 2000. They talked to each other, and proposed recording a song on both of their next albums. They sang the song side by side in the studio and the whole song was completed within six hours. "Forever in Your Eyes" was one of the first songs to be recorded for the album, and was produced by Rhett Lawrence. It was recorded at Sony Music Studios within two hours. Rodney Jerkins, who was acquainted with Mottola, produced two cuts on Irresistible. In an interview with Sony Music Japan, Simpson said that she never met Jerkins in person. He produced and recorded the songs' music and sent the tape to Columbia, from which "Imagination" and "I Never" were selected. Cory Rooney produced Simpson's vocals and Tony Maserati mixed the vocals. Initially, Simpson did not want to record "What's It Gonna Be" as she felt the line "Are you gonna be a dog or a gentleman" was a little awkward. However, due to her record label's persuasion, she recorded the song and ultimately became fond of it. In order to record the title track, Simpson traveled to Murlyn Music Studios, in Sweden. "A Little Bit" was produced by Ric Wake; although he produced many songs for the album, only "A Little Bit" made the final cut. The Japanese version of the album contains a bonus track—the Hex Hector remix of "Irresistible"—for which Simpson re-recorded her vocals.

== Music and lyrics ==
Simpson described Irresistible's material as "Mariah Carey meets Britney Spears ... very mature but accessible to teens." She said that she wanted to blend house, R&B, pop genres into the record. The opening track, "Irresistible", is an R&B song with dance-pop influences. It also exhibits elements of pop rock and funk genres, while incorporating latin rhythms. Aside from including a string section, the track features Simpson's breathy vocals, spoken passages and a mid-section breakdown, where her vocals are "funk-fortified". According to author Ben Graham, the lyrics of the song see Simpson stripping her famous virginity image down. Bob Waliszewski of Plugged In gave a similar observation of the lyrics, writing that they point to an imminent sexual compromise. "A Little Bit" is a dance-pop song following the same beat-oriented pattern as "Irresistible". It features piano instrumentation and Simpson sings the lyrics as rapid-fire verses and with start-and-stop hooks. Simpson again adopts breathy vocals, and the lyrics talk about what she expects from her partner: "A little more time, a little less wait / A little more heart, a little less break". The lyrics also demand healthy changes in her relationship. "Forever in Your Eyes" explores elements of Latin music, as the song is backed by Spanish guitar and infused with hip-hop beats. The lyrics describe a couple in love lying together "all through the night". "There You Were" is a torchy power ballad which drew comparisons to Simpson's previous song "Where You Are" (2000). The lyrics of the song are a homage to the protagonist's partner, who changed her life. The song received negative response from critics, with some calling it "sappy" and "unnecessary". "What's It Gonna Be" is a bubblegum pop song influenced by '80s funk music, which was compared to outtakes from Spears' Oops!... I Did It Again (2000). The lyrics deal with Simpson expecting a reply from her lover regarding his fear of commitment.

"When You Told Me You Loved Me" is another power ballad about love, this time utilizing a spanish guitar. Backed by a full 60 piece orchestra, the song and Simpson's vocals were compared to that of Mariah Carey and Celine Dion. "Hot Like Fire", which received positive reviews from critics, is a funky mid-tempo number. Compared to the likes of Michael Jackson and Destiny's Child, the song begins with a "faux" telephone call between Simpson and her friend; the latter explains that Simpson's boyfriend has been cheating on her. The lyrics, sung with "hard edge vocals" over synth horns, hip-hop beats, and electronica rhythms, demonstrate Simpson's annoyance at being cheated on by her boyfriend. "Imagination" is a song with electronic and R&B influences. Rick de Yampert of The Daytona Beach News-Journal commented that the song contained Stevie Wonder-styled funk music. "To Fall in Love Again" and "For Your Love" are ballads; the former is backed by a 60 piece orchestra, and Peter Marsh of BBC Music noted it "morphs [...] into an R'n'B tinged slow jam." It also contains a jazz breakdown, towards its end. Bob Waliszewski wrote that through the latter, "Simpson pledges devotion to a partner". "I Never", produced by Darkchild, infuses Spanish guitars, and has an "urban" tinge. The song portrays the theme of self-respect, and has Simpson getting rid of her cheating partner. The closing track, the cover of the hymn "His Eye Is on the Sparrow", is backed by a gospel choir and "praises God for watching over His children". Reviewers called it one of the standout tracks from the album. According to Kirsten Koba of PopMatters, Simpson sings it "with a depth and passion that is lacking on the rest of the album."

== Artwork, title and release ==
The album artwork for Irresistible was shot by Alberto Tolot in April 2001. The front sleeve cover shows Simpson, wearing heavy makeup and with blonde hair, dressed in a semi-transparent shirt, raising it a bit to expose her navel. Simpson said "God gave me my body, you know. I'm just doing what I can to make it look good." Later in an interview with the Orlando Sentinel, she said that the album art was "a sign of confidence". However, the cover received negative attention from many critics, including the conservative Christian publication Plugged In, which was a strong supporter of Simpson and her virgin image, and Sweet Kisses. They stated, "If anything, Irresistible copes with temptation by yielding to it which, in conjunction with Simpson's general immodesty, models a dubious sexual ethic." Canadian music magazine Chart also gave a negative response, writing "it takes more than wearing see-through clothes, with airbrushed, non-existent nipples, to show that you have matured." A few critics criticized the art for being digitally edited, while others commented on Simpson's similarity to Spears. The Japanese version of the album has the same front sleeve artwork as that of "Irresistible" single.

The title of the album was tentatively set to be Hot Like Fire, later changed to Imagination, before being confirmed to be Irresistible on March 16, 2001. In the United States, Irresistible was initially slated for release on March 20, 2001. However, due to undisclosed reasons, the release was pushed to June 5, 2001. A listening party was arranged by AOL on June 4, 2001, a day before the album's release date. The album's release was celebrated with a release party at the New York Water Club. Simpson rode down Manhattan's East River on a yacht decorated with banners for the celebration, which included a water ski show, a fireboat spraying water, and fireworks. Simpson said the album's release was a critical moment in her career, one "which could send her to stardom or obscurity." In an interview, she said "I'm right there ready to explode." "Or I could go pfft [sic]. No one could ever hear from me again," she added. In the United Kingdom, Irresistible was released on July 16, 2001, and in Japan on May 25, 2001.

== Promotion ==
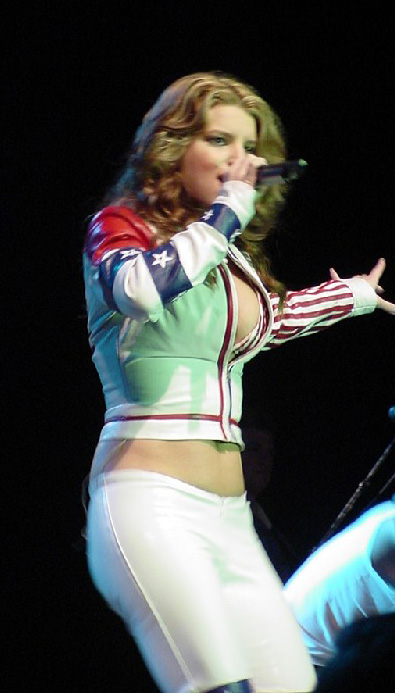
Jessica Simpson performing "I Think I'm in Love with You" on the USO Tour in 2001

As a part of promotion, Simpson performed tracks from the album on several televised appearances and occasions, including Macy's 4th of July Fireworks Spectacular, in celebration of Independence Day, and the 2001 Dick Clark's New Year's Rockin' Eve. In July 2001, she performed the tracks, including "Irresistible" at Wango Tango, an annual all-day concert organized by KIIS-FM, in California. She also toured with Destiny's Child, Nelly, and Eve on MTV's first Total Request Live (TRL) Tour, which spanned thirty dates in the US. In November, she joined the lineup of United Service Organizations' (USO) Tour, to entertain the US troops fighting in Operation Enduring Freedom. The tour, which started in Arlington, Virginia, ventured through the Middle East, including Afghanistan. The next month, she joined the cast of KBKS-FM's Jingle Bell Bash in Seattle. At the event, she performed "Irresistible", "A Little Bit", "I Wanna Love You Forever", and "I Think I'm in Love with You". Simpson also promoted the album through performance at MTV's Spring Break program, held in Cancún, Mexico.

=== DreamChaser Tour ===
Apart from the live performances, Simpson went out on a North America only headlining tour titled the DreamChaser Tour. In contrast to her previous co-headlining tour with 98 Degrees, Simpson wanted "DreamChaser" to present her as a singer and a performer, in the mold of Spears. Simpson decided to make the tour risque by adding more backup dancers and wearing skimpier clothing. She took dance lessons for the tour, as she felt that she had to transform herself into a performer. The tour was set up on a portable stage called the "Extreme Mobile Venue", with a capacity to hold 10,000 people, and ran in mall parking lots. The arena featured a 300 feet (91 m) stadium stage, complete with a sound system and lights. Arrangements for concertgoers to bungee jump, climb a rock wall, and go mechanical surfing while the singer was not performing were also provided. The venue featured interactive games and exhibits, and was supported by a 9-foot (2.7 m)-high ramp for extreme motorcycle riders. The tour openers included Eden's Crush, Youngstown, Toya, and Plus One. It was choreographed by Dan Karaty.

The tour launched on August 7, 2001, at Corpus Christi, Texas, and ran twenty-five dates through mid-September. Tickets price ranged between $29.99 and $39.99. In an interview with Deseret News, Simpson said that it "was a fun tour. That was like a preparation for me. It was one of those things where I just wanted to go out and meet all my fans." A video tape, titled Dream Chaser, was released on January 22, 2002, which included Simpson's biography, music videos, behind-the-scenes looks at "Irresistible" and "A Little Bit", and footage from the tour. The tape reached number twenty-five on Billboard Top Music Videos chart, for the issue dated February 9, 2002.

=== Singles ===
"Irresistible" (2001)
A 19-second sample of "Irresistible" featuring the beat-backed chorus and provocative lyrics.

The lead single from the album, "Irresistible", was released on April 12, 2001, as a CD single. The Associated Press called it "unimaginative". In 2003, the song won a Broadcast Music Incorporated (BMI) "Pop Music Award". "Irresistible" became a moderate commercial success, peaking within the top twenty hit in the United States and the United Kingdom. The song was certified gold by the Australian Recording Industry Association (ARIA). The accompanying music video was directed by Simon Brand, and features Simpson dressed as a spy, trying to compromise some evidence in a laboratory.

"A Little Bit" was released as the second single, on August 28, 2001. The song was used to promote Bally Total Fitness and thus, a limited CD single pressing was made available to people who joined the club. The song only managed to reach number sixty-two on the Australian Singles Chart. A music video, directed by Hype Williams, features Simpson dancing in a futuristic spaceship-like setting, with her backup dancers. A third single was planned to be released, but after September 11 terrorist attacks, Sony refused to promote a third single, which Joe Simpson believed critical for Jessica's prospects. In an interview in 2004 he said: "When those planes crashed into those buildings, it nearly demolished our career." Later, in an interview in 2003, Simpson said after the title track peaked at number 15 on Billboard Hot 100, "they just dropped the whole thing." "When You Told Me You Loved Me" was released as a promotional single in Brazil. The single however charted and peaked at number 192 on the South Korean Download Chart.

== Critical reception ==
Professional ratings
Review scores
Source	Rating
AllMusic	2.5/5 stars
The Daily News	2.5/5 stars
The Dallas Morning News	C
Entertainment Weekly	D
New York Post	2.5/4 stars
Rolling Stone	1.5/5 stars
Slant Magazine	2/5 stars

Upon release, Irresistible received mixed reviews by music critics who said the album sounded generic and over-produced. Chuck Campbell of Daily News gave the album a rating of 2.5 out of 5. He said the album was "nothing but a footnote", and remarked that the songs sounded too similar to works by Spears and Aguilera. He concluded by commenting on Simpson's version of "His Eye Is on the Sparrow": "So if her pop fortunes fail, perhaps she'll find some contemporary Christian singers to imitate." Teresa Gubbins of The Dallas Morning News wrote that it "doesn't do much to set her apart. It's likable but definitely not distinctive – just another formulaic entry into the already saturated teen-pop field." She gave the album a grade of C.

David Browne of Entertainment Weekly gave the album a D and said that it "should have been called 'Relentless'. Exploiting every cliché in the pop 2001 handbook – florid ballads seemingly formulated for movie soundtracks [...] it quite literally hits you baby, and more than one time." Although he gave Simpson credit for being able to sing, he said that she did it in a "talent show manner". Kirsten Koba of Popmatters commented that "Irresistible is more reminiscent of trips to the dentist's office, or any equally oppressive place that only plays adult contemporary schlock." Barry Walters of Rolling Stone wrote that except "Hot Like Fire", every other track on Irresistible needed remixing. He concluded by saying, "With so many teen-pop choices, this prom-queen cyborg remains redundant and reactionary." Sal Cinquemani of Slant called the album a "lackluster sophomore" effort. He commented that there was no "original note" on the album and compared the tracks to those by Spears.

AllMusic critic Stephen Thomas Erlewine graded the album 2.5 stars out of 5, and commented that the album was "filled with frothy, sugary pop tunes." He said that, apart from the title track and "A Little Bit", none of the songs "register as songs – they're just stylish background music." He concluded by commenting, "it's a bit of the inverse of Sweet Kisses, which was too heavy on ballads, and, like that record, this is the work of pros, so it sounds fine as it plays but it lacks a song as strong as 'I Think I'm in Love With You' to anchor it – so it floats away from memory." Peter Marsh of the BBC said the album sounded like a mixture of Spears, Aguilera, Carey and Dion, and wrote that it covered all the "bases". Larry Printz of The Morning Call called the album "pleasant, palatable modern pop." He wrote that the album was "clearly the best of the lot", and commended Simpson's vocals. Chuck Taylor of Billboard described "What's It Gonna Be" like "another bid for chart domination". He viewed the album as "a great step forward for youth pop and sure footing for [this] glamorous talent." Dotmusic felt that the album was going to "confirm her position among pop's elite" and that "If you like a hearty mixture of pop, r&b; and a dash of gospel then this album is for you".

== Accolades ==
Year	Nominated work	Category	Award/publication	Result	Ref.
2003	Irresistible	Pop Music Award	BMI Awards	Won	
2002	Irresistible	Best Album	Radio Disney Music Awards	Nominated	
2001	Irresistible	Choice Love Song	Teen Choice Awards	Nominated	
2001	Irresistible	Choice Song of the Summer	Teen Choice Awards	Nominated	

== Commercial performance ==
In the United States, Irresistible debuted at number six on the Billboard 200, the week dated June 23, 2001. It sold 120,000 copies in its first week, a major improvement over Sweet Kisses, which sold just 65,000 copies in its first week. However, the album dropped to number twelve the following week, before falling to number twenty-five the week after. The album stayed on the charts for just sixteen weeks, and was ranked at number 171 on the Billboard 200-year-end albums chart. It was certified gold by the Recording Industry Association of America (RIAA) for shipments of 500,000 copies in the country, and as of February 2009, Irresistible has sold 755,000 copies in the US. In Canada, Irresistible debuted at number fifteen on the Canadian Albums Chart for the week dated June 23, 2001. It ascended to its peak of number thirteen the following week before dropping out of the top twenty the week after. The album stayed on the chart for 17 weeks. Irresistible was certified gold by the Canadian Recording Industry Association (CRIA) in April 2005, for shipments of 50,000 units.

Overseas, in Australia, the album debuted at number eighty-one on the ARIA Albums Chart, in the issue dated September 17, 2001. It dropped out of the chart the next week. Similarly, Irresistible debuted at number seventy-five on the Austrian Albums Chart, the week of August 5, 2001. It rose to its peak position of number fifty-eight the next week. In Switzerland, the album debuted at number twenty, the week dated July 8, 2001. After attaining its peak position of number fifteen, it dropped to number sixteen. The album stayed on the charts for a total of ten weeks, including one re-entry at number ninety-five on September 16, 2001. In Japan, Irresistible debuted at number twenty-five on the Oricon Albums Chart, with sales of 9,560 copies. The following week, it ascended to number twenty-four with additional sales of 12,430 units. The album stayed in the top 100 for six weeks, and according to Oricon, has sold 44,580 copies in Japan. In the United Kingdom, Irresistible peaked at a position of number 103. The album saw moderate success in Germany, where it peaked at number thirty-four, and stayed on the chart for three weeks. To date, the album has sold 2 million copies worldwide.

== Track listing ==
Irresistible — Standard edition
No.	Title	Writer(s)	Producer(s)	Length
1.	"Irresistible"	Anders Bagge; Arnthor Birgisson; Pamela Sheyne	Bagge; Birgisson	3:13
2.	"A Little Bit"	Kara DioGuardi; Steve Morales; David Siegel	Morales; Ric Wake	3:47
3.	"Forever in Your Eyes"	Nick Lachey; Rhett Lawrence	Lawrence	3:38
4.	"There You Were" (with Marc Anthony)	Louis Biancaniello; Sam Watters; Ty Lacy	Biancaniello; Watters	4:25
5.	"What's It Gonna Be"	Kandice Love; Troy Oliver	Cory Rooney; Oliver; Wake	4:41
6.	"When You Told Me You Loved Me"	Walter Afanasieff; Billy Mann	Afanasieff	3:48
7.	"Hot Like Fire"	Rooney	Rooney	4:17
8.	"Imagination"	Fred Jerkins III; LaShawn Daniels; Mischke; Rodney Jerkins	Jerkins	4:25
9.	"To Fall in Love Again"	Lachey; Afanasieff	Afanasieff	4:57
10.	"For Your Love"	Biancaniello; Watters	Biancaniello; Watters	4:20
11.	"I Never"	Jerkins III; Daniels; Jerkins; Mischke	Jerkins	4:34
12.	"His Eye Is on the Sparrow"	Charles Hutchison Gabriel; Civilla Durfee Martin	Rooney	4:37
Total length:				50:43

Irresistible — Japanese edition (bonus track)
No.	Title	Writer(s)	Producer(s)	Length
13.	"Irresistible" (Hex Hector Radio Mix)	Bagge; Birgisson; Sheyne	Hector	3:32
Total length:				54:15

== Personnel ==
Credits adapted from Irresistible liner notes.

Musicians

- Walter Afanasieff – Drums, Keyboards
- Janie Barnett – Background vocals
- Bernard Belle – Bass guitar
- Marcelo Berestovoy – Guitar
- Mats Berntoft – Guitar
- Louis Biancaniello – Keyboards
- Greg Bieck – Keyboards
- Melonie Daniels – Background vocals
- Loren Dawson – Keyboards
- Margaret Dorn – Background vocals
- Sharlotte Gibson – Background vocals
- Richie Jones – Drums, Percussion
- Kandice Love – Background vocals
- Chieli Minucci – Guitar
- Troy Oliver – Keyboards
- RL – Guitar
- Corey Rooney – Keyboards
- Ira Segal – Guitar
- Stockholm Session Orchestra – Strings
- Sam Watters – Background vocals

Production

- Walter Afanasieff – Arranger, producer, Programming
- Anders Bagge – Writer, producer, mixer
- Jeff Bender – Photography
- Tom Bender – Mixing
- Louis Biancaniello – Arranger, Engineer, producer, Programming
- Greg Bieck – Drum programming, Engineer, Programming
- Arnthor Birgisson – Writer, producer
- Jason Bonilla – Engineer, Programming
- Larry Brooks – Assistant engineer, Engineer
- Jim Caruana – Engineer
- Will Catterson – Engineer
- LaShawn Daniels – Engineer
- Loren Dawson – Arranger
- Matthew Dellapolla – Scoring consultant
- Paul Foley – Engineer
- David Gleeson – Engineer
- Mick Guzauski – Mixing
- Dan Hetzel – Engineer, Mixing, Mixing engineer
- Jim Janick – Engineer
- Ron Jaramillo – Art direction, Design
- Ted Jensen – Mastering
- Fred Jerkins – Writer
- Rodney Jerkins – Writer, Compositor, arranger, Engineer, producer
- Richie Jones – Arranger, Mixing, Programming
- Matt Kormondy – Production assistant
- Pete Krawiec – Engineer
- Eric Kupper – Keyboard programming
- Nick Lachey – Writer
- Rhett Lawrence – Arranger, producer
- Bob Ludwig – Mastering
- Michael McCoy – Assistant engineer
- Steve MacMillan – Engineer
- Glen Marchese – Engineer
- Nick Marshall – Assistant engineer
- Ron Martinez – Vocal engineer
- Tony Maserati – Mixing
- Mischke – Writer
- Joanie Morris – Production coordination
- Troy Oliver – Keyboard programming
- Adam Olmsted – Assistant engineer, Engineer
- Ken Pavés – Hair stylist
- Debbie Datz-Pyle – Consultant
- Dave Reitzas – Engineer
- RL – Drum programming, Engineer, Mixing, Programming
- Corey Rooney – Arranger, Drum programming, executive producer, producer, Vocal producer
- William Ross – Arranger, Conductor
- Mark Russell – Assistant, Production coordination
- Pamela Sheyne – Writer
- David Swope – Assistant engineer, Engineer
- Alberto Tolot – Photography
- Francesca Tolot – Make-Up
- Ric Wake – Arranger, producer
- Sam Watters – Arranger, Engineer, producer

== Recording locations ==
Adapted from Irresistible liner notes.

- Cove City Sound Studios (Glen Cove, New York)
- The Hit Factory (New York City)
- Homesite 13 (Novato, California)
- Lobo Recording Studios (Deer Park, New York)
- Murlyn Studios (Stockholm, Sweden)
- The Record Plant (Los Angeles)
- Sony Music Studios (New York City)
- Sony Scoring Stage (Culver City, California)
- Sound Gallery Studios (Los Angeles)
- Cello Studios (Hollywood)
- WallyWorld Studios (California)

== Charts ==
=== Weekly charts ===
Chart (2001)	Peak position
Australian Albums (ARIA)	81
Austrian Albums (Ö3 Austria)	58
Canadian Albums (Billboard)	13
European Top 100 Albums (Music & Media)	93
German Albums (Offizielle Top 100)	34
Japanese Albums (Oricon)	24
Quebec (ADISQ)	29
South Korean Albums (RIAK)	18
Swiss Albums (Schweizer Hitparade)	15
UK Albums (OCC)	103
US Billboard 200	6

=== Year-end charts ===
Year-end chart performance for Irresistible by Jessica Simpson
Chart (2001)	Position
Canadian Albums (Nielsen SoundScan)	180
South Korean Albums (RIAK)	64
US Billboard 200	171

== Certifications and sales ==
Region	Certification	Certified units/sales
Canada (Music Canada)	Gold	50,000^{^}
Japan (RIAJ)	Gold	100,000
Singapore	—	2,000
South Korea	—	6,821
United States (RIAA)	Gold	755,000
Summaries
Worldwide	—	2,000,000
^{^} Shipments figures based on certification alone.

== Bibliography ==
- Dougherty, Terri (2004), People in the News: Jessica Simpson and Nick Lachey, San Diego: Lucent Books, ISBN 1-59018-721-0
