= Bini & Martini =

Bini & Martini were a duo composed of house music producers and DJs Gianni Bini and Paolo Martini (both born 28 November 1974), from Italy. They are known under a variety of pseudonyms, including House of Glass, Eclipse, The Goodfellas and The Groovelines.

== Career ==
Paolo Martini became a professional DJ in 1985 in the Venice area and started producing music in 1992 for a number of projects released by the Underground Music Movement (UMM) label. He also hosted a TV program on Italian television in 1992. Gianni Bini began producing in 1990, and the following year started a production team named Fathers Of Sound with Fulvio Perniola. Cambogia rossa

Bini and Martini met at UMM in 1996 and started producing tracks under the name House Of Glass, also founding the label Ocean Trax. Many of their tracks are released by British label Azuli Records. Their best known release is "Makes Me Love You", a rework of Sister Sledge's "Thinking Of You", released under the name Eclipse, that reached #25 in the UK Singles Chart in 1999.

== Discography ==
=== Bini & Martini ===
- 1998 "Dancing With You" (with Romina Johnson)
- 2000 "Happiness" (with Melonie Daniels, Schon-Jomel Crawford and Eric Kupper) UK #53
- 2001 "Burning Up" UK #65
- 2002 "Say Yes" (with Su Su Bobien) UK #80
- 2004 "Dance (Disco Heat)" (with Memi P.)
- 2006 "Stop"
- 2007 "Low Frequencies" (with Lorenzo Giannechinni)
- 2008 "Baby Bumps EP"

=== House of Glass ===
- 1996 "Take Me Over" (with Fulvio Perniola and Judy Albanese) Hot Dance Club Play #36
- 1996 "Love's Here At Last" (with Judy Albanese)
- 1998 "Playin' With My Mind" (Pepper Mashay)
- 2000 "Disco Down" (with Giorgio Giordano and Pepper Mashay) UK #72
- 2003 "Freakin'" (with Deanna Della Cioppa)
- 2007 "Stone Fox Chase"
- 2008 "Disco Down 2008" (with Giorgio Giordano and Pepper Mashay)

=== Eclipse ===
- 1999 "Makes Me Love You" UK #25
- 2002 "The Music" (with Deanna Della Cioppa)
- 2003 "Take Me Down (6 Underground)" (with Deanna Della Cioppa)
- 2004 "For Your Love" (with Michelle Weeks)

=== The Groovelines ===
- 1998 "Got To Dance Disco" (with Fulvio Perniola and Weston Foster) Hot Dance Club Play #3
- 2000 "Tonite" (with Weston Foster)
- 2004 "Look Ahead"
- 2006 "Every Woman"

=== Other aliases ===
- 1998 "Right Back To Love", as Subsystem (with Neri & Baroni and Pepper Mashay)
- 1999 "Can't Give Her Up", as Wes Jay Project (with Gibo Rosin)
- 2000 "Soul Heaven", as The Goodfellas (with Pasta Boys and Lisa Millet) UK #27 Hot Dance Club Play #13
- 2000 "The Best Of Me", as Subsystem (with Neri & Baroni and Lisa Millet)
- 2000 "Power Flower EP", as Power Flower (with DFC Team)
- 2001 "All Night", as The Goodfellas (with Pasta Boys and Deanna Della Cioppa)
- 2001 "Power Flower EP Vol. 2", as Power Flower

=== Production for other artists ===
- 1997 Jane Roberts - "Do Whatcha Feel" (with Marco Ossanna)
- 2000 Romina Johnson feat. Luci Martin and Norma Jean Wright - "My Forbidden Lover"
- 2001 High Society feat. Taka Boom - "Pick Me Up (And I'll Dance)"
- 2001 East Town feat. Deanna - "Come To Me"
