= Su Su Bobien =

American singer (born 1970)

- Born: Roni Suzette Montgomery; November 4, 1970 (age 55); Newark, New Jersey, United States
- Genres: Gospel, jazz, house, dance
- Occupations: Singer, songwriter, arranger
- Instrument: 5-Octave contralto vocals
- Years active: 1991–present

Su Su Bobien (born Suzette Montgomery on November 4, 1970) is an American gospel and house music vocalist. She lives in Newark, New Jersey. She has performed with the Harlem Gospel Choir.

== Career ==
Bobien rose to fame on the domestic and international house music scene with her 1999 hit, "You Don't Know" (1999), which remained on the DJ Play list for weeks. It had already been on the Billboard charts for six weeks by December 1998. She has established herself as one of the signature voices in gospel house music. Bobien has been inspired by many artists such as Tina Turner. Other inspirations include the Clark Sisters, Chaka Khan and Patti LaBelle.

== Discography ==
=== Praise and Worship music ===
| Song | Producer | Project and Release Date |
|---|---|---|
| I Feel Your Spirit" | Donald Lawrence | Azuza Next Generation" released (2013) |
| I Want To Say Thank You" | Reverend Milton Biggham | Georgia Mass Choir (2011) |
| Triumph (Already Done" | Clarence Singleton | Hezekiah Walker" released (2009) |
| He's Able" | Donald Lawrence | Hezekiah Walker" released (2008) |
| BreakThrough" | J Moss | Azuza Next Generation" released (2009) |

=== Early gospel music features ===
| Song | Producer | Project and Release Date |
|---|---|---|
| Because He Loves Me" | Alvin Darling | Alvin Darling & Celebration" released (1995). |
| God Can" | Rev Milton Biggham | Bishop Jeff Banks & Revival Temple Mass Choir" released (1989). |
| Search is Over" | Rev Milton Biggham | Bishop Jeff Banks & Revival Temple Mass Choir" released (1989). |
| I've Been Born Again" | Alvin Darling | Alvin Darling & Celebration" released (1989). |

=== DJ/Producer house mixes vocal credits ===
| Producer/DJ | Track title | Song | Credits/Label | Release date |
|---|---|---|---|---|
| | You Got It (Tuff Jam Remixes) (12", W/Lbl, TP) | Su Su Bobien | Azuli Records | |
| Akri Jr. | For All U Do (Akri Jr. Funky Mix) For All U Do (Akri Jr. Funky Mix) | Soulstar Syndicate, Susu Bobien | Musica Diaz / Senorita | May 27, 2011 |
| Beginerz | Say Yes feat. Susu Bobien (Beginerz Remix) | Martini, Bini, Susu Bobien | PMI Dance PMI Dance | June 19, 2012 |
| Claudio Di Carlo | For All U Do (Claudio Di Carlo Classic Mix) | Soulstar Syndicate, Susu Bobien | Peppermint Jam | June 21, 2013 |
| Claudio Di Carlo | For All U Do (Claudio Di Carlo Classic Mix) | Soulstar Syndicate, Susu Bobien | Peppermint Jam | October 9, 2012 |
| Claudio Di Carlo | For All U Do (Claudio Di Carlo Classic Mix) | Soulstar Syndicate, Susu Bobien | Musica Diaz / Senorita | February 9, 2011 |
| Claudio Di Carlo | For All U Do (Claudio Di Carlo Classic Mix) | Soulstar Syndicate, Susu Bobien | Musica Diaz / Senorita | December 8, 2011 |
| David Penn | ☢ | Danny Clark, Jay Benham, Susu Bobien Danny Clark, Jay Benham, Susu Bobien | Azuli Back Catalog | May 15, 2012 |
| DJ Rork | Praise Always (DJ Rork Remix) | Susu Bobien | Gotta Keep Faith | August 5, 2011 |
| Eric Kupper | Keep It To Myself (Eric Kupper Chapel Dub) Keep It To Myself (Eric Kupper Chapel Dub) | Susu Bobien Susu Bobien | Soundmen On Wax Soundmen On Wax | August 30, 2011 |
| Eric Kupper | Keep It To Myself (Eric Kupper Classic Pump Mix) | Susu Bobien | Soundmen On Wax | July 19, 2011 |
| Fanatix | More Than Enough (Fanatix Mix) | Danny Clark, Jay Benham, Susu Bobien | Solid Ground | June 26, 2012 |
| Fanatix | More Than Enough (Fanatix Mix) | Danny Clark, Jay Benham, Susu Bobien | Solid Ground | December 20, 2011 |
| Gregory del Piero | Praise Always (Gregory Del Piero's Grace Remix) | Susu Bobien | Gotta Keep Faith | August 5, 2011 |
| Izzy Stardust | For All U Do (Izzy Stardust Remix) | Soulstar Syndicate, Susu Bobien | Musica Diaz / Senorita | October 28, 2011 |
| Jay's Workout | More Than Enough (Jay's Workout) | Danny Clark, Jay Benham, Susu Bobien | Solid Ground | December 20, 2011 |
| Jorge Martin S. | For All U Do (Jorge Martin S Remix) | Soulstar Syndicate, Susu Bobien | Musica Diaz / Senorita Musica Diaz / Senorita | November 25, 2011 |
| Manjits | All I Want To Do (Manjits Main Mix) | Susu Bobien | Soundmen On Wax | March 19, 2013 |
| Mr. Fuzz | Praise Always (Mr. Fuzz Praise Soulful Vocal Remix) | Susu Bobien | Gotta Keep Faith | August 5, 2011 |
| Ron Carroll | Set Free (Ron Carroll Vocal Mix) | Susu Bobien | Soundmen On Wax | July 19, 2011 |
| Sean McCabe | More Than Enough (Sean Mccabe Classic Mix) | Danny Clark, Jay Benham, Susu Bobien | Solid Ground | November 9, 2012 |
| Sean McCabe | More Than Enough (Sean Mccabe Classic Mix) | Danny Clark, Jay Benham, Susu Bobien | Solid Ground | December 20, 2011 |
| Sean McCabe, Deli-G | Set Free (Sean McCabe & Deli-G Touch Vocal) | Susu Bobien | Soundmen On Wax | August 30, 2011 |
| Sterling Ensemble | You Brought Me Brighter Days (Sterling Ensemble Mix) | Susu Bobien | Soundmen On Wax | August 30, 2011 |
| Steve Paradise | Praise Always (Steve Paradise Soulful Remix) | Susu Bobien | Gotta Keep Faith | August 5, 2011 |
| Wally Lopez | Say Yes feat. Susu Bobien (Wally Lopez Remix) | Martini, Bini, Susu Bobien | PMI Dance PMI Dance | April 17, 2012 |
| Wally Lopez | Say Yes feat. Susu Bobien (Wally Lopez Remix) | Martini, Bini, Susu Bobien | Bonzai Progressive | November 29, 2011 |
| | ☢ | Diva Down Entertainment, Susu Bobien | Gotta Keep Faith | December 28, 2012 |
| | More Than Enough (Original Mix) | Danny Clark, Jay Benham, Susu Bobien | Solid Ground | December 20, 2011 |
| | Running (Original Mix) | Susu Bobien | Nervous Records | December 20, 2011 |
| | More Than Enough (Original Mix) | Danny Clark, Jay Benham, Susu Bobien | Solid Ground | December 12, 2011 |
| | More Than Enough (Original Mix) | Danny Clark, Jay Benham, Susu Bobien | Solid Ground | November 12, 2011 |
| | Runnin' (Original Mix) | Susu Bobien | Nervous Records | September 20, 2011 |
| | For All U Do (Original Mix) | Soulstar Syndicate, Susu Bobien | Musica Diaz / Senorita | August 19, 2011 |
| | For All U Do (Original Mix) | Soulstar Syndicate, Susu Bobien | Catwalk Records | July 7, 2011 |
| Andrew Hartley | Survivor (Rhemi Remix) | Survivor | Rejoice Records | July 14, 2015 |
