= Sweetest Sin =

Single by Jessica Simpson

from the album In This Skin
- B-side: "In This Skin"
- Released: July 14, 2003
- Studio: Sony Music Studios (New York, NY); Cove City Sound Studios (Glen Cove, NY); Record Plant (Los Angeles, CA)
- Genre: R&B, pop
- Length: 3:14
- Label: Columbia
- Songwriter: Diane Warren
- Producer: Ric Wake

Jessica Simpson singles chronology
"A Little Bit" (2001)	"Sweetest Sin" (2003)	"With You" (2003)

Music video
- "Sweetest Sin" on YouTube

"Sweetest Sin" is a song by American singer Jessica Simpson. It was written by Diane Warren and produced by Ric Wake for Simpson's third studio album, In This Skin (2003). It was released as the album's first single on July 14, 2003 through Columbia Records. The R&B song, speaks about what would be the sweetest sin between a couple. "Sweetest Sin" received positive reviews from critics. Simpson performed the song on her Reality Tour Live (2004). An accompanying music video, directed by Constantine Paraskavopoulos, showed Simpson swaying on a beach and flirting with singer Nick Lachey during the whole video.

== Background and composition ==
"Sweetest Sin"
18 second sample from the mid-tempo ballad written by Diane Warren.

"Sweetest Sin" was written by Diane Warren and produced by Ric Wake. According to the sheetmusic published at Music Notes by Real Songs (ASCAP), the R&B song is composed in the key of D major and is set in the time signature of common time with a tempo of 95 beats per minute. It has the sequence of C–D–B♭ as its chord progression. Simpson's vocals in the song span from the note of D_{4} to the high note of F_{5}.

The recording process of "Sweetest Sin" was documented in an episode of Simpson's reality series, Newlyweds: Nick and Jessica. Simpson originally recorded "Sweetest Sin" confidentially in a slightly remixed form and announced she was pleased with its progress. However, her superiors at Columbia Records told her that she had made the song too "challenging"; in essence, they felt that potential listeners of the song would be alienated by singing they would not be able to duplicate. Simpson was filmed breaking into tears when she received the news. Later, she re-recorded her vocals with the assistance of her then-husband, Nick Lachey, whom she brought along because she felt he was a good vocal producer.

== Reception ==
Sal Cinquemani of Slant Magazine said, "[Sweetest Sin], the catchy tune, penned by Diane Warren, is a glossy, ever-so-slightly over-produced affair." Clem Bastow of Stylus Magazine noticed the song "is concerned with 'a picture of perfection... your skin upon my skin'." Abbey Goodman of MTV said Simpson "maintains the good-girl image that made her popular" with the song. The song was also a Track Pick from the AllMusic review of In This Skin by Stephen Thomas Erlewine, along with "Be", "I Have Loved You" and "With You". On August 9, 2003, the song debuted at number forty on Billboard Pop Songs, reaching number thirty-seven two weeks later.

== Music video and live performances ==
The music video, directed by Dean Paraskavopoulos, starts with black-and-white shots of Simpson dancing and looking at viewers. It cuts to Simpson swaying on a beach, and embracing Nick Lachey underneath a waterfall on the beach. Further scenes are presented, such as one in which Simpson lies on a bed by herself. The video continues with intercut footage of the previous scenes, until the final seconds of the song, when Simpson is joined by her husband, in which they move on their bed on the beach. The video ends when Lachey disappears, leaving the singer alone.

On August 12, 2003, Simpson performed the song on Miss Teen USA 2003 and on August 19, 2003 on the American music show TRL and on The Late Late Show with Craig Kilborn. She also performed the single on Good Morning America on August 22, 2003. The song was also performed on 2004's Reality Tour Live. Simpson performed "Sweetest Sin" live at the Trump Taj Mahal in Atlantic City, New Jersey. The performance, dedicated to Lachey, was recorded and later broadcast on the second season of Newlyweds: Nick and Jessica.

== Track listings ==
- CD single
1. "Sweetest Sin" (single version) – 3:04
2. "In This Skin" – 4:19
- DVD single
1. "With You" (music video) – 3:12
2. "Sweetest Sin" (music video) – 3:02
- Junior Vasquez Remixes
1. "Sweetest Sin" (Junior's Original Sin) – 9:39
2. "Sweetest Sin" (Junior's Tribapella) – 8:56
3. "Sweetest Sin" (Junior's World Mixshow Version) – 6:33

== Charts ==
Chart (2003)	Peak position
US Pop Songs (Billboard)	37

== Release history ==
Release dates and formats for "Sweetest Sin"
Region	Date	Format	Label	Ref.
United States	July 14, 2003	Contemporary hit radio	Columbia	
United States	July 22, 2003	CD	Columbia	
