= A Little Bit =

2001 single by Jessica Simpson

Single by Jessica Simpson

from the album Irresistible
- Released: August 28, 2001
- Studio: Sony Music (New York City)
- Genre: Dance-pop
- Length: 3:47
- Label: Columbia
- Songwriters: Kara DioGuardi, Steve Morales, David Siegel
- Producers: Steve Morales, Ric Wake

Jessica Simpson singles chronology
"Irresistible" (2001)	"A Little Bit" (2001)	"Sweetest Sin" (2003)

Music video
- "A Little Bit" on YouTube

"A Little Bit" is a song recorded by American recording artist Jessica Simpson. It was written by Kara DioGuardi, Steve Morales and David Siegel, and was produced by Morales along with Ric Wake. The song was released as the second and final single from Simpson's second studio album Irresistible (2001), on August 28, 2001, through Columbia Records. Musically, the song is a mid-tempo dance-pop song and the lyrics speak about the protagonist wanting changes in a relationship she is in.

The song received mostly positive reviews from music critics; most of them appreciated the song's production. It failed to chart in the United States, but reached number sixty-two on Australian Singles Chart. An accompanying music video, directed by Hype Williams, shows Simpson dancing on a futuristic dance floor, along with her backup dancers. Simpson performed the song on her DreamChaser Tour (2001), the 2001 Jingle Bell Bash and a few televised shows.

"A Little Bit" was covered by Welsh singer Rosie Ribbons in 2003 for her unreleased album Misbehaving. Her version was released as a single through Telstar Records and peaked at number nineteen on the UK Singles Chart. The single was promoted through a promotional music video, which shows Ribbons performing dance routines with her dancers, and live performances on various televised appearances like CD:UK, Top of the Pops and Smile.

== Background and composition ==
Jessica Simpson "A Little Bit" (2001)
A sample of "A Little Bit". The song is a dance-pop song, where Simpson adopts breathy vocals.

"A Little Bit" was written by Kara DioGuardi, Steve Morales and David Siegal, and was produced by Morales and Ric Wake. The song became DioGuardi's first writing credit for an artist from her native country. Jessica Simpson's vocals were recorded by Dan Hetzel at Sony Music Studios, New York City, and the track was mixed by Hetzel along with Richie Jones at Cove City Sound Studios, Glen Cove, New York. Keyboard programming was done by Eric Kupper. According to Simpson, "the message behind the song is for guys to listen to the girl". "A guy needs to give a little bit more of himself, a little bit more of his time. It's about the love going so much further, the guy would actually be selfless," she expanded on the song's theme. In the United States, "A Little Bit" was released as the second single from Irresistible. The song saw an airplay-only release there on August 28, 2001, while in Australia, a physical single was issued on October 29, 2001. "A Little Bit" was used to promote Bally Total Fitness and thus, a limited CD single pressing was made available to people who joined the club. The song was also utilized for the company's promotional advertisement campaign.

"A Little Bit" is a dance-pop song, composed in a "medium pop" tempo. According to the sheet music published at Musicnotes.com by Alfred Music Publishing, it is written in the key of E minor. Its beat is set in common time, and moves at a tempo of 94 beats per minute. It also has the sequence of Em–C–B/D♯ as its chord progression. Simpson's voice in the song spans from the note of G_{3} to the high note of D_{5}. Following the same beat-oriented pattern as "Irresistible", "A Little Bit" features piano instrumentation. Simpson sings the lyrics as rapid-fire verses and with start-and-stop hooks. Simpson adopts breathy vocals for the song, and the lyrics talk about what she expects from her partner: "A little more time, a little less wait / A little more heart, a little less break". She also demands healthy changes in the relationship.

== Critical reception ==
"A Little Bit" garnered mostly positive reviews from music critics. Kirsten Koba of PopMatters gave a positive review, writing "with pop star sass, she belts out [...] proving that she's a girl with attitude — and fierce rhyming ability." Stephen Thomas Erlewine of AllMusic wrote that the song and "Irresistible" were "double-punch" on the album. Chuck Taylor of Billboard praised the song's production, writing that it "locks [this one] inside the head long after it's faded from the speakers." Larry Printz of The Morning Call also gave a favorable review, writing that the song "benefit[s]" from the start-and-stop hooks. Yushaimi Yahya of The Malay Mail, who was critical of the album as a whole, pointed out that Simpson sounded "decent" on the track. However, Chuck Campbell of The Daily News noted Simpson's singing as "breathless whispers" and deemed the song as being "heavily processed." The song debuted at number sixty-two on the Australian Singles Chart, on the week dated November 5, 2001, which became its peak position. The single fell to number ninety-six the following week, and dropped out of the chart the week after.

== Promotion ==
=== Music video ===
The music video was filmed under the direction of Hype Williams to promote the single. The dance sequence was choreographed by George Hubela (known as GEO) and the video takes place in a futuristic spaceship-like setting where Simpson performs an intricate dance choreography with four male and four female dancers. She wears a rainbow-colored tank top and a mini skirt in the video. At one part, the dancers perform in pairs with Simpson in front of them. Later, Simpson dances beside a male dancer while wearing sunglasses and a white top with a bedazzled American flag. In the video's final scene, Simpson, accompanied by the same dancers from the beginning, perform choreography in a red room, and dance with futuristic pole-stands. The music video also features her younger sister Ashlee Simpson as one of the background dancers.

=== Live performances ===
Simpson included the song on the set-list of her DreamChaser Tour (2001). For the performance on the tour, Simpson was accented by a white top and plaid pants, and also wore a red hat and a red tie. Her performance also made use of poles similar to the one used in music video. She also performed the song on MuchMusic Canada. and the sketch comedy show MADtv. The song was performed along with "Irresistible", "I Wanna Love You Forever", and "I Think I'm in Love with You", at the Jingle Bell Bash, organized by KBKS-FM, in December 2001. The same month, she sang the song on the 2001 Dick Clark's New Year's Rockin' Eve, along with "Irresistible", and on the Hot 107.9 Mistletoe Meltdown. Mark Bialczak of The Post-Standard wrote that Simpson "sure sounded like a diva – especially with the bulked-up tape track that accompanied her singing."

== Track listing ==
- Australian CD single
1. "A Little Bit" – 3:47
2. "A Little Bit" (Chris 'The Greek' & Guido Club Mix) – 7:54
3. "A Little Bit" (Chris 'The Greek' & Guido Radio Mix) – 4:29
4. "Irresistible" (Hex Hector Radio Mix) – 3:32

== Personnel ==
Personnel for "A Little Bit" are adapted from the Irresistible liner notes. Credits for the remixes are adapted from "A Little Bit" CD single liner notes.

- Steve Morales – writing, co-production
- Kara DioGuardi – writing, background vocals
- David Siegel – writing
- Ric Wake – production
- Janie Barnett – background vocals
- Margaret Dorn – background vocals
- Ted Jensen – mastering
- Jessica Simpson – vocals
- Chieli Minucci – guitar
- Dan Hetzel – engineering
- Richie Jones – mixing, percussion

Remix credits

- Chris "The Greek" Panaghi – remixing
- Guido Osorio – remixing

== Charts ==
2001 weekly chart performance for "A Little Bit"
Chart (2001)	Peak position
Australia (ARIA)	62
Netherlands (Dutch Top 40 Tipparade)	15
Poland (Polish Singles Chart)	21
US CHR/Pop Top 50 (Radio & Records)	36

2025 weekly chart performance for "A Little Bit"
Chart (2025)	Peak position
Russia Streaming (TopHit)	100

== Release history ==
Release dates and formats for "A Little Bit"
Region	Date	Format(s)	Label(s)	Ref(s).
United States	August 28, 2001	Rhythmic contemporary radio	Columbia	
Australia	October 29, 2001	CD	Columbia	

== Rosie Ribbons version ==
"A Little Bit"

Single by Rosie Ribbons

from the album Misbehaving
- Released: January 13, 2003
- Genre: Pop, R&B
- Length: 3:44
- Label: Telstar
- Songwriters: Kara DioGuardi, Steve Morales, David Siegel
- Producer: ICON

Rosie Ribbons singles chronology
"Blink" (2002)	"A Little Bit" (2003)	"Good Thing" (2003)

"A Little Bit" was recorded by Welsh singer and Pop Idol contestant Rosie Ribbons, for her debut studio album Misbehaving. Her version has an "American vibe" and derives from the genres of pop and R&B. A writer for the Western Mail noted that the song contains influences of Samantha Mumba tracks. The song was released on January 13, 2003, through Telstar Records, as the second single from the album. It reached number nineteen on the UK Singles Chart, and was also accompanied by a music video, which showed Ribbons dancing with her backup dancers. She performed the song on various televised appearances such as CD:UK and Top of the Pops. She also toured with Liberty X and promoted the song.

=== Release and reception ===
Ribbons' version of "A Little Bit" was released as the second single from her debut album titled Misbehaving, on January 13, 2003, through Telstar Records. The album was recorded, but due to Telstar going bankrupt, it was never released.

The song earned mixed reviews from critics. A staff of Tourdates.co.uk gave a favorable review commending Ribbons' vocal display. The reviewer added "[so] often we are bombarded with wannabes with weak vocals and insipid songs, [Rosie] shows us that there is life after pop idol and with 'a little bit' of cred." Music Week also gave a positive review, noting the song was "catchy". However, Ian Hyland, writing for the Sunday Mirror was critical of the song, giving it a grade of 6 out of 10. He remarked that Ribbons "fails" at doing "sexy R'n'B". Similarly, Julie MacCaskill of the Daily Record dismissed it as "a lacklustre affair with the wannabe star ditching her Mariah sound- a-like singing in favour of becoming a Kylie clone". The single debuted at number nineteen on the UK Singles Chart, the week dated January 25, 2003. The position became its peak position. The following week, the song dropped to number thirty-seven and the week after exited the top forty.

=== Promotion ===
A promotional music video for the song was filmed, which showed Ribbons wearing heavy makeup and donning a stylish costume. The first scene of the music video takes place in an elevator-like set. Ribbons is shown singing in the elevator. Then, as the video progresses she is shown dancing with her backup dancers, in a set with the lyrics of the song inscribed on its walls. Then, Ribbons is shown seducing a man in the elevator. In the last scene Ribbons, along with the backup dancers, dance on a parking lot like set. The music video premiered on CD:UK on December 7, 2002. Dean Piper of The Mirror noted the video to be "groovy".

"A Little Bit" was first performed on the Party in the Park event in 2002. Later, she performed it on various televised appearances such as the British chart show Top of the Pops, Smile and CD:UK. She also appeared on Smash Hits' chart countdown and promoted the song. In March 2003, she toured with British pop group Liberty X.

=== Track listings ===
- UK enhanced CD Single
1. "A Little Bit" (Radio edit) – 3:44
2. "A Little Bit" (Rishi 'Smooth' Rich remix) – 4:27
3. "A Little Bit" (M*A*S*H Main Vocal mix) – 6:34
4. "A Little Bit" (Rishi Rich remix) – 3:35
5. "A Little Bit" (Video)
- UK 12-inch vinyl single
1. "A Little Bit" (Bini & Martini High Pressure Mix)
2. "A Little Bit" (Bini & Martini High Pressure Dub)

=== Personnel ===
Personnel are adapted from "A Little Bit" CD single.

- Steve Morales – writing
- Kara DioGuardi – writing
- David Siegal – writing
- ICON – production
- Rishi Rich – remixing
- M*A*S*H – remixing
- Bini & Martini – remixing
- Joanna Barnes – rap
- Tanya Scarborough – rap
