= With You (Jessica Simpson song) =

2003 single by Jessica Simpson

Single by Jessica Simpson

from the album In This Skin
- B-side: "Fly"
- Released: November 3, 2003
- Studio: Big Baby (New York City); Henson (Los Angeles)
- Length: 3:12
- Label: Columbia
- Songwriters: Billy Mann, Andy Marvel, Jessica Simpson
- Producers: Billy Mann, Andy Marvel

Jessica Simpson singles chronology
"Sweetest Sin" (2003)	"With You" (2003)	"Take My Breath Away" (2004)

Audio sample
- file; help

Music video
- "With You" on YouTube

"With You" is a song by American recording artist Jessica Simpson from her third studio album, In This Skin. "With You" was released by Columbia Records as the second single from In This Skin on November 3, 2003. Overall, "With You" was Simpson's seventh single in the United States and her fourth single in the United Kingdom. Billy Mann and Andy Marvel produced the song and co-wrote it with Simpson.

The song peaked within the top 10 in Australia and the United Kingdom, and in the top-twenty in Ireland, Norway, and the United States. The single was certified gold by the Recording Industry Association of America (RIAA) and platinum by the Australian Recording Industry Association (ARIA). The music video for "With You" was directed by Elliott Lester while Simpson was filming the reality show Newlyweds: Nick and Jessica. The video received two nominations at the 2004 MTV Video Music Awards.

== Song information ==
"With You" was written by Jessica Simpson, Billy Mann, and Andy Marvel, and produced by Andy Marvel and Mann. "With You" lasts for three minutes and twelve seconds, and is in the key of D Minor. According to the sheet music published at Musicnotes.com by EMI Music Publishing, the song contains instruments such as piano and guitar. About the idea of the song, Simpson said "it's cool for me just because it's my personality [...] Nick [Lachey] loves me with nothing but a T-shirt on so that's where the song idea came from."

Chuck Taylor of Billboard reviewed "With You" favorably, saying "It´s certainly a hitworthy candidate" and citing "Producers Billy Mann and Andy Marvel add a hint of funk to the mix, giving the track enough hip appeal to make the grade at today's top 40." The song was also a Track Pick from the AllMusic review of In This Skin by Stephen Thomas Erlewine, along with "Be", "I Have Loved You." and "Sweetest Sin".

== Chart performance ==
=== North America ===
In the United States, the song debuted at number 65 on the Billboard Hot 100 on the issue dated December 27, 2003. On March 20, 2004, the single reached its peak position of number 14 and was awarded the honor of that week's Greatest Gainer Sales. The single stayed on the chart for 23 weeks. "With You" became Simpson's fourth top-forty single in the US and her second highest peak on the chart since "I Wanna Love You Forever" (1999). The song also peaked at number one on the Billboard Pop Songs chart and was her first number one on the chart. On the Hot Digital Tracks chart, the single debuted at number 23 on the issue dated January 10, 2004. The song peaked at number seven on the chart with 10,000 digital download sales by February 14, 2004. The single was certified gold by RIAA for selling 500,000 copies. "With You" is her second best selling digital single with 1 million copies sold.

=== Oceania and Europe ===
In Australia, the single debuted at number 25 on the ARIA Charts for the week of April 4, 2004. The next week, it reached at number 17. Seven weeks later, the song peaked at number four and stayed on the chart for 24 weeks. The single became her highest peak at the time and her first top-five in that country. Later was certified Platinum by ARIA, denoting shipments of 70,000 units within the country. In New Zealand, the song only reached at number 39 on the issue of April 19, 2004.

In United Kingdom, the song debuted at number seven on the issue dated June 20, 2004. The single stayed on the chart for eight weeks and became her fourth top 20 there. In Norway, the single debuted at number 11. It descended at number 13 the next week and stayed on the chart for six weeks. It became her third top-20 hit in that country since "Irresistible" (2001). In Ireland, the song debuted at number 11 on the issue dated June 17, 2004. The single became her highest peak at the time there.

== Music video ==
=== Development and release ===
As the single was released while Simpson's reality show, Newlyweds: Nick and Jessica, was still on air and at the peak of its popularity, the video of the song was created to parallel the show. The music video for "With You" was filmed in October 2003, by Elliott Lester. This is the last music video in which Simpson and then-husband Nick Lachey appear together as husband and wife.

=== Synopsis ===
Simpson is featured chowing down on Chicken of the Sea tuna—an allusion to the first episode, where she asks if the famous tuna brand is really chicken—and buffalo wings, a reference to another gaffe of hers, when she asks if buffalo wings come from buffalo. At one point she is sporting a T-shirt reading "plata-ma-pus," the way Jessica thought "platypus" was pronounced. She is shown around the house making haphazard attempts at housekeeping, another reference to the first episode, when Lachey reproves her for not trying to do more around the house herself. In the video, she floods a sink with soapsuds and awkwardly tries to Swiffer the kitchen floor; a later scene shows her trying to sort dirty laundry. She is also seen golfing, another thing she has difficulty with on the show.

=== Reception and impact ===
The video was featured on music programs such as MTV's Total Request Live and MuchMusic. On January 20, 2004, it debuted on Total Request Live; the music video also ranked No. 1 on MuchMusic. It was nominated for two MTV Video Music Awards at the 2004 awards in the categories of Best Female Video and Best Pop Video, but lost both of them. She performed the song at the ceremony along with "Angels". The video was the fourth most played clip on MTV for the week of February 1, 2004. On VH1, the music video was the sixth most played video by February 22, 2004.

== Track listings ==
DVD single

1. "With You"
2. The making of "With You"
3. "Sweetest Sin"
4. The making of "Sweetest Sin"

CD 1

1. "With You" (album version) – 3:12
2. "Fly" (album version) – 3:32

CD 2

1. "With You" (album version)
2. "With You" (acoustic version)
3. "Where You Are" (edit version)
4. "With You" (video)

Australian maxi-CD single

1. "With You"
2. "Irresistible"
3. "I Wanna Love You Forever"

== Credits and personnel ==
- Songwriting: Billy Mann, Andy Marvel, Jessica Simpson
- Production: Billy Mann, Andy Marvel

== Charts ==
=== Weekly charts ===
Weekly chart performance for "With You"
Chart (2003–2004)	Peak position
Australia (ARIA)	4
Canada CHR/Pop (Radio & Records)	29
Hungary (Dance Top 40)	23
Ireland (IRMA)	11
New Zealand (Recorded Music NZ)	39
Norway (VG-lista)	11
Scottish Singles Sales (Official Charts)	6
UK Singles (Official Charts)	7
US Billboard Hot 100	14
US Adult Pop Airplay (Billboard)	23
US Pop Airplay (Billboard)	1
US Top 40 Tracks (Billboard)	4

=== Year-end charts ===
Year-end chart performance for "With You"
Chart (2004)	Position
Australia (ARIA)	14
UK Singles (OCC)	200
US Billboard Hot 100	50
US Mainstream Top 40 (Billboard)	6

== Certifications ==
Certifications for "With You"
Region	Certification	Certified units/sales
Australia (ARIA)	Platinum	70,000^{^}
United Kingdom	—	29,000
United States (RIAA)	Gold	500,000^{*}
^{*} Sales figures based on certification alone.^{^} Shipments figures based on certification alone.

== Release history ==
Release dates and formats for "With You"
Region	Date	Format	Label	Ref.
United States	November 3, 2003	Contemporary hit radio	Columbia	
United States	December 16, 2003	DVD	Columbia	
Australia	March 22, 2004	CD	Columbia	
United Kingdom	June 14, 2004	CD	Columbia	
Denmark	June 21, 2004	CD	Columbia	
