= Irresistible (Jessica Simpson song) =

2001 single by Jessica Simpson

Single by Jessica Simpson

from the album Irresistible
- Released: April 17, 2001 (Note: The release indicates the "earliest known" release date.)
- Recorded: 2000
- Studio: Murlyn (Stockholm); Sony Music (New York City)
- Genre: R&B; teen pop
- Length: 3:13
- Label: Columbia
- Songwriters: Anders Bagge; Arnthor Birgisson; Pamela Sheyne
- Producers: Anders Bagge; Arnthor Birgisson

Jessica Simpson singles chronology
"I Think I'm in Love with You" (2000)	"Irresistible" (2001)	"A Little Bit" (2001)

Music video
- "Irresistible" on Youtube.com

"Irresistible" is a song by American recording artist Jessica Simpson that Columbia Records released in 2001, as the lead single from her second studio album of the same name. Its title and concept were proposed by singer-songwriter Pamela Sheyne, while Arnthor Birgisson, an acquaintance of Sony chief executive officer Tommy Mottola, and his partner Anders Bagge developed the melody and co-wrote the verses with Sheyne. It is more sexually suggestive than Simpson's previous songs.

The song, composed in the key of G sharp minor, is a mid-tempo R&B number with dance-pop, teen pop and funk influences. Instruments featured in the song include strings, synthesizers, percussion, and acoustic piano. The lyrics center on the tension between a young woman's sexual desires and her inhibitions. A So So Def remix of the piece features Lil' Bow Wow and Jermaine Dupri, and incorporates samples of Kool & the Gang's "Jungle Boogie" (1973).

The accompanying music video, directed by Simon Brand, has a James Bond theme and features scenes of Simpson dressed as a spy. A music video for the So So Def remix was also filmed, featuring appearances by Dupri and Lil' Bow Wow inter-cut with scenes of Simpson. She performed the song as part of the set list of her DreamChaser Tour (2001) and Reality Tour (2004). The single was also promoted with live performances on various televised appearances and the MTV Total Request Live Tour (2001). "Irresistible" was featured on the Disney Channel Original Series Lizzie McGuire (2001).

Critics gave "Irresistible" mostly mixed reviews. Although a few praised the song for its theme and production, most criticized Simpson's singing style, the sexual nature of the song's lyrics, and the over-use of digital sound enhancers. The song reached number two on Poland, number eleven on the UK Singles Chart and number fifteen on the United States Billboard Hot 100, while peaking within the top twenty in twelve other countries. Despite not charting within the top twenty in Australia, it was certified gold by the Australian Recording Industry Association (ARIA) for shipments of more than 35,000 copies within the country. The song ranked on the Billboard Hot 100 and Australian year-end charts at numbers sixty-three and fifty, respectively.

== Writing and recording ==
"Irresistible" (also registered as "Irresistable" with the American Society of Composers, Authors and Publishers) was written specifically for Simpson by Swedish composers Anders Bagge and Arnthor Birgisson, in collaboration with English singer-songwriter Pamela Sheyne, who also contributed vocals for the demo. Initial recording of the song was done at the Murlyn Studios, Stockholm, for which Sheyne provided the background vocals with the final recording being done at Sony Music Studios, New York City. In an interview, Birgisson commented on the collaboration with Sheyne saying that:

"Pam came up with the title 'Irresistible', and as she started talking about the whole concept we immediately became inspired and began working on the music. You know, when we hear a concept or a title that we like—no matter if it's ours or somebody else's—both Anders and I get a feel for the song's vibe; a feel for whether a keyboard or guitar should be used to give it a certain character, be it upbeat or melancholic. So, when Pam mentioned the title, we immediately came up with the tempo and the whole feeling of the song, and then she came up with the lyrics. There was a really good flow to that song. We played around with the melody, put down the demo, and it was done."

Vocals were recorded and engineered by Robert Williams using a Sony C-800G Studio Tube condenser microphone while post-recording editing, via the Pro Tools software, was done by Peter Wade Keusch. Mats Berntoft played the guitar on the track, while Bagge mixed the song. Ted Jensen mastered it at Sterling Sound, New York City.

== Composition ==
"Irresistible"
A 19-second sample of "Irresistible"'s chorus, featuring Simpson's use of breathy vocals, and the instrumentation including synths, percussion, and acoustic piano.

"Irresistible" is a moderately paced R&B song composed in the verse–chorus–bridge form with a play time of three minutes and thirteen seconds. The song draws influence mostly from the dance-pop genre while infusing elements of funk music, and Latin rhythms. The song is written in common time, in the key of G sharp minor. The tempo is ninety-four beats per minute, with a chord progression of G#m–C#m_{7}–E–D#_{7}. Simpson's vocals in the song span over two octaves from the low note of E_{3} to the high note of D#_{5}. Cashbox Canada commented that Simpson adopts "breathy vocals" for the song, and it has a "gently danceable backing", while Chuck Taylor of Billboard noted that Simpson's vocals in the song were "funk-fortified". The Dallas Morning News' Teresa Gubbins observed that the track possesses a rat-a-tat-tat beat, similar to "There You Go" (2000) by singer Pink. The song features a string section by Stockholm Session Strings as well as spoken passages by Simpson and a midsection breakdown.

"Irresistible" is a groove-laden song, following a musical setting that is beat-oriented. In an interview with Associated Press, Simpson said that "Irresistible" is "very sexy, more grown-up. I think you're going to see a new side of Jessica Simpson." Lyrically, according to Birgisson, the song carries some feminine viewpoints that Sheyne had managed to incorporate through her contribution. Ben Graham, the author of Maximum Jessica Simpson, noted that the lyrics suggest that Simpson finds it hard to keep her famous virginity image intact. This can be inferred from the lines "I know that I'm supposed to make him wait / Let him think I like the chase / But I can't stop fanning the fire / I know I meant to say no… / But he's irresistible," Bob Waliszewski of Plugged In (publication) pointed out that the verses "I can't stop fanning the fire [...] Now inescapable" refer to an "imminent sexual compromise". "She knows she shouldn't give in, but seems past the point of no return," he explained. However, Taylor stated that lyrically, the song demands for "total fulfillment". The version featured on Lizzie McGuire soundtrack replaces the lyric "When he makes me weak with desire" with "When he makes me want to move closer" and "But I can't stop fanning the fire / I know I meant to say no" with "But it's time to stop this emotion / Right now I'm gonna say no."

== Remixes and release ==
"Irresistible" was commissioned for remixes from So So Def Recordings, Hex Hector, and Dezrok. The So So Def remix of the song, produced by Jermaine Dupri, features American rapper Lil' Bow Wow and Dupri himself. It samples Kool & the Gang's song, "Jungle Boogie" (1973) and Luniz's song, "I Got 5 on It" (1995). Another remix of the song was produced by American producer Hex Hector. According to Slant Magazine, the Hex Hector remix of the song uses full-throated vocals by Simpson, and includes disco-influenced string arrangement, which is comparable to the musical style of Giorgio Moroder, and utilizes beats from a Roland TR-808. Ron Thal, the lead guitarist of the hard rock band Guns N' Roses, plays guitar on the remix tracks. Both of the remixes are included on Simpson's remix extended play (EP) This Is the Remix (2002). Brendan Frederick of Complex wrote that while the remix could not do anything to complement the original track's chart performance, it helped achieve a "gimmicky redemption". He also noted that although the samples were used in the song "Satisfy You" by Puff Daddy about one and a half year ago, the remix of "Irresistible" sounded "kinda [sic] sweet".

Sony Music Entertainment released "Irresistible" in the United Kingdom and Ireland on April 12, 2001. In the United States, "Irresistible" was first commissioned as a radio-only single, on April 17, 2001. Later, a promotional CD single was issued, containing the album version of the song. A vinyl was also released, on June 26, 2001, which includes the remixes of the song. In France, the single was released on April 27, 2001, as a maxi-single and vinyl. The pressing contains the album version as the A-side, and the So So Def remix as the B-side. Sony Music released a CD single of "Irresistible" in Germany, on June 25, 2001. Sony Music Holland released the song as a single in the Netherlands on June 23, 2001. In Australia, "Irresistible" was released on July 2, 2001, as a CD single. The same day, it was released in Sweden through Sony Music. The song is also included on the Italian compilation album Festivalbar (2001).

== Critical reception ==
"Irresistible" was received with mostly mixed reviews by music critics. Although a few critics called the song a "peppy" number, others commented that they did not like the song, and criticized the sexuality of its lyrics and the over-usage of digital sound manipulators. Stephen Thomas Erlewine of Allmusic stated that the song and "A Little Bit", the second single released from the parent album, were a "double-punch" and picked the former song as a standout from the album. Cashbox Canada, ranking the song at number ten on "Top 10 Love Songs: The Crush", praised it as "an ode to love at step one". Similarly, Chuck Taylor of Billboard reviewed "Irresistible" favorably, calling it "a sexy, uptempo romp about new found love that proves Simpson's pop intuition." In another review, Taylor complimented the contemporary appeal of the track and felt that it would be a staple at radios. He also noticed that the breakdown and spoken passages of the song gave it a "street edge", something not previously heard from Simpson. Teresa Gubbins of The Dallas Morning News had mixed feelings towards the song in her review, writing that its sound might help Simpson get attention on urban radios, but did nothing to demonstrate her voice. Larry Printz of The Morning Call also expressed a similar view of the song, stating that the song "is loaded with platitudes, but [it's] easy on the ears."

However, Siobhan Grogan of NME magazine stated "to the delight of lonely men everywhere, she tells us she's 'weak with desire' and knows 'I'm meant to say no'—and the mind boggles at how she'd have turned out if she'd spent her teens glugging cider on a street corner." Chuck Campbell of Daily News viewed the song as "gurgling" and noted that Simpson was singing it breathlessly. An editor of The Advocate remarked that the track sounded more manufactured than composed. Craig Seymour of The Buffalo News wrote that he felt "Irresistible" was a "limp seduction tune". Similarly, David Browne of Entertainment Weekly wrote that the single could have been easily reprocessed for a "new virginity ad campaign." The Northern Echo's Hayley Gyllenspetz dismissed the song, elaborating that it sounded similar to the works of Britney Spears and Christina Aguilera. She added, "If only this 21- year-old songbird had done something original she may indeed have been irresistible." An editor of The Malay Mail echoed Gyllenspetz's comment, writing that the track sounded like a typical Aguilera pop-Latino piece. Simon P. Ward from Dotmusic compared the song to the work of Britney, Christina, and Jennifer Lopez and felt that "Irresistible' will doubtless further Simpson's cause as the next poster girl for all discerning adolescents. The pop conveyor belt rolls on…". In 2003, "Irresistible" won a Broadcast Music Incorporated (BMI) "Pop Music Award". Irresistible ranked at number 87 on Top 100 Pop Songs of 2001 by About.com.

== Chart performance ==
=== North America ===
"Irresistible" experienced moderate commercial success worldwide, reaching the top forty of the charts in eleven countries. In the United States, the song initially debuted at number five on the Billboard Bubbling Under Hot 100 Singles chart, on the issue dated May 5, 2001. Three weeks later, it debuted at number sixty-nine on the Billboard Hot 100. In mid-July the single reached its peak position of number fifteen on the Hot 100 and stayed on the chart for twenty weeks. Its peak position in the chart was thanks to the airplay, largely due to its release as a radio-only single rather than the traditional CD single. "Irresistible" became Simpson's second top-twenty single in the US, following "I Wanna Love You Forever" (1999). The song also reached number three on Billboard Pop Songs chart, her highest peak at the time, and her second single to reach the top five. Although it did not chart on the Hot Dance Club Play chart, "Irresistible" reached number one on the Billboard Hot Dance Music/Maxi-Singles Sales, on the issue dated July 14, 2001. On the 2001 Billboard year-end charts, the song was ranked at number sixty-three on the Hot 100 Singles. In Canada, "Irresistible" debuted at number sixteen on the Canadian Singles Chart, on the issue of August 4, 2001, and stayed on the Top 100 for fifteen weeks . The song also reached number fifteen on the Canadian Nielsen BDS Airplay chart. "Irresistible" has sold 45,000 physical copies and 450,000 paid digital downloads according to Nielsen Soundscan. It is her fifth best-selling digital single in the United States.

=== Europe and Oceania ===
Abroad, in the United Kingdom, "Irresistible" debuted at number eleven on the UK Singles Chart for the week of July 14, 2001, and stayed on the chart for six weeks. It became her third top-twenty single there. In Ireland, the song made its first appearance on the chart at number eighteen during the week of July 5, 2001, a position which became its peak in that country. During the week of July 15, 2001, the single debuted at number twenty-one on the Australian ARIA Singles Chart and stayed on the chart for eleven weeks. It was later certified gold by Australian Recording Industry Association (ARIA), denoting shipments of 35,000 units within the country. It reached number fifty on the ARIA year-end singles chart. In New Zealand, the single debuted at number forty-five, however dropping to number fifty the following week. It eventually peaked at number forty-one.

In Norway, "Irresistible" debuted at number eighteen on the VG-lista charts. It descended to number twenty-one the next week, before reaching its peak position of number sixteen during the fourth week on the chart. The song reached number two on the Ultratip chart of Belgium's Wallonia region, and number forty-six on the Belgium Flanders Ultratop 50 chart. It also reached number fifty in Austria, thirty-three in Germany and seventeen in Sweden. In Switzerland, the single debuted at number twenty-three, on the issue dated July 1, 2001. The next week peaked at number twenty and stayed on the chart for fourteen weeks. In the Netherlands, "Irresistible" reached a peak of number fifty-four on the Mega Single Top 100 chart. In Romania, the song reached number seventeen on the Romanian Singles Chart, and stayed on the chart for twenty-six weeks. It made number fifty-three on the country's year-end charts. Due to its appearance on several European charts, the song peaked at number nineteen on the European Hot 100 Singles chart, as compiled by Billboard.

== Music video ==
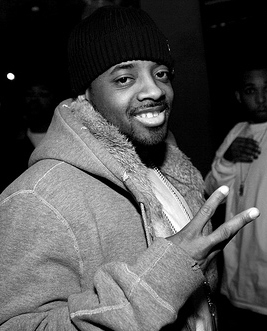
Jermaine Dupri (pictured) appears on the video for the song's So So Def remix.

Fraser Middleton of The Evening Times wrote that Simpson captured a "girl next door" image with her previous album and the music videos for its accompanying singles. Although the album was successful, Columbia Records felt it was far from the successes of her contemporaries, Aguilera and Spears and that Simpson needed to make some changes to her image. As a part of the change, she lost weight, dressed in a more sexy style and learned dance. Simpson said the video is a kind of "comic strip girl come to life" further explaining that the video was something she had never done before.

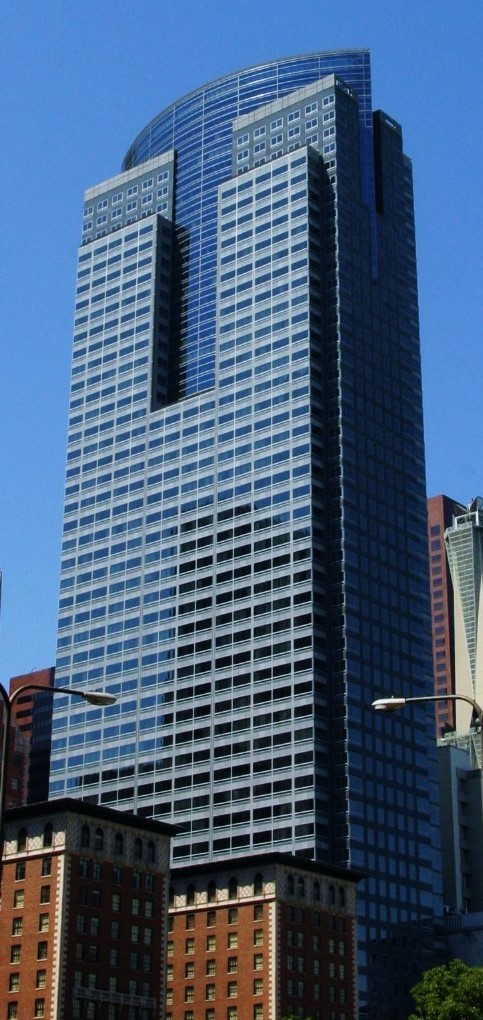
Gas Company Tower (pictured) where part of the video was filmed.

The music video was directed by Colombian film director Simon Brand, in Los Angeles, and was choreographed by Dan Karaty. Shot in a set with futuristic backdrops, Simpson assumes the role of a spy on a mission in the video. It begins with Simpson exiting a helicopter then entering a building to compromise evidence in a laboratory there. Simpson takes the elevator which opens onto a pathway. While she is walking, a gadget appears on the floor followed by a small explosion. In the next scene, Simpson walks through a water tunnel, out of which she is pulled by a robotic hand. As the video progresses, Simpson is shown dancing in a room full of mirrors. Scenes of ninjas climbing up a rope hanging from top of the building are inter-cut with scenes of Simpson dancing until the laboratory explodes. Simpson is next shown dancing on the rooftop alongside the ninjas before a helicopter arrives and Simpson boards it.

The video premiered on MTV's Total Request Live on May 9, 2001. Upon the premiere, critics gave the music video mixed reviews. People magazine called the video "humptastic", referring to Simpson's progressive sexual image from her previous videos, while an editor for The Irish Independent wrote that Simpson looked "incredibly sexy" in the video. Billboard's Chuck Taylor also reviewed the video positively, writing the video will "add to the allure" of Simpson becoming a "sex-symbol". Similarly, Melissa Ruggeri of The Richmond Times-Dispatch also gave a positive review, writing that the term "Irresistible" fitted the video. However, Siobhan Grogan of NME magazine wrote that Simpson has no apprehension "about 'forgetting' most of her clothes for the video". Craig Seymour of The Buffalo News criticized Simpson's ungraceful performance on the video, which was echoed by Jon Bream and Chris Riemenschneider of The Star Tribune who felt Simpson was trying too hard to be a sexpot in the video. The video reached number two on MTV's Total Request Live (TRL) countdown, and number seventeen on MuchMusic Canada's Top 30 Countdown. In the So So Def remix music video, which featured additional direction from Cameron Casey and followed the same plot as the unmixed version, scenes of Lil' Bow Wow and Dupri rapping are intercut with scenes of Simpson performing the song. The So So Def remix version of the video premiered on BET's 106 & Park in July 2001.

== Live performances ==
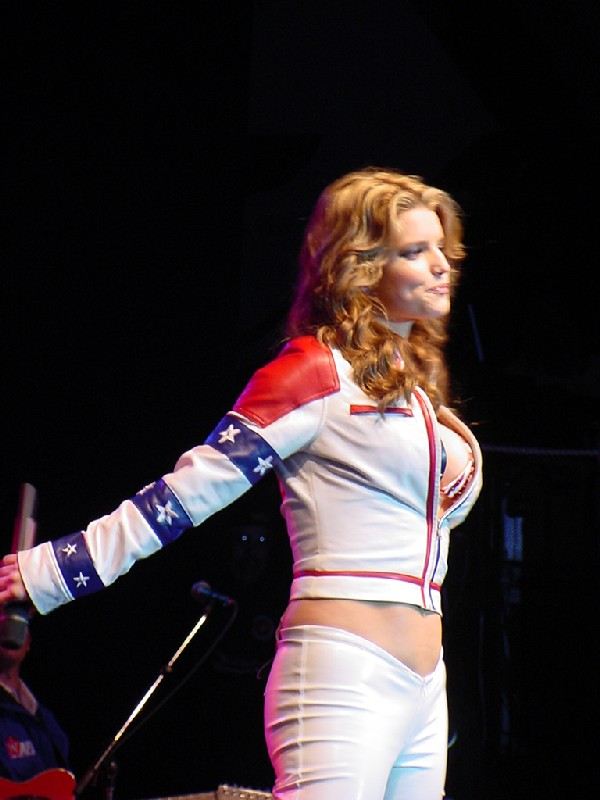
Simpson performing the song on the United Service Organization's Celebrity tour

"Irresistible" was included on the setlist of her DreamChaser Tour (2001) and Reality Tour (2004). In the book People in the News: Jessica Simpson and Nick Lachey, Terri Dougherty wrote that Simpson wanted the DreamChaser Tour to feature her as a singer and dancer, following the model laid down by performers like Britney Spears. Therefore, Simpson made the choreography more risqué by adding backup dancers and performing dance moves in revealing outfits. The song was also performed on MTV's Total Request Live Tour in which she was supported by six backup dancers. Her performance was commended by The Richmond Times-Dispatch, who wrote that her voice "soared," but criticized by The Buffalo News' Andrea Kibler and St. Louis Post-Dispatch's Kevin C. Johnson, both of whom opined that Simpson was lip-syncing the whole song.

Simpson performed the song on The Rosie O'Donnell Show on May 11, 2001. On June 1, she performed at the summer concert Zootopia, organized by Radio Z100. Six days later, she performed on The Tonight Show with Jay Leno. On June 11, she appeared on an episode of MuchMusic in Canada, and sang "Irresistible". On June 16, she performed it at Wango Tango, an annual all-day concert organized by KIIS-FM, in California. On July 4, 2001, it was performed at the Macy's 4th of July Fireworks Spectacular, for the celebration of Independence Day. In December 2001, Simpson joined the cast of KBKS-FM's Jingle Bell Bash in Seattle.

In late 2001, Simpson sang the song as part of MTV's Spring Break program, held in Cancún, Mexico. She later performed the song at The Monkey Club in Paris, France. "Irresistible" was sung during the 2001 Dick Clark's New Year's Rockin' Eve, along with "A Little Bit". In 2002, Simpson sang "Irresistible" at Rockin' for the USA, a music special honoring the United States Armed Forces. In 2004, Simpson went out on her second headlining tour, the Reality Tour, to promote her third studio album In This Skin (2003). The tour, unlike the DreamChaser Tour, had no dance production. On the Houston stop of the North American leg of the tour, Simpson performed "Irresistible" at the end of the show, before singing "With You", a song from In This Skin, as the encore. However, on the Ohio stop, she performed the song after "Underneath", another song from In This Skin. Her performance was approved by Dustin J. Seibert of The Cincinnati Enquirer, who wrote that "Simpson's reliance on her high-octane voice and bubbly personality set her apart from some of her pop counterparts."

== Track listings ==
- Australian maxi-CD
1. "Irresistible" – 3:13
2. "Irresistible" (So So Def Remix) – 3:34
3. "Irresistible" (Riprock 'N' Alex G Remix Deluxe) – 3:05
4. "Irresistible" (Hex Hector Club Mix) – 8:53
- European and Swedish maxi single
1. "Irresistible" – 3:13
2. "Irresistible" (So So Def Remix) – 3:34
3. "Irresistible" (Hex Hector Club Mix) – 3:31
4. "Irresistible" (Music Video) – 3:09
- UK vinyl 12-inch
1. "Irresistible" (So So Def Remix) – 3:34
2. "Irresistible" (Riprock 'N' Alex G Remix Deluxe) – 3:05
3. "Irresistible" (Album Version) – 3:14
- US vinyl 12-inch
1. "Irresistible" (Hex Hector Club Mix) – 8:53
2. "Irresistible" (So So Def Remix) – 3:34
3. "Irresistible" (Riprock 'N' Alex G Remix Deluxe) – 3:05
4. "Irresistible" (Kupper Club Mix) – 7:04
5. "Irresistible" (Kupper Club Mix Instrumental) – 7:04
6. "Irresistible" (So So Def Remix Instrumental) – 3:34

== Credits and personnel ==
Album version

- Anders Bagge – writer, producer, mixer
- Arnthor Birgisson – writer, producer
- Pamela Sheyne – writer, background vocals
- Ted Jensen – mastering
- Peter Wade Keusch – pro tools editing, Engineering
- Jessica Simpson – lead vocals, background vocals
- Jeanette Olsson – background vocals
- Mats Berntoft – guitar
- Stockholm Session Strings – strings

Remixes

- Jermaine Dupri – re-mixer, vocals, mixer
- Lil' Bow Wow – vocals
- Phil Tan – mixer
- Vic Anesini – mastering
- Hex Hector – producer, re-mixer
- Dezrok – producer, re-mixer
- Riprock – re-mixer
- Ron Thal – guitar

== Charts ==
=== Weekly charts ===
Weekly chart performance for "Irresistible"
Chart (2001)	Peak position
Australia (ARIA)	21
Austria (Ö3 Austria Top 40)	50
Belgium (Ultratop 50 Flanders)	46
Belgium (Ultratip Bubbling Under Wallonia)	6
Canada (Nielsen SoundScan)	16
Canada CHR (Nielsen BDS)	6
Europe (European Hot 100 Singles)	19
Europe (European Radio Top 50)	19
Germany (GfK)	33
Hungary Airplay (Music & Media)	20
Ireland (IRMA)	18
Italy (FIMI)	26
Netherlands (Dutch Top 40 Tipparade)	7
Netherlands (Single Top 100)	54
New Zealand (Recorded Music NZ)	41
Norway (VG-lista)	16
Poland (Polish Singles Chart)	2
Romania (Romanian Top 100)	17
Scottish Singles Sales (Official Charts)	11
Sweden (Sverigetopplistan)	17
Switzerland (Schweizer Hitparade)	20
UK Singles (Official Charts)	11
US Billboard Hot 100	15
US Pop Airplay (Billboard)	3
US Rhythmic Airplay (Billboard)	12
US Top 40 Tracks (Billboard)	5

=== Year-end charts ===
Year-end chart performance for "Irresistible"
Chart (2001)	Position
Canada (Nielsen SoundScan)	118
Canada Radio (Nielsen BDS)	97
Romania (Romanian Top 100)	53
US Billboard Hot 100	63
US Mainstream Top 40 (Billboard)	30
US Rhythmic Top 40 (Billboard)	55
US Top 40 Tracks (Billboard)	36

== Certifications ==
Certifications and sales for "Irresistible"
Region	Certification	Certified units/sales
Australia (ARIA)	Gold	35,000^{^}
^{^} Shipments figures based on certification alone.

== Release history ==
Region	Date	Format(s)	Label(s)	Ref(s).
United States	April 17, 2001	Contemporary hit radio	Columbia	
Denmark	June 11, 2001	CD	Sony Music	
France	June 11, 2001	Maxi-CD	Sony Music	
Netherlands	June 23, 2001	CD	Sony Music	
Germany	June 25, 2001	CD	Sony Music	
United States	June 26, 2001	12-inch vinyl	Columbia	
Australia	July 2, 2001	CD	Sony Music	
Sweden	July 2, 2001	CD	Sony Music	
United Kingdom	July 2, 2001	Cassette; CD	Columbia	

== Notes ==
General

Specific
