= I Think I'm in Love with You =

2000 single by Jessica Simpson

Single by Jessica Simpson

from the album Sweet Kisses
- B-side: "You Don't Know What Love Is"
- Released: February 23, 2000
- Studio: Lobo (Long Island, New York); The Hit Factory (New York City)
- Genre: Dance-pop
- Length: 3:18 (album version); 3:40 (radio version)
- Label: Columbia
- Songwriters: Cory Rooney; Dan Shea; John Mellencamp
- Producers: Cory Rooney; Dan Shea

Jessica Simpson singles chronology
"Where You Are" (2000)	"I Think I'm in Love with You" (2000)	"Irresistible" (2001)

Music video
- "I Think I’m in Love with You" on Youtube.com

"I Think I'm in Love with You" is a song written and produced by Cory Rooney and Dan Shea for Jessica Simpson's 1999 debut album, Sweet Kisses. It contains a sample of singer-songwriter John Mellencamp's "Jack & Diane" (1982) and was released as the album's third and final single in mid-2000; in Japan, it was issued as the album's second single in February 2000. The single reached the top 10 in Australia and Canada and the top 20 in Iceland, New Zealand, Scotland and the United Kingdom. In the United States, it peaked at number 21 on the Billboard Hot 100. Simpson also recorded a Spanish version of the song titled "Tal vez es amor".

== Composition ==
Jessica Simpson "I Think I'm in Love with You" (2000)
A sample of "I Think I'm in Love with You"' chorus.

"I Think I'm in Love with You" is a dance-pop song, with a length of three minutes and 35 seconds. The song samples the signature opening guitar-based melody line of John Mellencamp's 1982 song "Jack & Diane". The song is written in the key of A major, with a chord progression of A–E/A–A–E-D, and the song is set in common time with a tempo of 106 beats per minute. The vocal range spans from D4 to F♯5.

== Chart performance ==
"I Think I'm in Love with You" was more up-tempo than Jessica Simpson's previous singles and became a hit. In the United States, the single debuted at number 63 on the Billboard Hot 100, on the issue dated July 1, 2000. Due largely on the strength of its radio airplay, the song peaked at number 21 in its seventh week and stayed on the chart for 16 weeks. The single reached number five on the Billboard Pop Songs chart and stayed on that chart for 22 weeks. "I Think I'm in Love with You" was her first top five on the chart. Also achieved success on the Adult Contemporary and Rhythmic Top 40 charts. "I Think I'm in Love with You" sold 20,000 physical copies and has sold over 316,000 paid digital downloads, according to Nielsen SoundScan.

In Canada, "I Think I'm in Love with You" reached the top 20, peaking at number 14. It became her second top 20 hit in that country. The song also reached number two on the Canada RPM singles chart and was her highest peak at the time. The song stayed on the chart for 20 weeks. In Australia, the single debuted at number 30 on the ARIA Charts during the week of June 25, 2000. Five weeks later, it reached number 10 and was her second top 10 there. The single stayed on the chart for 15 weeks. It was later certified gold by the Australian Recording Industry Association (ARIA), denoting shipments of 35,000 units within the country. In New Zealand, the song debuted at number 33 on the issue of August 6, 2000. In its third week on the chart, the single peaked at number 20.

In United Kingdom, "I Think I'm in Love with You" debuted at number 15 on the UK Singles Chart in the week of July 15, 2000, and stayed on the chart for seven weeks. It became her second top 20 single there. In Switzerland, the single debuted at number 61 on the issue dated June 25, 2000. In the next week, it peaked at number 41 and stayed on the chart for 12 weeks. The single peaked at number three on the Ultratip chart of Belgium's Wallonia region, and number 36 on the Belgium Flanders Ultratop 50 chart. It also reached number 30 in Italy. "I Think I'm in Love with You" peaked at number 31 on the Eurochart Hot 100 Singles chart, as compiled by Billboard.

== Music video ==
"I Think I'm in Love with You" was the first of Simpson's videos to be set to an up-tempo beat. The video was directed by Nigel Dick. The video starts out with Jessica and her girlfriends, including her sister, Ashlee, running into a group of factory workers unloading furniture from a truck. The workers join Simpson and her girlfriends in an impromptu dance on the streets. The video is also intercut with scenes of Simpson in front of a giant heart.

The video's TRL world premiere debut was on June 1, 2000, at number 10. The video peaked at number five and stayed on the countdown for 25 days, making it her first successful video on MTV's TRL.

== Live performances ==
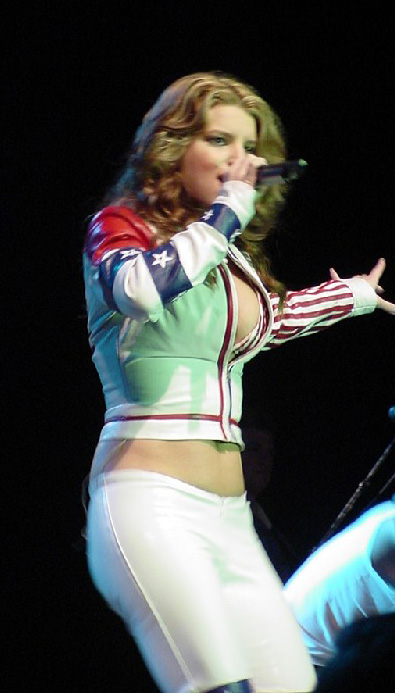
Jessica Simpson performing "I Think I'm in Love with You" on the USO Tour in 2001

"I Think I'm in Love with You" was included on the set list of 98 Degrees' 1999 Heat It Up Tour, where she was the opening act as well as her headlining DreamChaser Tour (2001) and Reality Tour (2004). Simpson performed the song at the Wango Tango concert organized by KISS-FM on May 13, 2000. Five days later, she performed the song on The Rosie O'Donnell Show on May 18, 2000. On June 2, 2000, Simpson performed it at the Zootopia concert, organized by the radio station Z-100. Later, she performed at Summer Music Mania on August 13, 2000. She also performed at Arthur Ashe Kids' Day festivities in New York, on August 26, 2000. On November 21, 2000, she performed the song at the World AIDS Day Concert. On November 23, 2000, Simpson performed the song on The Salvation Army's National Kettle Kick-off half-time show.

== Track listing ==
US maxi-CD

1. "I Think I'm in Love with You" (radio version) – 3:40
2. "I Think I'm in Love with You" (Peter Rauhofer Club Mix) – 9:22
3. "I Think I'm in Love with You" (Peter Rauhofer Dub Mix) – 5:56
4. "I Think I'm in Love with You" (Lenny B's Club Mix) – 9:41
5. "I Think I'm in Love with You" (Soda Club Funk Mix) – 7:29

US 12-inch single

1. "I Think I'm in Love with You" (Peter Rauhofer Club Mix) – 9:19
2. "I Think I'm in Love with You" (Peter Rauhofer Dub Mix) – 6:00
3. "I Think I'm in Love with You" (Lenny B's Club Mix) – 9:39
4. "I Think I'm in Love with You" (Soda Club Funk Mix) – 7:30

Europe CD single

1. "I Think I'm in Love with You" (album version)
2. "I Wanna Love You Forever" (Soda Club Radio Mix)
3. "Where You Are" featuring Nick Lachey (Lenny B's Radio Mix)

UK CD single 1

1. "I Think I'm in Love with You"
2. "I Think I'm in Love with You" (Soda Club Funk Mix)
3. "I Wanna Love You Forever" (music video)

UK CD single 2

1. "I Think I'm in Love with You"
2. "I Think I'm in Love with You" (Lenny B's Radio Mix)
3. "Where You Are" featuring Nick Lachey (music video)

UK cassette single

1. "I Think I'm in Love with You" (radio version)
2. "I Think I'm in Love with You" (Soda Club Mix)

Australian CD single

1. "I Think I'm in Love with You" (radio version)
2. "I Think I'm in Love with You" (album version)
3. "You Don't Know What Love Is"
4. "I Wanna Love You Forever" (Soul Solution Remix Radio Edit)

Japanese CD single

1. "I Think I'm in Love with You" (radio version)
2. "I Wanna Love You Forever" (Soul Solution Remix Radio Edit)

== Charts ==
=== Weekly charts ===
Chart (2000)	Peak position
Australia (ARIA)	10
Belgium (Ultratop 50 Flanders)	36
Belgium (Ultratip Bubbling Under Wallonia)	3
Canada Top Singles (RPM)	2
Canada Adult Contemporary (RPM)	22
Canada (Nielsen SoundScan)	14
Europe (Eurochart Hot 100 Singles)	37
Europe (European Radio Top 50)	9
Germany (GfK)	63
Iceland (Íslenski Listinn Topp 40)	17
Ireland (IRMA)	24
Italy Airplay (Music & Media)	10
Netherlands (Dutch Top 40)	24
Netherlands (Single Top 100)	31
New Zealand (Recorded Music NZ)	20
Scottish Singles Sales (Official Charts)	18
Sweden (Sverigetopplistan)	47
Switzerland (Schweizer Hitparade)	41
UK Singles (Official Charts)	15
US Billboard Hot 100	21
US Adult Contemporary (Billboard)	26
US Dance Club Songs (Billboard)	31
US Dance Singles Sales (Billboard)	44
US Pop Airplay (Billboard)	5
US Rhythmic Airplay (Billboard)	21

=== Year-end charts ===
Chart (2000)	Position
Australia (ARIA)	64
Europe (European Radio Top 50)	65
Netherlands (Dutch Top 40)	182
US Mainstream Top 40 (Billboard)	39
US Rhythmic Top 40 (Billboard)	87

== Certifications ==
Region	Certification	Certified units/sales
Australia (ARIA)	Gold	35,000^{^}
New Zealand (RMNZ)	Gold	5,000^{*}
^{*} Sales figures based on certification alone.^{^} Shipments figures based on certification alone.

== Release history ==
Region	Date	Format(s)	Label(s)	Ref(s).
Japan	February 23, 2000	CD	Sony Music	
United States	May 22, 2000	Contemporary hit; adult contemporary; hot adult contemporary radio	Columbia	
United Kingdom	July 3, 2000	Cassette; two maxi CDs	Columbia	
United States	July 18, 2000	12-inch vinyl; maxi CD	Columbia	

== Other versions ==
=== "Tal vez es amor" ===
"Tal vez es amor"

Promotional single by Jessica Simpson

from the album Divas En Español
- Language: Spanish
- Released: 2001
- Length: 3:34
- Label: Sony Music Group
- Songwriters: Manuel Benito; Cory Rooney; Dan Shea; John Mellencamp
- Producers: Benito; Cory Rooney (executive); Dan Shea (executive)

==== Background and release ====
In 2000, Simpson recorded her first song in Spanish with producer Manuel Benito. The song was recorded for the album Divas en Español. "Tal vez es amor" was written and produced by Manuel Benito among the former producers of the song, Cory Rooney, Dan Shea and John Mellencamp.
