= Totally Dance =

Compilation album by Various artists
- Released: June 26, 2001
- Recorded: Various times
- Genre: Pop
- Label: Arista

Totally Hits chronology
Totally Hits, Vol. 3 (2000)	Totally Dance (2001)	Totally Hits 2001 (2001)

Professional ratings
Review scores
Source	Rating
AllMusic	4/5 stars

Totally Dance is an album in the Totally Hits series. This compilation is a departure from its Totally Hits parents as its main focus is on electronic dance music popular at the time instead of primarily pop hits. It is also the first compilation in the series to focus on a certain genre, before Totally R&B, Totally Hip Hop and the Totally Country series.

== Track listing ==
1. Faithless – "We Come 1" (3:39)
2. Dido – "Thank You" (Deep Dish Vocal Mix) (3:56)
3. Moby – "South Side" (3:28)
4. Sarina Paris – "Look at Us" (Beam & Yanou Mix) (3:21)
5. Dream – "He Loves U Not" (HQ² Mix) (3:39)
6. Pink – "You Make Me Sick" (HQ² Smooth Vibe Vocal Mix) (3:29)
7. Eden's Crush – "Get Over Yourself" (Al B. Rich X-Tended Mix) (3:44)
8. Gigi D'Agostino – "I'll Fly with You (L'amour Toujours)" (4:15)
9. Delerium featuring Sarah McLachlan – "Silence" (Airscape Mix) (3:45)
10. Rui da Silva – "Touch Me" (3:16)
11. Darude – "Sandstorm" (Original Mix) (3:38)
12. Tamia – "Stranger in My House" (HQ² Mix) (4:14)
13. Eddy Grant – "Electric Avenue" (Ringbang Mix by Peter Black) (2:53)
14. Trick Daddy featuring the Slip-n-Slide Express – "Take It to da House" (3:32)
15. Cleptomaniacs featuring Bryan Chambers – "All I Do (Is Think About You)" (2:34)
16. Spiller – "Groovejet (If This Ain't Love)" (3:58)
17. Toni Braxton – "Maybe" (Dynamix NYC Mix) (3:14)
18. Joy Enriquez – "Shake Up the Party" (Pound Boys Fiesta Mix) (3:16)
19. French Affair – "My Heart Goes Boom (La Di Da Da)" (3:40)
