= Totally Hits 2002: More Platinum Hits =

Compilation album by Various artists
- Released: October 29, 2002
- Label: Warner Strategic

Various artists chronology
Totally Hits 2002 (2002)	Totally Hits 2002: More Platinum Hits (2002)	Totally R&B (2003)

Professional ratings
Review scores
Source	Rating
Allmusic	link

Totally Hits 2002: More Platinum Hits is an album in the Totally Hits series, reaching #21 on the US Billboard 200 albums chart. The album is RIAA Certified Platinum selling over 1,000,000 copies

== Track listing ==
1. Pink – "Don't Let Me Get Me" 3:31
2. Michelle Branch – "All You Wanted" 3:38
3. P. Diddy featuring Usher and Loon – "I Need a Girl (Part One)" 4:12
4. Mario – "Just a Friend 2002" 3:36
5. Usher – "U Don't Have to Call" 3:51
6. DJ Sammy featuring Yanou – "Heaven (Candlelight Mix)" 4:04
7. Brandy – "Full Moon" 4:00
8. Nappy Roots featuring Jazze Pha – "Awnaw" 4:02
9. Angie Martinez featuring Lil' Mo and Sacario – "If I Could Go!" 4:09
10. P.O.D. – "Satellite" 3:32
11. Goo Goo Dolls – "Here Is Gone" 3:58
12. Justin Guarini – "Get Here" 4:30
13. BBMak – "Out of My Heart (Into Your Head)" 4:05
14. Monica – "All Eyez on Me" 3:59
15. Clipse – "Grindin'" 4:28
16. The Hives – "Hate to Say I Told You So" 3:22
17. The Calling – "Adrienne" 4:00
18. Donell Jones – "You Know That I Love You" 4:19
19. Boyz II Men – "The Color of Love" 4:35
20. Ian Van Dahl featuring Marsha – "Castles in the Sky" 3:45
