= Totally Hip Hop =

Compilation album by Various artists
- Released: July 1, 2003
- Label: BMG/Warner Music Group

Various artists chronology
Totally R&B (2003)	Totally Hip Hop (2003)	Totally Hits 2003 (2003)

Totally Hip Hop is an album in the Totally Hits series. Released in 2003, the compilation focuses on mostly hip hop singles that were released in the early 2000s. Unlike its Totally Hits counterparts, which mainly focus on Top 40/pop hits, Totally Hip Hop and Totally R&B are the only two compilations focused on urban music acts. It was rated four stars by AllMusic.

== Track listing ==
1. Missy Elliott featuring Ludacris - "Gossip Folks" (3:48)
2. Lil' Kim featuring Mr. Cheeks - "The Jump Off" (3:39)
3. Busta Rhymes featuring Spliff Star - "Make It Clap" (3:35)
4. Wayne Wonder - "No Letting Go" (3:19)
5. Sean Paul - "Gimme the Light" (3:40)
6. Justin Timberlake - "(Oh No) What You Got" (3:52)
7. Benzino featuring Mario Winans - "Rock the Party" (3:47)
8. Lil' Mo featuring Fabolous - "4 Ever" (3:47)
9. Smilez and Southstar - "Tell Me" (4:26)
10. Fabolous - "This Is My Party" (4:26)
11. Christina Aguilera featuring Redman - "Dirrty" (4:39)
12. Brandy - "What About Us?" (3:55)
13. Mystikal - "Bouncin' Back (Bumpin' Me Against the Wall)" (3:57)
14. Clipse - "Young Boy" (3:58)
15. Outkast - "So Fresh, So Clean" (3:51)
16. Petey Pablo - "Raise Up (All Cities Remix)" (3:59)
17. Trick Daddy featuring Cee-Lo and Big Boi - "In da Wind" (4:19)
18. Angie Martinez featuring Sacario & Lil' Mo - "If I Could Go!" (4:06)
19. Tweet - "Oops (Oh My)" (3:57)
20. Nappy Roots featuring Anthony Hamilton - "Po' Folks" (4:07)
