= It Was All a Dream (Dream album) =

Studio album by Dream
- Released: January 23, 2001
- Recorded: 1999–2000
- Genres: Pop; teen pop; dance-pop; R&B
- Length: 55:01
- Labels: Bad Boy; Arista
- Producers: Sean Combs; Steve Kipner; Ken Burns; David Frank; Vincent Herbert; Todd Chapman

Dream chronology
It Was All a Dream (2001)	Reality (2003)

Singles from Dream
- 1. "He Loves U Not" Released: August 22, 2000; 2. "This Is Me" Released: February 27, 2001; 3. "In My Dreams" Released: October 2, 2001

It Was All a Dream is the debut album released by American girl group Dream. It was released on January 23, 2001, by Bad Boy Records. The album garnered a mixed reception from critics. It Was All a Dream debuted at number 6 on the Billboard 200 and spawned two singles: "He Loves U Not" and "This Is Me". The album sold over 1.5 million copies in the United States and was certified Platinum by the Recording Industry Association of America (RIAA). It is the group's only wide album release on Bad Boy Records before being dropped by the label.

== Production ==
Shortly after being formed, Dream's former manager, Judith Fontaine, signed them to Clockwork Entertainment so they could begin working on their debut album. There, they recorded several tracks for the album. Subsequently, Dream parted ways with Fontaine and Clockwork Entertainment. Shortly thereafter, the group signed a record deal with Bad Boy Records. This meant that much of what was recorded at Clockwork Entertainment would be excluded from the album. Original member Alex Chester left the group and was replaced by Diana Ortiz.

== Cover ==
Initial pressings of the CD feature a darkened cover, making the background look brown as well as the picture and text being harder to see, and a misprint on the track listing. The song "Mr. Telephone Man" is listed as simply "Mr. Telephone." Both of these were fixed on subsequent pressings, with the new color being the same image and text, but brightened. Here, the cover's background looks red.

== Critical reception ==
Professional ratings
Review scores
Source	Rating
AllMusic	3/5 stars
Entertainment Weekly	B−
People	Unfavorable
Rolling Stone	3/5 stars

It Was All a Dream received mixed reviews from music critics. Arion Berger of Rolling Stone commended the girl group for delivering an album that contains a charm that's both fierce and adorable, concluding that it "sounds good, and, if you're under eighteen, very good for you, too." David Browne, writing for Entertainment Weekly, was lukewarm on the album, praising the first couple of tracks and the girls' competent vocal delivery but criticized the rest of the album's overlong, generic teen pop content and sounding similar to other girl groups. AllMusic's Stephen Thomas Erlewine gave a mixed review of the record, praising the good-sounding production and decent vocal performances but felt that it overstayed its running time and made the girls feel like non-entities on their own record, concluding that "what separates the good from the great is personality, which is lacking on the otherwise adequate It Was All a Dream." A writer for People found the album's adult content off-putting due to the band members' ages and preferred the tracks "Mr. Telephone Man" and "How Long" for being more age-appropriate for the girl group.

In their look at the Least Essential Albums of 2001, The A.V. Club awarded the record with the title of Least Essential Album By A Protégé Of An Inessential Artist, with Stephen Thompson saying "[I]f taken objectively, It Was All A Dream sounds no less essential than any of the countless teen-courting albums released in recent years. But two qualities set Dream's debut apart from the crowd: a lack of timeliness and the involvement of Sean "P. Diddy" Combs."

== Release and promotion ==
It Was All a Dream was released on January 23, 2001. It debuted at number six on the Billboard 200 with first week sales of 105,000, and spent a total of 20 weeks on the chart. The album went on to sell 1.5 million copies in the U.S. and was certified gold by the RIAA on February 21, 2001, then platinum on March 5, 2001.

Two singles were released from the album: "He Loves U Not" and "This is Me". "He Loves U Not" was released on September 12, 2000 and was a transatlantic hit, peaking at number two on the Billboard Hot 100, number 15 on the Hot R&B/Hip-Hop Singles & Tracks, number 17 on the UK Singles Chart and number 35 on the ARIA Singles Chart. "This is Me" was released on May 1, 2001 and peaked at number 39 on the Billboard Hot 100. The song also reached number 5 on Billboard's Hot Dance Music/Maxi-Singles Sales and number 80 on the Hot R&B/Hip-Hop Singles & Tracks. A separate song written by a different group of writers titled "This Is Me (Remix)" was released to radio and as a commercial CD single on July 10, 2001, however, this song was not included on the album. "In My Dreams" was originally scheduled to be the album's third official single. The song was sent to radio stations in 2001, but never received a full single release.

To further promote the album, Dream opened for Britney Spears on her Oops!... I Did It Again Tour. They also toured with 'N Sync on their No Strings Attached Tour in November 2000, toured with 98 Degrees on their Revelation Tour (2001), and toured with Destiny's Child, Eve, Jessica Simpson, 3LW and Nelly on the MTV TRL Tour (2001). Dream also made several guest appearances on television shows including TRL, The Rosie O'Donnell Show, The Early Show, Live With Regis and Kelly and Good Morning America.

== Track listing ==
No.	Title	Writer(s)	Producer(s)	Length
1.	"It Was All a Dream" (Intro)	Vincent Herbert; Curtis Williams; Kenny Burns; Todd Chapman	Herbert; Williams; Burns; Chapman	1:16
2.	"He Loves U Not"	David Frank; Steve Kipner; Pamela Sheyne	Frank; Kipner	3:46
3.	"In My Dreams"	Sean Combs; Mario Winans; Dez Dottin; Karen Johnson; Gordon Dukes; Jack Knight	Combs; Winans; Dottin; Dukes	4:55
4.	"This Is Me"	Frank; Kipner; Sheyne	Frank	3:12
5.	"I Don't Like Anyone"	Martin Briley; Andy Marvel; Dana Calitri	Ric Wake	3:27
6.	"Reality" (Interlude)	Burns; Chapman	Burns; Chapman	0:42
7.	"Pain"	Holly Arnstein; Melissa Schuman; Ashley Poole; Diana Ortiz; Tom McLaughlin; Burns	Burns; McLaughlin; Winans; Combs	3:35
8.	"When I Get There"	Shelly Peiken; Guy Roche	Roche; Burns	3:55
9.	"What We Gonna Do About Us"	Combs; Knight; Winans	Combs; Winans	4:28
10.	"Jordan" (Interlude)	Burns; Chapman	Burns; Chapman	1:54
11.	"Mr. Telephone Man"	Ray Parker Jr.	Combs	5:02
12.	"Angel Inside"	Knight; Winans; Combs	Winans; Combs	3:10
13.	"Do You Wanna Dance"	Herbert; Williams	Herbert; Williams	3:06
14.	"Miss You"	Herbert; Williams	Herbert; Williams	4:14
15.	"Our Prayer" (Interlude)	Burns; Chapman	Burns; Chapman	1:04
16.	"How Long"	Chapman; Franne Golde; Kasia Livingston	Chapman	4:05
17.	"He Loves U Not" (Remix)	Frank; Sheyne; Harold Ousley	Winans; Combs	3:10
Total length:				55:01

Limited edition Wal-Mart bonus tracks
No.	Title	Length
18.	"Back 2 U"	3:57
19.	"Baby"	3:41
Total length:		62:39

Notes

- "Do You Wanna Dance" and "Miss You" do not feature vocals from Diana Ortiz, but instead feature vocals from former member Alex Chester, as they were recorded before Diana joined. In the fade out of "Do You Wanna Dance", Ashley gives a shout out to Holly, Melissa, and Alex.
- "He Loves U Not" (Remix) contains a sample of "Pretty Please", performed by Houston Person and composed by Harold Ousley.

== Personnel ==
Credits adapted from the liner notes of It Was All a Dream.

- Sean "Puffy" Combs – executive producer
- Andre Harrell – executive producer
- Debbie Hammond – executive producer
- Vincent Herbert – associate executive producer
- Esaie Witherspoon – product manager, project manager, production manager
- Leo Williams – product manager, project manager
- Kim Lumpkin – project manager
- Eddy Schreyer – mastering
- Tonya Salvant – product manager
- Alison Stanley – product manager
- Bento – creative direction and design
- Troy Ward – photography
- Rodney O'Neal McKnight – stylist
- Charlene Roxborough – stylist
- David Cox – hair
- Hikari & Jose – hair
- Erin Ayanian – makeup

== Charts ==
=== Weekly charts ===
Chart (2001)	Peak position
US Billboard 200	6
US Top Internet Albums (Billboard)	15
US Top R&B/Hip-Hop Albums (Billboard)	11

=== Year-end charts ===
Year-end chart performance for It Was All a Dream
Chart (2001)	Position
Canadian Albums (Nielsen SoundScan)	190
US Billboard 200	57
US Top R&B/Hip-Hop Albums	96

== Certifications ==
Region	Certification	Certified units/sales
United States (RIAA)	Platinum	1,000,000^{^}
^{^} Shipments figures based on certification alone.
