= The Princess Diaries soundtracks =

Soundtrack album by various artists

The Princess Diaries soundtracks are soundtracks of the films The Princess Diaries (2001) and The Princess Diaries 2: Royal Engagement (2004) starring Julie Andrews and Anne Hathaway. The albums contain songs sung by well-known charting artists as well as performers signed to Disney that the company wanted to promote. They were released by Walt Disney Records.

== The Princess Diaries soundtrack ==
The Princess Diaries: Original Soundtrack

Soundtrack album by Various artists
- Released: July 24, 2001
- Recorded: 2000–2001
- Genre: Pop
- Length: 54:28
- Label: Walt Disney
- Producers: Timmy Allen; BabyBoy; Andy Goldmark; Jimmy Harry; Sidney James; Tim James; Mark Jolley; Patrick Leonard; Bob Marlette; Milton McDonald; Paul Poli; Veit Renn

Singles from The Princess Diaries: Original Soundtrack
- 1. "Miracles Happen (When You Believe)" Released: July 24, 2001; 2. "Supergirl!" Released: July 24, 2001

Professional ratings
Review scores
| Source | Rating |
|---|---|
| Allmusic | 2.5/5 stars |

=== Track listing ===
| No. | Title | Writer(s) | Performer(s) | Length |
|---|---|---|---|---|
| 1. | "Supergirl" | Jay Moran; Krystal Harris; James Harry | Krystal Harris |
| 2. | "Little Bitty Pretty One" | Bobby Day | Aaron Carter |
| 3. | "Miss You More" | Mark Berry; Christian Burns; Stephen McNally | BBMak |
| 4. | "Crush" | Antonina Armato; Tim James | 3Gs |
| 5. | "What Makes You Different (Makes You Beautiful)" | Howard Dorough; Andreas Carlsson; Steve Diamond | Backstreet Boys |
| 6. | "Miracles Happen (When You Believe)" | Eliot Kennedy; Pam Sheyne | Myra |
| 7. | "Always Tomorrow" | Shelly Peiken; Guy Roche | Nobody's Angel |
| 8. | "Away with the Summer Days" | Shaffer Smith; Mac Robinson; Paul Poli | Youngstown |
| 9. | "Stupid Cupid" | Neil Sedaka; Howard Greenfield | Mandy Moore |
| 10. | "Wake Up" | Isaac Hanson; Taylor Hanson; Zac Hanson | Hanson |
| 11. | "Happy Go Lucky" | Alex Greggs; Andy Goldmark; Brad Daymond | Steps |
| 12. | "I Love Life" | Goldmark; Lefton | Melissa Lefton |
| 13. | "Ain't Nuthin' But a She Thing" | Cheryl James | Lil' J featuring Nobody's Angel and Tammy Phoenix |
| 14. | "Hold On" | Matthew Gerard; Bridget Benenate | B*Witched |
| 15. | "The Journey" | Tami Sogi | Mpulz |

Polish bonus track
| No. | Title | Writer(s) | Performer(s) | Length |
|---|---|---|---|---|
| 16. | "Heartbreak Lullaby" (Ray Hedges 7" mix) | Cathy Dennis; Jan Kask; Peter Mansson | A*Teens |

=== Charts ===
| Chart (2001) | Peak position | Certification |
|---|---|---|
| US Billboard 200 | 41 | Gold |
| US Soundtrack Albums (Billboard) | 5 | Gold |

== The Princess Diaries score ==
The movie's score, composed and conducted by John Debney and performed by the Hollywood Studio Symphony, was also released by Walt Disney Records. This was the first film he scored for director Garry Marshall; Debney wrote the scores for all of Marshall's subsequent films.

=== Track listing ===
| No. | Title | Length |
|---|---|---|
| 1. | "Main Titles" | 0:56 |
| 2. | "Queen Clarisse" | 0:53 |
| 3. | "Mia Invites Lilly to the Ball" | 1:08 |
| 4. | "The Princess Diaries Waltz" | 2:09 |
| 5. | "Mia's Makeover" | 1:08 |
| 6. | "Princess Lessons" | 0:55 |
| 7. | "A New Mia" | 1:05 |
| 8. | "Mia Flees" | 0:53 |
| 9. | "Sorry, Dad" | 0:32 |
| 10. | "Lana, the Traitor" | 1:01 |
| 11. | "Mia Visits the Consulate" | 1:18 |
| 12. | "Scooter Talk" | 0:58 |
| 13. | "I Don't Want to Be a Princess" | 0:37 |
| 14. | "Father Talk" | 1:00 |
| 15. | "The Ball" | 0:37 |
| 16. | "Meeting the Prime Minister" | 1:03 |
| 17. | "A Letter from the King" | 1:16 |
| 18. | "It's a Real Job" | 1:02 |
| 19. | "Mia's Decision" | 2:18 |
| 20. | "Learning to Walk" | 1:42 |
| 21. | "Mia Apologizes" | 0:44 |
| 22. | "Can I Call You Joe?" | 0:58 |
| 23. | "The Kiss" | 1:18 |
| 24. | "Harp Interlude" | 1:24 |
| 25. | "Princess Diaries Medley" | 3:25 |

== The Princess Diaries 2: Royal Engagement soundtrack ==
The Princess Diaries 2: Royal Engagement: Original Soundtrack

Soundtrack album by Various artists
- Released: August 3, 2004
- Recorded: 2003–2004
- Genre: Pop
- Length: 46:12
- Label: Walt Disney
- Producers: Marty Blasick; Andreas Carlsson; Desmond Child; Matthew Gerrard; John Shanks; Peter Stengaard

Julie Andrews chronology
| Classic Julie, Classic Broadway (2001) | The Princess Diaries 2: Royal Engagement (2004) | Julie Andrews Selects Her Favourite Disney Songs (2005) |

Singles from The Princess Diaries 2: Royal Engagement: Original Soundtrack
- 1. "Breakaway" Released: July 19, 2004

Professional ratings
Review scores
| Source | Rating |
|---|---|
| Allmusic | 3/5 stars |

=== Track listing ===
| No. | Title | Writer(s) | Performer(s) | Length |
|---|---|---|---|---|
| 1. | "Breakaway" | Avril Lavigne; Bridget Benenate; Matthew Gerrard | Kelly Clarkson | 3:39 |
| 2. | "I Decide" | Diane Warren | Lindsay Lohan | 3:17 |
| 3. | "This Is My Time" | Raven-Symoné; Gerrard; Robbie Nevil | Raven-Symoné | 4:24 |
| 4. | "I Always Get What I Want" | Lavigne; Clif Magness | Avril Lavigne | 2:31 |
| 5. | "Trouble" | P!nk; Tim Armstrong | P!nk | 3:12 |
| 6. | "Because You Live" | Chris Braide; Andreas Carlsson; Desmond Child | Jesse McCartney | 3:18 |
| 7. | "Love Me Tender" | George R. Poulton; Ken Darby | Norah Jones and Adam Levy | 2:41 |
| 8. | "Fun in the Sun" | Steve Harwell | Steve Harwell | 3:27 |
| 9. | "Let's Bounce" | Gerrard; Nevil | Christy Carlson Romano | 3:18 |
| 10. | "Dance, Dance, Dance" | Brian Wilson; Carl Wilson; Mike Love | Wilson Phillips | 2:00 |
| 11. | "Fools" | Anders Bagge; Arnthor Birgisson; Henrik Janson; Karen Poole | Rachel Stevens | 3:13 |
| 12. | "A Love That Will Last" | David Foster; Linda Thompson | Renee Olstead | 3:32 |
| 13. | "Your Crowning Glory" | Lorraine Feather; Larry Grossman | Julie Andrews and Raven-Symoné | 2:35 |
| 14. | "Miracles Happen" | Pam Sheyne; Eliot Kennedy | Jonny Blu | 4:18 |

=== Charts ===
| Chart (2004) | Peak position | Certification |
|---|---|---|
| US Billboard 200 | 15 | Gold |
| US Soundtrack Albums (Billboard) | 1 | Gold |
