= Myra (album) =

Studio album by Myra
- Released: June 26, 2001 (US)
- Recorded: 2000–2001
- Genre: Teen pop
- Label: Buena Vista
- Producers: Bill Meyers; Jay Landers

Myra chronology
Mensajera del Amór (1997)	Myra (2001)	Milagros (2001)

Singles from Myra
- 1. "Miracles Happen (When You Believe)" Released: June 8, 2001; 2. "Lie, Lie, Lie" Released: 2002; 3. "Step into the Light" Released: 2002

Myra is the second and major-label debut album by American pop singer Myra, released by Buena Vista Records on June 26, 2001. Myra was preceded by the lead single "Miracles Happen (When You Believe)", which was also included on the soundtrack of the Disney film The Princess Diaries. The album also includes Myra's cover of "Dancing in the Street", which had been issued as a single to promote the Disney film Recess: School's Out.

== Release ==
Myra was first released in North America on June 26, 2001. The album was heavily promoted in Limited Too stores, where it was the first CD to be sold.

On April 24, 2002, the album was released in Japan by Walt Disney Records and Avex Trax. It included three additional remixes of "Lie, Lie, Lie", which was released as a single exclusively in Japan. On August 22, 2002, an expanded version of the album, titled Myra+More, was released in Japan. This edition added two further tracks, "Step Into the Light" and "You're the Dream", while removing "Wishing on the Same Star" (which was about to be released as a single by another Avex artist, Namie Amuro).

=== Singles ===
"Miracles Happen (When You Believe)" was the first single from the record and from The Princess Diaries film soundtrack. The music video was filmed at The Shoppes at Buckland Hills mall in Connecticut. It was directed by Scott Marshall and choreographed by Darrin Henson.

"Dancing in the Street", which was initially released to promote the Recess: School's Out film soundtrack, was included as the album's eighth track. The music video features a black and white background in Los Angeles, California with Myra and the dancers dancing with a disc jockey. It was directed by Scott Marshall and choreographed by Darrin Henson. Another version was made where the video is interplaced with clips of closing sequence of the movie and Myra performing against a bluescreen displaying clips of the film. This version was featured at the end of the VHS of the film.

"Lie, Lie, Lie" was released as the second single from the album in Japan, followed by "Step Into the Light". The latter was featured in a commercial for Lux Super Rich shampoo starring Spanish actress Penélope Cruz. "You're the Dream" was chosen as the theme song for Japan's 2002 Special Olympics, which was hosted by Walt Disney Records.

"Like a Girl in Love" was intended to be released a single in the US, following "Miracles Happen", and was included on an EP released in a joint promotion with Toaster Strudel. The song "Hanging Up on You" was featured on Radio Disney's 'Mighty Music CD' included in McDonald's Mighty Kids Meal packages.

== Reception ==
Despite live performances and several TV appearances at the time, Myra failed to be a charting success, and only appeared at on the Top Heatseekers chart, peaking at number 47. Allmusic rated the album three out of five stars.

== Track listing ==
No.	Title	Writer(s)	Producer(s)	Length
1.	"Lie, Lie, Lie"	Lauren Christy; Adrian Gurvitz	The Matrix	3:16
2.	"Candy Boy"	Christy; Graham Edwards; Scott Spock	The Matrix	2:51
3.	"Like a Girl in Love"	Chris Hamm (Note: Music and lyrics); Alain Bertoni (Note: Lyrics only); Laura Zonka	Hamm; Bertoni (Note: Produced for Orange Entertainment.)	3:23
4.	"Miracles Happen (When You Believe)"	Pam Sheyne; Eliot Kennedy	Hamm	5:05
5.	"Bye-Bye My Love"	Hamm; Bertoni	Hamm; Bertoni	3:28
6.	"25 Hours a Day"	Mark Mueller; Guy Roche	Roche	4:34
7.	"Wishing on the Same Star"	Diane Warren	Khris Kellow; Bill Meyers (Note: Produced for Studio D Productions. Executive producer Diane Warren.)	3:28
8.	"Dancing in the Street"	Marvin Gaye; Ivy Jo Hunter; William "Mickey" Stevenson	Keith "K.C." Cohen (Note: Executive producers Jay Landers and Matt Walker.)	3:55
9.	"Where You At?"	Hamm; Bertoni; Zonka	Hamm; Bertoni	3:48
10.	"Girls Like Boyz"	Cohen	Cohen	3:41
11.	"As If"	Roche; Shelly Peiken	The Matrix	3:00
12.	"Hanging Up on You"	Peter "Swee' Pea" McEvilley; Aaron Fishbein; Myra; Sam Conti; Steve Guinn	McEvilley; Fishbein (Note: Produced for Swee' Pea Productions.)	3:02
13.	"Dreams"	Jon Gibson; Conti	Guinn; Conti; McEvilley	3:55

Japanese edition bonus tracks
No.	Title	Writer(s)	Remixer	Length
14.	"Lie, Lie, Lie" (main stream mix)	Christy; Gurvitz	Akira Yokota	5:10
15.	"Lie, Lie, Lie" (Schweitzer mix)	Christy; Gurvitz	Selju Honmach	7:11
16.	"Lie, Lie, Lie" (DJ Akim in the 90's mix)	Christy; Gurvitz	DJ Akim	5:40

Myra+More (2002)
No.	Title	Writer(s)	Producer(s)	Length
1.	"Step Into the Light"	Michelle Hart; Marc Hugenburger; Catte Adams	Hart; Hugenburger	4:28
14.	"You're the Dream" (Theme from the Special Olympics)	John Kavanaugh	Paul Freeman; Bob Wackerman	4:28

Tracks 2–13 of Myra+More are those of the original album, with "Wishing on the Same Star" removed. Tracks 14–16 of the original Japanese release appear as tracks 15–17.

== Charts ==
Chart performance for Myra
Chart (2002)	Peak position
US Top Heatseekers (Billboard)	47
