= Reality (Dream album) =

Studio album by Dream
- Released: 2003
- Recorded: 2001–2003
- Genre: Pop; R&B
- Length: 57:40 (original version); 41:10 (iTunes release)
- Label: Universal (2003); Bad Boy; Clockwork Entertainment; 2620 Music (2008)
- Producer: Scott Storch; The Underdogs; Sean Combs; Rodney "Darkchild" Jerkins; Wade Robson; Mario Winans; Nathan "N8" Walton

Dream chronology
It Was All a Dream (2001)	Reality (2003)

Singles from Reality
- 1. "Crazy" Released: June 2003

Reality is the second and final studio album by American pop group Dream. The album did not see a wide release and was only released for digital download in 2003 from the French Virgin Megastore website; it remained unreleased elsewhere until 2008, when it became available on the United States iTunes Store.

== Production ==
Dream returned to the recording studio to work on the follow-up to It Was All a Dream in late 2001. For this album, Dream teamed up with producers such as Scott Storch, Sean Combs, Darkchild and The Underdogs. Halfway through the recording process, Melissa Schuman left Dream to pursue acting in April 2002 and was replaced by Kasey Sheridan in the early fall of 2002. Production was completed by early 2003.

== Release and promotion ==
Dream returned to the music scene with a sexier image in June 2003 with the release of the album's first single, "Crazy" (featuring Loon). The song did not receive the acclaim and popularity of the group's debut single "He Loves U Not" and its accompanying music video caused controversy due to member Kasey Sheridan's provocative dancing because many thought she was too young to be dancing in a suggestive way (she was only 16 years old at the time, while the other members were 17 and 18 years old).

Reality was originally due for a May 2003 release but was pushed back numerous times (including an October 28, 2003 release schedule, as found in the booklet of Bad Boy's Da Band's Too Hot for TV) until, ultimately, Dream was dropped from Bad Boy Records. Because of this, plans for "That's OK" to be released as a second single were also cancelled. Reality was only released for purchase from the French Virgin Megastore website and on May 13, 2008, Reality became available for digital purchase on the United States iTunes Store. The album has since been removed off the iTunes Store for unknown reasons.

== Track listing ==
#	Title	Time
1	"Diana (Interlude)"	0:51
2	"Why Me?"	3:41
3	"That's OK" (featuring Fabolous; produced by Underdogs)	4:20
4	"Crazy" (featuring Loon; prod. by Scott Storch)	4:01
5	"Hard 2 Stop" (prod. by Darkchild)	3:42
6	"The Real Me"	3:30
7	"What It Is You're Feeling"	3:38
8	"Bring It Back"^	3:57
9	"Holly (Interlude)"	1:26
10	"Sitting Here"	3:53
11	"Clap"	3:26
12	"Promise Me"^	4:11
13	"Kasey (Interlude)"	0:40
14	"It Could Happen"^	4:11
15	"Controlled"	4:25
16	"Ashley (Interlude)"	0:55
17	"I Am Woman"	3:27

^ Not included on the iTunes version of the album.
