= Totally Hits 2005 =

Compilation album by Various artists
- Released: May 17, 2005
- Recorded: Various times
- Genre: Pop
- Length: 75:18
- Label: Warner Music Group/Sony BMG

Series chronology
Totally Hits 2004, Vol. 2 (2004)	Totally Hits 2005 (2005)	Only Hits Vol. 1 (2006)

Professional ratings
Review scores
Source	Rating
AllMusic	4/5 stars

Totally Hits 2005 is an album in the Totally Hits album series.

== Track listing ==
1. Kelly Clarkson – "Since U Been Gone" 3:09
2. Gavin DeGraw – "I Don't Want to Be" 3:36
3. Mario – "Let Me Love You" 4:14
4. Ciara featuring Missy Elliott – "1, 2 Step" 3:24
5. Alicia Keys – "Karma" 3:38
6. Fat Joe – "So Much More" 4:00
7. Trillville featuring Cutty – "Some Cut" 4:14
8. T.I. – "Bring 'Em Out" 3:37
9. Fabolous – "Breathe" 4:30
10. Fantasia – "Truth Is" 3:53
11. Maroon 5 – "Sunday Morning" 4:02
12. Ryan Cabrera – "True" 3:24
13. Avril Lavigne – "Nobody's Home" 3:32
14. Simple Plan – "Shut Up!" 3:01
15. Trick Daddy – "Let's Go" 3:43
16. Cassidy – "I'm a Hustla" 4:05
17. Rupee – "Tempted to Touch" 3:43
18. Tyler Hilton – "When It Comes" 3:45
19. Anthony Hamilton – "Charlene" 4:09
20. Tweet featuring Missy Elliott – "Turn da Lights Off" 3:39
