= Miracles Happen (When You Believe) =

Single by Myra

from the album Myra and The Princess Diaries: Original Soundtrack
- Released: July 24, 2001
- Recorded: Orange Studios
- Genre: Pop
- Length: 5:05
- Label: Buena Vista; Walt Disney; Avex Trax
- Songwriters: Pam Sheyne; Elliot Kennedy; Marco Marinangeli (Spanish version)
- Producer: Chris Hamm

Myra singles chronology
"Dancing in the Street" (2001)	"Miracles Happen (When You Believe)" (2001)	"Lie, Lie, Lie" (2002)

Music video
- "Miracles Happen (When You Believe)" on YouTube

"Miracles Happen (When You Believe)" is a song by American singer Myra. It was the first single from her 2001 self-titled album Myra. The song was used in the 2001 Disney film The Princess Diaries. In 2002, the song was nominated for an ALMA Award for "Outstanding Song in a Motion Picture Soundtrack".

A Spanish version of the song called "Siempre Hay Milagros" was also released with new lyrics co-written by Marco Marinangeli.

"Miracles Happen (When You Believe)" is written and composed in the key of E major and is set in time signature of common time with a tempo of 112 beats per minute. Myra's vocal range spans from G♯_{3} to F_{5}

== Music video ==
The music video directed by Scott Marshall was released to promote Myra as well as the film. It was shot at the Valencia Town Center mall in California and features Myra and some girls going to Limited Too for a fashion and shopping spree and to meet with boys. It was choreographed by Darrin Henson and featured four background dancers whom also accompanied Myra in her live concert and television performances of the song.

In 2002, another music video was released for the Spanish version, "Siempre Hay Milagros". The new music video was directed by Brian Smith and produced by Braddon Mendelson. The 2002 version borrowed clips from its original English version.

== Track listing ==
- Australian single
1. "Miracles Happen (When You Believe)" – 5:05
2. "Dancing in the Street" - 3:55

== Charts ==
Chart performance for "Miracles Happen (When You Believe)"
Chart (2001)	Peak position
Australia (ARIA)	88
