= Up Close and Personal (Angie Martinez album) =

Studio album by Angie Martinez
- Released: April 17, 2001
- Length: 62:23
- Label: Elektra
- Producer: Armegeddon; Big Jack; Bink!; Brian "BK" Coleman; Domingo; Knobody; The Neptunes; Salaam Remi; Rockwilder; JT; Visible

Angie Martinez chronology
Up Close and Personal (2001)	Animal House (2002)

Up Close and Personal is the debut studio album by American rapper Angie Martinez. It was released by Elektra Records on April 17, 2001 in the United States. The album includes the singles "Dem Thangz" and "Coast 2 Coast (Suavemente)".

== Critical reception ==
Professional ratings
Review scores
Source	Rating
AllMusic	4/5 stars
Blender	2/5 stars
Los Angeles Times	3/4 stars
RapReviews	7.5/10
XXL	M (2/5)
Yahoo! Music UK	5/10

AllMusic editor Kerry L. Smith found that "Martinez stands her ground when rapping alongside mega-rap stars like these on her debut album, Up Close and Personal [...] Martinez shines on tracks like "Gutter to tha Fancy Ish," on which she flaunts her quick-tongued rap technique and a tough-girl attitude while alternating verses with none other than Busta Rhymes [...] On her first time around, Martinez has delivered a well-rounded album that features solid raps, Latin grooves, and a few lighter, melodic tunes." Blender critic Neil Drumming found that "Martinez’s debut is anything but intimate [...] In the end, the self-proclaimed "Voice of New York" is almost drowned out by more talented guests Busta Rhymes, Snoop Dogg and Mary J. Blige. It doesn’t help that Martinez is a stiff and inexperienced rapper. Striving for Jay-Z–style cool, she achieves only dispassionate blandness. Martinez clearly makes a better radio personality than a performer. On the radio, at least, she has a personality."

== Track listing ==
No.	Title	Producer(s)	Length
1.	"Heart and Soul" (Interlude)		0:27
2.	"New York, New York" (featuring Prodigy & DJ Clue)	Big Jack; Brian "BK" Coleman	4:12
3.	"Every Little Girl" (featuring The Product G&B)	Justin "JT" Trugman; Salaam Remi^{[a]}	4:30
4.	"Coast 2 Coast (Suavemente)" (featuring Wyclef Jean)	Domingo; Remi^{[a]}	3:26
5.	"Ladies & Gents" (featuring Snoop Dogg)	Remi; The Chameleon	4:19
6.	"Gutter 2 the Fancy Shit" (featuring Busta Rhymes)	Knobody	1:56
7.	"Back from Cuba" (Interlude)		0:28
8.	"Live at Jimmy's" (featuring Big Pun, Cuban Link, Domingo & Sunkiss)	Remi; The Chameleon	5:36
9.	"Silly Niggaz" (Interlude) (featuring Uneek)		2:16
10.	"No Playaz" (featuring Lil' Mo & Tony Sunshine)	Remi; The Chameleon	4:19
11.	"Breathe" (featuring Mary J. Blige & La India)	Remi; The Chameleon	3:32
12.	"Live from the Streets" (featuring Jadakiss, Styles P, Beanie Sigel, Brett & Kool G Rap)	Knobody	1:07
13.	"Go!! (Muthafucka)"	Visible; Remi^{[a]}	4:19
14.	"Thug Love" (featuring Fat Joe & Layzie Bone)	Armegeddon; Remi^{[a]}	3:45
15.	"Mi Amor" (featuring Jay-Z)	Rockwilder	2:57
16.	"Ladies Fight" (Interlude) (featuring Cocoa Chanelle & DJ Jazzy Joyce)		0:59
17.	"Dem Thangz" (featuring Pharrell & Q-Tip)	The Neptunes; Remi^{[a]}	4:17
18.	"Coast 2 Coast" (Suavemente Remix) (featuring Wyclef Jean)	Domingo; Remi^{[a]}; Bink^{[b]}	8:12

Notes

- ^{^[a]} denotes additional producer
- ^{^[b]} denotes remix producer
- "Coast 2 Coast (Suavemente Remix)" contains the untitled hidden track "No Playaz (Remix)" featuring Lil' Mo & Tony Sunshine.

Sample credits

- "Heart & Soul (Interlude)" samples "Native New Yorker" by Odyssey.
- "New York, New York" samples "Cathedral" by Galt MacDermot.
- "Every Little Girl" samples "Fragile" by Sting.
- "Coast 2 Coast (Suavemente)" & "Coast 2 Coast (Suavemente - Remix)" samples "Suavemente" by Elvis Crespo.
- "Ladies & Gents" samples "Nipple To The Bottle" by Grace Jones.
- "Gutter 2 The Fancy Shit" samples "Can't Find The Judge" by Gary Wright.
- "Live At Jimmy's" samples "Jimmy" by Boogie Down Productions "Kokomo (song)" by The Beach Boys.
- "Breathe" samples "Disco Circus" by Martin Circus & "Walking Into Sunshine" by Central Line (band).
- "Live From The Streets" samples Laying The Trap" by Charles Bernstein & "Spanish Town" by Garland Jeffreys.
- "Thug Love" samples "One Love" by Whodini.

== Charts ==
Chart (2001)	Peak position
US Billboard 200	32
US Top R&B/Hip-Hop Albums (Billboard)	7
