= Animal House (Angie Martinez album) =

Studio album by Angie Martinez
- Released: August 20, 2002
- Length: 46:17
- Label: Elektra
- Producer: Buckwild; Cool & Dre; Dirty Swift; Salaam Remi; Rick Rock; Ski; Scott Storch

Angie Martinez chronology
Up Close and Personal (2001)	Animal House (2002)

Singles from Animal House
- 1. "If I Could Go!" Released: May 21, 2002; 2. "Take You Home" Released: January 21, 2003

Animal House is the second and final studio album by American rapper Angie Martinez. It was released by Elektra Records on August 20, 2002 in the United States. The album was co-written by Sacario and features guest appearances by Missy Elliott, Fat Joe, Petey Pablo, Sacario, Kelis, N.O.R.E and Tony Sunshine. Animal House sold 62,000 units in its first week of release and debuted at number six on Billboard's Top R&B/Hip-Hop Albums and number 11 on the Billboard 200 chart. Lead single "If I Could Go" featuring Sacario and Lil Mo became Martinez's biggest-selling single to date.

== Critical reception ==
Professional ratings
Review scores
Source	Rating
AllMusic	1.5/5 stars
RapReviews.com	(7.5/10)

AllMusic editor Michael Gallucci rated the album one and a half a stars out of five. He wrote: "Martinez's day job is as a DJ at a N.Y.C. hip-hop station, and her second album is reason enough for her not to quit. Devoid of style and anything to say, Martinez merely recites her rhymes over flaccid beats, hoping to hook on to something. She falls into nearly all of hip-hop's traps (thankfully, she keeps Animal House at a reasonable 45 minutes): overwrought R&B choruses, lame-ass skits, and "featured" turns by guest-rapping B-listers."

== Track listing ==
No.	Title	Writer(s)	Producer(s)	Length
1.	"Animal House" (featuring Sacario)	Angie Martinez; Anthony Best; Jamar Austin	Buckwild	4:34
2.	"A New Day" (Skit)	Martinez; Scott Storch	Storch	4:27
3.	"TRL (Skit)"			0:27
4.	"If I Could Go!" (featuring Lil' Mo & Sacario)	Martinez; Cynthia Loving; Austin; Ricardo Thomas	Rick Rock	5:03
5.	"Never"	Martinez; Kevin Risto	Dirty Swift	3:39
6.	"Take You Home" (featuring Kelis)	Martinez; Andre Lyon; Marcello Valenzano; Kelis Rogers	Cool & Dre	3:59
7.	"Been Around the World" (Skit)			1:22
8.	"We Can Get It On" (featuring N.O.R.E.)	Martinez; Lyon; Valenzano; Victor Santiago, Jr.	Cool & Dre	3:36
9.	"What's That Sound" (featuring Missy Elliott)	Martinez; Lyon; Valenzano; Melissa Elliott	Cool & Dre	3:18
10.	"Fucked Up Situation" (featuring Tony Sunshine)	Martinez; Antonio Cruz; David Willis	Ski	3:40
11.	"Waitin' On" (featuring Petey Pablo)	Martinez; Lyon; Valenzano; Moses Barrett III	Cool & Dre	3:29
12.	"Lifestyles of the Big and Famous"			1:07
13.	"Live Big" (Remix) (featuring Fat Joe & Sacario)	Martinez; Anhtony Golding; Austin; Joseph Cartagena	Ant Boogie	3:44
14.	"So Good" (featuring Keon Bryce)	Martinez; Bryce; Salaam Remi	Remi	4:42

== Charts ==
Chart (2002)	Peak position
US Billboard 200	11
US Top R&B/Hip-Hop Albums (Billboard)	6
