= Totally Hits 2003 =

Compilation album by Various artists
- Released: October 7, 2003
- Recorded: Various times
- Genre: Pop
- Label: BMG Heritage

Series chronology
| Totally Hip Hop (2003) | Totally Hits 2003 (2003) | Totally Hits 2004 (2004) |

Professional ratings
Review scores
| Source | Rating |
|---|---|
| Allmusic | 3/5 stars |

Totally Hits 2003 is an album in the Totally Hits series. The album contains the number-one Billboard Hot 100 single, "This Is the Night" by Clay Aiken.

== Track listing ==
1. Kelly Clarkson - "Miss Independent" 3:33
2. Michelle Branch - "Are You Happy Now?" 3:47
3. Santana featuring Alex Band of The Calling - "Why Don't You & I" 3:45
4. Fabolous featuring Tamia - "Into You" 4:18
5. R. Kelly featuring Cam'ron and Big Tigger - "Snake (Remix)" 4:26
6. Monica - "So Gone" 3:21
7. Jason Mraz - "The Remedy (I Won't Worry)" 4:10
8. Jewel - "Intuition" 3:48
9. Clay Aiken - "This Is the Night" 3:32
10. Ruben Studdard - "Flying Without Wings" 3:42
11. Justin Timberlake - "Cry Me a River" 4:48
12. Sean Paul - "Like Glue" 3:51
13. Simple Plan - "Addicted" 3:52
14. Avril Lavigne - "Sk8er Boi" 3:23
15. Trapt - "Headstrong" 3:54
16. Uncle Kracker - "In a Little While" 4:04
17. Christina Aguilera - "Fighter" 4:07
18. Missy Elliott - "Work It" 4:22
19. Blu Cantrell featuring Sean Paul - "Breathe" 3:48
20. Luther Vandross - "Dance with My Father" 4:19

== Certifications ==
| Region | Certification | Certified units/sales |
|---|---|---|
| United States (RIAA) | Gold | 500,000^{^} |
^{^} Shipments figures based on certification alone.
