= Your Crowning Glory =

Song by Julie Andrews and Raven-Symoné

from the album The Princess Diaries 2: Royal Engagement
- Released: 2004
- Genre: Pop
- Length: 2:35
- Label: Walt Disney
- Songwriters: Lorraine Feather; Larry Grossman

"Your Crowning Glory" is a song from the 2004 Disney film The Princess Diaries 2: Royal Engagement, sung by Julie Andrews (as Queen Clarisse) and Raven-Symoné (as Princess Asana). It is notable for being the first time Julie Andrews sang in film following her 1997 botched throat surgery. Intermittent singing in films had used old recordings of her.

== In the film ==
Within the context of the film, the song is one that Princess Amelia (Anne Hathaway) had heard in childhood; she asks her grandmother to sing it as she heads to adulthood and marriage. Clarisse sings it at a slumber party for Amelia and the other guests, before being joined by Asana after the remixed second verse starts to play.

== Development ==
Andrews had initially resisted the idea of singing in The Princess Diaries 2, feeling that it would come across to audiences as gimmicky, as well as slow down the action. She was eventually convinced by her husband Blake Edwards and director Garry Marshall, on the condition that she would have the right to cut the number if she felt it did not fit within the film. Andrews then personally chose Larry Grossman to work on the film's music, and he constructed a song that was written in a single octave to avoid it being vocally demanding for the actress.

"I wish I could call it singing. I don't want to mislead anyone. I really would like it to be made very clear that, in fact, it isn't singing. It's sort of speak-singing, singing-speak."

— Julie Andrews, to The Spokesman

Andrews asked him to keep the song simple, low, and within her 5-note range. Lyricist Lorraine Feather described the song as "old-fashioned ... with classic-type lyrics." Music supervisor Dawn Soler described the piece as having a classic song structure, with a hip-hop feel. Andrews begins the song in a talk-sing style, then transitions to singing with a limited vocal range and noticeably raspy tone.

Andrews added the idea of a back-and-forth banter between her character and Raven's. Trained soprano Hathaway, who had recently had a singing role in Ella Enchanted, abstained from singing in the number; one reason was that she did not think her character was one to break into song.

In terms of staging, Andrews insisted that the number be deliberately impromptu, rather than a huge, show-stopping performance. Over 250 people (from both the film's soundstage and the surrounding ones) were present to watch Andrews's performance. Marshall said the song made those on the set "deeply moved" and "teary-eyed". Raven called the experience of singing with one of her "very favorite performers" an "experience of a lifetime"; meanwhile, Andrews recalled the set that day being "lively and full of energy".

== Critical reception ==
Billboard thought the duet was awkward and didn't quite fit into the overall soundtrack. After, the site would later comment that the moment was significant in the context of Andrews's career: "Although she downplayed this return to singing, that is exactly what it was, demonstrating that she had made at least a partial recovery from her botched throat surgery." Cinema Review deemed it a "highlight" and "memorable". Deseret News thought Andrews's music moment was "botched" by the "irksome" Raven. The St Albans Review thought the number demonstrated that Andrews had not "given up on her voice".
