= Totally Hits, Vol. 2 =

Compilation album by Various Artists
- Released: May 30, 2000
- Recorded: Various Times
- Genre: Pop
- Length: 72:29
- Label: Elektra/Asylum

Totally Hits chronology
Totally Hits (1999)	Totally Hits, Vol. 2 (2000)	Totally Hits, Vol. 3 (2000)

Professional ratings
Review scores
Source	Rating
Allmusic	3/5 stars

Totally Hits 2 is an album in the Totally Hits series. The album contains three Billboard Hot 100 number-one hits: "Maria Maria", "Genie in a Bottle", and "Amazed".

== Track listing ==
1. Santana featuring The Product G&B – "Maria Maria" 4:07
2. Christina Aguilera – "Genie in a Bottle" 3:38
3. Third Eye Blind – "Never Let You Go" 3:58
4. Sugar Ray – "Falls Apart" 4:17
5. Lonestar – "Amazed" 4:02
6. Lou Bega – "Mambo No. 5 (A Little Bit of...)" 3:40
7. Madonna – "Beautiful Stranger" 4:22
8. Whitney Houston – "My Love Is Your Love" (Jonathan Peters Radio Mix) 4:32
9. Filter – "Take a Picture" 4:22
10. TLC – "Dear Lie" 4:39
11. Missy Elliott – "Hot Boyz" 3:31
12. Moby – "Natural Blues" 3:02
13. LFO – "Girl on TV" 4:09
14. NSYNC – "Thinking of You (I Drive Myself Crazy)" 3:59
15. Donell Jones – "U Know What's Up" 4:03
16. Monica featuring 112 – "Right Here Waiting" 4:15
17. R.E.M. – "The Great Beyond" 4:13
18. Sarah McLachlan – "I Will Remember You" 3:40

== Certifications ==
Region	Certification	Certified units/sales
United States (RIAA)	Platinum	1,000,000^{^}
^{^} Shipments figures based on certification alone.
