= Totally Country Vol. 5 =

Compilation album by Various Artists
- Released: February 7, 2006
- Recorded: Various Times
- Genre: Country music
- Length: 1:05:43
- Label: Sony BMG

Totally Country chronology
Totally Country Vol. 4 (2005)	Totally Country Vol. 5 (2006)	Totally Country Vol. 6 (2007)

Professional ratings
Review scores
Source	Rating
Allmusic	link

Totally Country Vol. 5 is an album in the Totally Hits series, which features 17 country singles from 2004 to 2006.

== Track listing ==
1. "Kerosene" – Miranda Lambert (3:07)
2. "Homewrecker" – Gretchen Wilson (3:27)
3. "How Am I Doin'" – Dierks Bentley (3:49)
4. "Comin' to Your City" – Big & Rich (3:30)
5. "Suds in the Bucket" – Sara Evans (3:48)
6. "Help Somebody" – Van Zant (4:14)
7. "I Play Chicken with the Train" – Cowboy Troy with Big & Rich (3:18)
8. "You Do Your Thing" – Montgomery Gentry (3:43)
9. "Redneck Yacht Club" – Craig Morgan (3:49)
10. "XXL" – Keith Anderson (3:45)
11. "My Kind of Music" – Ray Scott (3:01)
12. "You're Like Comin' Home" – Lonestar (4:01)
13. "Goodbye Time" – Blake Shelton (3:26)
14. "Hicktown" – Jason Aldean (5:08)
15. "God's Will" – Martina McBride (5:51)
16. "If Heaven" – Andy Griggs (3:33)
17. "It's Getting Better All the Time" – Brooks & Dunn (4:13)
18. "I Hate Everything" - George Strait (3:55)
19. "Living in Fast Forward" - Kenny Chesney (3:31)
20. "Mud on the Tires" - Brad Paisley (3:28)

== Charts ==
=== Weekly charts ===
Chart (2006)	Peak position
US Billboard 200	17
US Top Country Albums (Billboard)	4

=== Year-end charts ===
Chart (2006)	Position
US Top Country Albums (Billboard)	41
