= Totally Hits =

Compilation album series

Totally Hits was a series of various artists compilation albums released in collaboration with BMG and Warner Music Group, intending to showcase some of the most popular hit songs of the time. The series was intended to rival EMI and UMG's Now That's What I Call Music! series.

For the first volume, a massive ad campaign was launched, with both record labels putting out TV spots, Internet ads, and promotions for the release. Label executives referred to it as "the definitive collection of 1998 and 1999 hit singles," and "the first multi-format collection to boast virtually an entire program of bonafide crossover smashes." The first volume debuted and peaked at #14 on the Billboard Top 200 and received favorable reviews from Robert Christgau and Entertainment Weekly, who preferred it to Now! 3.

The first release was distributed by BMG's Arista Records. Prior to Totally Hits, Arista had been releasing various artists compilations known as the Ultimate series for the past four years. Arista executive vice president Charles Goldstuck claimed he wanted to "expand the franchise. We thought we'd be better off with a partner, so we could source the right repertoire and end up with as strong a compilation as possible to give the consumer complete value." Warner CEO Roger Ames accepted, and a track listing was put together in only a couple of months.

After the release of the first volume, follow-up installments were numbered and contained hits from the few months prior to each album's release. This practice was abandoned after the release of Totally Hits 3 in November 2000. The main series then shifted to a yearly format, with the tracks featured on Totally Hits 2001 covering the entirety of that year. This practice then changed again in 2002, with the release of two volumes - Totally Hits 2002 and Totally Hits 2002: More Platinum Hits - with the former released during the first half of the year and the latter released during the second half. The yearly format was picked up again in 2003, which saw the only main entry in the series, Totally Hits 2003, released at the end of the year. 2004 saw the release of Totally Hits 2004 and Totally Hits 2004, Vol. 2, while the only release the main series saw for 2005, Totally Hits 2005, saw a release in May of that year. It would be the final main entry to be branded as a Totally Hits album. A Totally Hits 2006 compilation was planned, but never released. Instead, Warner would go on to release an abbreviated 12-track compilation, Only Hits, as a successor. No follow-ups were released.

The final release under the Totally Hits brand, Totally Country, Vol. 6, was released in January 2007.

== Titles ==
- Totally Hits (released November 9, 1999), first main series
- Totally Hits, Vol. 2 (May 30, 2000), second main series
- Totally Hits, Vol. 3 (November 14, 2000), third main series
- Totally Dance (June 26, 2001)
- Totally Hits 2001 (September 25, 2001), fourth main series
- Totally Country (February 5, 2002), first Totally Country series
- Totally Hits 2002 (June 4, 2002), fifth main series
- Totally Hits 2002: More Platinum Hits (October 29, 2002), sixth main series
- Totally Country Vol. 2 (October 29, 2002), second Totally Country series
- Totally R&B (July 1, 2003)
- Totally Hip Hop (July 1, 2003)
- Totally Country Vol. 3 (September 23, 2003), third Totally Country series
- Totally Hits 2003 (October 7, 2003), seventh main series
- Totally Hits 2004 (May 4, 2004), eighth main series
- Totally Hits 2004, Vol. 2 (October 5, 2004), ninth main series
- Totally Country Vol. 4 (February 8, 2005), fourth Totally Country series
- Totally Hits 2005 (May 17, 2005), tenth main series
- Totally Country Vol. 5 (February 7, 2006), fifth Totally Country series
- Only Hits Vol. 1 (November 7, 2006), eleventh main series
- Totally Country Vol. 6 (January 30, 2007), sixth Totally Country series

== See also ==
- Now That's What I Call Music! series
- "Hits" (UK equivalent)
