= Totally Country Vol. 3 =

Compilation album by Various Artists
- Released: September 23, 2003
- Genre: Country music
- Length: 1:03:10
- Label: Warner Bros.

Totally Country chronology
Totally Country Vol. 2 (2002)	Totally Country Vol. 3 (2003)	Totally Country Vol. 4 (2005)

Professional ratings
Review scores
Source	Rating
Allmusic	link

Totally Country Vol. 3 is an album in the Totally Hits series.

== Track listing ==
1. "Unbroken" – Tim McGraw (4:01)
2. "Cry" – Faith Hill (3:48)
3. "Speed" – Montgomery Gentry (4:01)
4. "Three Wooden Crosses" – Randy Travis (3:22)
5. "Blessed" – Martina McBride (4:35)
6. "Love You Out Loud" – Rascal Flatts (3:09)
7. "Beautiful Mess" – Diamond Rio (3:50)
8. "The Baby" – Blake Shelton (3:57)
9. "Was That My Life" – Jo Dee Messina (3:50)
10. "Not a Day Goes By" – Lonestar (4:11)
11. "When You Lie Next to Me" – Kellie Coffey (4:02)
12. "American Child" – Phil Vassar (3:14)
13. "On a Mission" – Trick Pony (3:00)
14. "One Last Time" – Dusty Drake (3:49)
15. "Strong Enough to Be Your Man" – Travis Tritt (3:49)
16. "Life Goes On" – LeAnn Rimes (3:35)
17. "Tonight I Wanna Be Your Man" – Andy Griggs (2:57)

== Charts ==
=== Weekly charts ===
Chart (2003)	Peak position
US Billboard 200	37
US Top Country Albums (Billboard)	2

=== Year-end charts ===
Chart (2003)	Position
US Top Country Albums (Billboard)	60
Chart (2004)	Position
US Top Country Albums (Billboard)	65
