= Totally Country Vol. 6 =

Compilation album by Various Artists
- Released: January 30, 2007
- Genre: Country music
- Length: 1:03:17
- Label: Sony BMG

Totally Country chronology
Totally Country Vol. 5 (2006)	Totally Country Vol. 6 (2007)

Professional ratings
Review scores
Source	Rating
Allmusic	link

Totally Country Vol. 6 is an album in the Totally Hits series.

Much like previous volumes in the Totally Country series, this sixth volume contained recent country hits (roughly, the latter half of 2005 to summer 2006) by the genre's biggest stars of the time, including Brad Paisley, Kenny Chesney, Lonestar, Montgomery Gentry, George Strait and Blake Shelton, and newcomers such as Sugarland and Carrie Underwood. Five of the tracks reached No. 1 on the Billboard Hot Country Songs chart during 2006.

To date, Volume 6 is the last volume to be released in the Totally Country series. Since 2008, various hits compilations of recent country hits began to be issued in the Now! That's What I Call Music series.

== Track listing ==
1. "The World" – Brad Paisley (4:03)
2. "Sunshine and Summertime" – Faith Hill (3:28)
3. "Who You'd Be Today" – Kenny Chesney (4:15)
4. "Don't Forget to Remember Me" – Carrie Underwood (4:02)
5. "Leave the Pieces" – The Wreckers (3:31)
6. "Something More" – Sugarland (3:38)
7. "Life Ain't Always Beautiful" – Gary Allan (3:45)
8. "Mountains" – Lonestar (3:56)
9. "Must Be Doin' Somethin' Right" – Billy Currington (4:30)
10. "Something to Be Proud Of" – Montgomery Gentry (4:17)
11. "Every Time I Hear Your Name" – Keith Anderson (4:23)
12. "Nobody But Me" – Blake Shelton (2:39)
13. "Last Day of My Life" – Phil Vassar (3:55)
14. "California Girls" – Gretchen Wilson (2:51)
15. "(I Never Promised You a) Rose Garden" – Martina McBride (3:18)
16. "She Let Herself Go" – George Strait (3:18)
17. "8th of November" – Big & Rich (3:28)

== Charts ==
=== Weekly charts ===
Chart (2007)	Peak position
US Billboard 200	18
US Top Country Albums (Billboard)	1

=== Year-end charts ===
Chart (2007)	Position
US Top Country Albums (Billboard)	57
