= Myra (singer) =

American pop singer (born 1986)

- Born: Mayra Ambriz; May 21, 1986 (age 40); Los Angeles, California, U.S.
- Origin: Burbank, California, U.S.
- Genres: Pop
- Occupation: Pop singer
- Years active: 1997–present
- Labels: Buena Vista; Hollywood; Walt Disney

Mayra Ambriz (born May 21, 1986), known mononymously as Myra, is an American pop singer. She is the first Latina artist to sign with Hollywood Records and Walt Disney Records. She is best known for her 2001 singles "Dancing in the Street" for Recess: School's Out and "Miracles Happen (When You Believe)" for the film The Princess Diaries, as well as her role in Max Keeble's Big Move.

== Career ==
In 1997, at age 11, Myra released her first album Mensajera del Amór under the name Mayra Caról.

In May 2000, Myra signed with Walt Disney Records. Her first release under the label was "Magic Carpet Ride", which was released on May 23, 2000 as part of the La Vida Mickey compilation album.

In 2001, Myra recorded a cover of Martha and the Vandellas's "Dancing in the Street" for the soundtrack to the 2001 film Recess: School's Out. The song was later included on her self-titled album Myra which was released on June 26, 2001. The first single from the album, "Miracles Happen (When You Believe)", was also featured in the film The Princess Diaries. In October 2001, Myra made an appearance in the film Max Keeble's Big Move as Chelsea. During this time, she toured with Aaron Carter, opening for his 2000-2001 "Party" Tour. She was also a featured artist during the Radio Disney Live! 2001 World Tour.

In 2007, Myra was featured on the single "Back to You" by Chicano rapper Veze Skante. The song was included on the compilation album La Costa Nuestra, which also included the Myra track "Get On Your Way". The following year, Myra was featured on "Confessing My Love" by Mal Hablado.

== Personal life ==
Myra is of Mexican descent. In 2011, Myra had a daughter and attended college.

== Discography ==
=== Studio albums ===
Title	Details	Peak chart positions
Title	Details	US Heat
Mensajera del Amór	Released: August 1, 1997; Label: Briza Promotions	-
Myra	Released: June 26, 2001; Label: Buena Vista Records	47
Milagros	Released: October 16, 2001; Label: Hollywood Records	-

=== Extended plays ===
Title	Details
Introducing Myra	Released: 2001; Label: Buena Vista
The Myra Movement: The EP	Released: 2016; Label: Self-released

=== Singles ===
==== As lead artist ====
Title	Year	Peak chart positions	Album
Title	Year	AUS	Album
"Dancing in the Street"	2001	—	Recess: School's Out: Original Movie Soundtrack
"Miracles Happen (When You Believe)"	2001	88	Myra and The Princess Diaries: Original Soundtrack
"Siempre Hay Milagros"	2001	—	Milagros
"Lie, Lie, Lie"	2002	—	Myra
"Step into the Light"	2002	—	Myra

==== As featured artist ====
Title	Year	Album
"Rescue Me" (Rey y Kaye featuring Myra)	2020	Non-album single

=== Other appearances ===
Title	Year	Other artist(s)	Album
"Magic Carpet Ride"	2000	-	La Vida Mickey
"Parte de El (Part of Your World)"	2000	-	The Little Mermaid II: Return to the Sea
"Puppy Love"	2000	-	102 Dalmatians
"Pikachu, Eres Tú"	2001	-	Pokémon the Johto Journeys: Música Original de la Serie de TV, Vol. 2
"Mickey's Got The Beat"	2001	-	Mickey's Dance Party
Christmas Isn't Christmas (Since You Said Goodbye)	2002	-	School's Out!: Christmas
"Very First Christmas Love"	2002	-	School's Out!: Christmas
"One Small Voice"	2002	Taylor Momsen and Camille Winbush	School's Out!: Christmas
"Frosty the Snowman"	2002	-	Radio Disney Holiday Jams
"Back to You"	2007	Veze Skante	La Costa Nuestra
"Get On Your Way"	2007	Sporty Loco	La Costa Nuestra
"Confessing My Love"	2008	Mal Hablado	Bad Mouth

=== Music videos ===
Title	Year	Director
"Dancing in the Street"	2001	Scott Marshall
"Miracles Happen (When You Believe)"	2001	Scott Marshall
"Lie, Lie, Lie"	2002	
"Step into the Light"	2002	
"Back to You"	2007	Jessy Terrero
