= This Is Me (Dream song) =

2001 single by Dream

Single by Dream

from the album It Was All a Dream
- B-side: "He Loves U Not" (remix)
- Released: February 27, 2001
- Studio: Sony (California, US)
- Length: 3:12
- Label: Bad Boy; Arista
- Songwriters: Steve Kipner; David Frank; Pamela Sheyne
- Producer: David Frank

Dream singles chronology
"He Loves U Not" (2000)	"This Is Me" (2001)	"This Is Me (Remix)" (2001)

Music video
- "This Is Me" on YouTube

"This Is Me" is the name of two songs by American girl group Dream. The original song was released on February 27, 2001, as the second single from their debut album It Was All a Dream (2001). It was written in by Steve Kipner, David Frank and Pamela Sheyne, the same team that wrote their debut single "He Loves U Not". A second song with the same title but different lyrics and production, labeled "This Is Me (Remix)", was released in the United States on July 2, 2001, as the group's third single. "This Is Me (Remix)" features rapper Kain and was produced by Sean Combs and Mario Winans, both of whom also co-wrote the song.

An accompanying music video for the song was directed by Marcus Raboy and premiered on MTV's Total Request Live. They first performed the song live on Live with Regis and Kelly and would make later appearances at the 2001 Walt Disney World Summer Jam Concert, Teen Choice Presents: Teenapalooza and The Early Show.

The original song was a minor hit on the Billboard Hot 100, peaking within the top 40 at number 39, making this their second and final song to appear on that chart.

== Background ==
Written by the same team that had produced their previous hit single, "This Is Me" again featured lead vocals by Holly Blake-Arnstein. The rap interlude was alternately sung and spoken by Ashley Poole and Melissa Schuman, respectively.

== Chart performance ==
Though not as big of a hit as "He Loves U Not," "This Is Me" received some chart success. It peaked at number five on the US Hot Dance/Maxi-Single Sales chart, number 39 on the Billboard Hot 100 for the week of June 9, 2001, and number 80 on the Hot R&B/Hip-Hop Singles & Tracks chart for the week of July 27. It also peaked at number 47 on the New Zealand Singles Chart, spending three weeks on the chart.

== Music video ==
The music video for "This Is Me" was shot February 20 and 21, 2001, and directed by Marcus Raboy, who had also directed Dream's first video. The first setting depicted each Dream member in a different colored room: red for Holly, gold for Melissa, blue for Diana, and white for Ashley. In the second setting, the girls danced in a rave, with Ashley and Diana performing solo dance breaks. In the third setting, the girls emerged from a limousine and performed in a crowded dance club. The video debuted at number 10 on MTV's countdown show Total Request Live (TRL) on April 20, 2001. The video peaked at number one on May 2, 2001, making them the first girl group to reach that spot on the countdown.

== Live performances ==
Dream first performed "This Is Me" along with "When I Get There" on Live with Regis and Kelly on March 27, 2001. On June 10, they performed this and "He Loves U Not" at the 2001 Walt Disney World Summer Jam Concert, aboard the Disney Wonder cruise ship in the Bahamas. A week later, they performed it at Wango Tango, an annual all-day concert organized by KIIS-FM, in California. Troy J. Augusto of Variety put their performance alongside Eden's Crush and Vertical Horizon's, saying that they were "easy to forget." On June 20, they performed it at Teen Choice Presents: Teenapalooza. Five days later, they appeared on The Early Show on June 25, 2001, to perform this and "He Loves U Not".

== "This Is Me (Remix)" ==
"This Is Me (Remix)"

Single by Dream featuring Kain
- Released: July 2, 2001
- Studio: Sony (California, US)
- Length: 4:08
- Label: Bad Boy; Arista
- Songwriters: Sean Combs; Mario Winans; M. Jones; Taurian Shropshire; M. Weinberg
- Producers: P. Diddy; Mario Winans

Dream featuring Kain singles chronology
"This Is Me" (2001)	"This Is Me (Remix)" (2001)	"Crazy" (2003)

A second song with the same title but different lyrics and production, labeled as "This Is Me (Remix)" was released on July 2, 2001, as the group's third single and features rapper Kain. "This Is Me (Remix)" was written by an entirely different group of writers than those that wrote "This Is Me". "This Is Me (Remix)" was produced by Sean Combs and Mario Winans, both of whom also co-wrote the song, and samples "Take Me to the Mardi Gras" by Bob James. Though they were not credited, the vocals on the song were produced by the group members themselves. It was regularly performed live during MTV's Total Request Live Tour. The song received a negative review from Stephen Thomas Erlewine, who called it a "second-tier single".

In the United States, both "This Is Me (Remix)" and "This Is Me" were released on the same commercial CD single; internationally, only the original "This Is Me" was released. While "This Is Me" was released to both contemporary hit radio and rhythmic contemporary radio in the United States, "This Is Me (Remix)" was only released to the latter. "This Is Me (Remix)" did not chart separately from "This Is Me", but the physical maxi single peaked at number 5 on the Billboard Dance Singles Sales chart. "This Is Me (Remix)" was later included on the compilation Totally Hits 2001.

=== Music video ===
The video for "This Is Me (Remix)" was directed by Chris Robinson and featured two settings: In the first setting, the girls, sporting "Bad Girl" T-shirts, are dancing in a blue and white room with P. Diddy also dancing with the girls. The second setting had them in a black room, with Kain performing with the girls and P. Diddy. A dance break by P. Diddy is also featured in both settings of the video, intercut with scenes of Mario Winans playing the drums.

== Track listings ==
US CD single

1. "This Is Me" (Remix) (featuring Kain) – 4:08
2. "This Is Me" (Mike Rizzo's Hyper Mix) – 3:32

US maxi-CD single

1. "This Is Me" (Remix) (featuring Kain) – 4:38
2. "This Is Me" (Mike Rizzo's Hyper Mix) – 3:32
3. "This Is Me" (Urban Remix) – 4:19
4. "He Loves U Not" (Remix) (featuring G-Dep) – 3:49

International CD single

1. "This Is Me" (Radio Mix) – 3:15
2. "This Is Me" (P. Diddy Mix) – 4:25
3. "This Is Me" (Mike Rizzo's Hyper Mix) – 3:32
4. "This Is Me" (Instrumental) – 3:11
- Track 3 is misprinted as being the "extended club" version of the Mike Rizzo mix. It is actually the short edit of this remix.

== Credits and personnel ==
Credits are adapted from the liner notes of It Was All a Dream.

Recording

- Recorded and engineered at Canyon Reverb, The Village Recorder, and Digital Insight (California)
- Mixed at Larrabee Recording Studios (California)

Personnel

- Dave Way – mixing
- Ryan Freeman – production assistance
- Jon Griffin – production coordination
- David Frank – keyboards, drums, writing
- Steve Kipner – keyboards, drums, writing
- Pamela Sheyne – writing
- James SK Wān – bamboo flute
- Sue Anne Carwell – additional vocal arrangement

== Charts ==
=== Weekly charts ===
Chart (2001)	Peak position
New Zealand (Recorded Music NZ)	47
US Billboard Hot 100	39
US Dance Singles Sales (Billboard)	5
US Hot R&B/Hip-Hop Songs (Billboard)	80
US Pop Airplay (Billboard)	13
US Top 40 Tracks (Billboard)	17

=== Year-end charts ===
Chart (2001)	Position
US Mainstream Top 40 (Billboard)	57

Chart (2002)	Position
US Maxi-Singles Sales (Billboard)	24

== Release history ==
"This Is Me"

Region	Date	Format(s)	Label(s)	Ref.
United States	February 27, 2001	Contemporary hit radio	Bad Boy; Arista	
United States	March 6, 2001	Rhythmic contemporary radio	Bad Boy; Arista	
United States	July 3, 2001	CD single	Bad Boy; Arista	
Australia	June 18, 2001	CD single	Bad Boy; Arista	
Sweden	December 25, 2001	CD single	Bad Boy; Arista	

"This Is Me" (Remix)

Region	Date	Format(s)	Label(s)	Ref.
United States	July 2, 2001	Rhythmic contemporary radio	Bad Boy; Arista	
