= Crazy (Dream song) =

Single by Dream featuring Loon

from the album Reality
- Released: June 2, 2003
- Length: 4:00
- Label: Bad Boy
- Songwriters: Thelma Guyton; Chauncey Hawkins; Adonis Shropshire; Scott Storch
- Producers: Scott Storch; Diddy

Dream singles chronology
"This Is Me (Remix)" (2001)	"Crazy" (2003)	"I Believe" (2016)

Loon singles chronology
"Hit the Freeway" (2002)	"Crazy" (2003)	"Down for Me" (2003)

"Crazy" is a song recorded by American girl group Dream featuring rapper Loon. The song was written by Thelma Guyton, Loon, Adonis Shropshire, and Scott Storch, with the song being produced by Storch and P. Diddy. It was released on June 2, 2003, as the lead single for what was supposed to be the group's second studio album Reality (2003). This is the only single to feature Kasey Sheridan as a member of the group.

The song entered the Mainstream Top 40 and Rhythmic charts.

== Content ==
"Crazy" features a guest appearance by rapper Loon.

== Music video ==
The music video took place in a Middle Eastern setting. It showed the girls wearing harem-like costumes and dancing in a very provocative style. According to MTV News, this new "sexed-up" style was not welcomed by the group and was one of the factors that led to their break-up. Matthew Rolston directed the video.

== Charts ==
Chart (2003)	Peak position
US Pop Airplay (Billboard)	39
US Rhythmic Airplay (Billboard)	40

== Release history ==
Release dates and format(s) for "Crazy"
Region	Date	Format(s)	Label(s)	Ref.
United States	June 2, 2003	Contemporary hit radio; Urban contemporary radio	Bad Boy	
