= Totally Hits 2002 =

Compilation album by Various artists
- Released: June 4, 2002
- Genre: Pop
- Label: Warner Music Group/BMG

Various artists chronology
Totally Hits 2001 (2001)	Totally Hits 2002 (2002)	Totally Hits 2002: More Platinum Hits (2002)

Professional ratings
Review scores
Source	Rating
AllMusic	link

Totally Hits 2002 is an album in the Totally Hits series. The album peaked at No. 2 on the Billboard 200. A lip-sync karaoke contest was held at a Tower Records in Los Angeles, California, on June 27, 2002 to promote the album with appearances by radio personality Ellen K, news anchor Mindy Burbano, then-CEO of WMG Kevin Gore, actor AJ Lamas, and actress Kyla Pratt.

== Track listing ==
1. Fat Joe featuring Ashanti – "What's Luv?" (3:51)
2. Tweet featuring Missy Elliott – "Oops (Oh My)" (Radio Edit) (3:55)
3. Pink – "Get the Party Started" (3:10)
4. Brandy – "What About Us?" (Radio Mix) (3:57)
5. Craig David – "7 Days" (3:52)
6. Fabolous – "Young'n (Holla Back)" (3:26)
7. Outkast featuring Killer Mike – "The Whole World" (4:17)
8. Michelle Branch – "Everywhere" (3:33)
9. The Calling – "Wherever You Will Go" (3:25)
10. Default – "Wasting My Time" (4:27)
11. P.O.D. – "Youth of the Nation" (4:04)
12. Alanis Morissette – "Hands Clean" (4:27)
13. Natalie Imbruglia – "Wrong Impression" (4:14)
14. Jewel – "Standing Still" (4:29)
15. O-Town – "We Fit Together" (3:57)
16. Faith Evans – "I Love You" (4:00)
17. Alicia Keys – "A Woman's Worth" (4:16)
18. LeAnn Rimes – "Can't Fight the Moonlight" (Graham Stack Radio Edit) (3:36)
19. Busta Rhymes with P. Diddy & Pharrell – "Pass the Courvoisier, Part II" (4:10)
20. Jaheim featuring Next – "Anything" (4:04)

== Charts ==
=== Weekly charts ===
Chart (2002)	Peak position
US Billboard 200	2

=== Year-end charts ===
Chart (2002)	Position
US Billboard 200	83
Worldwide Albums (IFPI)	48

== Certifications ==
Region	Certification	Certified units/sales
United States (RIAA)	Platinum	1,000,000^{^}
^{^} Shipments figures based on certification alone.
