= Total Request Live Tour =

2001 concert tour

- Continental tour by Various Artists
- Location: North America
- Start date: July 18, 2001
- End date: September 21, 2001
- Legs: 1
- No. of shows: 39 in North America

Various Artists concert chronology
- Total Request Live Tour; Destiny's Child World Tour (2002)

The Total Request Live Tour (also known as MTV's TRL Tour) was a co-headlining tour featuring American groups, 3LW, Destiny's Child, Dream, St. Lunatics and American artists Eve and Nelly. Jessica Simpson joined the tour for select dates before venturing off to her own solo tour. Her slot was later taken by City High.

The tour ran during the summer of 2001, playing over 30 shows in the United States and Canada. Many dates were cancelled as an outcome of the 9/11 attacks. This was the first and only edition of the tour.

== Background ==
MTV first positioned a concert series, featuring various acts performing in major markets throughout the U.S.. The idea was to take big names popular on the network and up and coming acts exposure to an arena-sized audience. In 1999, TLC, Backstreet Boys, Britney Spears were rumored to perform together on an MTV-sponsored tour. However, these plans were never confirmed or denied by MTV.

Destiny's Child served as the headlining act. Newcomers 3LW and Dream were featured alongside Jessica Simpson, Eve and Nelly with the St. Lunatics. Simpson's final show was on August 4, 2001. City High was brought in as a replacement on August 9.

The show followed the TRL format, and featured Solange Knowles as the host and emcee. TRL host Carson Daly was also featured via video screens to introduce the show. In-between acts, music videos and paid advertisements would play on the video screens.

The tour initially was set for nearly 50 shows in the U.S. and Canada. After the 9/11 attacks, several dates were cancelled as a response to security risks for flying. Thus, the last show of the tour was in Denver, Colorado. A special show was planned to honor the victims of the 9/11 attacks, and one of the cancelled shows in Honolulu was reversed. The special show featured Forté and DisGuyz as opening acts and Destiny's Child as the sole headliner.

Due to strong sales, it was believed the tour would formulate into an annual event. A 2002 tour was penciled yet cancelled before any plans were made.

== Opening acts ==
- 3Gs (select dates)
- Lil J (select dates)
- Forté (Honolulu)
- DisGuyz (Honolulu)

== Lineup ==
- 3LW
- Dream
- Jessica Simpson (July 18, 2001—August 4, 2001)
- City High (August 9, 2001—September 9, 2001)
- Eve
- Nelly and the St. Lunatics
- Destiny's Child

== Set lists ==
The following set lists are obtained from the July 18, 2001 concert at the Pepsi Arena in Albany, New York. It does not represent all concerts throughout the tour.

3LW

1. "Warning" (dance intro)
2. "Playas Gon' Play"
3. "No More (Baby I'ma Do Right)"

Dream

1. "This Is Me" (remix)
2. "He Loves U Not"

Jessica Simpson

1. "Hot Like Fire"
2. "I Think I'm in Love with You"
3. "I Never"
4. "I Wanna Love You Forever"
5. "A Little Bit"
6. "Irresistible"

City High

1. "City High Anthem"
2. "What Would You Do?"
3. "Caramel"

Eve

1. "What Y'all Want"
2. "Love is Blind"
3. "Let Me Blow Ya Mind"
4. "Who's That Girl?"

Nelly and the St. Lunatics

1. "Video Introduction"
2. "Country Grammar (Hot Shit)"
3. "Batter Up"
4. "Midwest Swing"
5. "Ride wit Me"
6. "E.I."

Destiny's Child

1. "Independent Women Part I"
2. "No, No, No (Part 2)"
3. "Bug a Boo"
4. "Bills, Bills, Bills"
5. "Emotion"
6. "The Story of Beauty" (Rowland solo)
7. "O-o-h Child" (Williams solo)
8. "Dangerously in Love" (Knowles solo)
9. "Thank You, Lord" / "You've Been So Good" / "Jesus Loves Me" / "Total Praise"
10. "Bootylicious"
11. "Say My Name"
12. "Nasty Girl"
13. "Proud Mary"
14. "Jumpin', Jumpin'"
15. "Survivor"
16. "Happy Face"

== Tour dates ==
Date	City	Country	Venue
North America
July 18, 2001	Albany	United States	Pepsi Arena
July 19, 2001	Hartford	United States	ctnow.com Meadows Music Theatre
July 20, 2001	Virginia Beach	United States	GTE Virginia Beach Amphitheater
July 21, 2001	Raleigh	United States	Alltel Pavilion
July 22, 2001	Bristow	United States	Nissan Pavilion
July 24, 2001	Hershey	United States	Hersheypark Stadium
July 25, 2001	Buffalo	United States	HSBC Arena
July 28, 2001	Atlanta	United States	Philips Arena
July 29, 2001	Maryland Heights	United States	Riverport Amphitheatre
July 30, 2001	Minneapolis	United States	Target Center
August 1, 2001	Bonner Springs	United States	Sandstone Amphitheater
August 2, 2001	Oklahoma City	United States	MCC Arena
August 3, 2001	Selma	United States	Verizon Wireless Amphitheater
August 4, 2001	Houston	United States	Compaq Center
August 5, 2001	Dallas	United States	Smirnoff Music Centre
August 8, 2001	Holmdel Township	United States	PNC Bank Arts Center
August 9, 2001	Camden	United States	Tweeter Center at the Waterfront
August 10, 2001	Mansfield	United States	Tweeter Center for the Performing Arts
August 11, 2001	Wantagh	United States	Jones Beach Theater
August 13, 2001	Toronto	Canada	Air Canada Centre
August 14, 2001	Columbus	United States	Polaris Amphitheater
August 16, 2001	Cincinnati	United States	Riverbend Music Center
August 17, 2001	Charlotte	United States	Verizon Wireless Amphitheatre
August 18, 2001	Tampa	United States	Ice Palace
August 19, 2001	Sunrise	United States	National Car Rental Center
August 21, 2001	Nashville	United States	AmSouth Amphitheatre
August 22, 2001	Cleveland	United States	Gund Arena
August 23, 2001	Clarkston	United States	DTE Energy Music Theatre
August 24, 2001	Burgettstown	United States	Post-Gazette Pavilion
August 25, 2001	Noblesville	United States	Verizon Wireless Music Center
August 26, 2001	Tinley Park	United States	Tweeter Center
August 30, 2001	San Diego	United States	San Diego Sports Arena
August 31, 2001	Las Vegas	United States	Mandalay Bay Events Center
September 1, 2001	Concord	United States	Chronicle Pavilion
September 2, 2001	Irvine	United States	Verizon Wireless Amphitheatre
September 3, 2001	Phoenix	United States	Cricket Pavilion
September 8, 2001	Albuquerque	United States	ABQ Journal Pavilion
September 9, 2001	Denver	United States	Pepsi Center
September 10, 2001	Salt Lake City	United States	Utah State Fair
September 21, 2001	Honolulu	United States	Blaisdell Arena

Cancellations and rescheduled shows

July 25, 2001	Buffalo, New York	Buffalo Niagara Convention Center	Moved to the HSBC Arena
August 5, 2001	Dallas, Texas	Reunion Arena	Moved to the Smirnoff Music Centre
August 15, 2001	Nashville, Tennessee	AmSouth Amphitheatre	Rescheduled to August 21, 2001
August 19, 2001	Miami, Florida	American Airlines Arena	Moved to the National Car Rental Center in Sunrise, Florida
August 22, 2001	Noblesville, Indiana	Verizon Wireless Music Center	Rescheduled to August 25, 2001
August 25, 2001	Cleveland, Ohio	Gund Arena	Rescheduled to August 22, 2001
August 29, 2001	Lancaster, California	Lancaster Municipal Stadium	Cancelled
August 30, 2001	Chula Vista, California	Coors Amphitheatre	Moved to the San Diego Sports Arena in San Diego
September 12, 2001	Vancouver, British Columbia, Canada	General Motors Place	Cancelled following the September 11 attacks
September 13, 2001	Seattle	KeyArena	Cancelled following the September 11 attacks
September 14, 2001	Portland, Oregon	Rose Garden Arena	Cancelled following the September 11 attacks
September 15, 2001	Vancouver, British Columbia, Canada	General Motors Place	Rescheduled to September 12, 2001
September 15, 2001	Mountain View, California	Shoreline Amphitheatre	Cancelled following the September 11 attacks
September 17, 2001	Edmonton, Alberta, Canada	Skyreach Centre	Cancelled following the September 11 attacks
September 19, 2001	Anchorage, Alaska	Sullivan Arena	Cancelled following the September 11 attacks
September 23, 2001	Honolulu, Hawaii	Blaisdell Arena	Cancelled

=== Box office score data ===
Venue	City	Tickets sold / available	Gross revenue
Hersheypark Stadium	Hershey	15,000 / 29,100 (52%)	$588,913
Verizon Wireless Amphitheatre	Irvine	10,489 / 16,244 (65%)	$324,744
Pepsi Center	Denver	8,604 / 18,072 (48%)	$332,720
