= Totally Hits, Vol. 3 =

Compilation album by Various Artists
- Released: November 14, 2000
- Recorded: Various Times
- Genre: Pop
- Length: 68:10
- Label: Atlantic

Various Artists chronology
| Totally Hits, Vol. 2 (2000) | Totally Hits, Vol. 3 (2000) | Totally Dance (2001) |

Professional ratings
Review scores
| Source | Rating |
|---|---|
| Allmusic | 3/5 stars |

Totally Hits 3 was released on November 14, 2000. The album was the third volume in the Totally Hits series. It reached #25 on the US Billboard 200 album chart. The album contains four Billboard Hot 100 number-one hits: "Music", "Bent", "Everything You Want", and "What a Girl Wants".

== Track listing ==
1. Madonna – "Music" (Deep Dish Dot Com Radio Edit)
2. Pink – "Most Girls"
3. Matchbox Twenty – "Bent"
4. Vertical Horizon – "Everything You Want"
5. Third Eye Blind – "Deep Inside of You"
6. Barenaked Ladies – "Pinch Me"
7. Faith Hill – "The Way You Love Me (Radio Remix)"
8. Dido – "Here with Me"
9. Toni Braxton – "He Wasn't Man Enough"
10. Christina Aguilera – "What a Girl Wants"
11. Next – "Wifey"
12. Debelah Morgan – "Dance with Me"
13. Joy Enriquez – "Tell Me How You Feel"
14. Vitamin C – "Graduation"
15. The Corrs – "Breathless"
16. Whitney Houston – "Fine"
17. John Michael Montgomery – "The Little Girl"

== Charts ==
=== Weekly charts ===
| Chart (2000) | Peak position |
|---|---|
| US Billboard 200 | 25 |

=== Year-end charts ===
| Chart (2001) | Position |
|---|---|
| US Billboard 200 | 114 |

== Certifications ==
| Region | Certification | Certified units/sales |
|---|---|---|
| United States (RIAA) | Platinum | 1,000,000^{^} |
^{^} Shipments figures based on certification alone.
