= Only Hits (compilation album) =

Compilation album by Various Artists
- Released: November 7, 2006
- Genre: Pop
- Length: 47:04
- Label: Rhino; Atlantic; Warner Music Group

Totally Hits chronology
Totally Hits 2005 (2005)	Only Hits (2006)

Professional ratings
Review scores
Source	Rating
AllMusic	2.5/5 stars

Only Hits is a compilation album released on November 7, 2006 by the Warner Music Group as a successor to the Totally Hits series. With only 12 tracks on it instead of the 20 that albums in the Totally Hits series contained, the compilation reached No. 32 on the Billboard 200 and spent 9 weeks on the chart.

== Track listing ==
1. Sean Paul featuring Keyshia Cole - "(When You Gonna) Give It Up to Me" (Radio Version) 4:04
2. Gnarls Barkley - "Crazy" 3:02
3. Panic! at the Disco - "I Write Sins Not Tragedies" 3:07
4. Cassie - "Me & U" 3:12
5. E-40 featuring T-Pain and Kandi Girl - "U and Dat" 3:23
6. Yung Joc - "It's Goin' Down" (Amended Version) 4:01
7. Danity Kane - "Show Stopper" 3:49
8. T.I. - "What You Know" 4:34
9. Young Dro featuring T.I. - "Shoulder Lean" [Radio Version] 4:22
10. D4L - "Laffy Taffy" 3:44
11. Lupe Fiasco - "Kick, Push" 4:16
12. James Blunt - "You're Beautiful" 3:24
