= Totally Hits 2001 =

Compilation album by Various artists
- Released: September 25, 2001
- Recorded: Various
- Genre: Pop
- Label: Arista

Various artists chronology
Totally Dance (2001)	Totally Hits 2001 (2001)	Totally Hits 2002 (2002)

Professional ratings
Review scores
Source	Rating
AllMusic	4.5/5 stars

Totally Hits 2001 is an album in the Totally Hits series. The album debuted and peaked at number 3 on the US Billboard 200 albums chart, selling nearly 139,000 copies in its first week. The album contains two Billboard Hot 100 number-one hits: "U Remind Me" and "Fallin'".

== Track listing ==
1. Blu Cantrell - "Hit 'Em Up Style (Oops!)" (4:08)
2. 112 - "Peaches & Cream" (3:11)
3. Missy Elliott - "Get Ur Freak On" (3:56)
4. Alicia Keys featuring Busta Rhymes - "Fallin' (Remix)" (3:54)
5. P. Diddy, Black Rob & Mark Curry - "Bad Boy for Life" (4:09)
6. Dream featuring Kain - "This Is Me (Remix)" (4:08)
7. Usher - "U Remind Me" (4:07)
8. O-Town - "All or Nothing" (4:08)
9. Eve 6 - "Here's to the Night" (4:03)
10. Uncle Kracker - "Follow Me" (3:34)
11. LFO - "Every Other Time" (4:05)
12. Sugar Ray - "When It's Over" (3:35)
13. Willa Ford - "I Wanna Be Bad" (3:04)
14. Toya - "I Do!!" (3:30)
15. Outkast - "So Fresh, So Clean" (4:00)
16. Ludacris featuring Shawnna - "What's Your Fantasy" (4:31)
17. Craig David - "Fill Me In" (4:11)
18. Dido - "Thank You" (3:39)

== Charts ==
=== Weekly charts ===
Chart (2001)	Peak position
US Billboard 200	3

=== Year-end charts ===
Chart (2001)	Position
US Billboard 200	120
Worldwide Albums (IFPI)	49
Chart (2002)	Position
US Billboard 200	87

== Certifications ==
Region	Certification	Certified units/sales
United States (RIAA)	Platinum	1,000,000^{^}
^{^} Shipments figures based on certification alone.
