= Totally Country Vol. 4 =

Compilation album by Various Artists
- Released: February 8, 2005
- Genre: Country music
- Length: 1:07:47
- Label: Sony BMG

Totally Country chronology
Totally Country Vol. 3 (2003)	Totally Country Vol. 4 (2005)	Totally Country Vol. 5 (2006)

Professional ratings
Review scores
Source	Rating
Allmusic	link

Totally Country Vol. 4 is an album in the Totally Hits series.

== Track listing ==
1. "That'd Be Alright" – Alan Jackson (3:39)
2. "Redneck Woman" – Gretchen Wilson (3:42)
3. "No Shoes, No Shirt, No Problems" – Kenny Chesney (3:31)
4. "Some Beach" – Blake Shelton (3:26)
5. "Save a Horse (Ride a Cowboy)" – Big & Rich (3:21)
6. "I Love This Bar" – Toby Keith (5:35)
7. "Brokenheartsville" – Joe Nichols (3:52)
8. "Little Moments" – Brad Paisley (3:41)
9. "Letters From Home" – John Michael Montgomery (4:28)
10. "Tough Little Boys" – Gary Allan (3:57)
11. "Desperately" – George Strait (4:07)
12. "Let's Be Us Again" – Lonestar (3:54)
13. "Perfect" – Sara Evans (4:03)
14. "Heaven" – Los Lonely Boys (3:49)
15. "I Can't Sleep" – Clay Walker (4:03)
16. "Help Pour Out the Rain (Lacey's Song)" – Buddy Jewell (3:49)
17. "Hell Yeah" – Montgomery Gentry (4:50)

== Chart performance ==
=== Weekly charts ===
Chart (2005)	Peak position
US Billboard 200	5
US Top Country Albums (Billboard)	1

=== Year-end charts ===
Chart (2005)	Position
US Billboard 200	101
US Top Country Albums (Billboard)	15

== Certifications ==
Region	Certification	Certified units/sales
United States (RIAA)	Platinum	1,000,000^{^}
^{^} Shipments figures based on certification alone.
