= Totally Hits (album) =

Compilation album by Various artists
- Released: November 9, 1999
- Recorded: Various times
- Genre: Pop
- Length: 73:30
- Label: Arista

Totally Hits chronology
Totally Hits (1999)	Totally Hits, Vol. 2 (2000)

Professional ratings
Review scores
Source	Rating
AllMusic	3/5 stars

Totally Hits was released on November 9, 1999. The album was the first volume in the Totally Hits series. It peaked at #14 on the US Billboard 200 album chart. The album contains five Billboard Hot 100 number-one hits: "No Scrubs", "Angel of Mine", "Smooth", "Believe", and "One Week".

== Track listing ==
1. TLC – "No Scrubs" 3:39
2. Monica – "Angel of Mine" 4:11
3. Sugar Ray – "Someday" 4:05
4. Santana featuring Rob Thomas – "Smooth" 4:03
5. NSYNC – "(God Must Have Spent) A Little More Time on You" 4:40
6. Cher – "Believe" 3:59
7. Deborah Cox – "Nobody's Supposed to Be Here" (Dance Mix) 4:15
8. Madonna – "Ray of Light" 4:36
9. Barenaked Ladies – "One Week" 2:52
10. Third Eye Blind – "Jumper" 4:33
11. Whitney Houston featuring Faith Evans and Kelly Price – "Heartbreak Hotel" 4:41
12. LFO – "Summer Girls" 4:18
13. Five – "When the Lights Go Out" 4:07
14. Brandy – "Almost Doesn't Count" 3:38
15. Usher – "You Make Me Wanna..." 3:41
16. Faith Hill – "This Kiss" 3:16
17. Sarah McLachlan – "Angel" 4:30
18. Kid Rock – "Bawitdaba" 4:26

== Charts ==
=== Weekly charts ===
Chart (1999)	Peak position
US Billboard 200	14

=== Year-end charts ===
Chart (2000)	Position
US Billboard 200	46

== Certifications ==
Region	Certification	Certified units/sales
United States (RIAA)	Platinum	1,000,000^{^}
^{^} Shipments figures based on certification alone.
