= Totally Country Vol. 2 =

Compilation album by Various Artists
- Released: October 29, 2002
- Genre: Country music
- Length: 1:07:07
- Label: Sony Records

Totally Country chronology
Totally Country (2002)	Totally Country Vol. 2 (2002)	Totally Country Vol. 3 (2003)

Professional ratings
Review scores
Source	Rating
Allmusic	link

Totally Country Vol. 2 is an album in the Totally Hits series, which features 17 country singles from 2000 to 2002.

== Track listing ==
1. "Modern Day Bonnie and Clyde" – Travis Tritt (4:44)
2. "I Breathe In, I Breathe Out" – Chris Cagle (4:03)
3. "Just What I Do" – Trick Pony (3:21)
4. "My Town" – Montgomery Gentry (4:26)
5. "That's When I Love You" – Phil Vassar (3:29)
6. "The Best Day" – George Strait (3:24)
7. "But for the Grace of God" – Keith Urban (4:32)
8. "Ten Rounds with Jose Cuervo" – Tracy Byrd (3:02)
9. "Ol' Red" – Blake Shelton (3:42)
10. "Life Happened" – Tammy Cochran (4:27)
11. "The One" – Gary Allan (4:19)
12. "She Was" – Mark Chesnutt (3:21)
13. "Wrapped Around" – Brad Paisley (3:22)
14. "The Impossible" – Joe Nichols (4:06)
15. "I Don't Want You to Go" – Carolyn Dawn Johnson (4:33)
16. "I'm Movin' On" – Rascal Flatts (4:04)
17. "Ashes by Now" – Lee Ann Womack (4:12)

== Charts ==
=== Weekly charts ===
Chart (2002)	Peak position
US Billboard 200	23
US Top Country Albums (Billboard)	5

=== Year-end charts ===
Chart (2002)	Position
US Top Country Albums (Billboard)	62
Chart (2003)	Position
US Top Country Albums (Billboard)	24

== Certifications ==
Region	Certification	Certified units/sales
United States (RIAA)	Gold	500,000^{^}
^{^} Shipments figures based on certification alone.
