= Totally Country =

Compilation album by Various Artists
- Released: February 5, 2002
- Genre: Country
- Length: 66:02
- Label: BNA

Totally Country chronology
Totally Country (2002)	Totally Country Vol. 2 (2002)

Professional ratings
Review scores
Source	Rating
AllMusic	link

Totally Country is the first country music album in the Totally Hits series. Released in 2002 via BNA Records, it includes seventeen country hit singles from 2000 to 2002. With the exception of Dwight Yoakam's cover of Cheap Trick's "I Want You to Want Me" and Billy Gilman's "One Voice", all of the songs on this compilation were Top Ten hits.

== Track listing ==
1. "Only in America" – Brooks & Dunn (4:29)
2. "She Couldn't Change Me" – Montgomery Gentry (4:21)
3. "With Me" – Lonestar (3:53)
4. "Without You" – Dixie Chicks (3:31)
5. "On a Night like This" – Trick Pony (3:31)
6. "I Lost It" – Kenny Chesney (3:54)
7. "Angels in Waiting" – Tammy Cochran (3:37)
8. "Born to Fly" – Sara Evans (5:35)
9. "Austin" – Blake Shelton (3:49)
10. "One Voice" – Billy Gilman (4:10)
11. "Where the Blacktop Ends" – Keith Urban (2:59)
12. "One More Day" – Diamond Rio (3:37)
13. "It's a Great Day to Be Alive" – Travis Tritt (4:02)
14. "I Want You to Want Me" – Dwight Yoakam (3:28)
15. "The Little Girl" – John Michael Montgomery (3:53)
16. "Buy Me a Rose" – Kenny Rogers, Alison Krauss, Billy Dean (3:48)
17. "There You Are" – Martina McBride (3:25)

== Charts ==
=== Weekly charts ===
Chart (2002)	Peak position
US Billboard 200	12
US Top Country Albums (Billboard)	2

=== Year-end charts ===
Chart (2002)	Position
US Billboard 200	163
US Top Country Albums (Billboard)	16

Chart (2003)	Position
US Top Country Albums (Billboard)	72

== Certifications ==
Region	Certification	Certified units/sales
United States (RIAA)	Platinum	1,000,000^{^}
^{^} Shipments figures based on certification alone.
