= Totally R&B =

Compilation album by Various artists
- Released: July 1, 2003
- Genre: R&B
- Label: BMG/Warner Music Group

Totally Hits chronology
Totally Hits 2002: More Platinum Hits (2002)	Totally R&B (2003)	Totally Hip Hop (2003)

Professional ratings
Review scores
Source	Rating
AllMusic	4/5 stars

Totally R&B is an album in the Totally Hits music compilation series. Released in 2003, the compilation focuses on mostly R&B singles that were released in the early 2000s. Unlike its Totally Hits counterparts which mainly focus on Top 40/pop hits, Totally R&B and Totally Hip Hop are the only two compilations focused on urban music acts.

Totally R&B contains the Billboard Hot 100 number-one single, "U Got It Bad", which is also the only number-one R&B hit on the compilation.

== Track listing ==
1. Tyrese – "How You Gonna Act Like That" 3:54
2. Usher – "U Got It Bad" 4:08
3. R. Kelly – "Ignition" 3:42
4. Brandy – "Full Moon" 3:59
5. Alicia Keys – "A Woman's Worth" 4:20
6. Jaheim – "Put That Woman First" 4:04
7. Nivea – "Laundromat" 3:34
8. Erick Sermon – "Music" 3:43
9. Monica – "All Eyez On Me" 3:58
10. Luther Vandross – "I'd Rather" 4:51
11. Donell Jones – "You Know That I Love You" 4:19
12. Joe – "What If a Woman" 4:15
13. Syleena Johnson – "Guess What" 3:31
14. Angie Stone – "Brotha" 3:59
15. Kenny Lattimore and Chante Moore – "Things That Lovers Do" 3:52
16. Jimmy Cozier – "She's All I Got" 3:32
17. Whitney Houston – "One of Those Days" 3:53
18. Craig David – "Hidden Agenda (Soulshock & Karlin Remix)" 3:46
19. Toni Braxton – "A Better Man" 3:58
20. Gerald Levert – "Closure" 4:09
