= Sacario =

American rapper and songwriter

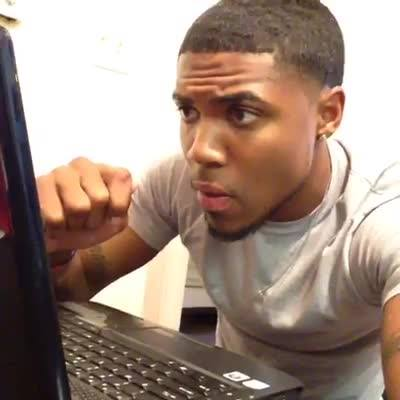
- Sacario in 2008

Background information
- Genre: Hip hop
- Occupations: Rapper, Songwriter, Executive producer, Filmmaker
- Years active: 2001 – present
- Label: Elektra

Jamar Austin, also known as Sacario, is an American rapper and songwriter best known for writing the song "If I Could Go" for Angie Martinez. Billboard named the song among the biggest songs of the year in 2002. It was featured on Totally Hits 2002: More Platinum Hits, which is Certified Platinum by the RIAA with sales of over 1,000,000 copies.

His first two releases, "Live Big (Car Keys)" (2002) and "If I Could Go", were both included on The Transporter movie soundtrack. In the first deal of its kind EA Trax packaged "If I Could Go" with the NBA Live 2003 video game Soundtrack. The soundtrack sold 1.3 million copies worldwide and was inducted into the Guinness World Records as the "first officially released video game soundtrack to be RIAA certified platinum". According to Guinness World Records, NBA Live 2003 soundtrack went platinum in six months. In 2004 MTV announced his nomination in the Mixtape Artist of the Year category at The Annual Mixtape Awards.

== Animal House and Elektra Records ==
On September 28, 2001 Sacario signed a production deal with Angie Martinez's Animal House Productions. In addition, three months later he signed a record deal with Elektra Records. The two joint venture labels first Sacario release was a "Live Big (Car Keys)" remix. The remix included Angie Martinez and rapper Fat Joe, and was featured on The Transporter movie soundtrack. Sacario started a successful career as a ghostwriter, while he was signed as an artist. He wrote all of Angie Martinez's Animal House album.

Animal House debuted with the Rick Rock produced single "If I Could Go" featuring Sacario and singer Lil Mo. It remained on numerous Billboard charts including The Billboard Hot 100, Hot R&B/Hip-Hop Songs and Top 40 Mainstream Charts for 36 consecutive weeks. The song won two Nielsen BDS Spin Awards for 50,000 radio spins and 100,000 radio spins.

A cover of "If I Could Go" was recorded by the Kidz Bop Kids and was released on Kidz Bop 3 children's album. The album debuted #1 on Billboard Kid Albums chart, #17 on Billboard 200 Album chart, "marking the highest chart debut ever for a non soundtrack children's album in the history of Billboard 200". The album is Certified Gold by the RIAA selling over 500,000 copies.

On August 20, 2002 Animal House debuted at #11 on Billboard 200 Album charts, and #6 on Billboard R&B/Hip-Hop Albums charts, selling 92,000 copies its first week. Rolling Stone gave the album a favorable 3 out of 5 star review. Sacario is also listed as one of the album's executive producers.

Elektra Entertainment President Sylvia Rhone was offered an EVP position at Universal Records. and Elektra closed its Urban Department in 2004.

== Additional credits ==
Sacario wrote the songs "Break Yourself" "Harder" on the Man vs. Machine album by West Coast rapper Xzibit. Man vs. Machine has been certified a gold record by the RIAA for selling over 500,000 copies in the U.S., certified Canadian gold by the CRIA for selling over 50,000 copies and certified gold by the Australian Recording Industry Association for selling 35,000 copies.

== Televised performances ==
Sacario performed on Good Day Live. BET's 106 & Park. He performed a freestyle in the "Booth" on Rap City followed by a brief interview by Big Tigger. He appeared on Last Call with Carson Daly, and was a special guest on Canada's Much Music Show alongside Angie Martinez. He performed with singer Lil Mo and Angie Martinez on Showtime at the Apollo. He also performed on Soul Train alongside Tank.

== Media ==
Sacario is featured in issue 36 of XXL. His Sacario the Boss mixtapes are heavily bootlegged on many hip-hop websites throughout Asia. He was featured on the Jade Jagger disc of Renaissance Presents Pacha Ibiza album. Canadian recording artist Promise asked Sacario to feature alongside rapper Drake on the record titled You Got Me. Sacario has a two-page spread interview in Bloque Urbano, a magazine based in Dominican Republic. He recorded the theme song for the NBA Washington Wizards girls 2012/13 season.

== Discography ==
=== Collaborative singles ===
Year	Title	Chart positions			Album
Year	Title	US	US R&B	Pop Songs	Album
2002	"Live Big Remix" (featuring Fat Joe and Angie Martinez)	--	--	--	
2002	"If I Could Go" with Angie Martinez (featuring Sacario)	15	26	11	Animal House

=== Official mixtapes ===
- Invincible (2001)
- Best of Sacario Hosted by Angie Martinez (2002)
- Sacario The Boss Part 1 (2003)
- Sacario The Boss Part 2 (2004)
- Sacario The Boss Part 3 (2004)
- Sacario The Boss Part 4 (2005)
- Sacario The Boss Part 5 (2006)
- My Movie (2008)
- Sneak Attack (2010)

=== Studio albums (collaborative) ===
Year	Album	Peak chart positions			Certifications (sales thresholds)
Year	Album	U.S.	U.S. R&B	U.S. Rap	Certifications (sales thresholds)
2002	Animal House (album): By Angie Martinez; Released: August 20, 2002; Label: Animal House/ Elektra Entertainment	11	6	--	

Year	Album	Peak chart positions			Certifications (sales thresholds)
Year	Album	U.S.	U.S. R&B	U.S. Rap	Certifications (sales thresholds)
2002	Man vs. Machine: By Xzibit; Released: October 1, 2002; Label: Columbia Records	3	1	--	Gold

=== Compilation albums ===
Year	Album	Chart positions			Certifications (sales thresholds)
Year	Album	US	US R&B	Kid Albums	Certifications (sales thresholds)
2002	Totally Hits 2002: More Platinum Hits	21	--	--	Platinum
2003	Kidz Bop 3	17	--	1	Gold

=== Soundtracks ===
Year	Album	Chart positions			Certifications (sales thresholds)
Year	Album	US	US R&B	Kid Albums	Certifications (sales thresholds)
2003	NBA Live 2003	--	--	--	Platinum
2003	The Transporter	--	--	--	--

== See also ==
- Billboard Year-End Hot 100 singles of 2002
