= Dream (American group) =

American girl group

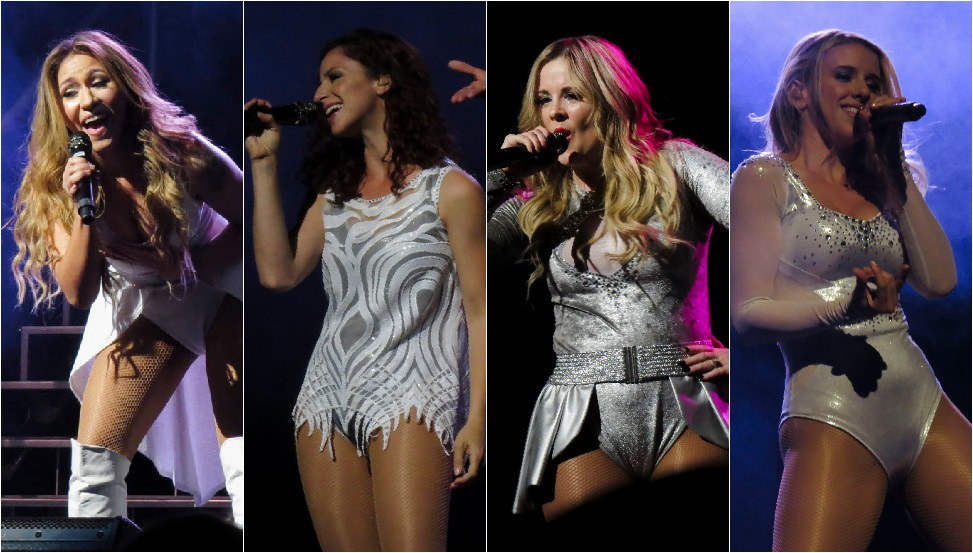
- Dream in 2016

Background information
- Origin: Los Angeles, California, U.S.
- Genres: Pop; R&B
- Years active: 1998–2003; 2015–2016
- Labels: Bad Boy; Clockwork
- Past members: Alex Chester; Holly Blake-Arnstein; Diana Ortiz; Ashley Poole; Melissa Schuman; Kasey Sheridan

Dream was an American girl group formed in 1998, primarily consisting of Holly Blake-Arnstein, Diana Ortiz, Ashley Poole, and Melissa Schuman. The group was signed to rapper Puff Daddy's Bad Boy Records label and released their debut studio album It Was All a Dream in 2001, which peaked at number six on the Billboard 200. The album was preceded by the single "He Loves U Not" which peaked at number two on the Billboard Hot 100, and was followed by the moderate chart hit "This Is Me".

Amid conflicts with their label, their second studio album Reality (2003) did not see a widespread release following the release of its first single, "Crazy", and the group disbanded. Dream briefly reunited in 2015 and independently released the single "I Believe" the following year before disbanding once more.

== History ==
=== 1998–2000: Formation ===
The group was originally formed in October 1998. Talent scout Debbie Fontaine selected Holly Blake-Arnstein (13), Melissa Schuman (14), Ashley Poole (13), and Alex Chester (13), four teens from California, to comprise a girl group called First Warning, which was later changed to Dream.

The group auditioned for Sean Combs and were subsequently signed to Bad Boy Records. Following this, the group stopped working with Fontaine, who later sued Combs and Blake-Arnstein, Schuman, and Poole, but lost her court case. In January 1999, Chester was replaced by Diana Ortiz (13).

=== 2000–2001: It Was All a Dream ===
Dream released their debut single "He Loves U Not" in 2000. "He Loves U Not" peaked at number 2 on the Billboard Hot 100, and number 17 on the UK Singles Chart. The video for the single peaked at number 2 on MTV's TRL. Their debut album It Was All a Dream was released on January 23, 2001. The second single from the album, "This Is Me", was not as successful, but the music video hit number 1 on TRL. An alternate song with the same name but different lyrics and production, titled "This Is Me (Remix)" was also released featuring rapper Kain and Sean Combs, and was later included on the compilation Totally Hits 2001. Bad Boy Records had planned to release more singles from It Was All a Dream, but these releases were later canceled. According to Blake-Arnstein, this was partly due to the impact of the September 11 terrorist attacks in 2001.

To promote It Was All a Dream, Dream participated in the 2001 TRL tour, and opened for Destiny's Child, Eve, NSYNC (No Strings Attached Tour) and Nelly. They were featured in a segment of MTV Cribs. Play Along Toys released dolls of the group in 2001. Dream made various appearances on television shows, including TRL, The Rosie O'Donnell Show, The Early Show, Live with Regis and Kelly, and Good Morning America.

=== 2002–2003: Lineup change and disbandment ===
In April 2002, Melissa Schuman left the group to pursue an acting career. A lengthy search conducted by Sean Combs and the three remaining members led to Kasey Sheridan (15) joining the group in Fall 2002.

Dream spent the subsequent months recording new songs for their second album. In the summer of 2003, the group released the single "Crazy" featuring rapper Loon which coincided with a sexier image. Blake-Arnstein later noted that the sexier, more mature image pushed upon the group by Combs and their management was not a welcome change, and that she and the other members were no longer enjoying the experience. "Crazy" peaked at #39 on the Billboard Mainstream Top 40. Dream's album Reality was completed and was scheduled to be released in Fall 2003, but its release was repeatedly postponed by their label. The album did not see a wide release and was only released for digital download from the French Virgin Megastore website. Bad Boy Records later dropped Dream and they disbanded, though their dissolution was never formally announced.

=== 2003–2012: Post-breakup activities ===
Ashley Poole and Melissa Schuman pursued solo singing careers, and Holly Blake-Arnstein joined the California-based band Whirl Magnet.

Meanwhile, members Melissa Schuman, Ashley Poole, and Diana Ortiz started a new group under the name Lady Phoenix. A reality show documenting their search for new members was in the works, but was not picked up by any networks, and the group disbanded in 2012.

=== 2015–2016: Comeback and "I Believe" ===
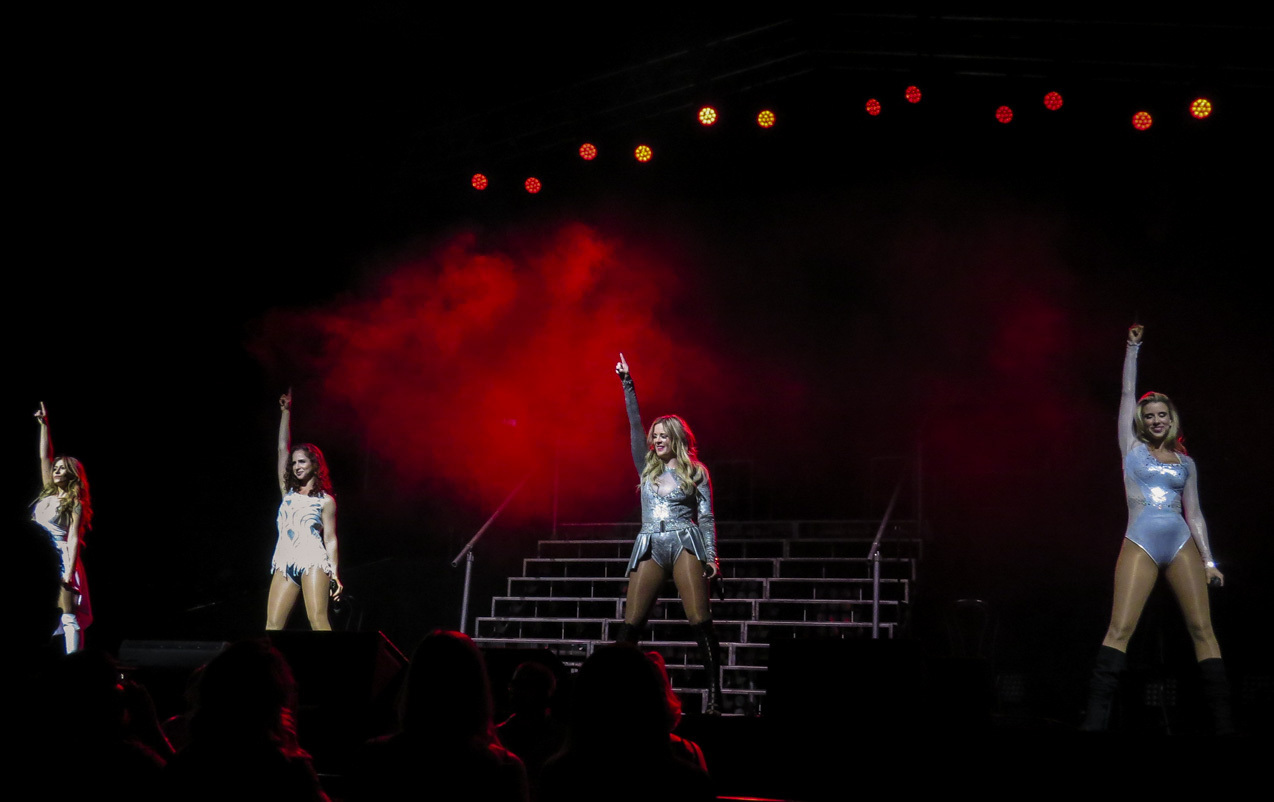
Dream performing in 2016

On May 11, 2015, the original members of Dream posted a video online performing a cappella version of their 2000 single "He Loves U Not". On May 29, 2015, Dream announced they would be making a comeback and launched a new Twitter and Facebook page. On December 17, 2015, Dream released a studio recording of "O Holy Night".

On August 2, 2016, Dream released their first single together in 13 years, titled "I Believe".

In 2016, Dream opened for 98 Degrees on the My2K Tour. They also performed at the 2016 Mixtape Festival on August 6 with New Kids On The Block headlining. On August 25, 2016, former member Kasey Sheridan joined Dream on stage to perform "Crazy" at the Microsoft Theater in Los Angeles, California.

On October 5, 2016, Ashley Poole announced that Dream had once again disbanded.

== Discography ==
=== Studio albums ===
List of studio albums, with selected chart positions, and certifications
Title	Album details	Peak position	Certifications
Title	Album details	US	Certifications
It Was All a Dream	Released: January 23, 2001; Label: Bad Boy; Formats: Cassette, CD, digital download	6	RIAA: Platinum
Reality	Released: 2003; Label: Bad Boy; Formats: Digital download	—	—

=== Compilation albums ===
Title	Album details
Dream Never Land	Released: May 9, 2008; Label: Clockwork Entertainment; Formats: Digital download
Daddy's Little Girl	Released: May 9, 2008; Label: Clockwork Entertainment; Formats: Digital download
Dream Back to You	Released: 2009; Label: Clockwork Entertainment; Formats: Digital download

=== Singles ===
Year	Single	Peak chart positions										Certifications (sales thresholds)	Album
Year	Single	US	US Pop	AUS	CAN	GER	IRE	NED	NZ	SWE	UK	Certifications (sales thresholds)	Album
2000	"He Loves U Not"	2	3	30	12	91	40	40	6	26	17	RIAA: Gold	It Was All a Dream
2001	"This Is Me"	39	13	—	—	—	—	—	47	—	—	—	It Was All a Dream
2001	"This Is Me (Remix)" (featuring Kain)	—	—	—	—	—	—	—	—	—	—	—	Non-album single
2003	"Crazy"	—	39	—	—	—	—	—	—	—	—	—	Reality
2016	"I Believe"	—	—	—	—	—	—	—	—	—	—	—	Non-album single
"—" denotes releases that failed to chart or not released in that country.

==== Promotional singles ====
Year	Single	Album
2001	"In My Dreams"	It Was All a Dream
2001	"I Don't Like Anyone"	It Was All a Dream
2003	"That's OK" (featuring Fabolous)	Reality

== Awards and nominations ==
Year	Award	Category	Work	Result	Ref.
2001	Billboard Music Awards	Top New Artist	Themselves	Nominated	
2001	Teen Choice Awards	Choice Music: Breakout Artist	Themselves	Nominated	
2001	Teen Choice Awards	Choice Music: Pop Group	Themselves	Nominated	
2001	Soul Train Lady of Soul Awards	Best R&B/Soul Album of the Year, Group, Band or Duo	It Was All a Dream	Nominated	
2001	Soul Train Lady of Soul Awards	Best R&B/Soul or Rap New Artist, Group, Band or Duo	"He Loves U Not"	Nominated	
2002	ASCAP Pop Music Awards	Most Performed Song	"He Loves U Not"	Won	
2002	BMI Pop Awards	Award-Winning Song	"He Loves U Not"	Won	
