= He Loves U Not =

2000 single by Dream

Single by Dream

from the album It Was All a Dream
- Released: August 22, 2000
- Studio: Canyon Reverb, The Sweatbox, Sony (California, US)
- Genre: Dance-pop; R&B
- Length: 3:46
- Label: Bad Boy Entertainment
- Songwriters: Steve Kipner; David Frank; Pamela Sheyne
- Producers: David Frank; Steve Kipner

Dream singles chronology
"He Loves U Not" (2000)	"This Is Me" (2001)

Music video
- "He Loves U Not" on YouTube

"He Loves U Not" is a song by American girl group Dream. It was released on August 22, 2000, as the group's debut single and is featured on their debut album, It Was All a Dream (2001). The song was written in 1999 by Steve Kipner, David Frank and Pamela Sheyne, with the former two doing the production. A dance-pop and R&B song, "He Loves U Not" is about a girl confronting another girl trying to steal her boyfriend. An early version of the song started with a young girl's voice saying "He loves me, he loves you not," but was removed from both album and single versions, with the phrase "He loves you not" being heard at the end of the album version.

"He Loves U Not" received mixed reviews from critics who gave credit to the production and lyrics but felt that it was derivative compared to other songs of its time. The song peaked at number two on the Billboard Hot 100 chart for two weeks. It also peaked at numbers three, nine, and 15 on the Mainstream Top 40, Rhythmic Top 40, and Hot R&B/Hip-Hop Singles & Tracks charts, respectively. Worldwide, it reached the top 40 in several countries, including Canada, New Zealand, Norway, and the United Kingdom. The song was certified gold by the Recording Industry Association of America (RIAA) for selling over 500,000 copies in the United States.

An accompanying music video for the song, directed by Marcus Raboy, premiered on MTV's Total Request Live and features the girls dancing in three different settings: a white room with the Dream logo behind them, a California desert and a rotating white room. They first performed the song live by touring with fellow pop group *NSYNC on their No Strings Attached Tour. They made their television debut performing the song live on TRL and would make later appearances at Live with Regis, The Tonight Show with Jay Leno, The Rosie O'Donnell Show, the 2001 Walt Disney World Summer Jam Concert, The Early Show and the 7th Annual Soul Train Lady of Soul Awards.

== Content ==
Upon Dream's signing to Puff Daddy's Bad Boy Entertainment, the quartet recorded "He Loves U Not" as their breakthrough single, setting aside previously recorded songs "Do U Wanna Dance," "Baby," and "Miss You" that they had done while signed to Clockwork Entertainment with Judith Fontaine as their manager.

Lead vocals are performed by Holly Arnstein with speaking breaks by Melissa Schuman. Diana Ortiz can be heard saying a few Spanish phrases, such as Él me quiere ("He loves me") and No te quiere ("He doesn't love you"). An early version of the song opened with a young girl's voice saying "He loves me, he loves you not," though this opening was removed on the album and single versions, although the phrase "he loves you not" is heard at the end of the album version.

The song is sung from the point of view of a girl confronting another girl who is trying to steal her boyfriend, to whom she claims, "He loves me, he loves you not."

== Critical reception ==
"He Loves U Not" received a mixed reception from music critics who praised the production and lyrics but felt that it was derivative compared to other songs of its ilk. Billboard praised the song for having a street edge in its production, the group's performance and compared the lyrics positively to Brandy and Monica's duet "The Boy Is Mine", concluding that "With Bad Boy's genius and solid talent here, "He Loves U Not" has a good shot at becoming a dream come true." AllMusic's Stephen Thomas Erlewine highlighted the song as a "Track Pick", giving credit to P. Diddy's team of producers and songwriters. Arion Berger of Rolling Stone praised the song for exuding bright attitude, saying that it has a "whipping elasticity and sass to spare." David Browne of Entertainment Weekly called the song "an utterly derivative piece of song-and-dance pop-R&B," but did highlight the rhythm and guitar sounds as "intriguing" and the lyrical catfight for having "enough hiss in it to be interesting." A writer for People, reviewing the album, was less positive towards the song's adult content and preferred the tracks "Mr. Telephone Man" and "How Long" for how "the girls sound their age."

The song gave them a Soul Train Lady of Soul Award nomination for Best R&B/Soul or Rap New Artist, Group, Band or Duo but lost to 3LW's "No More (Baby I'ma Do Right)". In 2017, Billboard placed "He Loves U Not" at number 36 on their list of the 100 Greatest Girl Group Songs of All Time.

== Commercial performance ==
"He Loves U Not" debuted at number 99 on the US Billboard Hot 100 for the week of September 30, 2000. Six weeks later, it entered the top 40 at number 32 for the week of November 11. It entered the top 10 at number eight for the week of December 16. The song eventually peaked at number two for two weeks in December 2000 and January 2001. It also reached number 15 on the Hot R&B/Hip-Hop Singles & Tracks chart the week of January 6, 2001. It was certified gold by the RIAA on January 2, selling over 500,000 copies in the United States.

In Australia, where the song was released on February 26, 2001, "He Loves U Not" entered the ARIA Singles Chart on March 11, and stayed there for three weeks, peaking at number 30. The song was also released in the United Kingdom, peaking at number 17 on the UK Singles Chart on March 17, and staying on the chart for seven weeks.

== Music video ==
The music video for "He Loves U Not" was shot June 28–30, 2000, and directed by Marcus Raboy. It featured three settings: in the first, the girls, clad in pink outfits, danced in a white room with the Dream logo flashing behind them; in the second, the girls danced on stage in a California desert; in the third, the girls moved around a rotating white room; the same one used previously in the videos for *NSYNC's "Bye Bye Bye" and Sugar Ray's "Fly". The video inspired the title sequence from the Peacock musical comedy series Girls5eva, according to Slate's Heather Schwedel.

== Live performances ==
Dream first performed the song live on November 26, 2000, by touring with fellow pop group *NSYNC on the second leg of their No Strings Attached Tour in the Staples Center in Los Angeles. The song was also performed when they opened alongside Baha Men and Debelah Morgan for 98 Degrees on their Revelation Tour (2001) and on MTV's Total Request Live Tour (2001).

They made their television debut performing it live on TRL on December 11, 2000, to promote the premiere of the song's music video. On January 24, 2001, they performed it on two talk shows to promote the release of their debut album a day before: Live with Regis in Las Vegas and The Tonight Show with Jay Leno. On February 12, it was performed on The Rosie O'Donnell Show. On June 10, they performed this and "This Is Me" at the 2001 Walt Disney World Summer Jam Concert, aboard the Disney Wonder cruise ship in the Bahamas. A week later, they performed it at Wango Tango, an annual all-day concert organized by KIIS-FM, in California. Troy J. Augusto of Variety put their performance alongside Eden's Crush and Vertical Horizon's, saying that they were "easy to forget." Eight days later, they appeared on The Early Show on June 25, 2001, to perform this and "This Is Me". On August 28, 2001, they performed both album and remix versions of the song at the 7th Annual Soul Train Lady of Soul Awards.

== Track listings ==
US CD single

1. "He Loves U Not" – 3:46
2. "He Loves U Not" (instrumental) – 3:46

US 12-inch single

A1. "He Loves U Not" (HQ^{2} club mix) – 8:24
A2. "He Loves U Not" (HQ^{2} instrumental) – 8:24
B1. "He Loves U Not" (HQ^{2} radio mix) – 3:48
B2. "He Loves U Not" (Meeker & MC Supplier 2 step garage mix) – 6:24

Australian CD single

1. "He Loves U Not" (radio mix) – 3:48
2. "He Loves U Not" (remix featuring G. Dep) – 3:50
3. "He Loves U Not" (Ingroove club mix) – 6:36
4. "He Loves U Not" (HQ^{2} club mix) – 8:25
5. "He Loves U Not" (Meeker & MC Supplier 2 step garage mix) – 6:27

UK CD single

1. "He Loves U Not" (radio version) – 3:47
2. "He Loves U Not" (remix featuring G. Dep) – 3:49
3. "He Loves U Not" (radio edit video)

UK 12-inch single

A1. "He Loves U Not" (radio version) – 3:47
A2. "He Loves U Not" (remix featuring G. Dep) – 3:49
B1. "He Loves U Not" (remix instrumental) – 3:08

UK cassette single

1. "He Loves U Not" (radio version) – 3:47
2. "He Loves U Not" (remix) – 3:49

European CD single

1. "He Loves U Not" (radio mix) – 3:48
2. "He Loves U Not" (HQ^{2} remix) – 8:52

== Credits and personnel ==
Credits are adapted from the liner notes of It Was All a Dream.

Recording

- Recorded and mixed at Canyon Reverb, The Sweatbox, and Sony Studios (California, US)

Personnel

- Dave Way – mixer (Pacifique Recording Studios; North Hollywood, Los Angeles)
- Wassim Zreik – assistant engineer
- David Frank – keyboards, drums, songwriting
- Steve Kipner – additional keyboards, songwriting
- Pamela Sheyne – songwriting, additional background vocals

== Charts ==
=== Weekly charts ===
Chart (2000–2001)	Peak position
Australia (ARIA)	30
Australian Urban (ARIA)	12
Canada Airplay (Nielsen BDS)	5
Canada (Nielsen SoundScan)	12
Europe (Eurochart Hot 100)	56
Germany (GfK)	91
Ireland (IRMA)	40
Netherlands (Dutch Top 40 Tipparade)	2
Netherlands (Single Top 100)	40
New Zealand (Recorded Music NZ)	6
Norway (VG-lista)	20
Scottish Singles Sales (Official Charts)	22
Sweden (Sverigetopplistan)	26
UK Singles (Official Charts)	17
UK Dance (Official Charts)	29
UK Hip Hop/R&B (Official Charts)	6
US Billboard Hot 100	2
US Dance Singles Sales (Billboard) Remixes	15
US Hot R&B/Hip-Hop Songs (Billboard)	15
US Pop Airplay (Billboard)	3
US Rhythmic Airplay (Billboard)	9

=== Year-end charts ===
Chart (2001)	Position
Brazil (Crowley)	91
Canada (Nielsen SoundScan)	77
New Zealand (RIANZ)	41
US Billboard Hot 100	28
US Mainstream Top 40 (Billboard)	25
US Rhythmic Top 40 (Billboard)	43

== Certifications ==
Region	Certification	Certified units/sales
United States (RIAA)	Gold	500,000^{^}
^{^} Shipments figures based on certification alone.

== Release history ==
Region	Date	Format(s)	Label(s)	Ref.
United States	August 22, 2000	Rhythmic contemporary; contemporary hit radio	Bad Boy	
United States	November 28, 2000	Urban radio	Bad Boy	
Australia	February 26, 2001	CD	Bad Boy; Arista; BMG	
Sweden	February 26, 2001	CD	Bad Boy; Arista; BMG	
United Kingdom	March 5, 2001	12-inch vinyl; CD; cassette	Bad Boy; Arista; BMG	
