= Angie Martinez =

American radio host and rapper (born 1971)

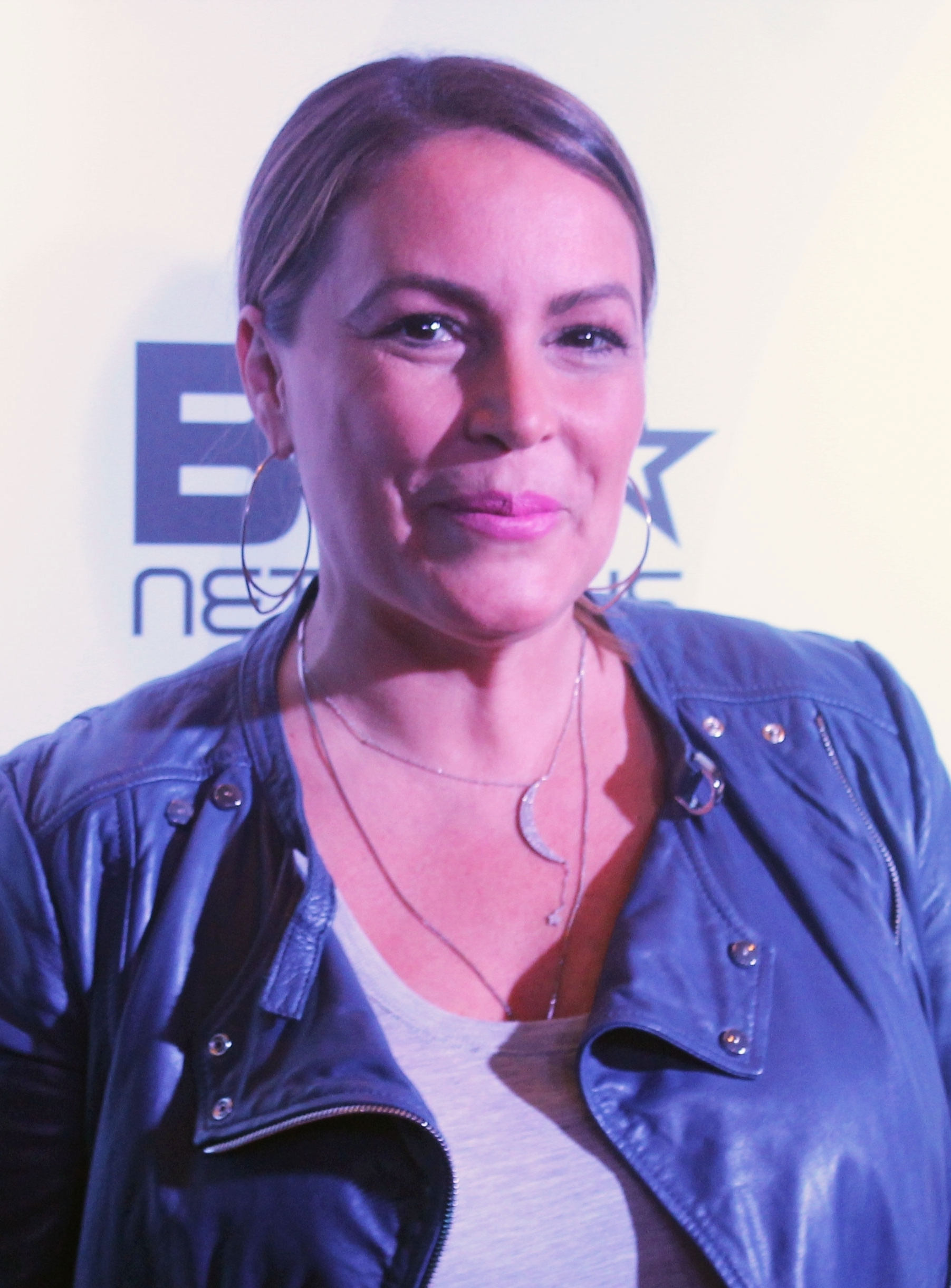
- Martinez at the 2015 Urbanworld Film Festival

Background information
- Also known as: "The Voice of New York"
- Born: Angela Martinez; January 9, 1971 (age 55); Brooklyn, New York City, U.S.
- Genres: Hip hop; Latin hip hop
- Occupations: Radio personality; podcaster; rapper; singer; actress
- Years active: 1992–present
- Labels: Elektra; Roc Nation
- Awards: Radio Hall of Fame (2020); NAB Marconi Radio Award (2018); Rutgers University Honorary Degree (2020)
- Presenting career
- Station: Power 105.1
- Time slot: Weekdays, 2–6pm Eastern
- Country: United States

Angela "Angie" Martinez (born January 9, 1971) is an American radio personality, podcaster, singer, rapper and actress. Dubbed "The Voice of New York", Martinez is widely known for her 28-year run at New York City station Hot 97 (WQHT). She left the station in 2014 to join crosstown competitor Power 105.1 (WWPR).

As a rapper, Martinez received praise for her bars when she was featured on the remix for Lil' Kim's "Not Tonight" (1996). She later released two albums, Up Close and Personal (2001) and Animal House (2002), before retiring in 2003 to pursue her radio and entrepreneurial careers. As of 2024, she also hosts her own podcast through her YouTube channel, IRL (short for In Real Life) in which she interviews various entertainment industry figures, of all ages.

== Early life ==
Martinez was born on January 9, 1971, in Brooklyn, a borough of New York City. Her father is Puerto Rican and her mother is of Puerto Rican, Cuban and Dominican descent. She was raised by her single mother in Brooklyn as well as Washington Heights. As a teenager, she would often drink with her friends, smoke marijuana, and listen to music. She was often absent from school. As a result, her mother decided to move her to Miami to live with her aunt. Her mother later moved as well where she became the programming manager for radio station WPOW. Martinez later gained an internship at the station.

== Radio career ==
Martinez got her first break in FM broadcasting in 1986, at the age of 15, answering hotlines at the urban radio station WQHT, known publicly as Hot 97. While there, she met popular DJ Funkmaster Flex, and began working as his protégé. Martinez quickly picked-up on the craft and skills of running a successful radio program. She hosted the Afternoon Drive segments, on weekdays, alongside fellow comrade DJ Enuff, where she interviewed some of the biggest names in music, such as Jay-Z, DMX, and Mariah Carey, among others. During her tenure, she also worked alongside Wendy Williams, with whom she reportedly clashed with. She resigned from Hot 97 on June 18, 2014, but confirmed that she was on good terms with former comrades Ebro Darden, Funkmaster Flex and Cipha Sounds. Subsequently, it was announced that she had signed on with Hot 97's main New York radio competitor, Power 105.1 (WWPR-FM), on June 19, 2014.

In November 2014, Martinez was signed to a management deal with Jay-Z's Roc Nation.

Martinez won the National Association of Broadcasters (NAB) Marconi Radio Award for "Major Market Personality of the Year" in 2018, and was inducted into the Radio Hall of Fame in 2020.

== Music career ==
In 1996, Martinez was encouraged to give rapping a shot by friend KRS-One. She appeared on his track, "Heartbeat", from his 1997 album I Got Next. After the song gained a strong fan following, another friend, Lil' Kim, offered her a spot on the "Ladies' Night" remix of her song "Not Tonight", for the soundtrack to the action buddy comedy-drama film, Nothing to Lose (1997). Also featured on the remix were Missy Elliott, Lisa "Left Eye" Lopes (of TLC) and Da Brat; the quintet enjoyed one of the most successful singles of 1997. The "Ladies' Night" remix peaked on the Billboard Hot 100 chart at No. 6, reached No. 3 on the Hot R&B/Hip-Hop Songs and No. 2 on the Hot Rap Songs charts, respectively. The CD-single sold over one million copies and was certified platinum by the Recording Industry Association of America that November. All five women were then featured in a live performance of the song at the 1997 MTV Video Music Awards. The song was also nominated at the 40th Annual Grammy Awards for Best Rap Performance by a Duo or Group at the 1998 ceremony.

A major record label battle began, in an effort to sign Martinez to a recording contract; her collaborations with other artists' music was in high demand. She recorded songs with yet another close friend, singer Mary J. Blige ("Christmas in the City"), as well as Cuban Link ("Freak Out"), N.O.R.E. ("Oh No" remix), Beenie Man ("Tell Me" remix) and Funkmaster Flex & Big Kap's compilation album The Tunnel ("Wow"). She also recorded interludes for mixtapes by Kid Capri, DJ Clue and DJ Kayslay. In 2001, she appeared in the music video for Jay-Z and R. Kelly's single "Guilty Until Proven Innocent".

On April 17, 2001, she released her debut studio album, Up Close and Personal. The album included production by Salaam Remi, Knobody, Rockwilder and the Neptunes, as well as guest appearances by Jay-Z, Snoop Dogg, Mary J. Blige, Wyclef Jean, Busta Rhymes, The Lox, Fat Joe, Prodigy and Kool G. Rap, among others. The first single, "Dem Thangz" was produced by the Neptunes, and featured background vocals by Neptunes member Pharrell Williams and former Tribe Called Quest rapper Q-Tip. The album debuted at No. 32 on the Billboard 200, and No. 7 on the Billboard Top R&B/Hip-Hop Albums chart, selling 69,000 in its first week. The second single, "Coast 2 Coast (Suavamente)", featuring Haitian artist Wyclef Jean, re-sparked interest in the album. She promoted the album with magazine posters, in-store signings, club appearances and television appearances with MTV and BET.

Following her debut album's release, Martinez began work on a second record, 2002's Animal House. In order to build anticipation for the record, she appeared on BET's Rap City and began a nationwide radio tour. She recorded a verse for the remix to her artist Sacario's record "Live Big". It became the No. 1 record in the tri-state area, and coincided with the release of the lead single off of her second album, "If I Could Go", which coincidentally also featured Sacario, as well as singer Lil' Mo. "If I Could Go" became a huge crossover hit on pop radio, climbing into the Top 20 of the Billboard Hot 100, peaking at No. 15. It became the most-played song on urban radio during the summer of 2002. Martinez's sophomore studio album, Animal House (named after her production company and recording posse), was released on August 21, 2002. It entered the Billboard 200 at No. 11, and the Top R&B/Hip-Hop Albums chart at No. 6, selling 92,000 units in its first week. The follow-up single, "Take You Home", featuring R&B singer Kelis, became a minor hit, reaching the bottom end of the Billboard Hot 100. Despite its moderate commercial performance, the album was more strongly received by critics and fans. Following the release of the album, she was featured on a remix for former Elektra Records labelmate Lil' Mo's track, "Gangsta", and Nina Sky's single "Time to Go". Following this, in 2003, she announced she was retiring from the music industry to concentrate on her passions as a radio personality and other ventures.

She appeared in the album intro with La La Anthony for singer-songwriter Babyface's October 2022 album, Girls Night Out.

== Other ventures ==
Martinez provided voiceover of Hot 97 in the 2001 Xbox video game Project Gotham Racing.

In 2002, Martinez was hired to be a judge on the second season of American Idol, but quit after a few days of auditions, citing discomfort with crushing the dreams of auditioners.

In 2008, she became the opening speaker for then-president of the United States, Barack Obama. In 2022, she attended a summit with former first lady, Michelle Obama, whom she later invited to appear on her radio show.

In June 2016, she released an autobiographical novel titled My Voice: A Memoir.

In May 2018, to further promote and support rapper J. Cole's album, KOD, Martinez conducted an in-house interview with him in producer Salaam Remi's house in Miami. It had received over four million views on YouTube, as of September 2023.

Then, in 2019, she hosted a We TV interview series called the Untold Stories of Hip-Hop, but in 2020, the show was cancelled.

On March 4, 2020, Martinez received a degree for honorary doctor of fine arts at Rutgers University–Newark.

In June 2023, in celebration of the fiftieth anniversary of the foundation of hip hop music, she hosted an ABC special titled Soul of a Nation: Hip Hop at 50; she is also the executive producer of the project.

In November 2026, her unaired Hot 97 interview with rapper Tupac Shakur, held in 1996, was released as a four-part podcast series, titled The Tupac Tapes, on Netflix.

=== Acting ===
As an actress, Martinez received a small role in the independent hip hop film, Blood Is Thicker Than Water. In 2002, Martinez appeared in a cameo on the Damon Dash-directed comedy, Paper Soldiers, which starred Kevin Hart. That October, she appeared in Brown Sugar, starring Taye Diggs, Queen Latifah and Sanaa Lathan. Martinez was also noticed in an uncredited appearance as a drug dealer's car girl in the film, Paid in Full. The film itself was based on the 1980s crack epidemic in New York City and its war on drugs, as well as the partnership between Azie Faison, Rich Porter and Alpo Martinez. In 2005, Martinez reunited with Dash for State Property 2, the sequel to the 2002 film, which starred rapper Beanie Sigel.

She also appeared in Video Girl, with actress Meagan Good in 2011 and Generation Um... in 2012, respectively. Martinez was one of the few Hot 97 personnel to appear on the VH1 reality docu-comedy television series, This Is Hot 97, which premiered in 2014, but was later cancelled after one season. The show was produced by Mona Scott-Young, co-founder of Violator Management, founder of Monami Productions and creator of Love & Hip Hop.

=== Podcasting ===
In 2022, it was announced that Martinez would launch a podcast on iHeartRadio, Apple Music and YouTube called IRL. It has been conductive in interviews with Lauren London, Kim Kardashian, Taraji P. Henson, Kelly Rowland, Mary J. Blige and Janelle Monáe, among others.

=== Charity work ===
In 2014, Martinez ran the 2014 New York City Marathon in support of CC Sabathia's charity, the PitCCh In Foundation.

== Personal life ==
She has a son, Niko Ruffin, born in a New York City hospital in June 2003. Her son's father is Tamir Ruffin, better known as Nokio the N-Tity, the founder and bandleader of R&B group Dru Hill.

Martinez's close friend is singer Mary J. Blige, who coincidentally was born two days after her, and is also the godmother of Martinez's son, Niko.

In late 2019, it was revealed that she had sustained major injuries, including a fractured lumbar and shattered vertebrae, in a serious car accident.

== Awards and nominations ==
| Year | Nominee / work | Award | Result |
|---|---|---|---|
| 1998 | "Not Tonight" (Ladies Night Mix) | Grammy Award for Best Rap Performance by a Duo or Group | Nominated |
| 2002 | —N/a | BET Award for Best Female Hip-Hop Artist | Nominated |
| 2018 | Major Market | NAB Marconi Radio Award for Personality of the Year | Won |
| Radio Hall of Fame | 2020 Inductee | —N/a | Won |
| Rutgers University Honorary Degree | 2020 Honoree | —N/a | Won |

== Discography ==
=== Studio albums ===
| Year | Album | Peak chart positions | |
| Year | Album | U.S. | U.S. R&B |
|---|---|---|---|
| 2001 | Up Close and Personal: Released: April 17, 2001; Label: Elektra; Format: CD; digital download | 32 | 7 |
| 2002 | Animal House: Released: August 20, 2002; Label: Elektra; Format: CD; digital download | 11 | 6 |

== Singles ==
| Year | Song | Peak chart positions | | | | Album |
| Year | Song | US | U.S. R&B | U.S. Rap | UK | Album |
|---|---|---|---|---|---|---|
| 2000 | "Mi Amor" (featuring Jay-Z) | — | 51 | — | — | Up Close and Personal |
| 2001 | "Dem Thangs" | — | 80 | 24 | — | Up Close and Personal |
| 2001 | "Coast 2 Coast" | — | — | — | — | Up Close and Personal |
| 2002 | "If I Could Go" (featuring Lil' Mo & Sacario) | 15 | 26 | 11 | 61 | Animal House |
| 2003 | "Take You Home" (featuring Kelis) | 85 | 62 | — | — | Animal House |
"—" denotes a title that did not chart, or was not released in that territory.

== See also ==
- Dominican American
- Mami (hip hop)
- Nuyorican
- Puerto Ricans in New York City
