= Pam Sheyne =

Songwriter and musical artist

- Origin: Auckland, New Zealand
- Genres: Pop; rock; country; r&b
- Occupations: Songwriter; vocal producer
- Instruments: Guitar, backing vocals
- Years active: 1986–present
- Website: www.pamelasheyne.com

Pamela Sheyne is a New Zealand-born songwriter, vocal producer, and mentor. A co-writer of Christina Aguilera's "Genie in a Bottle", her songs have been recorded by artists including Dream, Hayley Westenra, Backstreet Boys, M2M and Jessica Simpson. She is an Ivor Novello award-winner and a Grammy nominee.

== Biography ==
Sheyne was born in Auckland, New Zealand and moved to the United Kingdom in her late teens. She spent several years in London as a session singer and backing vocalist.

After initial success in the UK, Sheyne collaborated with David Frank and Steve Kipner to create "Genie in a Bottle", Christina Aguilera’s first single. The song hit #1 in 22 countries including the US and the UK and won an Ivor Novello Award for International Hit of the Year. In 1999, she moved to Los Angeles following 12 years of traveling between the US and UK for writing and recording sessions.

Sheyne co-wrote "Miracles Happen (When You Believe)" for Disney's The Princess Diaries, which was nominated for an ALMA Award for Outstanding Song in a Motion Picture Soundtrack. She wrote the end themes for Confessions of A Teenage Drama Queen, and the film The Young Victoria. She wrote and sang the theme tune to NBC’s Dance Your Ass Off.

Sheyne is a mentor for songwriters and attends songwriting camps and retreats. She founded SongWriterCamps with business partner Richard Harris in 2018. She is a founding member of Songwriters of North America (SONA), a grassroots advocacy group based in Los Angeles that campaigns for songwriter rights.

== Selected discography ==
Year	Artist/Project	Work	Credit	Notes
1996	Dara Rolins	"She Wants You"	Written with Tim Lawson	Single
1998	Billie Piper	Yours Faithfully	Co-producer, co-writter	Co-produced the album, co-wrote single She Wants You
1999	Christina Aguilera	"Genie in a Bottle"	Co-written with David Frank and Steve Kipner	Single from album Christina Aguilera
2000	Dream	"He Loves U Not"	Co-written with Steve Kipner, David Frank	Debut single
2001	Jessica Simpson	"Irresistible"	Co-written with Arnthor Birgisson, Anders Bagge	Single from album Irresistible
2001	The Princess Diaries soundtracks	"Miracles Happen (When You Believe)"	Co-writer	Film, Soundtrack
2001	Tina Arena	"If You Ever"	Co-written with Ben Robbins	Album cut from Just Me
2002	Dance Your Ass Off	Theme song	Co-writer and performer	NBC series
2004	Confessions of a Teenage Drama Queen	"Drama Queen (That Girl)"	Co-writer	Soundtrack
2004	Sandy Mölling	Unexpected	Co-producer	Album
2006	Corinne Bailey Rae	"Till It Happens to You"	Co-writer	Album cut from Corinne Bailey Rae
2007	Seal	"You Get Me"	Co-writer	Single/album cut
2007	Mutya Buena	"Just a Little Bit"	Co-written with Eg White	Single
2008	Miley Cyrus	"Old Blue Jeans"	Co-writer	Album cut as Hannah Montana
2009	CeCe Winans	"For Love Alone"	Co-writer	Album cut
2009	The Young Victoria	End title theme	Co-writer	Performed by Sinéad O'Connor Film
2017	Camila Cabello	"Crying in the Club"	Co-written with Camila Cabello, Sia, Benny Blanco, Happy Perez, David Frank, Steve Kipner	Interpolates "Genie in a Bottle"; debut single

== See also ==
Songs written by Pam Sheyne
