= If I Could Go! =

2002 single by Angie Martinez

Single by Angie Martinez featuring Lil' Mo and Sacario

from the album Animal House
- B-side: "Coast 2 Coast (Suavemente)" (hip hop version)
- Released: May 28, 2002
- Studio: West Wing (Connecticut, US); Battery (New York City)
- Length: 4:05
- Label: Elektra
- Songwriters: Angela Martinez; Jamar Austin; Ricardo Thomas; Cynthia Loving
- Producer: Rick Rock

Angie Martinez singles chronology
"Coast 2 Coast (Suavamente)" (2001)	"If I Could Go!" (2002)	"Take You Home" (2003)

Lil' Mo singles chronology
"Gangsta (Love 4 the Streets)" (2001)	"If I Could Go!" (2002)	"4Ever" (2003)

"If I Could Go!" is the first single released from American rapper Angie Martinez's second studio album, Animal House (2002). The track features rapper Sacario and singer Lil Mo and was produced by Rick Rock. Rick Rock co-wrote the song with the three performers. It is Martinez's highest-charting song to date on the US Billboard Hot 100, peaking at number 15. The song won two Certified BDS Spin Awards for 50,000 radio spins and 100,000 radio spins.

== Song information ==
According to the album liner notes, "If I Could Go" was recorded at Battery Studios in New York City and Sacario's former recording studio, West Wing, in Connecticut. The song was mixed at Right Track Studios by Supa Engineer Duro.

== Music video ==
The video was directed by Film Director Steve Carr.

== Track listings ==
UK CD and 12-inch single; Australian CD single

1. "If I Could Go!" (radio edit) – 3:58
2. "If I Could Go!" (album version) – 4:06
3. "Coast 2 Coast (Suavemente)" (hip hop version) – 3:28

European CD single

1. "If I Could Go!" (album version) – 4:06
2. "Coast 2 Coast (Suavemente)" (hip hop version) – 3:28

== Credits and personnel ==
Credits are lifted from the US promo CD liner notes.

Studios

- Recorded at West Wing Studios (Connecticut, US) and Battery Studios (New York City)
- Mixed at Right Track Studios (New York City)
- Mastered at Sterling Sound (New York City)

Personnel

- Angie Martinez – writing
- Jamar Austin – writing
- Ricardo Thomas – writing
- Cynthia Loving – writing
- Rick Rock – production
- D. Boog "Nocko" – recording
- Carlisle Young – recording
- Super Engineer Duro – mixing
- Chris Gehringer – mastering

== Charts ==
=== Weekly charts ===
Chart (2002–2003)	Peak position
Australia Hitseekers (ARIA)	13
Canada (Nielsen SoundScan)	68
Germany (GfK)	47
UK Singles (Official Charts)	61
UK Hip Hop/R&B (Official Charts)	15
US Billboard Hot 100	15
US Hot R&B/Hip-Hop Songs (Billboard)	26
US Hot Rap Songs (Billboard)	11
US Pop Airplay (Billboard)	11
US Rhythmic Airplay (Billboard)	7

=== Year-end charts ===
Chart (2002)	Position
US Billboard Hot 100	69
US Hot R&B/Hip-Hop Singles & Tracks (Billboard)	89
US Mainstream Top 40 (Billboard)	56
US Rhythmic Top 40 (Billboard)	19

Chart (2003)	Position
US Mainstream Top 40 (Billboard)	95

== Release history ==
Region	Date	Format(s)	Label(s)	Ref.
United States	May 28, 2002	Rhythmic contemporary; urban radio	Elektra	
United States	July 22, 2002	Contemporary hit radio	Elektra	
Australia	October 21, 2002	CD	Elektra	
United Kingdom	February 3, 2003	12-inch vinyl; CD	Elektra	

== Usage in media ==
"If I Could Go!" is featured on The Transporter movie soundtrack. The song is included on the NBA Live 2003 video game soundtrack. The soundtrack sold 1.3 million copies, becoming the first video game soundtrack in history to be Certified Platinum by the RIAA, which led to it being inducted into the Guinness World Records as the "first officially-released video game soundtrack to be RIAA certified platinum". According to Guinness World Records, NBA Live 2003 Soundtrack went Platinum in only six months.
