= Jessica Simpson discography =

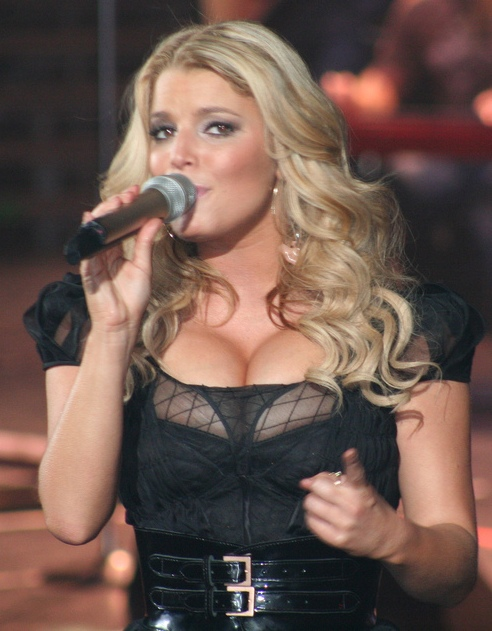
- Simpson performing at a concert in January 2009
- Studio albums: 7
- Extended plays: 2
- Compilation albums: 4
- Singles: 19
- Video albums: 3
- Music videos: 15

American singer Jessica Simpson has released seven studio albums, one extended play, four compilation albums, three video albums, nineteen singles, and fifteen music videos. Her debut album, Sweet Kisses (1999), was released through Columbia Records, reached number 25 on the US Billboard 200 albums chart, and was certified double-platinum by the Recording Industry Association of America (RIAA). The album sold 1.9 million copies in the US and produced three singles. Simpson's debut single, "I Wanna Love You Forever", reached number 3 on the Billboard Hot 100 and was certified platinum by the RIAA. In 2001, Simpson released her second studio effort, titled Irresistible, which failed to match the success of Sweet Kisses. Irresistible peaked at number 6 in the United States and has sold 755,000 copies. Her third studio album, In This Skin, was released in August 2003. Guided by the publicity of her reality TV show, Newlyweds, that album became the best-selling effort of her career, achieving a peak position of number 2 and triple platinum certification in the US. By 2009, In This Skin had sold 2.9 million copies in the US and produced four singles. In 2004, Simpson released her fourth studio and her first Christmas album, Rejoyce: The Christmas Album. It reached number 14 in the US and was certified gold by the RIAA. As of February 2009, Rejoyce has sold 669,000 copies in the US.

In 2006, following a move to Epic Records, Simpson released her fifth studio album, A Public Affair. The album debuted and peaked at number 5 in the US and was certified gold by the RIAA. A Public Affair has sold 300,000 copies in the US and spawned three singles. The album's title track, the second single from the album, reached number 14 on the Hot 100 and topped the Billboard Hot Dance Club Play chart. The single was eventually certified gold by the RIAA. After deciding to return to her roots of country music in 2008, Simpson signed a record deal with Columbia Nashville, the country imprint of Columbia Records, and released Do You Know, her sixth studio and first country album. The album debuted at number 4 on the Billboard 200 and number 1 on the Billboard Top Country Albums chart, and has shifted 173,000 copies. Simpson had departed from Sony Music by 2010 and signed a record deal with Eleveneleven records. In October 2010, Sony released a compilation album entitled Playlist: The Very Best of Jessica Simpson. Her seventh studio and second holiday album, Happy Christmas, was released in November 2010 through Primary Wave. The album peaked at number 123 on the Billboard 200. As of 2023, she has sold 20 million albums worldwide.

== Albums ==
=== Studio albums ===
Title	Album details	Peak chart positions										Sales	Certifications
Title	Album details	US	AUS	AUT	CAN	GER	IRE	JPN	SCO	SWI	UK	Sales	Certifications
Sweet Kisses	Released: November 23, 1999; Label: Columbia; Format: CD, cassette, vinyl	25	52	43	34	44	—	16	51	5	36	World: 4,000,000; US: 1,900,000; JPN: 118,350; SGP: 5,000	RIAA: 2× Platinum; IFPI NOR: Gold; MC: Platinum; RIAJ: Gold
Irresistible	Released: May 25, 2001; Label: Columbia; Format: CD, cassette, vinyl	6	81	58	13	34	—	24	—	15	103	World: 2,000,000; US: 755,000; JPN: 100,000; KOR: 6,821; SGP: 2,000	RIAA: Gold; MC: Gold; RIAJ: Gold
In This Skin	Released: August 19, 2003; Label: Columbia; Format: CD, digital download, vinyl	2	13	—	45	—	27	89	35	78	36	World: 7,000,000; US: 2,900,000; JPN: 10,000; KOR: 3,003	RIAA: 3× Platinum; ARIA: Platinum; MC: Gold; BPI: Silver
ReJoyce: The Christmas Album	Released: November 23, 2004; Label: Columbia; Format: CD, digital download, vinyl	14	—	—	—	—	—	—	—	—	—	US: 669,000	RIAA: Gold
A Public Affair	Released: August 26, 2006; Label: Epic; Format: CD, digital download	5	33	—	6	—	32	63	76	—	65	World: 1,000,000; US: 500,000	RIAA: Gold; MC: Gold
Do You Know	Released: September 5, 2008; Label: Epic, Columbia Nashville; Format: CD, digital download	4	95	—	13	—	—	—	—	—	—	US: 300,000	
Happy Christmas	Released: November 22, 2010; Label: Primary Wave, EMI, Eleveneleven; Format: CD, digital download	123	—	—	—	—	—	—	—	—	—	US: 110,000	
"—" denotes items which failed to chart or was not released in that country.

=== Compilation albums ===
Title	Album details	Peak chart positions
Title	Album details	US Dance
This Is the Remix	Released: July 2, 2002; Label: Columbia; Format: CD, digital download, vinyl	18
A Special Christmas Collection	Released: September 14, 2004; Label: Sony BMG; Format: CD, digital download	—
Playlist: The Very Best of Jessica Simpson	Released: October 12, 2010; Label: Epic, Legacy; Format: CD, digital download	—
"—" denotes items which failed to chart or was not released in that country.

=== Box sets ===
List of albums
Title	Album details
Triple Feature	Released: November 17, 2009; Label: Sony BMG; Format: CD, digital download

== Extended plays ==
List of EPs, with selected details
Title	Details
Nashville Canyon, Part 1	Released: March 21, 2025; Label: Nashville Canyon; Format: Digital download, streaming
Nashville Canyon, Part 2	Released: September 5, 2025; Label: Nashville Canyon; Format: Digital download, streaming

== Singles ==
=== As main artist ===
Title	Year	Peak chart positions										Sales	Certifications	Album
Title	Year	US	AUS	BEL (FL)	CAN	GER	IRE	SCO	SWE	SWI	UK	Sales	Certifications	Album
"I Wanna Love You Forever"	1999	3	9	11	9	27	13	10	5	7	7	UK: 103,000	RIAA: Platinum; ARIA: Platinum; BEA: Gold; IFPI SWE: Gold	Sweet Kisses
"Where You Are" (featuring Nick Lachey)	2000	62	—	—	22	—	—	—	—	—	—			Sweet Kisses
"I Think I'm in Love with You"	2000	21	10	36	2	63	24	18	47	41	15		ARIA: Gold; RMNZ: Gold	Sweet Kisses
"Irresistible"	2001	15	21	46	16	33	18	11	17	20	11		ARIA: Gold; IFPI SWE: Gold	Irresistible
"A Little Bit"	2001	—	62	—	—	—	—	—	—	—	—			Irresistible
"Sweetest Sin"	2003	—	—	—	—	—	—	—	—	—	—			In This Skin
"With You"	2003	14	4	—	—	—	11	6	—	—	7	UK: 29,000	RIAA: Gold; ARIA: Platinum	In This Skin
"Take My Breath Away"	2004	20	15	32	10	—	—	—	43	—	159		RIAA: Gold; ARIA: Gold	In This Skin
"Angels"	2004	—^{[A]}	27	—	—	—	—	—	—	—	—			In This Skin
"These Boots Are Made for Walkin'"	2005	14	2	^{[B]}	—	17	2	2	31	16	4	UK: 250,000	RIAA: Gold; ARIA: Platinum; RMNZ: Gold	The Dukes of Hazzard
"A Public Affair"	2006	14	17	—	—	72	9	10	36	—	20	UK: 25,800	RIAA: Gold	A Public Affair
"I Belong to Me"	2006	—^{[C]}	—	—	—	—	—	—	—	—	—			A Public Affair
"Come On Over"	2008	65	—	—	60	—	—	—	—	—	—			Do You Know
"Remember That"	2008	—^{[D]}	—	—	88	—	—	—	—	—	—			Do You Know
"Use My Heart Against Me"	2025	—	—	—	—	—	—	—	—	—	—			Nashville Canyon, Part 1
"Leave"	2025	—	—	—	—	—	—	—	—	—	—			Nashville Canyon, Part 1
"Fade"	2025	—	—	—	—	—	—	—	—	—	—			Nashville Canyon, Part 2
"Hopeless Romance"	2025	—	—	—	—	—	—	—	—	—	—			Nashville Canyon, Part 2
"—" denotes items which failed to chart or was not released in that country.

=== Promotional singles ===
Title	Year	Album
"Fly"	2004	In This Skin
"Baby, It's Cold Outside"	2004	ReJoyce: The Christmas Album
"Let It Snow! Let It Snow! Let It Snow!"	2004	ReJoyce: The Christmas Album
"O Holy Night"	2004	ReJoyce: The Christmas Album
"What Christmas Means to Me"	2004	ReJoyce: The Christmas Album
"You Spin Me Round (Like a Record)"	2006	A Public Affair
"Pray Out Loud"	2009	Do You Know
"Who We Are"	2010	Non-album single
"My Only Wish"	2010	Happy Christmas
"Particles"	2021	Non-album single

== Other charted songs ==
Title	Year	Peak chart positions	Album
Title	Year	US A/C	Album
"What Christmas Means to Me"	2004	8	Rejoyce: The Christmas Album
"Let It Snow! Let It Snow! Let It Snow!"	2004	20	Rejoyce: The Christmas Album
"—" denotes items which failed to chart or was not released in that country.

== Other appearances ==
Title	Year	Other artist(s)	Album
"Did You Ever Love Somebody"	1999	—N/a	Songs from Dawson's Creek
"Final Heartbreak"	2000	—N/a	Rugrats in Paris
"Rockin' Around the Christmas Tree"	2000	Rosie O'Donnell	Another Rosie Christmas
"Tal vez Es Amor"	2001	—N/a	Divas En Espanol
"Part of Your World"	2002	—N/a	Disneymania
"A Whole New World"	2005	Nick Lachey	Disneymania 3

== Videography ==
List of albums
Title	Album details	Certifications
Dream Chaser	Released: January 22, 2002; Label: Sony; Format: DVD, VHS	
Sweetest Sin/With You	Released: November 25, 2003; Label: Sony; Format: DVD	
Reality Tour Live	Released: November 23, 2004; Label: Sony; Format: DVD	RIAA: Platinum

=== Music videos ===
Song	Year	Director
"I Wanna Love You Forever"	1999	Bille Woodruff
"Where You Are" (featuring Nick Lachey)	2000	Kevin Bray
"I Think I'm in Love with You"	2000	Nigel Dick
"My Everything" (98 Degrees)	2000	
"Irresistible"	2001	Simon Brand
"A Little Bit"	2001	Hype Williams
"Irresistible (So So Def Remix)" (featuring Lil' Bow Wow)	2002	Cameron Casey
"Sweetest Sin"	2003	Dean Paraskevopoulos
"With You"	2003	Elliott Lester
"Take My Breath Away"	2004	Chris Applebaum
"Angels"	2004	Matthew Rolston
"A Whole New World"	2004	Elliott Lester
"Let It Snow, Let It Snow, Let It Snow"	2004	
"O Holy Night"	2004	
"These Boots Are Made for Walkin'"	2005	Brett Ratner
"A Public Affair"	2006	Brett Ratner
"I Belong to Me"	2006	Matthew Rolston
"You Don't Think I'm Funny Anymore" (Willie Nelson)	2008	
"Come on Over"	2008	Liz Friedlander
"Particles"	2021	Justin Coloma

== Notes ==
Notes

- A: "Angels" did not enter the Billboard Hot 100, but peaked at number 6 on the Bubbling Under Hot 100 Singles chart.
- B: "These Boots Are Made for Walkin'" did not enter Belgium's Ultratop 50 Flanders chart, but it did chart at number 10 on the Ultratip chart.
- C: "I Belong to Me" did not enter the Billboard Hot 100, but peaked at number 10 on the Bubbling Under Hot 100 Singles chart.
- D: "Remember That" did not enter the Billboard Hot 100, but peaked at number 1 on the Bubbling Under Hot 100 Singles chart.
- E: "You Spin Me Round (Like a Record)" did not enter the Billboard Hot 100, but peaked at number 21 on the Bubbling Under Hot 100 Singles chart.
