= I Can't =

I Can't may refer to:

- "I Can't" (Foxy Brown song), 1999
- "I Can't" (Lisa Brokop song), 2008, covered by Reba McEntire
- "I Can't", a song by Radiohead from the 1993 album Pablo Honey
- "I Can't", a song by Gucci Mane from the 2016 album The Return of East Atlanta Santa
- "I Can't" (Friday Night Lights), an episode of the TV series Friday Night Lights
