= Never Be the Same =

Never Be the Same may refer to:

- Never Be the Same (album), by Victoria Banks, 2011
- "Never Be the Same" (Camila Cabello song), 2017
- "Never Be the Same" (Christopher Cross song), 1979
- "Never Be the Same" (Jessica Mauboy song), 2014
- "Never Be the Same" (Red song), 2009

== See also ==
- "I'll Never Be the Same", song recorded by Frank Sinatra and many others
- Never Be the Same Again (disambiguation)
- Never Gonna Be the Same (disambiguation)
