= My Only Wish =

My Only Wish may refer to:

- "My Only Wish" (song), by Jessica Simpson
- "My Only Wish (This Year)", by Britney Spears
