= Never Be the Same (album) =

Studio album by Victoria Banks
- Released: April 26, 2011
- Genre: Country
- Length: 38:51
- Label: On Ramp/EMI Canada
- Producer: Victoria Banks

Victoria Banks chronology
When You Can Fly (2009)	Never Be the Same (2011)	Indigo (2014)

Singles from Never Be the Same
- 1. "Come On" Released: February 14, 2011; 2. "I'm Gone" Released: July 11, 2011; 3. "Never Be the Same" Released: October 24, 2011; 4. "Jackson" Released: May 7, 2012; 5. "Barefoot Girl" Released: August 2012

Professional ratings
Review scores
Source	Rating
Roughstock	3.5/5 stars

Never Be the Same is the third studio album by Canadian country music artist Victoria Banks. It was released on April 26, 2011 by On Ramp Records/EMI Canada. Banks co-wrote the first single, "Come On," with The JaneDear Girls. "Remember That" was previously recorded by Jessica Simpson on her 2008 album Do You Know.

== Track listing ==
No.	Title	Writer(s)	Length
1.	"Come On"	Victoria Banks, Susan Brown, Danielle Leverett	3:18
2.	"Jackson"	Banks	4:09
3.	"Never Be the Same"	Banks, Mary Sue Englund	4:16
4.	"I'm Gone"	Banks	2:24
5.	"Feel Like a Kid Again"	Banks, John Lancaster, Rachel Proctor	3:31
6.	"Somebody Does"	Banks, Proctor, Julie Roberts	3:26
7.	"Blue as My Broken Heart"	Banks, Dani Flowers, Proctor	4:03
8.	"Barefoot Girl"	Banks, Lancaster, Proctor	3:19
9.	"Mama Said Don't"	Banks, Proctor, Roberts	2:56
10.	"Remember That"	Banks, Proctor	3:29
11.	"The Other Side"	Banks	4:00
Total length:			38:51
