= Come On Over (Jessica Simpson song) =

2008 single by Jessica Simpson

"Come on Over"

Single by Jessica Simpson

from the album Do You Know
- Released: June 16, 2008
- Studio: Blackbird Studio (Nashville, TN)
- Genre: Country pop
- Length: 2:54
- Label: Columbia Nashville
- Songwriters: Rachel Proctor; Victoria Banks; Jessica Simpson
- Producers: Brett James; John Shanks

Jessica Simpson singles chronology
"I Belong to Me" (2006)	"Come on Over" (2008)	"Remember That" (2008)

Music video
- "Come On Over" on Youtube.com

"Come on Over" is a song by American recording artist Jessica Simpson from her sixth studio album, Do You Know (2008). The song was penned by country musician Rachel Proctor, Victoria Banks, and Simpson herself, marking her third single she had a writer's credit on following "With You" (2003) and "A Public Affair" (2006). It was released on June 16, 2008 via Columbia Nashville to country radio, becoming Simpson's first single released to the format.

The song was favorably reviewed, with the production being compared to artists like Shania Twain. In the United States, "Come on Over" became the most-added song to country radio the week of June 6, 2008, debuting at number 41 on the Billboard Hot Country Songs chart. It broke a record held by Miranda Lambert ("Me and Charlie Talking") and Brad Cotter ("I Meant To") for highest-debuting first chart entry by a solo artist; both artists debuted at number 42 on that same chart. On July 12, 2008, the song peaked at number sixty-five on the Billboard Hot 100. The song peaked at number 18 on the Hot Country Songs chart.

The music video for "Come on Over" was directed by Liz Friedlander and shot in Little Creek Ranch, California. The song was nominated for a 2008 CMT fan-voted online award in the category of best "(What? I've Always Been Country) Crossover Artist".

== Background and theme ==
After the release of her 2006 pop album A Public Affair, Simpson stated she wanted to go back to her roots and do country music because she "has been brought up around country music", and wants to give something back. Simpson had already sung country themed songs previous like "These Boots Are Made for Walkin'". "Come on Over" was co-written by country music artist Rachel Proctor, Victoria Banks and Simpson herself. The lyrics of the uptempo single focus on the narrator's paramour. Simpson said, "The fun thing about the song is that anxiety of wanting the guy to come over right then and there. Everybody's felt that before."

== Music video ==
The music video for "Come on Over" was shot on June 19, 2008. It was directed by Liz Friedlander and shot in Little Creek Ranch, California. The video was premiered on Simpson's official website on July 11. It debuted on the CMT Top 20 countdown on August 1 at number 3 and peaked at number 2 the following week. It reached number on Yahoo!'s Top 100 Country Videos list on August 8. It also peaked at number 16 on GAC Top 20 Countdown.

The video begins with Simpson standing outside her house making a phone call to her love interest. She is then shown inside her house sitting next to the kitchen sink, looking out of the living room windows. In other shots, Simpson sings with a live backing band in a barn house, and sits on the back of a pick-up van. At the end of the video, she is shown sitting in a bathtub after a man is depicted leaving his car; his face is not shown. The video includes a close-up of the bottle for Simpson's fragrance, "Fancy", released in August 2008.

== Critical reception ==
Billboard.com described the song as "Sexy and flirtatious" adding that "'Come On Over' is everything it needs to be—undeniably country and not forced. Under watchful maestro John Shanks and Brett James, Simpson shines on a steel guitar-laden track that finds her pleading with a beau to drop everything for a little loving." Rolling Stone said that "Surprisingly, her first twangy single is a slick treat", and that "Simpson keeps it simple and on a Shania Twain-esque foot-stomper built on energetic acoustic and slide guitars."

The song was nominated for a 2008 CMT fan-voted online award in the category of best "(What? I've Always Been Country) Crossover Artist", but lost to Darius Rucker's "Don't Think I Don't Think About It."

== Chart performance ==
In the United States, "Come on Over" became the most-added song to country radio for the week of June 6, 2008, debuting at number 41 on the Billboard Hot Country Songs chart. It broke a record held by Miranda Lambert ("Me and Charlie Talking") and Brad Cotter ("I Meant To") for highest-debuting first chart entry by a solo artist; both artists debuted at number 42 on that same chart. The song peaked at number 18 on the chart. On July 12, 2008, the song peaked at number sixty-five on the Billboard Hot 100. As of July 2014, "Come on Over" has sold 470,000 paid digital downloads in the United States, according to Nielsen SoundScan.

In Canada, the song debuted at number eighty-eight and peaked at number sixty.

== Track listings ==
- Digital download
1. "Come On Over " – 2:54

== Charts ==
Chart (2008)	Peak position
Canada Hot 100 (Billboard)	60
Canada Country (Billboard)	16
US Billboard Hot 100	65
US Hot Country Songs (Billboard)	18
US Pop 100 (Billboard)	61

== Release history ==
Region	Date	Label	Format
Canada	May 27, 2008	Columbia Nashville	promo single
United States	May 27, 2008	Columbia Nashville	promo single
United States	June 20, 2008	Columbia Nashville	digital download
United States	August 2008	Columbia Nashville	physical single
United Kingdom	October 6, 2008	Epic Records	digital download
