= Remember That (Jessica Simpson song) =

Single by Jessica Simpson

from the album Do You Know
- Released: September 29, 2008
- Genre: Country pop
- Length: 3:44
- Label: Columbia Nashville
- Songwriters: Rachel Proctor; Victoria Banks
- Producers: Brett James; John Shanks

Jessica Simpson singles chronology
"Come On Over" (2008)	"Remember That" (2008)	"Use My Heart Against Me" (2025)

Music video
- "Remember That" on Youtube.com

"Remember That" is a song by American singer Jessica Simpson from her sixth studio album, Do You Know (2008).It was released on September 29, 2008, as the second single from the album. The single was written by Rachel Proctor and Victoria Banks and produced by Brett James and John Shanks. The song is about domestic violence. The song did not make much impact in the United States, peaking at number one on the Billboard Bubbling Under Hot 100, but failing to reach the Billboard Hot 100. However, the song did manage to peak at number forty-two on Billboard Country Songs, and at number eighty-eight in Canada.

== Background and recording ==
"Remember That" was written by Rachel Proctor and Victoria Banks, and produced by Brett James and John Shanks. Proctor wrote the single with Banks a year after her divorce. She developed its concept and "felt compelled" to share it with Banks even though they were not close friends. During the writing session, they shared their domestic violence experiences and completed the lyrics in an hour. Banks said they "wrote it from the heart to try and help other abused women to have the same realization we had". She felt a man would be unable to create a similar song, feeling he would lack “the same personal investment that motivated the lyrics to be written". Ethnomusicologist Chris Wilson described "Remember That" as a "rare exception among cowritten Nashville songs" as its message took precedence over its chances of becoming a "money-making hit". The song was mixed by Luke Wooton, recorded by Jeff Rothschild, and mastered by Andrew Mendelson.

RCA Records pitched the "Remember That" demo to Jessica Simpson as part of her preparation to record a country music album. Simpson chose the genre to reconnect with her roots in Texas and her childhood listening to the style of music. She referenced Reba McEntire, Faith Hill, Shania Twain, and Martina McBride as her inspirations. Simpson cried on first hearing "Remember That", and related to its lyrics due to her past experience with abuse. She said that she had a personal connection with the song. She was quoted as saying, "I sing it with experience.". "Remember That" inspired Simpson to be involved with the songwriting process for the album; she contacted Proctor and Banks for a second collaboration, the album's lead single "Come On Over" (2008).

== Composition and lyrics ==
"Remember That" is about a domestic violence survivor's advice for a woman in a similar situation. Despite its focus on an intimate subject matter, the song is performed from a "removed stance". Lyrics include “With his hands or with his words / you don’t deserve it". Simpson reminds the listener to remember the "whiskey in his whispers and the lies that felt so easy from his lips". Jon Caramanica, writing for The New York Times, interpreted the singer's delivery of the line ("remember how he told you you were stupid") as aimed at critics of her personality on the reality show Newlyweds: Nick and Jessica. Caramanica described the single as "an angry rumination on domestic violence". "Remember That" ends with a coda delivered in the first-person perspective: "Take it from me, I've stood in your shoes."

== Release and promotion ==
"Remember That" was the second single from Simpson's sixth studio album Do You Know (2008). Proctor and Banks wrote cards to North American country radio to promote the song, though the stations refused to play it. Banks questioned if this decision was reached due to the larger ratio of men responsible for music programming or country radio's resistance to Simpson's music. Chris Wilson cited the songwriters' involvement in the promotional process as unusual in the music industry. Despite the lack of airplay, "Remember That" was one of the most downloaded songs in the iTunes Store following the album's release. The single was later included on Simpson's 2010 greatest hits album Playlist: The Very Best of Jessica Simpson.

Simpson performed "Remember That" as part of her debut at the Grand Ole Opry, introducing it as "a very personal song for a lot of women". She sang it during a 2009 concert with Rascal Flatts. Erik Ernst of the Wisconsin State Journal criticized the performance as "herky-jerky and shaky".

== Critical reception ==
Critics had a primarily positive response for "Remember That". Simpson was praised by Rolling Stone's Caryn Ganz Simp as having "tender voice [that] exudes the realism of a gal who’s taken a few knocks in her day", and Caramanica for "f[inding] a backbone" through the single's message and lyrics. Sputnikmusic's Willie noted that Simpson's "passionate vocals" separated "Remember That" from similar songs on abuse. The song's placement on the album also received praise. Caramanica wrote "Remember That" was where Do You Know "finds its groove", and Jennifer Webb of About.com praised how it was paired with "Pray Out Loud" to ease listeners from its focus on abuse. Alternatively, Slant Magazine's Jonathan Keefe dismissed it as "a knockoff of Martina McBride’s shrill domestic violence empowerment anthems".

== Commercial performance ==
The song did not make much impact in the United States, peaking at number one on the Billboard Bubbling Under Hot 100, but failing to reach the Billboard Hot 100. However, the song did manage to peak at number forty-two on the Billboard Country Songs chart, and at number eighty-eight in Canada. To date, "Remember That" has sold 207,000 digital downloads according to Nielsen SoundScan.

== Track listing ==
Digital download

1. "Remember That" – 3:40

== Charts ==
Chart (2008)	Peak position
Canada Hot 100 (Billboard)	88
Canada (Hot Canadian Digital Singles)	68
US Bubbling Under Hot 100 Singles (Billboard)	1
US Hot Country Songs (Billboard)	42
US Hot Digital Songs (Billboard)	67
