= Do You Know (Jessica Simpson album) =

2008 album by Jessica Simpson

Studio album by Jessica Simpson
- Released: September 9, 2008
- Recorded: 2007–2008
- Studio: Henson Recording Studios (Hollywood, Los Angeles, California); Blackbird Studio; County Q; Starstruck Studios; The Boarding House (Nashville, Tennessee)
- Genre: Country-pop
- Length: 41:48
- Label: Epic; Columbia Nashville
- Producer: Brett James; John Shanks

Jessica Simpson chronology
A Public Affair (2006)	Do You Know (2008)	Playlist: The Very Best of Jessica Simpson (2010)

Singles from Do You Know
- 1. "Come on Over" Released: June 24, 2008; 2. "Remember That" Released: September 29, 2008

Do You Know is the sixth studio album by American singer Jessica Simpson. The album was first released digitally on September 5, 2008 for the US iTunes Store and physically on September 9, 2008 in the United States, Canada and Russia through a joint-venture between Columbia Nashville and Epic Records. The album was her first effort in an attempt to cross over with country music. Songwriter Brett James produced the album along with John Shanks. The album debuted at number one on the US Billboard Country Albums and at number four on the US Billboard 200 with sales of 65,000. It received mixed reviews from music critics.

Two singles were released from the record. The lead single, "Come on Over" debuted at number 41 on the Billboard Hot Country Songs chart. It broke a record held by Miranda Lambert ("Me and Charlie Talking") and Brad Cotter ("I Meant To") for highest-debuting first chart entry by a solo artist; both artists debuted at number 42 on that same chart. The song peaked at number 18 on the Hot Country Songs chart. The second single, "Remember That", was released in October, and peaked at number forty-two on the Hot Country Songs chart.

== Background ==
After the release of her 2006 pop album A Public Affair, Simpson stated she wanted to go back to her roots and do country music because she "has been brought up around country music", and wants to give something back. In promotion of the album, Simpson supported Rascal Flatts on tour as their opening act.

== Music and lyrics ==
The album opens with the lead single "Come On Over", which was co-written by country music artist Rachel Proctor, Victoria Banks and Simpson herself. The lyrics of the uptempo single focus on the narrator's paramour. Simpson said, "The fun thing about the song is that anxiety of wanting the guy to come over right then and there. Everybody's felt that before." The next track "Remember That" was co-written by country music writers Rachel Proctor and Victoria Banks. The lyrics of the single focus on a history of anger, violence and the strength that it takes for the victim to leave the abuser.

The seventh track "Still Don't Stop Me" is a ballad in the key of E major about a love gone bad, driven by acoustic guitar and percussion. "When I Loved You Like That", the eighth track, is an up-tempo song in the key of A♭ major backed by electric and steel guitars and percussion. "Do You Know" is a moderate up-tempo song written by Dolly Parton.

== Critical reception ==
Professional ratings
Aggregate scores
Source	Rating
Metacritic	58/100
Review scores
Source	Rating
AllMusic	2/5 stars
Boston Herald	D
Dallas Morning News	C+
Entertainment Weekly	C+
Los Angeles Times	2.5/4 stars
New York Post	3/4 stars
Rolling Stone	3/5 stars
Worcester Telegram	2/4 stars
Slant Magazine	1.5/5 stars
Sputnikmusic	3/5

The album received generally mixed reviews from critics. The album was given a score of 58 out of 100 from Metacritic, indicating "mixed or average reviews" from music critics.

The Dallas Morning News called the first single "Come on Over" a "terrific slice of sultry pop-country", but described the rest of the album as "totally listless". Entertainment Weekly noted: "teaming up with frequent Carrie Underwood songwriter Hillary Lindsey for five tracks was a savvy move, [but] we already have a Carrie Underwood [...] and she probably turned these songs down." The Boston Herald praised the track "Come on Over", but criticized the album for having "way too many embarrassing ballads". The Miami Herald's Howard Cohen concluded that Simpson made a country album that is "undistinguished" and "forgettable".

The Fort Worth Star-Telegram called Simpson's duet with Parton "an oversung misfire." The Los Angeles Times said "Her struggle is most striking on the title track, written by Dolly Parton, who shows up to harmonize with Simpson... The gap between novice and master couldn't be clearer." Slant Magazine said Simpson "operates in precisely three modes as a singer: a mewling, whispered coo; a nasal, dead-eyed middle volume; and belting glory notes at full volume with a strangled, unappealing tone." Allmusic found her performance "unfailingly listless no matter how many theatrical gestures she attempts to cram in her big boring ballad." The Worcester Telegram praised "Come on Over" but found that "Simpson sounds, at best, like a cat being tasered" on the title track. Las Vegas Weekly found the album to be filled with "tiresome ballads" performed with "no tooth, no gut, just monotony and palpable disinterest." Joey Guerra of the Houston Chronicle wrote that although "Simpson co-wrote several of the other tunes ... there's almost no emotional spark or sense of connection."

In a more positive review, the New York Post said that "she's created an album where she consistently shows off her full-bodied voice with solid, yet simple tunes that don't overthink the music." Country Weekly magazine's Chris Neal said that although Simpson seemed to be "trying a little too hard" on some songs, the album was "solid pop-country fare with a lyrical emphasis on sensuality and self-esteem."

== Commercial performance ==
Selling 65,000 copies in its first week, Do You Know debuted at number four on the US Billboard 200, charting for nine weeks. As February 2009, it has sold 173,000 copies in the United States.

== Singles ==
The first single from the album, "Come On Over", was released on June 24, 2008. In the United States, "Come on Over" became the most-added song to country radio for the week of June 6, 2008, debuting at number 41 on the Billboard Hot Country Songs chart. It broke a record held by Miranda Lambert ("Me and Charlie Talking") and Brad Cotter ("I Meant To") for highest-debuting first chart entry by a solo artist; both artists debuted at number 42 on that same chart. The song peaked at number 18 on the chart. On July 12, 2008, the song peaked at number sixty-five on the Billboard Hot 100. As of July 2014, "Come on Over" has sold 470,000 paid digital downloads in the United States, according to Nielsen SoundScan.

The second single, "Remember That", was released in October, and peaked at number forty-two on the Hot Country Songs chart. "Remember That" has sold 207,000 paid digital downloads according to Nielsen Soundscan.

== Track listing ==
Do You Know – Standard edition
No.	Title	Writer(s)	Length
1.	"Come On Over"	Jessica Simpson; Rachel Proctor; Victoria Banks	2:54
2.	"Remember That"	Proctor; Banks	3:44
3.	"Pray Out Loud"	Simpson; Brett James; John Shanks	3:45
4.	"You're My Sunday"	Simpson; Luke Laird; Hillary Lindsey	4:40
5.	"Sipping on History"	Simpson; Laird; H. Lindsey	4:14
6.	"Still Beautiful"	Simpson; James; Shanks	3:44
7.	"Still Don't Stop Me"	Simpson; James; H. Lindsey	3:27
8.	"When I Loved You Like That"	Simpson; H. Lindsey; Aimee Mayo; Chris Lindsey	4:06
9.	"Might as Well Be Making Love"	H. Lindsey; Gordie Sampson; Troy Verges	3:51
10.	"Man Enough"	Simpson; James; Verges	4:19
11.	"Do You Know" (with Dolly Parton)	Parton	5:04
Total length:			41:48

Do You Know – Japanese edition (bonus track)
No.	Title	Writer(s)	Length
12.	"Never Not Beautiful"	Simpson; Laird	3:46
Total length:			45:34

Do You Know – Deluxe edition (bonus DVD)
No.	Title	Length
1.	"The Making of the Video: Come On Over"	28:06
2.	"Come On Over" (Music video)	3:00
Total length:		31:06

== Personnel ==
- Michael Angelos – video producer
- Judy Forde Blair – creative producer
- Tom Bukovac – electric guitar
- John Caldwell – assistant engineer, audio engineer
- Tammie Harris Cleek – creative producer
- Cacee Cobb – A&R
- Shannon Forrest – drums
- Lars Fox – Pro-Tools, digital editing
- Alex Gibson – audio engineer, engineer
- Craig Headen – audio engineer, engineer
- Brett James – background vocals
- Mike Johnson – pedal steel guitar
- Charlie Judge – keyboards, organ, piano, synthesizer strings
- Aaron Kasdorf – assistant engineer, audio engineer
- Troy Lancaster – electric guitar
- Hillary Lindsey – background vocals
- Nate Lowery – production assistant
- Scott McDaniel – creative director
- Andrew Mendelson – mastering
- Carole Ann Mobley – A&R Assistance
- Seth Morton – audio engineer
- Dolly Parton – duet vocals on "Do You Know"
- Devin Pense – direction
- Vance Powell – audio engineer, engineer
- Jeff Rothschild – drums, engineer
- John Shanks – audio production, bass guitar, acoustic guitar, electric guitar, producer
- Jessica Simpson – lead vocals
- Jimmie Lee Sloas – bass guitar
- Shari Sutcliffe – contractor, coordination
- Bryan Sutton – acoustic guitar
- Ilya Toshinsky – acoustic guitar
- Luke Wooten – mixing
- Craig Young – bass guitar
- Jonathan Yudkin – fiddle, mandolin

== Charts ==
=== Weekly charts ===
Chart (2008)	Peak position
Australian Albums (ARIA)	95
Australian Country Albums (ARIA)	6
Canadian Albums (Billboard)	13
US Billboard 200	4
US Digital Albums (Billboard)	3
US Top Country Albums (Billboard)	1

=== Year-end charts ===
Chart (2008)	Peak position
US Top Country Albums (Billboard)	53

== Release history ==
List of release dates, showing region, edition(s), format(s), record label(s), catalog number(s) and reference(s).
Region	Date	Edition(s)	Format(s)	Label(s)	Catalog	Ref.
United States	September 5, 2008	Standard	Digital download	Epic; Columbia Nashville	—N/a	
Canada	September 9, 2008	Standard; deluxe	CD; digital download; CD+DVD	Sony BMG	88697217462 (standard); 88697361142 (deluxe)	
Russia	September 9, 2008	Standard	CD	Sony BMG	88697429082	
United States	September 9, 2008	Standard; deluxe	CD; CD+DVD	Epic; Columbia Nashville	88697217462 (standard); 88697361142 (deluxe)	
Australia	September 13, 2008	Standard	CD; digital download	Sony BMG	B001EWR60K	
New Zealand	September 13, 2008	Standard	CD; digital download	Sony BMG	B001EWR60K	
Germany	September 19, 2008	Standard	CD; digital download	Sony BMG	88697217462	
United Kingdom	October 13, 2008	Standard	CD; digital download	Sony BMG	88697217462	
Japan	December 10, 2008	Standard; deluxe	CD; digital download; CD+DVD	Sony BMG	EICP 1080 (standard); EICP 1081 (deluxe)	
