= CMC Music Awards =

Australian music awards ceremony

- Current: CMC Music Awards 2018
- Awarded for: Favourite artists chosen in an online voting and jury board
- Country: Australia
- First award: 2011
- Final award: 2018

Highlights
- Most wins: Keith Urban (15)

CMC Music Awards was an Australian music awards ceremony held annually from 2011 to 2018. They were provided by the Country Music Channel (CMC), which is owned by Foxtel, and were determined by fan votes. From 2015 the ceremonies were staged in the Brisbane to Gold Coast region. Since 2016 there were three international categories, where Australians residing abroad are acknowledged.

== Categories ==
- Oz Artist of the Year
- Australian Artist of the Year (male)
- Australian Artist of the Year (female)
- New Australian Artist of the Year
- Video of the Year
- International Artist of the Year
- International Video of the Year
- ARIA Highest-selling Album of the Year
- Group/Duo of the Year
- ARIA Highest-selling International Album of the Year
- CMC Hall of Fame

Not all categories were used in each year.

== Ceremonies ==
From 2007 to 2010, CMC awarded only one category, Oz Artist of the Year; Adam Brand won the trophy four years in a row. In March 2011 the ceremony was expanded to four awards – all fan voted.

=== 2011: 1st CMC Music Awards ===
The first ceremony was held at the Hope Estate Winery, Hunter Valley, on 4 March 2011.

Year	Nominee / work	Award	Result
2011	Adam Brand	Oz Artist of the Year	Won
2011	McAlister Kemp	New Australian Artist of the Year	Won
2011	Keith Urban – "'Til Summer Comes Around"	Video of the Year	Won
2011	Taylor Swift	International Artist of the Year	Won

=== 2012: 2nd CMC Music Awards ===
The second ceremony was held at the Hope Estate Winery, Hunter Valley on 16 March 2012 with Jay and Mark O'Shea hosting.

Year	Nominee / work	Award	Result
2012	Jasmine Rae	Oz Artist of the Year	Won
2012	Peter McWhirter	New Australian Artist of the Year	Won
2012	Keith Urban – "Without You"	Video of the Year	Won
2012	Keith Urban	International Artist of the Year	Won
2012	James Blundell	CMC Hall of Fame	inductee

=== 2013: 3rd CMC Music Awards ===
The third ceremony was held at the Hope Estate Winery, Hunter Valley on 15 March 2013.

Year	Nominee / work	Award	Result
2013	The McClymonts	Oz Artist of the Year	Won
2013	Morgan Evans	New Australian Artist of the Year	Won
2013	McAlister Kemp – "Country Proud"	Video of the Year	Won
2013	Keith Urban	International Artist of the Year	Won
2013	Keith Urban – "For You"	International Video of the Year	Won

=== 2014: 4th CMC Music Awards ===
The fourth ceremony was held at the Hope Estate Winery, Hunter Valley on 14 March 2014 with the McClymonts hosting.

Year	Nominee / work	Award	Result
2014	Morgan Evans	Oz Artist of the Year	Won
2014	Morgan Evans	Australian Artist of the Year (male)	Won
2014	Jasmine Rae	Australian Artist of the Year (female)	Won
2014	The Wolfe Brothers	New Australian Artist of the Year	Won
2014	Morgan Evans – "Carry On"	Video of the Year	Won
2014	Taylor Swift	International Artist of the Year	Won
2014	Tim McGraw and Taylor Swift (featuring Keith Urban on guitar) – "Highway Don't Care"	International Video of the Year	Won

=== 2015: 5th CMC Music Awards ===
The fifth ceremony was held at Brisbane's QPAC on 12 March 2015 with Morgan Evans hosting.

Year	Nominee / work	Award	Result
2015	Adam Brand	Oz Artist of the Year	Won
2015	Morgan Evans	Australian Artist of the Year (male)	Won
2015	Amber Lawrence	Australian Artist of the Year (female)	Won
2015	Christie Lamb	New Australian Artist of the Year	Won
2015	Adam Brand – "What Your Love Looks Like"	Video of the Year	Won
2015	Keith Urban	International Artist of the Year	Won
2015	Keith Urban – "Cop Car"	International Video of the Year	Won
2015	The McClymonts	Group/Duo of the Year	Won

=== 2016: 6th CMC Music Awards ===
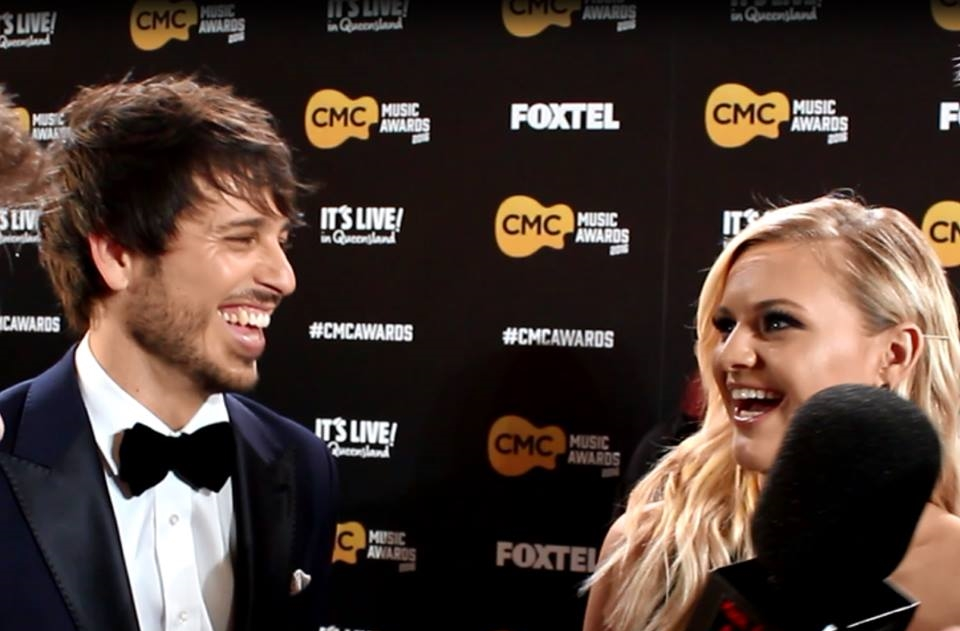
Morgan and Kelsea on the red carpet being interviewed by Planet Country with Big Stu & MJ before hosting the awards.

The sixth ceremony was held at Brisbane's QPAC on 10 March 2016 with Morgan Evans and Kelsea Ballerini hosting.

Year	Nominee / work	Award	Result
2016	Adam Brand	Oz Artist of the Year	Won
2016	Lee Kernaghan	Australian Artist of the Year (male)	Won
2016	Amber Lawrence	Australian Artist of the Year (female)	Won
2016	Caitlyn Shadbolt	New Australian Artist of the Year	Won
2016	Lee Kernaghan – "Spirit of the ANZACs"	Video of the Year	Won
2016	Keith Urban	International Artist of the Year	Won
2016	Keith Urban – "Raise 'Em Up" (featuring Eric Church)	International Video of the Year	Won
2016	Lee Kernaghan – Spirit of the ANZACs	ARIA Highest Selling Album	Won
2016	The Wolfe Brothers	Group/Duo of the Year	Won
2016	Alan Jackson – Angels and Alcohol	ARIA Highest Selling International Album	Won

=== 2017: 7th CMC Music Awards ===
The seventh ceremony was held on 23 March 2017 on the Gold Coast with Morgan Evans hosting.

Year	Nominee / work	Award	Result
2017	Travis Collins	Oz Artist of the Year	Won
2017	Travis Collins	Australian Artist of the Year (male)	Won
2017	Chelsea Basham	Australian Artist of the Year (female)	Won
2017	Fanny Lumsden	New Australian Artist of the Year	Won
2017	Travis Collins – "Call Me Crazy"	Video of the Year	Won
2017	Keith Urban	International Artist of the Year	Won
2017	Keith Urban – "Wasted Time"	International Video of the Year	Won
2017	Adam Brand and the Outlaws – Adam Brand and the Outlaws	ARIA Highest Selling Album	Won
2017	The McClymonts	Group/Duo of the Year	Won
2017	Keith Urban – Ripcord	ARIA Highest Selling International Album	Won
2017	Lee Kernaghan	CMC Hall of Fame	inductee

=== 2018: 8th CMC Music Awards ===
The eighth ceremony was held on 15 March 2018 on the Gold Coast with the McClymonts hosting.

Year	Nominee / work	Award	Result
2018	Adam Brand	Oz Artist of the Year	Won
2018	Travis Collins	Australian Artist of the Year (male)	Won
2018	Christie Lamb	Australian Artist of the Year (female)	Won
2018	Tailgate Drive	New Australian Artist of the Year	Won
2018	Adam Brand – "Drunk"	Video of the Year	Won
2018	Keith Urban	International Artist of the Year	Won
2018	Keith Urban, Carrie Underwood – "The Fighter"	International Video of the Year	Won
2018	The McClymonts	Group/Duo of the Year	Won
