= When You Can Fly =

Studio album by Victoria Banks
- Released: April 14, 2009
- Genre: Country
- Length: 40:12
- Label: On Ramp/EMI Canada

Victoria Banks chronology
You Don't Know Me (2006)	When You Can Fly (2009)	Never Be the Same (2011)

Singles from When You Can Fly
- 1. "The Wheel" Released: March 2, 2009; 2. "When You Can Fly" Released: June 15, 2009; 3. "Kiss Me" Released: November 2, 2009; 4. "This Old Halo" Released: May 10, 2010; 5. "Don't Leave the Leavin'" Released: August 16, 2010

When You Can Fly is the second studio album by Canadian country music artist Victoria Banks and her first album with record label distribution, which earned Banks a 2010 Canadian Indie Award nomination and six nominations at the 2009 Canadian Country Music Awards including Album of the Year, Single of the Year ("The Wheel"), Songwriter of the Year ("The Wheel"), Female Artist of the Year and Rising Star. The album was self-produced by Banks, also earning her a nomination for Producer of the Year. It was released on April 14, 2009 by On Ramp Records/EMI Canada. The album's first single, "The Wheel", earned a 2010 Canadian Radio Music Award nomination. Subsequent singles included "When You Can Fly", "Kiss Me", "This Old Halo" and "Don't Leave the Leavin'". Music videos for "The Wheel" and "When You Can Fly" received airplay on CMT Canada.

== Track listing ==
When You Can Fly track listing
No.	Title	Length
1.	"The Wheel"	3:37
2.	"Long Gone Train"	3:51
3.	"Sacred"	3:45
4.	"When You Can Fly"	3:25
5.	"I Can't"	3:53
6.	"Don't Leave the Leavin'" (duet with Jason Blaine)	3:51
7.	"Kiss Me"	3:38
8.	"This Old Halo"	3:34
9.	"Back to the River"	3:44
10.	"The World Turns"	3:18
11.	"Some Men Don't Cheat"	3:46
