= Stephanie Quayle =

American singer-songwriter and musician (born 1979)

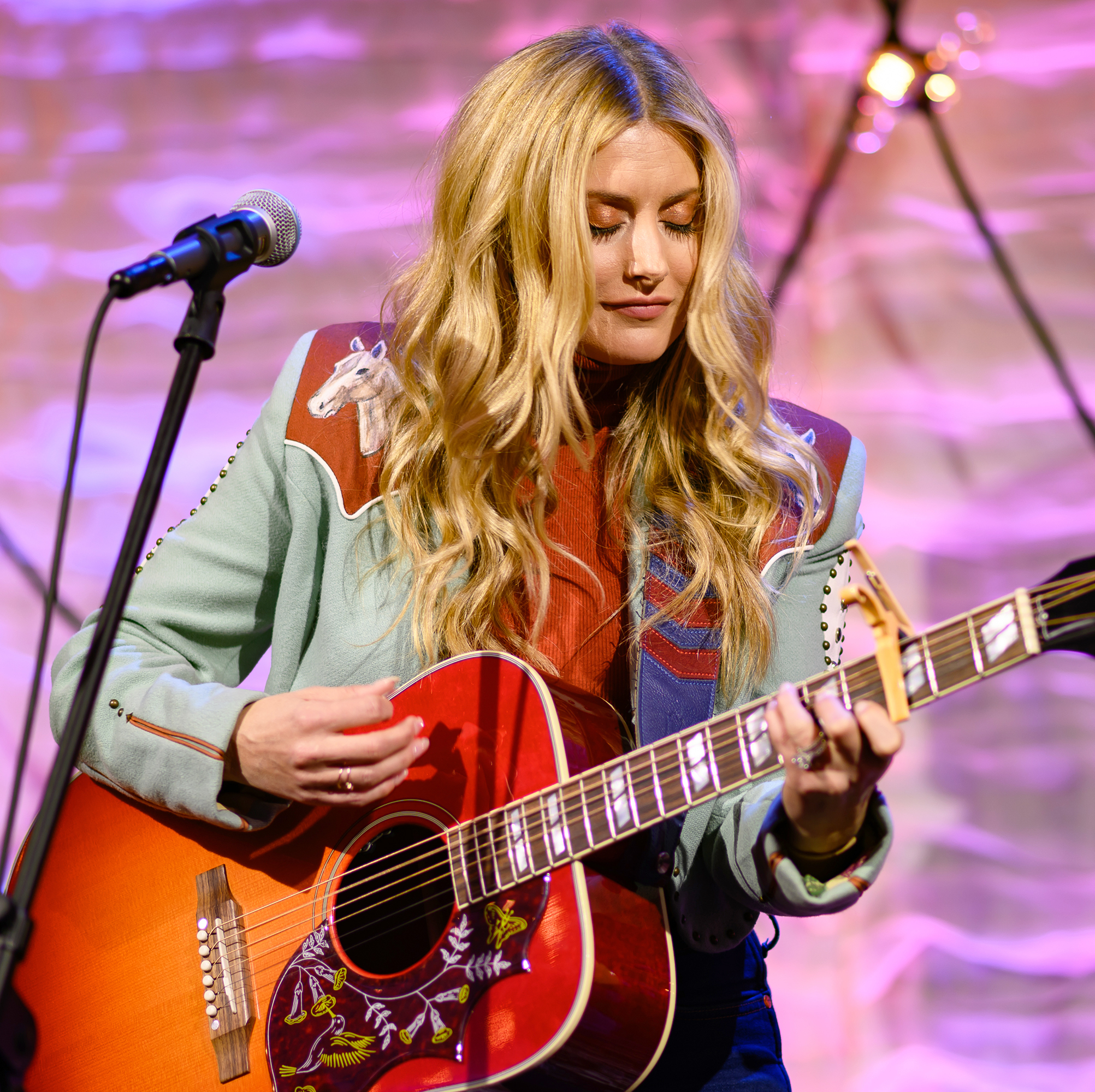

Background information
- Born: Stephanie Quayle; October 15, 1979 (age 46)
- Origin: Bozeman, Montana, U.S.
- Genres: Country; country pop
- Occupations: Singer; songwriter; musician
- Instruments: Vocals; guitar; piano
- Label: Rebel Engine Entertainment
- Website: stephaniequayle.com

Stephanie Quayle (born October 15, 1979) is an American singer-songwriter and musician.

== Early life ==
Stephanie Quayle grew up in Bozeman, Montana. She began playing piano at the age of 4, bought a guitar at 15, and the following year began singing in a band and found her calling on stage.

== Career ==
=== 2016–2018: Love the Way You See Me ===
In June 2016, Quayle released "Drinking with Dolly" via Rebel Engine Entertainment. It was written by Victoria Banks and Rachel Proctor. The music video topped the CMT Music 12 Pack while the single peaked in the Top 50 of the Billboard Indicator Chart. Quayle made her national television debut performing on Fox & Friends in December 2016.

In March 2017, her single "Winnebago," was released to radio, with the music video airing on GAC, CMT, and The Country Network. Winnebago teamed up as a partner on her tour, along with The RV Loft and KOA where Quayle traveled across the US from the Empire State Building to the Golden Gate, living out the lyrics of the song.

Rolling Stone named Quayle "Top 10 Artists To Watch" in May 2017 and she has shared the stage with artists including Chase Rice, Granger Smith, LoCash, Trace Adkins, and Gary Allan.

Rebel Engine Entertainment released her album Love The Way You See Me on September 1, 2017, with an exclusive "first" listen with People Country. The album's third single, "Selfish," was released in late 2017, and became her first single to chart on the Billboard Country Airplay chart when it debuted at number 60 for the week dated April 14, 2018.

Quayle was the only independent artist invited to perform for the five living former US presidents (Barack Obama, George W. Bush, Bill Clinton, George H.W. Bush, and Jimmy Carter) alongside artists like Lady Gaga and Alabama as part of the hurricane relief benefit concert, "Deep from the Heart: The One America Appeal" in Texas.

On April 7, 2018, Quayle made her Grand Ole Opry debut.

In November 2018, Quayle was inducted into CMT's 2019 Next Women of Country class.

=== 2019–present: If I Was a Cowboy ===
Quayle's highly anticipated EP If I Was a Cowboy was released on October 4, 2019. Rebel Engine Entertainment released the stripped-down version of the If I Was a Cowboy EP and "My Home's in Montana" in a video series, The Montana Sessions Presented by Wrangler, on February 14, 2020. She made her national daytime television debut performing "Whatcha Drinkin 'Bout" on The Kelly Clarkson Show.

Quayle was named in 2020 as the First Female Country Music Ambassador for Bass Pro Shops and Cabela's. She has teamed up with national brands Harley-Davidson, Kampgrounds Of America (KOA), Winnebago, Wrangler, Murdoch's Ranch & Home Supply, and Running Iron Whiskey. She is an active supporter of charitable organizations including the American Heart Association's Go Red For Women movement, Care Camps, Gibson Gives, and St. Jude Children's Research Hospital.

== Discography ==
=== Studio albums ===
Title	Album details	Peak chart positions		Sales
Title	Album details	US Heat	US Indie	Sales
Love the Way You See Me	Release date: September 1, 2017; Label: Rebel Engine Entertainment; Formats: CD, digital download	3	20	US: 4,200

=== Extended plays ===
- Ain't No Housewife (2009)
- Stand Back (2013)
- If I Was a Cowboy (2019)

=== Singles ===
Year	Single	Peak chart positions	Album
Year	Single	US Country Airplay	Album
2013	"Stand Back"	—	Stand Back
2014	"Sugar High"	—	
2016	"Drinking with Dolly"	—	Love the Way You See Me
2017	"Winnebago"	—	Love the Way You See Me
2017	"Selfish"	57	Love the Way You See Me
2019	"If I Was a Cowboy"	—	If I Was a Cowboy
2019	"Whatcha Drinkin 'Bout"	57	If I Was a Cowboy
2021	"By Heart"	—	TBD
"—" denotes a recording that did not chart.

=== Music videos ===
Year	Title	Director
2014	"Sugar High"	Will Holland and David Ogle
2016	"Drinking with Dolly"	Matthew DeLisi
2017	"Winnebago"	Jeff Johnson
2018	"Selfish"	Jeff Johnson
2018	"Ugly (Far From Ugly Edition)"	Jeff Johnson
2019	"If I Was a Cowboy"	Jeff Johnson
2019	"Whatcha Drinkin 'Bout"	Ford Fairchild
