= Happy Christmas (Jessica Simpson album) =

Studio album by Jessica Simpson
- Released: November 22, 2010
- Recorded: September – October 2010
- Studio: Henson (Los Angeles, CA); Triangle Sound (Atlanta, GA); AMP (Nashville, TN)
- Genre: Pop; Christmas; R&B
- Length: 47:01
- Label: Primary Wave; eleveneleven
- Producer: Kuk Harrell; Terius "The-Dream" Nash; Aaron Pearce; C. "Tricky" Stewart

Jessica Simpson chronology
Playlist: The Very Best of Jessica Simpson (2010)	Happy Christmas (2010)	Nashville Canyon, Part 1 (2025)

Singles from Happy Christmas
- 1. "My Only Wish" Released: November 11, 2010

Happy Christmas is the seventh studio album and second Christmas album by American singer Jessica Simpson. It released on November 22, 2010 by Primary Wave. Produced by Kuk Harrell, Aaron Pearce, C. "Tricky" Stewart and The-Dream, this was her first album released by Primary Wave and features cover versions of various Christmas standards in addition to original material.

== Background ==
After parting ways with Epic Records and signing a new deal, Simpson revealed during interviews with E! and PopSugar that a new Christmas album was being worked on. On September 15, 2010, it was announced that she was working with the producers of The-Dream and Tricky Stewart in her next two albums. On October 12, 2010, Simpson announced via Twitter that recording had been completed this album. She said that the concept of a new Christmas album came after PBS asked her if she would like to do a Christmas special. Simpson and PBS thought it would be a good idea to release an album along with a holiday special. The show premiered on television on December 4, 2010. The album was made available for streaming through Amazon.com. She also appeared on The Early Show, Late Night with Jimmy Fallon, Live with Regis and Kelly, Access Hollywood and performed at the Macy's Thanksgiving Day Parade and the Rockefeller Center Tree Lighting.

In an interview, Simpson said about that album: "This (album) is different because it's under my complete control, it's the first record that I'm putting out on eleveneleven Records which is my new record company. "I think it's great to have a spiritual record out there to be my first [on my new label] because that's how I got started in the business anyway".

Tricky Stewart told US Weekly about working with Simpson on the album: "I was so pleasantly surprised and happy with how everything came out! She is a gem just waiting to be rediscovered, so there is a definite possibility of us working together again in the future. She is fun and lighthearted but very serious about her singing. She is a little bit of an over-thinker sometimes because she puts so much pressure on herself. But, overall we had a great time making this record! We had to do it super fast — we started the negotiations and everything in October, which is really late for a Christmas album. But we got it done, it came out, and it's great — everyone loved it".

== Promotion ==
Simpson appeared at The Early Show, Late Show with David Letterman, Live with Regis and Kelly and at the Macy's Thanksgiving Day Parade to promote the album.

Simpson and PBS announced that a Christmas musical special would air in the fall of 2010. The special, entitled Jessica Simpson: Happy Christmas was available to watch on November 25, 2010 on Simpson's official website and premiered on Saturday prime-time television on December 4, 2010. The show features Simpson singing a collection of Christmas hits from Happy Christmas and her first holiday album Rejoyce: The Christmas Album (2004). Simpson was also joined by special guests including her sister Ashlee Simpson, Trey Lorenz, Willie Nelson and Carly Simon. This was the second Christmas TV special featuring Simpson, the first being Nick and Jessica's Family Christmas with her ex-husband Nick Lachey.

=== Singles ===
"My Only Wish" was released as a single. It premiered at On Air with Ryan Seacrest and the Simpson website jessicasimpson.com, the November 11, 2010. The song was written by Aaron Pearce, Jessica Simpson and Christopher Stewart. "My Only Wish" is a love song, a good rhythm Christmas, featuring pop music and traditional rhythms, drum notes, and hard knocks and grooves. Background vocals are present throughout the chorus. The song received mixed reviews by music critics and was compared to "All I Want for Christmas Is You" (1994) by Mariah Carey. The song managed to reach the Top 50 most downloaded Christmas songs of iTunes in the United States. During the first week of the release of the album, the song could be downloaded for free on iTunes Store. The single did not have a music video.

== Critical reception ==
Professional ratings
Review scores
Source	Rating
AllMusic	3/5 stars

The album received positive reviews. Stephen Thomas Erlewine of AllMusic stated, "compared to 2004's brassy Rejoyce: The Christmas Album, Happy Christmas exists on a small stage: Simpson doesn't belt songs out, doesn't seem intent on wowing an audience with her pizzazz. [sic] [...]She may be intent on being all things to all people, but her eagerness to please suits the season and helps make Happy Christmas a better holiday soundtrack than Rejoyce."

Jon Caramanica from The New York Times stated, "A Western-swing-influenced medley of "Here Comes Santa Claus" and "Santa Claus Is Coming to Town," sung by Jessica Simpson, and produced by Tricky Stewart and The-Dream? Someone's been paying attention to one critic's holiday wish list. Ms. Simpson, who began her career several lifetimes ago as a Christian singer, hasn't sounded as focused in years as she does on the feverishly pleasing "Happy Christmas," which is produced largely by Mr. Stewart and The-Dream, the synth-bliss R&B tastemakers, employing full restraint here. The bland bigness of holiday music suits Ms. Simpson's overpowering voice well, but even when she's testing it, she sounds sharp, whether on the multitracked delirium of "Carol of the Bells" or on an electric-blues version of "Merry Christmas Baby," where she energetically over-emotes against a more laconic holiday messenger, Willie Nelson"

== Commercial performance ==
The album debuted at number 123 on US Billboard 200, becoming Simpson's lowest peak in the United States. It also debuted at number nine on US Billboard Independent Albums and number twenty three on Top Holiday Albums chart. In its second week the album dropped to number 185 with sales of over 5,000.

The album has sold 28,000 copies in the United States as of 2016.

== Track listing ==
No.	Title	Writer(s)	Producer(s)	Length
1.	"My Only Wish"	Aaron Pearce; C. "Tricky" Stewart; Jessica Simpson	Pearce; Stewart; Kuk Harrell^{[a]}	3:53
2.	"Here Comes Santa Claus" / "Santa Claus Is Coming to Town"	J. Fred Coots; Haven Gillespie	Stewart; Terius "The-Dream" Nash; Pearce^{[b]}; Harrell^{[b]}	3:03
3.	"O Come O Come Emmanuel"	Pearce	Stewart; Nash; Pearce^{[b]}; Harrell^{[b]}	4:20
4.	"I'll Be Home for Christmas" (duet with John Britt)	Walter Kent; Kim Gannon; Buck Ram	Stewart; Nash; Pearce^{[b]}; Harrell^{[b]}	4:39
5.	"Happy Xmas (War Is Over)"	John Lennon; Yoko Ono	Stewart; Nash; Pearce^{[b]}; Harrell^{[b]}	3:43
6.	"Mary Did You Know"	Mark Lowry; Buddy Greene	Stewart; Nash; Pearce^{[b]}; Harrell^{[b]}	3:27
7.	"Merry Christmas Baby" (duet with Willie Nelson)	John Dudley "Johnny" Moore; Lou Baxter	Stewart; Nash; Pearce^{[b]}; Harrell^{[b]}	4:57
8.	"Kiss Me for Christmas"	Nash; Stewart; Simpson	Stewart; Nash; Pearce^{[b]}; Harrell^{[b]}	4:57
9.	"Have Yourself a Merry Little Christmas"	Hugh Martin; Ralph Blane	Stewart; Nash; Pearce^{[b]}; Harrell^{[b]}	4:04
10.	"Carol of the Bells"	Peter J. Wilhousky; Mykola Leontovych	Stewart; Nash; Pearce^{[b]}; Harrell^{[b]}	3:12
11.	"Jingle Bell Rock"	Joe Beal; Jim Boothe	Stewart; Nash; Pearce^{[b]}; Harrell^{[b]}	2:57
12.	"Silent Night"	Franz Xaver Gruber	Stewart; Nash; Pearce^{[b]}; Harrell^{[b]}	3:49
Total length:				47:01

Notes

- ^{^a} signifies a vocal producer
- ^{^b} signifies a co-producer

== Personnel ==
Credits for Happy Christmas adapted from AllMusic.

- Chris Bellman – mastering
- John Britt – duet vocals
- Cacee Cobb – A&R
- Martin Cooke – assistant vocal engineer
- Steven Dennis – assistant engineer
- Michelle Gayhart – copyist
- Josh Grabelle – art direction, design, layout
- Josh Gudwin – vocal engineer
- Christy Hall – production coordination
- Kuk Harrell – producer, vocal engineer, vocal producer
- Travis Harrington – assistant engineer
- Wayne Haun – orchestration, string arrangements
- Tom Hemby – guitar
- Jeremy Hunter – string arrangements, string engineer
- Terius "The-Dream" Nash – executive producer, producer
- Willie Nelson – duet
- Ken Oriole – mixing assistant
- Aaron Pearce – arranger, producer, programming, string arrangements, background vocals
- Anibal Rojas – tenor saxophone
- Norman Jean Roy – cover photo
- Jason Sherwood – assistant engineer
- Christopher " C. Tricky" Stewart – executive producer, producer
- Brian "B-Luv" Thomas – engineer
- Michael Thompson – guitar
- Andrew Wuepper – engineer, mixing

== Charts ==
Chart (2010)	Peak position
US Billboard 200	123
US Top Holiday Albums (Billboard)	23
US Independent Albums (Billboard)	9

== Release history ==
Region	Date	Label(s)	Ref.
Canada	November 22, 2010	EMI	
Germany	November 22, 2010	EMI	
United Kingdom	November 22, 2010	EMI	
United States	November 22, 2010	Primary Wave; eleveneleven	
