= I Can't (Lisa Brokop song) =

2024 song by Reba McEntire

Song by Lisa Brokop

from the album Beautiful Tragedy
- Released: August 19, 2008
- Genre: Country
- Length: 5:32
- Label: Ellbea Music
- Songwriters: Victoria Banks; Tania Hancheroff; Tia Sillers

"I Can't" is a song first recorded by Canadian country music singer Lisa Brokop for her 2008 album Beautiful Tragedy. It was written by Victoria Banks, Tania Hancheroff, and Tia Sillers. Banks performed her own version and included it on her album When You Can Fly, released on April 14, 2009. It was covered in 2024 by Reba McEntire.

== Reba McEntire version ==
"I Can't"

Single by Reba McEntire
- Released: May 8, 2024
- Genre: Country
- Length: 3:59
- Label: UMG Nashville; Rockin' R
- Songwriters: Victoria Banks; Tania Hancheroff; Tia Sillers
- Producer: Dave Cobb

Reba McEntire singles chronology
"Does He Love You (Revisited)" (2021)	"I Can't" (2024)

Music video
- "I Can't" on YouTube

American country music singer Reba McEntire covered "I Can't" and released it on May 8, 2024, as the lead single from her forthcoming thirty-third studio album. It was produced by Dave Cobb.

=== Background ===
McEntire first teased the release of "I Can't" during her appearance on The Jennifer Hudson Show on May 2, 2024, and announced that her first studio album in five years is coming "soon". She debuted the song with a live performance on May 7, 2024, on The Voice, where she served as a judge on the 25th season. She performed the song live again when she hosted the Academy of Country Music Awards for a record-breaking 17th time on May 16, 2024.

"I Can't" is described as "a driving, dramatic, soulful number that plays as part breakup song and part ode to survival" and has drawn comparisons to her song "I'm a Survivor".

=== Music video ===
The music video for "I Can't" premiered on July 26, 2024. Directed by Dano Cerny, the video takes place in a desert with backing dancers performing a choreographed routine as McEntire delivers the song through various weather elements.
