= Never Be the Same Again (disambiguation) =

"Never Be the Same Again" is a 2000 single by Melanie C, featuring Lisa Lopes.

Never Be the Same Again may also refer to:

- "Never Be the Same Again" (Ghostface Killah song), 2001
- "Never Be the Same Again", 2013 song by KT Tunstall as a bonus track on some versions of Invisible Empire // Crescent Moon

== See also ==
- "Never Gonna Be the Same Again", a song by Bob Dylan from the 1985 album Empire Burlesque
- Never Be the Same (disambiguation)
- Never Gonna Be the Same (disambiguation)
