= Never Gonna Be the Same =

Never Gonna Be the Same may refer to songs by:

- "Never Gonna Be the Same", by Mia Wray, 2021
- "Never Gonna Be the Same", by Courtney Love from the 2004 album America's Sweetheart
- "Never Gonna Be the Same", by Sean Paul from the 2005 album The Trinity

== See also ==
- Never Be the Same (disambiguation)
- Never Be the Same Again (disambiguation)
