= I Belong to Me =

Single by Jessica Simpson

from the album A Public Affair
- Released: September 26, 2006
- Recorded: March 2006
- Studio: Battery Studios (New York, NY)
- Genre: R&B
- Length: 3:40
- Label: Epic
- Songwriter: Diane Warren
- Producer: Stargate

Jessica Simpson singles chronology
"A Public Affair" (2006)	"I Belong to Me" (2006)	"Come on Over" (2008)

Music video
- "I Belong To Me" on Youtube.com

"I Belong to Me" is a song by American recording artist Jessica Simpson from her fifth studio album, A Public Affair. The song was written by Diane Warren and produced by Stargate. It was released on September 26, 2006 by Epic Records, as the second single from the album. Originally the song was not included in the standard version of the album, but was released in a version of Walmart as a bonus track. The lyrics of "I Belong to Me" is constructed in verse-chorus format and focuses on the dissatisfaction of love.

The song received mixed reviews from critics. In the United States, the single reached number 10 on the Bubbling Under Hot 100 and at number ninety-nine the Billboard Pop 100.

== Subject matter ==
When asked in an interview whether she had written songs that were reflective of her life, Diane Warren named "I Belong to Me", saying "that's one of the closer songs to me, because I feel that. I don't need someone to complete me. I complete myself. I don't believe that you need a person to complete you. That's my philosophy." Simpson said of the song, "It's a very powerful statement ... about owning yourself and controlling yourself. It's part of evolving, of growing up and becoming a woman."

== Critical reception ==
"I Belong to Me" received mixed reviews from music critics. According to Billboard magazine, the song has the same "self-empowerment theme" as Simpson's 2004 single "With You". Billboard wrote that "Simple R&B-lite production allows Simpson's lovely vocal to hold the reins, making for a song (written by the incomparable Diane Warren) that is a thematic bull's-eye for her female teen target [...] let's see if programmers make this release more of the public affair it deserves to be". Sal Cinquemani of Slant Magazine wrote, "I Belong To Me," an exclusive Walmart bonus track, will instead be the follow-up, a coup for the retail giant and a big fuck-you to competitors and unknowing fans who pick up the album anywhere else.

Rob Sheffield of Rolling Stone (magazine) gave the song two stars out of five going on to say, "Did Ashlee get all the talent? On Jessica's big post-divorce statement, she still sounds like a prissy kid, braying, "I complete myself" in "I Belong to Me," her answer to Nick Lachey's "What's Left of Me."

== Commercial release ==
Before the release of A Public Affair, the song was taken off the album's track listing—Simpson said that this was because she "was kind of afraid to sing the song"—and only the Wal-Mart edition of the album included the song as a bonus track. It was believed that the song had hit potential, and consequently Simpson's record label added it to subsequent versions of the album. During August 2006, Simpson's fans could listen on her official website to the songs "B.O.Y.", "I Belong to Me", "I Don't Want to Care", "If You Were Mine", "The Lover in Me" and "You Spin Me Round (Like a Record)", and vote for which song would become the second single. It was reported in early September that Simpson had chosen "I Belong to Me" as the second single.

In the United States, "I Belong to Me" was made available for airplay at mainstream contemporary hit radio stations on September 26. During the same period, the song debuted at number twenty-five on the Billboard Bubbling Under Hot 100 chart and at number ninety-nine on the Billboard Pop 100. It spent three non-consecutive weeks on each chart (until early November), peaking at number ten on the former and at number ninety on the latter. It failed to chart on the Billboard Hot 100.

== Music video ==
=== Background and concept ===
The music video for the song directed by Matthew Rolston was filmed in September 2006. It was given a "sneak peek" on MTV's Total Request Live in the U.S. on October 4, and was premiered in its entirety on October 11. On October 3, 2009 the video was released to the official VEVO channel Simpson, currently has over 4 million reproductions. Simpson said that the shoot was "a very emotional time" for her, and that she thought viewers of the video would "experience what I've been experiencing for the past year".

The video shows Simpson with platinum blonde hair. It begins with a close-up Jessica's face with focus clear images. Then she is lying on a bed, takes a piece of clothing and throws it to the ground. The room has boxes from moving, marked Bedroom. She walks around the room and looks out a window. She keeps walking and looks in a mirror, uses scissors and begins to jaggedly cut off her hair. She takes an eye pencil, and starts exaggeratedly drawing on eyeliner. After she places a crown on her head, she starts to cry. She goes back to the bathroom and cleans off the makeup.

== Credits and personnel ==
- Vocals: Jessica Simpson
- Songwriting: Diane Warren
- Production: Stargate

Credits adapted from A Public Affair liner notes.

== Charts ==
Chart (2006)	Peak position
US Billboard Bubbling Under Hot 100	10
US Pop 100 (Billboard)	90

== Release history ==
Release dates and formats for "I Belong to Me"
Region	Date	Format	Label(s)	Ref.
United States	September 26, 2006	Mainstream airplay	Epic	
