= I Can't (Friday Night Lights) =

- Friday Night Lights episode
- Episode no.: Season 4 Episode 10
- Directed by: Ami Canaan Mann
- Written by: Bridget Carpenter
- Cinematography by: Todd McMullen
- Editing by: Mark Conte
- Original release dates: January 20, 2010 (DirecTV); July 9, 2010 (NBC)
- Running time: 43 minutes

Guest appearances
- Steve Harris as Virgil Merriweather; Alicia Witt as Cheryl Sproles; Matt Barr as Ryan Lowry; Barry Tubb as Tom Cafferty; Madison Burge as Becky Sproles

Episode chronology
← Previous "The Lights in Carroll Park"	Next → "Injury List"
- Friday Night Lights (season 4)

"I Can't" is the tenth episode of the fourth season of the American sports drama television series Friday Night Lights, inspired by the 1990 nonfiction book by H. G. Bissinger. It is the 60th overall episode of the series and was written by co-executive producer Bridget Carpenter, and directed by Ami Canaan Mann. It originally aired on DirecTV's 101 Network on January 20, 2010, before airing on NBC on July 9, 2010.

The series is set in the fictional town of Dillon, a small, close-knit community in rural West Texas. It follows a high school football team, the Dillon Panthers. It features a set of characters, primarily connected to Coach Eric Taylor, his wife Tami, and their daughter Julie. In the episode, Becky and Luke debate over the pregnancy, while Vince finds that his mother has overdosed.

According to Nielsen Media Research, the episode was seen by an estimated 3.65 million household viewers and gained a 1.0/5 ratings share among adults aged 18–49. The episode received critical acclaim, with critics praising the episode's handling of abortion and drug addiction.

== Plot ==
Tim (Taylor Kitsch) delivers a stolen car to a scrapyard, but the owner tells him that he won't accept any more cars as he does not want to get involved in any possible theft. When Becky (Madison Burge) continues expressing fear over the pregnancy, Tim visits Tami (Connie Britton) for help. Becky states that she wants an abortion, and Tami agrees to help her.

Vince (Michael B. Jordan) comes home and finds his mother has fallen unconscious due to an overdose, prompting him to call an ambulance. At the hospital, Vince confronts his mother over her drug addiction, asking her if she really wants him to be all alone. Outside the room, he approaches a nurse to enroll his mother in rehab. Virgil (Steve Harris) starts spending more time with Vince to support him through his family crisis, although he is confronted by Jess (Jurnee Smollett), as she feels he is prioritizing Vince over his own family.

Becky comes clean to Cheryl (Alicia Witt) about her pregnancy, shocking her. They attend a clinic, where they get into an argument over Cheryl's pregnancy and her inner struggle with Becky herself. Luke (Matt Lauria) is also debating over the situation, asking his parents for help. Tim informs Billy (Derek Phillips) about the new problem with the cars. Billy resorts to having to dispose of the stolen cars in holes outside the city, with Tim forced to join him. When they get into an argument, Tim declares he is done with the business and asks Billy to also stop getting involved for the sake of his family.

Virgil finally visits one of his son's games, impressing Jess. Vince gets his mother into rehab, saying she can go through it. However, the rehabilitation's bills prove to be very expensive, so Vince is forced to go back to his gang. Luke calls Becky, telling her he will be there for her in anything. Becky then reveals that she already had the abortion. Luke claims he supports her, although he is still shaken by the news.

== Production ==
=== Development ===
The episode was written by co-executive producer Bridget Carpenter, and directed by Ami Canaan Mann. This was Carpenter's eighth writing credit, and Mann's first directing credit.

== Reception ==
=== Viewers ===
In its original American broadcast on NBC, "I Can't" was seen by an estimated 3.65 million household viewers with a 1.0/4 in the 18–49 demographics. This means that 1 percent of all households with televisions watched the episode, while 4 percent of all of those watching television at the time of the broadcast watched it. This was a 5% increase in viewership from the previous episode, which was watched by an estimated 3.46 million household viewers with a 1.1/5 in the 18–49 demographics.

=== Critical reviews ===
"I Can't" received critical acclaim. Eric Goldman of IGN gave the episode a "great" 8.8 out of 10 and wrote, "Friday Night Lights tackled a very tricky, and ever-controversial subject this week: abortion. But I think the series pulled it off with class, not politicizing the decision the characters made, but rather getting to the human emotions at the core of the situation – just as this series always does."

Keith Phipps of The A.V. Club gave the episode an "A–" grade and wrote, "She weighed the options and made the choice not to have a child, as more women do than generally gets depicted in films or on television. This episode showed the difficulty involved in that choice in its fullness." Ken Tucker of Entertainment Weekly wrote, "This week's Friday Night Lights gave us one of its finest hours ever. Abortion, addiction, and the way parents raise their children were central to this episode, entitled 'I Can’t.'"

Alan Sepinwall wrote, "We're not going to talk about whether we agree with her decision, but 'I Can't' effectively showed how she came to it, even as it showed her unsure even afterwards that it was the right one." Allison Waldman of TV Squad wrote, "There were some major developments in this episode of Friday Night Lights, especially among the younger set. And if you think life is just peachy keen for kids in high school, they aren't the ones attending East Dillon High. If you prefer the lighter, sweeter side of Friday Night Lights, this wasn't your night. Sadness was at every turn, none moreso that Becky and Vince and their very tough decisions."

Andy Greenwald of Vulture wrote, "'I Can't' was the second-strongest hour of the season thus far, trailing only 'The Son,' the epic, Saracen-farewell ep. The focus here was parenting in its various forms: the need we all have for a shoulder to cry on, an arm to lean on, a brain to pick, a hand to hold." Matt Richenthal of TV Fanatic gave the episode a 4.4 star rating out of 5 and wrote, "Granted, it's a delicate, controversial subject. But it's also legal and common and supported by approximately half the population. Therefore, I can't help but give credit to this week's episode of Friday Night Lights for actually going there. It takes a brave, confident, well-written series to do so." Television Without Pity gave the episode an "A" grade.

=== Accolades ===
Steve Harris submitted the episode for consideration for Outstanding Guest Actor in a Drama Series at the 62nd Primetime Emmy Awards.
