= Christie Lamb =

Australian country singer-songwriter

- Born: 1992; England
- Genres: Country
- Occupation: Singer-songwriter
- Instrument: Vocals
- Years active: 2011−present
- Labels: ABC Music
- Website: www.christielamb.com

Christie Lamb (born 1992) is an English-born, Australian country singer-songwriter. Lamb has released five studio albums.

== Early life ==
Lamb was born in England and moved to Australia at 6 years of age. She found her love for the stage through dance lessons and began playing flute at primary school, before commencing piano and vocal lessons at age of ten. At 14, Christie took up guitar and began song-writing.

Following high school, she studied a Bachelor of Music at university and travelled to Nashville, Tennessee.

== Career ==
Lamb released her debut EP in 2011, featuring her debut single "Mr. Wrong", which reached number 4 on the Country Tracks Top 30. The EP was produced by Rod McCormack and features tracks co-written by Lamb, McCormack and fellow songwriters Jay Collie, Jasper Somerville-Collie and Gina Jeffreys.

In February 2014, Lamb released of her debut album, All She Wrote. Lamb undertook two writing trips to Nashville as groundwork for the album. In 2015, Lamb was awarded the fan voted CMC Award for New Oz Artist of the Year.

Late in 2016, Lamb signed with ABC Music. Lamb released her second studio album Loaded in February 2017. The album was proceeded by single "Flamethrower" and launched at the Rooty Hill RSL in New South Wales.

In 2019, Lamb released her third studio album, Broken Lines. The album was produced by Andy Mack. About the album, Lamb said "Andy was very inclusive and wanted not just my opinion but the opinions of the other musicians in the room. We recorded it all organically, all in the same room. Then we'd play back the take and say, 'What could we change? You could add a drum fill here. I might try this different bass line here.' It was very much a group effort, this album." Broken Lines peaked at number 15 on the ARIA Charts.

Lamb released her fourth studio album Truth on 30 September 2022. The album was produced by Stuart Stuart and was recorded remotely. Lamb said “When writing the songs for this album, I wanted to challenge myself whilst being entirely true to myself. I wanted to go deeper and more personal than I’ve ever gone before. This album is definitely about me growing as a person and an artist. I have written the songs on this album from life experiences, my heart and my truth."

== Personal life ==
Lamb met Jonathan English (son of Jon English) in 2012 when Lamb during which time Lamb was lead female vocalist Jon English's Rock Revolution National Tour. The couple were married in Gledswood Homestead in Sydney in June 2021. On 20 August 2022 Lamb gave birth their first child called Charlotte Rose English.

== Discography ==
=== Studio albums ===
List of studio albums, with selected chart positions
Title	Details	Peak chart positions
Title	Details	AUS
All She Wrote	Released: 28 February 2014; Label: FX Productions, WJO; Format: CD, digital	—
Loaded	Released: 24 February 2017; Label: ABC Music (5733649); Format: CD, digital	22
Broken Lines	Released: 18 October 2019; Label: ABC Music (7751393); Format: CD, digital	15
Truth	Released: 30 September 2022; Label: ABC Music (ABCC0020); Format: CD, digital	24
Dare	Released: 8 August 2025; Label: MGM (CL001CD); Format: CD, digital	76

=== Extended plays ===
List of EPs
Title	Details
Christie Lamb	Released: 2011; Label: ABC Music; Format: digital

== Awards and nominations ==
=== Country Music Awards (CMAA) ===
The Country Music Awards of Australia (CMAA) (also known as the Golden Guitar Awards) is an annual awards night held in January during the Tamworth Country Music Festival, celebrating recording excellence in the Australian country music industry. They have been held annually since 1973.

Year	Nominee / work	Award	Result (wins only)	Ref.
2016	Christie Lamb - Broken Record	New Talent of the Year	Won	

=== CMC Awards ===
The CMC Awards are awarded annually by Country Music Channel Australia.

Year	Nominee / work	Award	Result (wins only)	Ref.
2015	Christie Lamb	New Australian Artist of the Year	Won	
2018	Christie Lamb	Australian Artist of the Year (female)	Won	
