= Victoria Banks =

Canadian singer and songwriter

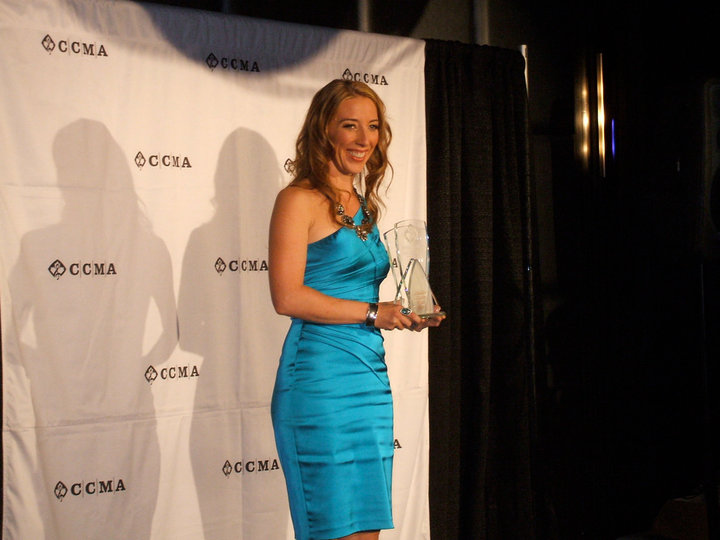
- Victoria Banks at the 2010 CCMA Awards

Background information
- Born: Victoria Wenonah Banks; February 8, 1973 (age 53)
- Origin: Muskoka, Ontario, Canada
- Genres: Country
- Occupations: Singer, songwriter
- Instruments: singing, acoustic guitar, piano
- Years active: 1998-present
- Label: On Ramp
- Website: victoriabanks.net Victoria Banks discography at MusicBrainz

Victoria Wenonah Banks (born February 8, 1973) is a Nashville-based Canadian singer and songwriter who has penned songs for a variety of artists including Reba McEntire, Sara Evans, Jessica Simpson, Lauren Alaina, Carly Pearce and Mickey Guyton. Her songs have earned 2 ASCAP Country Music Awards, a SOCAN International Achievement Award, a Covenant Award, and a Grammy nomination (for co-writing Mickey Guyton's album Remember Her Name).

Banks' own self-produced debut album When You Can Fly, released on the On Ramp/EMI Canada label in April 2009, earned her a 2010 Canadian Indie Award nomination and six nominations at the 2009 Canadian Country Music Awards (CCMAs) including Album of the Year, Producer of the Year, Single of the Year ("The Wheel"), Songwriter of the Year ("The Wheel"), Female Artist of the Year and Rising Star, making Banks the most nominated female artist of 2009. "The Wheel," the album's first single, reached the Top 20 on the Radio & Records Country Singles chart earning her a 2010 Canadian Radio Music Award nomination. Music videos for "The Wheel" and "When You Can Fly" received airplay on CMT Canada. Banks was named both Female Artist of the Year and Songwriter(s)Of The Year at the 2010 CCMA Awards, and was nominated in the Female Artist of the Year category again in 2011.

In 2020 Banks became a podcast host with "The Table Women", a series that focuses on women in the entertainment industry. In the fall of 2021, she joined the faculty of Belmont University's Mike Curb College of Entertainment and Music Business as an instructor of songwriting.

== Music career ==
Banks and Canadian country artist Deric Ruttan both went to high school in Bracebridge, Ontario where they performed in a band together. She went on to complete a degree in Zoology/Anthropology at the University of Toronto before moving to Nashville, Tennessee in 1998, where she signed her first publishing deal. From 1998 to 2002 she was a staff songwriter for Fame Music (aka House of Fame), from 2002 to 2007 she was a writer for Full Circle Music (Circle C Songs), from 2008 to 2010 she wrote for Nashville's Sony/ATV Publishing, from 2011 to 2013 for Chrysalis Music (subsequently BMG Chrysalis), and from 2013 to 2019 for Nashville's RareSpark Media Group.

As a staff songwriter in the country music market, Banks has had songs featured in movies and TV and recorded by a variety of country artists including Jessica Simpson, Sara Evans, Carly Pearce, Cassadee Pope, Mickey Guyton, One More Girl, Johnny Reid, and Doc Walker. She has won International Unisong and USA Songwriting Competitions in 2006 and 2007, played acoustic guitar for Pam Tillis, Crystal Shawanda and Rachel Proctor, shared the performing stage with Julie Roberts, Jamie O'Neal, Alabama and Billy Currington, and has toured as an opener for Reba McEntire, Wynonna Judd, Randy Travis, and Lonestar. She co-wrote the top Canadian country singles of 2009: Johnny Reid's "Dance With Me" and One More Girl's "When it Ain't Raining". Her Jessica Simpson hit "Come on Over" was the highest debuting first single for a new country artist in the Billboard chart history and earned a 2009 ASCAP Country Music Award, and her solo-written Sara Evans hit "Saints & Angels" earned her a 2003 ASCAP Country Music Award and a SOCAN International Achievement Award.

In May 2010, after completing a tour in Canada, Banks penned the song City Of Dreams while traveling back home to the devastating and historic Nashville flood. Her song came to life in a video, when two weeks later, over 40 Nashville artists and musicians, from legendary voices to new faces, joined forces with a production/engineering team and film crew to record it as a flood relief song. This single was released as a digitally download. All participants and facilities donated their services and all proceeds from the song and music video City Of Dream-Artists for Tennessee Flood Relief will benefit the American Red Cross. The Nashville Ballet subsequently choreographed "City of Dreams" along with several of Victoria's songs and performed them alongside her as part of their 2016 Attitude program at the Tennessee Performing Arts Center.

Victoria has had songwriting success in Australia in 2019 with multi-week #1 "Flamethrower" recorded by Christie Lamb, and again in 2019 with two #1 singles released back-to-back by Amber Lawrence ("Heart" and "Hell to Hallelujah").

Banks presented "That's a Country Song" to the country duo Florida Georgia Line on NBC's Songland on May 18, 2020, to an enthusiastic reception from panelist songwriter Shane McAnally, who called her "the real deal".

In February 2020, Capitol Records Nashville artist Mickey Guyton debuted the single "What Are You Gonna Tell Her?" (co-written by Guyton and Banks with Emma-Lee and producer Karen Kosowski) to a standing ovation of country radio programmers during the Universal Music Group Country Radio Seminar event at Nashville's Ryman Auditorium. In September 2020, Guyton performed the song on the Academy of Country Music Awards with Keith Urban accompanying on piano, making history as the first Black woman to perform an original song on the awards show. A special display about the song - including text messages from Banks' phone on the day of the song's conception - was featured in a 2021 exhibit in Nashville's Country Music Hall of Fame.

Guyton's subsequent EP, "Bridges", included 3 songs co-written by Banks. Guyton followed up with a 2021 ACM Awards performance of the Banks co-written "Hold On", backed up by the Belmont University choir. Guyton's 2021 release of the full-length album "Remember Her Name" includes 4 songs co-written by Banks, and earned a Best Country Album nomination at the 2022 Grammy Awards. Guyton released another single co-penned with Banks, "Scary Love", in 2024.

Victoria's "Uncovered" album, a COVID lockdown project for which she wrote, engineered, produced, and played all instruments on every track (except for a guest appearance by fiddle player Larry Franklin), was released independently in May 2020. It includes 9 songs, 8 of which have previously been recorded by other artists.

Banks co-write Reba McEntire's 2024 single "I Can't", which McEntire debuted with live performances on ABC's The Voice and the 2024 ACM Awards.

== Discography ==
=== Studio albums ===
Title	Details
You Don't Know Me	Release date: January 11, 2006; Label: self-released
When You Can Fly	Release date: April 14, 2009; Label: On Ramp Records
Never Be the Same	Release date: April 26, 2011; Label: On Ramp Records
Indigo	Release date: October 7, 2014; Label: Fontana North
Uncovered	Release date: May 18, 2020; Label: self-released

=== Singles ===
Year	Single	Peak positions	Album
Year	Single	CAN Country	Album
2009	"The Wheel"	16	When You Can Fly
2009	"When You Can Fly"	28	When You Can Fly
2009	"Kiss Me"	31	When You Can Fly
2010	"This Old Halo"	—	When You Can Fly
2010	"Don't Leave the Leavin'" (with Jason Blaine)	—	When You Can Fly
2011	"Come On"	21	Never Be the Same
2011	"I'm Gone"	50	Never Be the Same
2011	"Never Be the Same"	—	Never Be the Same
2012	"Jackson"	—	Never Be the Same
2012	"Barefoot Girl"	—	Never Be the Same
2014	"Ruined"	—	Indigo
2016	"Hello Heart"	—	Indigo
2020	"Want"	—	Uncovered
"—" denotes releases that did not chart

==== Guest singles ====
Year	Single	Artist
2010	"City of Dreams"	Artists for Tennessee Flood Relief

=== Music videos ===
Year	Video	Director
2009	"The Wheel"	
2009	"When You Can Fly"	Warren P. Sonoda
2010	"City of Dreams"	Julian Chojnacki
2011	"I'm Gone"	Troy Niemans
2016	"Hello Heart"	

== Singles written by Banks ==
Year	Title	Artist(s)
2000	"Arizona Rain"	3 of Hearts
2001	"Saints & Angels"	Sara Evans
2008	"Come On Over"	Jessica Simpson
2008	"Remember That"	Jessica Simpson
2009	"Tomboy"	Krista Marie
2009	"It's a Girl Thing"	Jesse Lee
2009	"Dance With Me"	Johnny Reid
2009	"When It Ain't Raining"	One More Girl
2010	"Mine All Mine"	The Wilsons
2010	"Searchin' for You"	Hey Romeo
2010	"I'm Gonna Make You Love Me"	Doc Walker
2012	"Wrecking Ball"	Terri Clark
2015	"Why Baby Why"	Mickey Guyton
2015	"Faint of Heart"	Sister C
2015	"Underneath"	Maia Sharp
2016	"Flamethrower"	Christie Lamb
2017	"Drinking with Dolly"	Stephanie Quayle
2017	"Winnebago"	Stephanie Quayle
2019	"Can't Help Myself"	Dan Davidson
2019	"Heart"	Amber Lawrence
2019	"Hell to Hallelujah"	Amber Lawrence
2019	"Sister"	Mickey Guyton
2019	"Carry You With Me"	Christie Lamb
2020	"What Are You Gonna Tell Her?"	Mickey Guyton
2021	"All American"	Mickey Guyton
2022	"Three Chords and a Woman's Truth"	Christie Lamb
2022	"Beat of My Own Drum"	Christie Lamb
2023	"Secondhand You"	Jess Moskaluke
2023	"Counting Down Christmas"	Jess Moskaluke
2024	"Scary Love"	Mickey Guyton
2024	"I Can't"	Reba McEntire

== Awards and nominations ==
In 2003, Banks was the recipient of an International Achievement Award for the song "Saints and Angels" at the SOCAN Awards in Toronto. In 2009 Victoria was the most nominated female artist in Canadian Country music at the Canadian Country Music Association awards. She was also nominated for a 2009 Canadian Radio Music Award for Country Song of the Year for her breakout single The Wheel and nominated for a 2009 Indie Award for Independent Country Artist of the Year. On September 11, 2010, in Edmonton, Alberta at the Canadian Country Music Association Gala Dinner it was announced that Banks was one of the recipients of the Songwriter(s) Of The Year for the song Dance With Me (written by Victoria Banks/Johnny Reid/Tia Sillers; recorded by Johnny Reid). The following day Sunday September 12, 2010 at Edmonton's Rexall Place, she was presented with the Female Artist of the Year award, broadcast on CBC Television and CMT Canada. Banks earned a second ASCAP Country Music Award in 2009 for writing Jessica Simpson's "Come on Over", won a Covenant Award from the Canadian Gospel Music Association in 2014 for the Canada's Double Portion recording of "What I've Learned So Far", and was part of the writing team behind 4 tracks on Mickey Guyton's Grammy-nominated Country Album of the Year contender "Remember Her Name" in 2022.

Year	Award	Category	Result
2003	American Society of Composers, Authors & Publishers (ASCAP) Awards	Country Music Award for "Saints & Angels" (recorded by Sara Evans)	Won
2003	Society of Composers, Authors & Music Publishers of Canada (SOCAN) Awards	International Achievement Award for "Saints & Angels" (recorded by Sara Evans)	Won
2009	Canadian Country Music Association Awards	Female Artist of the Year	Nominated
2009	Canadian Country Music Association Awards	Single of the Year for "The Wheel"	Nominated
2009	Canadian Country Music Association Awards	Album of the Year for "When You Can Fly"	Nominated
2009	Canadian Country Music Association Awards	Rising Star of the Year	Nominated
2009	Canadian Country Music Association Awards	Songwriter of the Year for "The Wheel" (written by Victoria Banks / Tia Sillers; recorded by Victoria Banks)	Nominated
2009	Canadian Country Music Association Industry Awards	Record Producer(s) of the Year; Victoria Banks, Producer - When You Can Fly (Victoria Banks)	Nominated
2009	Canadian Country Music Association Industry Awards	Website of the Year victoriabanks.net (Victoria Banks) - Creative Juices, Webmaster	Nominated
2009	Canadian Radio Music Awards	Country Song of the Year for "The Wheel"	Nominated
2009	Canadian Indie Awards	Independent Country Artist of the Year	Nominated
2009	American Society of Composers, Authors & Publishers	Country Music Award for "Come on Over" (recorded by Jessica Simpson)	Won
2010	Canadian Country Music Association Awards	Female Artist of the Year	Won
2010	Canadian Country Music Association Awards	Songwriter(s) Of The Year for the song "Dance With Me" (written by Victoria Banks/Johnny Reid/Tia Sillers; recorded by Johnny Reid)	Won
2011	Canadian Country Music Association Awards	Female Artist of the Year	Nominated
2012	Canadian Country Music Association Awards	Female Artist of the Year	Nominated
2012	Juno Awards	Country Album of the Year (for the album "Roots And Wings" recorded by Terri Clark)	Won
2014	Gospel Music Association of Canada Awards	Covenant Award for the song "What I've Learned So Far" (recorded by Canada's Double Portion)	Won
2022	Grammy Awards	Best Country Album (for the album "Remember Her Name" recorded by Mickey Guyton)	Nominated
