= A Public Affair =

Studio album by Jessica Simpson
- Released: August 26, 2006
- Recorded: Early 2005 – July 14, 2006
- Studios: Conway (Hollywood, CA); Henson (Hollywood, CA); Westlake (Hollywood, CA); The Pool House (Long Island, NY); Skyline (New York, NY); Bliss Recordings (Hollywood, CA); Sony Music (New York, NY); Homesite 13 (Novato, CA); Mayfair (London, England); Flyte Tyme (Santa Monica, CA); The Village (Los Angeles, CA); Battery (New York, NY); The Hit Factory Criteria (Miami, FL)
- Genres: Pop; R&B
- Length: 54:18
- Label: Epic
- Producers: Lester Mendez; Jimmy Jam & Terry Lewis; Cory Rooney; Dan Shea; Scott Storch; Stargate; Sam Watters; Louis Biancaniello; Greg Kurstin

Jessica Simpson chronology
ReJoyce: The Christmas Album (2004)	A Public Affair (2006)	Do You Know (2008)

Singles from A Public Affair
- 1. "A Public Affair" Released: June 29, 2006; 2. "I Belong to Me" Released: September 26, 2006

A Public Affair is the fifth studio album by American pop singer Jessica Simpson. The album was released on August 26, 2006 in the United States by Epic Records. The album is Simpson's first studio album following her divorce from Nick Lachey and her first release under Epic Records, following her departure from Columbia Records.

The album was produced by Jimmy Jam & Terry Lewis, Cory Rooney, Scott Storch, Stargate and Lester Mendez. Simpson co-wrote nine of the thirteen songs on the album. It received generally mixed reviews from music critics, who complimented its musical diversity from Simpson's previous albums, while criticizing its individuality.

Two singles were released from A Public Affair. The lead single and title track, "A Public Affair", became Simpson's sixth top-twenty single in the United States and her third song to reach number fourteen, after "With You" (2003) and "These Boots Are Made for Walkin'" (2005). The song also saw success in the United Kingdom, reaching the top ten in Scotland and Ireland while charting at number twenty on the UK Singles Chart. The second and final single, "I Belong to Me", failed to achieve the success of "A Public Affair", only peaking at number ten on the US Bubbling Under Hot 100.

The album debuted at number five on the US Billboard 200 with first-week sales of 101,000 copies and was certified Gold by the RIAA. It peaked at number six in Canada, where it was also certified Gold. Worldwide, the album generally underperformed, peaking in the top 40 in Australia and Ireland. A Public Affair has sold 500,000 units in the United States and over one million copies worldwide to date.

== Background ==
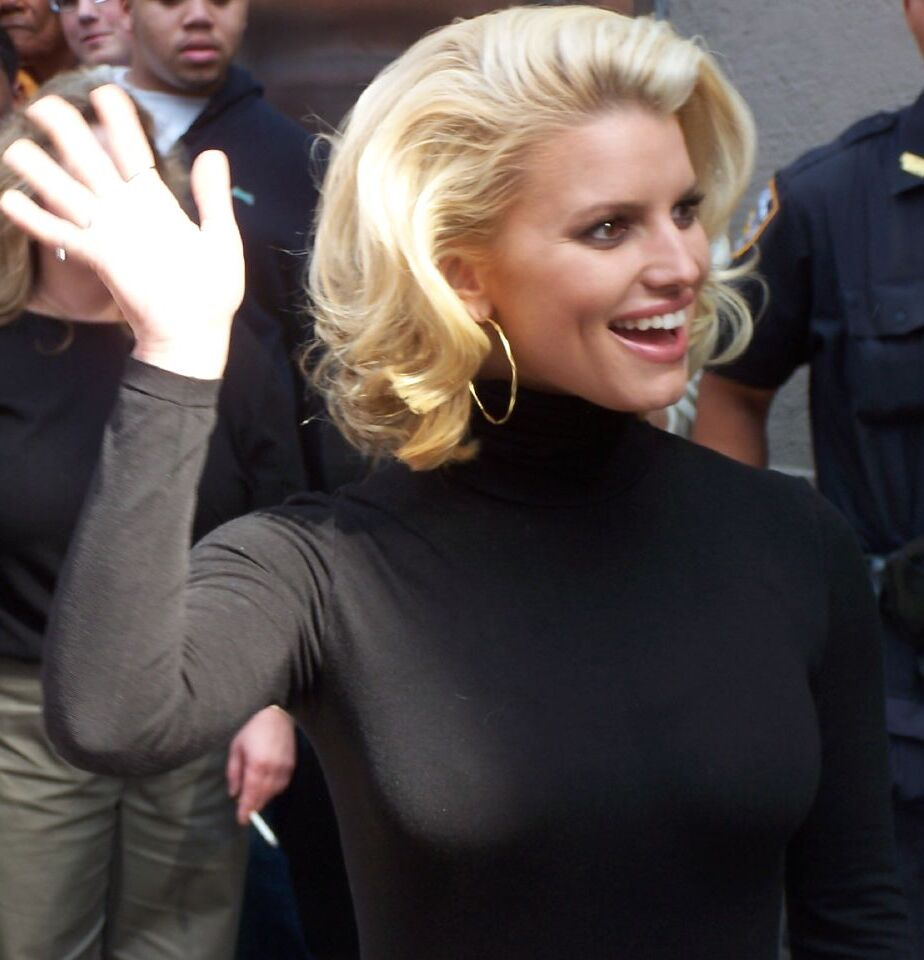
Simpson in August 2006

Following the release of her fourth studio album ReJoyce: The Christmas Album (2004), Simpson began working on the album in late 2004, saying that she was listening to Björk for inspiration. Simpson first announced the album on July 29, 2005 in an interview with MTV. The album was initially reported to be titled And the Band Played On, with a release set for November 2005. Simpson said that the record would be her first that she would executive produce. In October 2005, it was reported that the album had been delayed to spring of the following year. On March 28, 2006, Simpson announced that she had signed a new record agreement with Epic Records and would be departing from Columbia Records after having been with the label for seven years. In April 2006, a rep for Simpson confirmed that the album had been delayed again, but was to be released by the end of the year. It was reportedly delayed due to her divorce from Nick Lachey, as the pair announced their split in November 2005. Simpson continued to work on recording music following their split, and wanted her perspective to reflect in the album, saying: "When you persevere through so much, when you go through so much, you want to show that in your music". Simpson found it difficult to write songs specifically about Lachey, however, and decided to write a "fun" album instead.

Simpson worked with Janet Jackson's extensive producers Jimmy Jam and Terry Lewis on several songs on A Public Affair. The duo had previously produced Simpson's country-pop cover version of "These Boots Are Made for Walkin'" for the soundtrack to The Dukes of Hazzard; the song was a hit single in 2005, reaching the top 15 in the United States while charting in the top five in Australia and the United Kingdom. The song was included as a bonus track on international releases of the album.

Simpson noted Jackson as an influence on the album, who at the time was also recording at the same studio as Simpson. Simpson said that she took "a Janet Jackson approach" with the ballads on the album, and singled out "Back to You" as a track that reminded her of works by Jackson. Slant Magazine's Sal Cinquemani regarded Simpson's work with Jimmy Jam and Terry Lewis as unexpected, saying their contributions are "surprisingly, country-inspired." Simpson said that the duo wanted to focus on country influences, but described the influence as inconspicuous and "like an accent". Producer Scott Storch worked on producing two songs for the album. The first track, "Fired Up", was reportedly being considered as the album's first single. The second track that Simpson worked on with Storch was titled "Mr. Operator", but the track was ultimately not included on the album.

In July 2006, the artwork for A Public Affair surfaced. The initial cover art for the album showed a "sultry" image of Simpson wearing a strapless dress with her hair down. However, this cover was ultimately switched to a more "casual" image of Simpson wearing a green T-shirt, wearing a ring on her right index finger, and with her hair pulled back. Simpson's representative Rob Shuter explained to TMZ that the original cover was provided to the record label because the final decision on the album's artwork had not yet been made at that time.

== Music ==
Simpson described A Public Affair as "a fun album, an eighties radio throwback that was an ode to freedom" and an album that she "genuinely loved". The album opens with the lead single, "A Public Affair", which was compared to Madonna's "Holiday". The next song, "You Spin Me Round (Like a Record)" interpolates the chorus from Dead or Alive's 1984 song of the same name. Simpson compared the song to "Waiting for Tonight" by Jennifer Lopez, while MTV compared the song to Rihanna's "SOS", the latter of which samples Soft Cell's "Tainted Love". Simpson and producer Cory Rooney wrote the song's verse lyrics, but were uncredited on the release. The fourth song, "If You Were Mine" was compared to Janet Jackson's "If" and "When I Think of You". "Walkin' 'Round in a Circle" samples "Dreams" by Fleetwood Mac. Simpson said that the "familiar tight rhythm allowed [her] to be a little loser" when structuring the song. She explained: "I wrote about the patterns I fell into, and how fear often keeps me stuck in a circle, where I can't tell the beginning from the end". "Push Your Tush", a song with country influences, heavily samples the Ohio Players 1976 song, "Who'd She Coo?". The ninth track, "Back to You", is about Simpson's first boyfriend in high school, which was inspired by her old journal entries.

The penultimate track, "Fired Up", was inspired by a quote from one of Simpson's close friends. Producer Scott Storch compared the track to "Dirrty", the 2002 single by Christina Aguilera. "Let Him Fly" is a cover of the song originally recorded by Patty Griffin. Some music critics believed the cover was in reference to Simpson's divorce from Nick Lachey. Simpson's sister, Ashlee Simpson, had introduced her to the song in late 2005.

"We laid there listening to the song and just cried and cried like babies," Jessica recalled. "In a lot of ways, my sister really gave me the strength to pull through this really hard time. And it was just lying there and being with her that got me through it. I knew everything would be OK. The song is about how sometimes you just have to know when to let something go. And that was that moment. And I had to sing it."

Simpson later said "not a single song" on the album was about Lachey, and that the cover was not directed at him. While filming her role in The Dukes of Hazzard (2005), she had developed feelings for her co-star Johnny Knoxville, and she said that her recording of the song was her way of assuring herself that she needed to let go of these feelings. The bonus track and second single "I Belong to Me" was written by Diane Warren, who had previously written Simpson's 2003 single "Sweetest Sin". Warren described the song as "one of the closer songs to me, because I feel that. I don't need someone to complete me. I complete myself."

== Promotion ==
=== Live performances ===
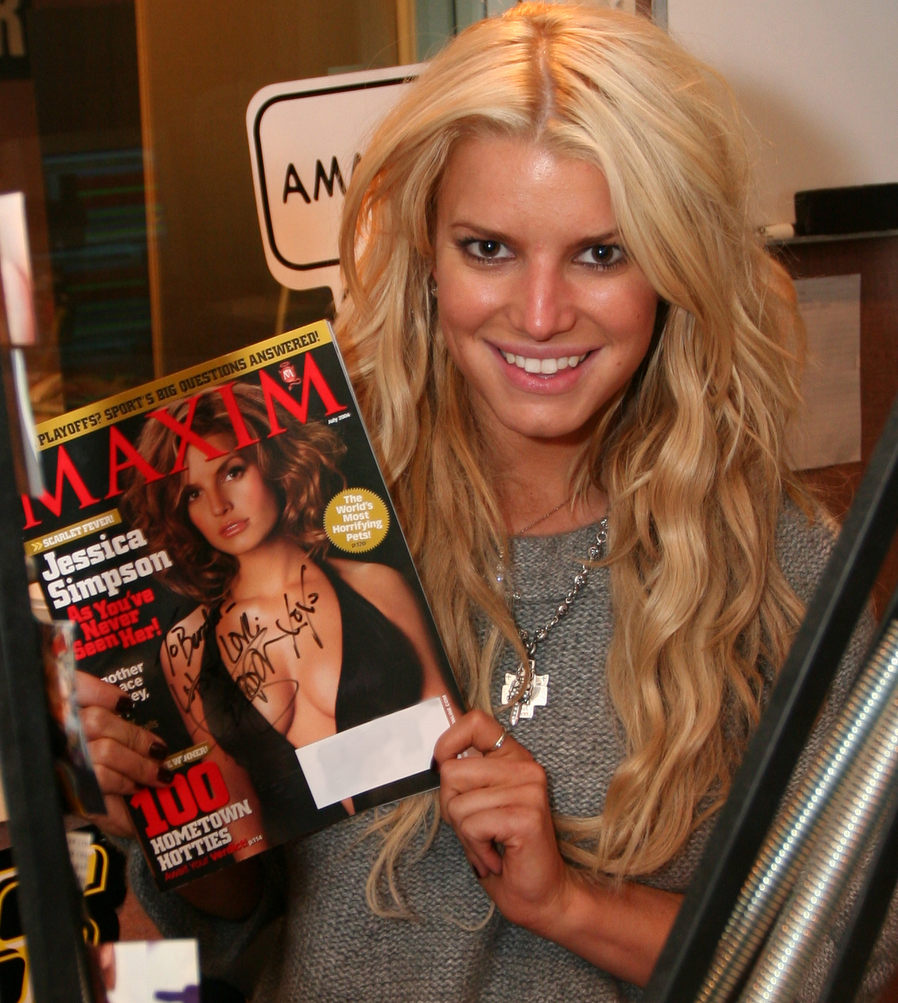
Simpson holding a signed Maxim copy featuring her on the cover in August 2006

Following the album's release, Simpson embarked on a promotional tour and appeared on several television shows to publicize A Public Affair. However, Simpson suffered from a broken blood vessel in her throat prior to several scheduled live performances. She was scheduled to perform on the Late Show With David Letterman on August 29, 2006, but canceled the appearance. The following day, she made an appearance on MTV's Total Request Live where she did not perform but introduced music videos. The same day, Yahoo! held a release party for the album at The Roxy in New York City, where Simpson told reporters "My voice is completely gone. The album is all part of who I am right now. I wish I could sing it for them right now, but there's no way."

Her condition improved by the following morning, when she appeared on NBC's Today show, performing "I Belong to Me" and "With You". After her voice cracked during a high note in the latter song, she paused and said, "All right, I tried that one," before finishing the performance. She explained: "I couldn’t even count on my voice, but [my fans] got me through. 'I’m sorry,' I told them over and over again. I was apologizing about my voice, but so much more. I was so sorry that I had let them down." On September 4, 2006, MTV aired the television special Jessica Simpson: A Public Affair, which included performances of "I Belong to Me", "Let Him Fly", "You Spin Me Round (Like a Record)", and "A Public Affair". The following day, Simpson appeared on The View, performing "Let Him Fly" and "I Belong to Me". On September 6, 2006, Simpson performed "A Public Affair" and "Fired Up" on The Early Show.

=== Singles ===
"A Public Affair" was released as the album's lead single on 29 June 2006. The song was favorably likened to Janet Jackson for its "breathy vocals" and "sweet melody". The music video features appearances by Christina Applegate, Christina Milian, Eva Longoria, Maria Menounos, Andy Dick and Ryan Seacrest. In the United States, the single debuted at number 39 on the Billboard Hot 100, on the issue dated July 15, 2006. On August 12, 2006, it peaked at number 14 on the chart. The single became Simpson's sixth top 20 single in the US and her third song to reach number, 14 tied with "With You" (2004) and "These Boots Are Made for Walkin'" (2005). The single was certified Gold by the RIAA for selling 500,000 copies on July 20, 2007.

On August 9, 2006, Simpson announced on her official website that she wanted her fans to choose the second single from A Public Affair. She provided six choices alongside samples of each song: "If You Were Mine", "The Lover in Me", "B.O.Y.", "I Don't Want to Care", "You Spin Me Round (Like a Record)" and "I Belong to Me". "I Belong to Me" was released as the album's second and final single on September 26, 2006. The song was initially only included on the Walmart release of A Public Affair as a bonus track, a decision which Sal Cinquemani of Slant called "a coup for the retail giant and a big fuck-you to competitors and unknowing fans who pick up the album anywhere else." The song was amended to future releases of the album, and those who had already purchased the album were offered the track as a free download. The single peaked at number ten on the Billboard Bubbling Under Hot 100 chart.

Prior to the release of A Public Affair, Simpson expressed that she wanted "You Spin Me Round (Like a Record)" chosen as its second single, but her management was concerned that it was "too much of a club track". Despite not being released as a single, the song peaked at number 95 on the Billboard Pop 100 chart and at 21 on the Billboard Bubbling Under Hot 100 chart on the issue dated September 23, 2006. Following the release of A Public Affair, Simpson worked with singer and then-boyfriend John Mayer on a reworking of "Walkin' Round in a Circle" for a potential single release, but Simpson was uncomfortable with the recording process and it was never completed.

== Critical reception ==
Professional ratings
Review scores
Source	Rating
About.com	2.5/5 stars
AllMusic	3.5/5 stars
Entertainment Weekly	C
IGN	5.7/10
musicOMH	2/5 stars
New York Post	3/4 stars
Rolling Stone	2/5 stars
Slant Magazine	2.5/5 stars
The Guardian	2/5 stars
Yahoo! Music	6/10

A Public Affair received mixed reviews from music critics. The album was both praised and criticized for similarities to previous hits from the 1970s and 1980s; several songs on the album were compared to works by Janet Jackson. A number of critics regarded the album as her best work.

In a positive review, Stephen Thomas Erlewine from AllMusic described A Public Affair as a "party album, pure and simple". Although Erlewine felt the album was inconsistent, he noted that "a good portion of [the album] is indeed pure cheerful fun" and called it her strongest and most entertaining album. Bill Lamb from About.com also felt the album was inconsistent, but described its final five songs as "genuine songs that are worth hearing". Sal Cinquemani of Slant Magazine categorized A Public Affair as "shallow", but also named it her "best [album] to date" with themes of "underrated nostalgia". Spence D. from IGN felt that the album failed to establish Simpson as having a unique identity, saying she "seems to be spending all of her time trying to sound like other people".

Lizzie Ennever from the BBC was critical of Simpson's vocal performance on the album, saying "you get the feeling that she might not even make it through the initial rounds of American Idol". Erlewine felt that Simpson's voice was "suspiciously buried in the mix throughout" the album. Dan Aquilante from the New York Post praised the production on the album, saying that the variety in the album's "upbeat and propulsive songs" was utilized to showcase Simpson's voice. He felt that her vocal delivery was "generic" with a "lack of a clear-cut vocal trademark", but concluded that "Simpson sounds excited to be singing again". Spence D. from IGN praised Simpson's vocal delivery on "Let Him Fly", saying the song showcased Simpson "crooning in a twangy resonance that shows that she can actually sing".

== Commercial performance ==
The album debuted at number five on the US Billboard 200, selling 101,000 copies in its first week. By February 2009, the album had sold 300,000 copies in the United States. On September 29, 2006, A Public Affair was certified Gold by the Recording Industry Association of America (RIAA), denoting 500,000 in shipments.

In Canada, the album debuted at number six, marking Simpson's highest position on the Canadian Albums Chart and was later certified Gold for 50,000 copies sold. A Public Affair also reached the top forty in Ireland and Australia. To date, the album has sold one million copies worldwide.

== Track listing ==
A Public Affair – North American and Australian standard edition
No.	Title	Writer(s)	Producer(s)	Length
1.	"A Public Affair"	Jessica Simpson; Johntá Austin; Greg Kurstin; Sam Watters; Louis Biancaniello; Nickolas Ashford; Valerie Simpson	Lester Mendez	3:21
2.	"You Spin Me Round (Like a Record)"	Pete Burns; Stephen Coy; Michael Percy; Timothy Lever	Cory Rooney	3:49
3.	"B.O.Y."	Erica Driscoll; Ric Ocasek	Gagel; Xandy Barry^{[b]}	3:22
4.	"If You Were Mine"	Watters; Biancaniello; Kurstin; Tamyra Gray; Janet Sewell	Watters; Biancaniello; Kurstin	3:17
5.	"Walkin' 'Round in a Circle"	J. Simpson; Austin; James Harris III; Terry Lewis; Stevie Nicks	Jimmy Jam & Terry Lewis	4:40
6.	"The Lover in Me"	J. Simpson; Austin; Watters; Biancaniello; Gray; Candice Childress	Mendez	3:41
7.	"Swing with Me"	Louis Prima; J. Simpson; Rooney; Dan Shea; Cacee Cobb; Erin Alexander	Rooney; Shea	3:25
8.	"Push Your Tush"	J. Simpson; Harris III; Lewis; Tony Tolbert; Leroy Bonner; William Beck; James Williams; Marvin Pierce; Marshall Jones; Ralph Middlebrooks; Clarence Satchell	Jimmy Jam & Terry Lewis	4:48
9.	"Back to You"	J. Simpson; Harris III; Lewis	Jimmy Jam & Terry Lewis	4:11
10.	"Between You & I"	J. Simpson; Rooney	Rooney; Shea	4:58
11.	"I Don't Want to Care"	J. Simpson; Mikkel Eriksen; Tor Hermansen; Makeba Riddick; Espen Lind; Amund Bjørklund; Magnus Beite; Geir Hvidsten	Stargate	3:57
12.	"Fired Up"	J. Simpson; Scott Storch; Rooney	Storch	3:58
13.	"Let Him Fly"	Patty Griffin	Mendez	3:11
Total length:				50:38

A Public Affair – Walmart, reissue, and worldwide bonus track
No.	Title	Writer(s)	Producer(s)	Length
14.	"I Belong to Me"	Diane Warren	Stargate	3:40
Total length:				54:18

A Public Affair – Japanese edition bonus tracks
No.	Title	Writer(s)	Producer(s)	Length
15.	"A Public Affair" (Karaoke Version)	J. Simpson; Austin; Kurstin; Watters; Biancaniello; Ashford; V. Simpson	Mendez	3:24
16.	"A Public Affair" (Extended Mix)	J. Simpson; Austin; Kurstin; Watters; Biancaniello; Ashford; V. Simpson	Mendez	5:48
Total length:				63:30

A Public Affair – United States iTunes Store and international digital edition bonus track
No.	Title	Writer(s)	Producer(s)	Length
15.	"A Public Affair" (Cass&Dubs Remix)	J. Simpson; Austin; Kurstin; Watters; Biancaniello; Ashford; V. Simpson	Mendez; Cass&Dubs^{[a]}	3:15
Total length:				57:33

A Public Affair – European edition and international digital reissue bonus track
No.	Title	Writer(s)	Producer(s)	Length
15.	"These Boots Are Made for Walkin'"	Lee Hazlewood; Simpson^{[b]}	Jimmy Jam & Terry Lewis	3:59
Total length:				58:17

A Public Affair – International digital reissue bonus tracks
No.	Title	Writer(s)	Producer(s)	Length
16.	"A Public Affair" (Cass&Dubs Remix)	J. Simpson; Austin; Kurstin; Watters; Biancaniello; Ashford; V. Simpson	Mendez; Cass&Dubs^{[a]}	3:15
17.	"A Public Affair" (Extended Mix)	J. Simpson; Austin; Kurstin; Watters; Biancaniello; Ashford; V. Simpson	Mendez	5:48
Total length:				67:26

A Public Affair – Best Buy edition (bonus DVD)
No.	Title	Director(s)	Length
1.	"A Public Affair" (Making of the Video)	Benjamin Hurvitz	21:35
Total length:			21:35

Notes

- ^{^[a]}signifies a remixer
- ^{^[b]}signifies an additional producer

Additional tracks

- The Circuit City edition includes the extended mix of "A Public Affair" as a bonus track.
- The United States iTunes and European CD editions include the music video for "A Public Affair" (4:06).

Sample credits

- "A Public Affair" contains an interpolation of Diana Ross's "Ain't No Mountain High Enough".
- "B.O.Y." contains a sample of The Cars' "Just What I Needed".
- "Walkin' 'Round in a Circle" contains an interpolation of Fleetwood Mac's "Dreams".
- "Swing with Me" is an adaptation of Louis Prima's "Sing, Sing, Sing (With a Swing)".
- "Push Your Tush" contains a sample of the Ohio Players' "Who'd She Coo?".

== Personnel ==
Credits for A Public Affair adapted from AllMusic.

- Ron Allaire – engineer
- Chris August – backing vocals
- Xandy Barry – producer
- Magnus Beite – keyboards
- Louis Biancaniello – keyboards, mixing, producer, programming
- Jerry Brown – drums
- Ravaughn Brown – backing vocals
- Sherree Ford Brown – backing vocals
- Orlando Calzada – engineer
- Vince Cherico – drums
- Cacee Cobb – backing vocals
- Ian Cross – engineer, mixing
- Barry Danielian – trumpet
- Mikkel S. Eriksen – engineer, instrumentation, vocal producer
- Siedah Garrett – backing vocals, vocal arrangement
- Steve Geuting – assistant engineer
- Serban Ghenea – mixing
- Sharlotte Gibson – backing vocals
- Conrad Golding – engineer
- Tamyra Gray – backing vocals
- Keith Gretlein – assistant engineer
- Niki Haris – backing vocals
- Dorian Holly – backing vocals
- Paul Jackson, Jr. – guitar
- Jimmy Jam – keyboards, producer
- Justin King – guitar
- Greg Kurstin – guitar, keyboards, producer, programming
- Dan Kurtz – bass
- Abe Laboriel Jr. – drums
- Evan Lamberg – A&R
- Terry Lewis – producer
- Espen Lind – keyboards
- David Andrew Mann – tenor saxophone
- Matt Marrin – engineer, mixing
- Farra Mathews – A&R
- Chris Megert – vocal arrangement
- Ozzie Melendez – trombone
- Vlado Meller – mastering
- Lester Mendez – arranger, beats, Moog synthesizer, piano, producer
- Jessica Paster – wardrobe
- Ken Paves – hair stylist
- Dave Pensado – mixing
- Rafael Padilla – percussion
- Brett Ratner – photography
- Eric Rennaker – assistant engineer
- Makeba Riddick – backing vocals
- Tim Roberts – mixing assistant
- Reuben Rodriguez – bass
- Cory Rooney – drum programming, keyboards, producer, vocal producer
- Laurie Rosenwald – cover typeset
- Bobby Ross Avila – bass
- Andrew Rugg – engineer
- Dan Shea – keyboards, producer
- Jessica Simpson – vocals, executive producer
- Joe Simpson – executive producer, management
- Scott Storch – producer
- Phil Tan – mixing
- Mike Terry – engineer
- Tony Tolbert – backing vocals
- Valente Torrez – assistant engineer
- David LeVita – guitar
- Peter Wade – engineer
- Brian Warwick – assistant engineer
- Sam Watters – mixing, producer
- David E. Williams – guitar
- Joe Wohlmuth – engineer
- Lyle Workman – guitar
- James "Big Jim" Wright – keyboards
- Joe Zook – mixing

== Charts ==
Chart (2006–07)	Peak position
Australian Albums (ARIA)	33
Canadian Albums (Billboard)	6
Irish Albums (IRMA)	32
Japanese Albums (Oricon)	63
Quebec (ADISQ)	9
Scottish Albums (Official Charts)	76
UK Albums (Official Charts)	65
US Billboard 200	5
US Digital Albums (Billboard)	3
US Top Internet Albums (Billboard)	2

== Certifications ==
Region	Certification	Certified units/sales
Canada (Music Canada)	Gold	50,000^{^}
United States (RIAA)	Gold	500,000^{^}
^{^} Shipments figures based on certification alone.

== Release history ==
Region	Date	Format	Label	Catalog	Ref.
Australia	August 26, 2006	CD	Sony BMG	82876832152	
Canada	August 29, 2006	CD	Sony BMG	82876832152	
United States	August 29, 2006	CD	Epic	88697001742	
Japan	September 27, 2006	CD	Sony BMG	EICP 664	
United Kingdom	February 12, 2007	CD	RCA	88697059592	
