= A Public Affair (song) =

2006 single by Jessica Simpson

Single by Jessica Simpson

from the album A Public Affair
- Released: June 29, 2006
- Recorded: 2005
- Studio: Conway (Los Angeles, CA); Henson (Los Angeles, CA); Westlake (Hollywood, CA)
- Genre: Dance-pop; disco-pop
- Length: 3:21
- Label: Epic
- Songwriters: Jessica Simpson; Johntá Austin; Greg Kurstin; Sam Watters; Louis Biancaniello; Lester Mendez; Nickolas Ashford; Valerie Simpson
- Producer: Lester Mendez

Jessica Simpson singles chronology
"These Boots Are Made for Walkin'" (2005)	"A Public Affair" (2006)	"I Belong to Me" (2006)

Music video
- "A Public Affair" on YouTube

"A Public Affair" is a song by American singer Jessica Simpson. It was co-written by Simpson and produced by Lester Mendez, for Simpson's fourth studio album of the same title. It was released as the album's first single (second overall) on June 29, 2006, by Epic Records. The synth-pop track samples the composition of "Ain't No Mountain High Enough" by Diana Ross. The song's lyrical content speaks about having fun with friends.

"A Public Affair" received generally positive reviews from critics. It was likened by critics to the Madonna song "Holiday" and to songs by Janet Jackson. The song reached the top 10 in Canada, Ireland and Scotland and made the top 20 in US, Australia and UK. The song also topped the Billboard Hot Dance Club Play chart, becoming Simpson's first number one on the chart. The song ranked at number 51 on Top 100 Pop Songs of 2006 by About.com.

== Composition ==
Jessica Simpson "A Public Affair" (2006)
A sample of "A Public Affair"' chorus.

"A Public Affair" lasts for three minutes and 21 seconds. Musically, it is a synth-pop song with a moderate dance groove. The song was noted by critics as reminiscent of the Madonna song "Holiday" (1983). The song contains a retro percussion breakdown and a springy, rubbery bassline. At the end of the song, the background vocalists sing a few lines of "Aaah-Aaah-Aaah" which is a line borrowed from the Diana Ross's "Ain't No Mountain High Enough". According to the sheet music published at Musicnotes.com by EMI Music Publishing, the song is written in the key of D major. It follows a chord progression of G–A–F♯m–Bm, and the song is set in common time with a tempo of 124 beats per minute. Simpson's breathy vocals recall Janet Jackson, spanning from a low note of A_{3} to a high note of B_{4}.

== Critical reception ==
Chuck Taylor of Billboard magazine called the song's production "wildly adventurous" and "maddeningly catchy", and the song itself "A perfect record." About.com's Bill Lamb gave the song 4 out of 5 stars, saying that is "one of the best pop singles of her career" and citing that the song "follows a classic disco game plan even including a retro percussion breakdown. The icing on the cake is a line borrowed from the Diana Ross version of 'Ain't No Mountain High Enough'. As it is, 'A Public Affair' is perfect for early evening party play. With some beefing up, it can easily become a peak hour dance hit". Teen People called the song a fun, frothy dance track reminiscent of early Madonna. Some criticized the song because of its similarity to Madonna's "Holiday". "A Public Affair" received numerous comparisons to Janet Jackson, considered to reference "classic Janet" for its "breathy vocals, cheery, almost sickeningly sweet melody," and "mid-song giggle." Newsday also described it as "channeling Janet-era Jackson."

== Accolades ==
Publication	Accolade	Year	Rank
About.com	The 100 Pop Songs of the Year	2006	51

== Commercial release ==
The Yahoo! Music download of the song gained media attention because it was made available in MP3 format, without digital rights management, which is normally used to restrict copying of commercially released singles. However, the price to download the song was $1.99, higher than the $0.99 norm for most DRM-restricted tracks. The increased price was rationalized not by the DRM-free format, but by offering users the ability to "personalize" the song with a specific name. The single was released in North America and Australia in 2006. Later the song was released in Europe in February 2007.

== Chart performance ==
In the United States, the single debuted at number 39 on the Billboard Hot 100, on the issue dated July 15, 2006. On August 12, 2006, the single peaked at number 14 and was awarded the honor of that week's Greatest Gainer Digital. The single became Simpson's sixth top 20 single in the US and her third song to reach number 14 tied with "With You" (2004) and "These Boots Are Made for Walkin'" (2005). The single stayed on the chart for twelve weeks. The song also peaked at number 16 on Billboard Pop Songs chart and was her fifth top 20 on the chart, since "Take My Breath Away" (2004). The single was certified Gold by RIAA for selling 500,000 copies. The song is her third best selling digital single with 890,000 copies sold. "A Public Affair" was also a success on the club charts. On Hot Dance Club Play chart, the single peaked at number one on the issues dated October 7, 2006. It was her first number one on the chart.

In Canada, "A Public Affair" became Simpson's third top ten single after "Take My Breath Away" (2004), peaking at number eight in July 2006. In Australia, the single debuted at number 18 on the ARIA Charts for the week of August 13, 2006. The next week, it peaked at number 17 and stayed on the chart for ten weeks. The single became her seventh top 20 single in that country.

"A Public Affair" was released in Europe in early 2007. In Sweden, the single peaked at number 36. In Ireland, the song debuted and peaked at number nine on the issue dated February 8, 2007. It was her second highest peak in the country after "These Boots Are Made for Walkin'" (2005). In the United Kingdom, the song debuted at number 20 on the issue dated February 17, 2007. The single stayed on the chart for four weeks.

== Music video ==
The skating rink as shown in the music video

The music video was filmed on June 23–24, 2006, at the Moonlight Rollerway in Glendale, California. It features appearances by Christina Applegate, Christina Milian, Eva Longoria, Maria Menounos, Andy Dick, and Ryan Seacrest. It introduces Australian Reshad Strik, whose participation precipitated many comments on his resemblance to Nick Lachey, Simpson's ex-husband, and Menounos, who resembled Vanessa Minnillo, who was dating Lachey at the time Simpson split with her ex-husband. The video was directed by Brett Ratner. According with MTV, the music video was heavily influenced by Olivia Newton-John's "Xanadu" and Madonna's music videos for "Sorry" and "Music", taking references to choreographed roller-skating and celeb making a cameo as the star's chauffeur, respectively.

On July 19, Simpson visited MTV's Total Request Live to premiere the video. The following day the video entered the TRL countdown at number six, the highest debut for any Simpson video; on its third day on the countdown, it reached number two. The video spent a total of 28 days on the TRL countdown. The video reached number eight on Canada's MuchMusic chart.

== Credits and personnel ==
- Jessica Simpson – vocals, songwriting
- Lester Mendez – production, songwriting
- Johntá Austin – songwriting
- Greg Kurstin – songwriting
- Sam Watters – songwriting
- Louis Biancaniello – songwriting
- Nickolas Ashford – songwriting
- Valerie Simpson – songwriting

Credits adapted from A Public Affair liner notes.

== Track listings and formats ==
- Australian CD single
1. "A Public Affair" (radio edit)
2. "A Public Affair" (extended version)
3. "A Public Affair" (karaoke version)
- Maxi CD single
1. "A Public Affair" (radio edit)
2. "A Public Affair" (extended version)
3. "A Public Affair" (instrumental version)
4. "A Public Affair" (remix)
5. "A Public Affair" (video)
- UK and German CD single
1. "A Public Affair"
2. "A Public Affair" (Alex Greggs Remix)

== Charts ==
=== Weekly charts ===
Chart (2006–2007)	Peak position
Australia (ARIA)	17
Canada CHR/Top 40 (Billboard)	13
Canada Hot AC (Billboard)	46
European Hot 100 Singles	63
Germany (GfK)	72
Global Dance Songs (Billboard)	36
Hungary (Editors' Choice Top 40)	32
Ireland (IRMA)	9
Romania (Romanian Top 100)	67
Slovakia Airplay (ČNS IFPI)	74
South Korea GAON (International Chart)	111
Scottish Singles Sales (Official Charts)	10
Sweden (Sverigetopplistan)	36
UK Singles (Official Charts)	20
UK Physical Singles (OCC)	6
US Billboard Hot 100	14
US Adult Pop Airplay (Billboard)	36
US Dance Club Songs (Billboard)	1
US Dance Airplay (Billboard)	6
US Pop Airplay (Billboard)	16
Venezuela Pop Rock (Record Report)	11

=== Year-end charts ===
Chart	Position
US Hot Dance Club Songs (Billboard)	36
US Pop 100 (Billboard)	92

== Certifications ==
Region	Certification	Certified units/sales
United Kingdom	—	25,800
United States (RIAA)	Gold	500,000^{*}
^{*} Sales figures based on certification alone.

== Release history ==
Release dates and formats for "A Public Affair"
Region	Date	Format	Label	Ref.
Russia	July 14, 2006	Contemporary hit radio	Sony	
Germany	March 2, 2007	CD single	Sony	

== See also ==
- List of number-one dance singles of 2006 (U.S.)
