= My Only Wish (song) =

2010 single by Jessica Simpson

Promotional single by Jessica Simpson

from the album Happy Christmas
- Released: November 11, 2010
- Studio: Henson (Los Angeles, CA); Triangle Sound (Atlanta, GA)
- Length: 3:55
- Label: Primary Wave Records
- Songwriters: Jessica Simpson, Aaron Pearce, Christopher Stewart
- Producers: The Dream, Christopher Stewart

"My Only Wish" is a holiday song written by Jessica Simpson, Aaron Pearce, and Christopher Stewart, recorded by American singer-songwriter Jessica Simpson. It was released by Primary Wave Records on November 22, 2010, as the promotional single from her seventh studio album, Happy Christmas. The track received mixed reviews from music critics, with some commentators criticizing the song's close similarity to past hit "All I Want for Christmas is You". It premiered at On Air with Ryan Seacrest and the official Jessica Simpson website, jessicasimpson.com, on November 11, 2010. Simpson also notably allowed the song's free distribution on iTunes for several months.

== Background and composition ==
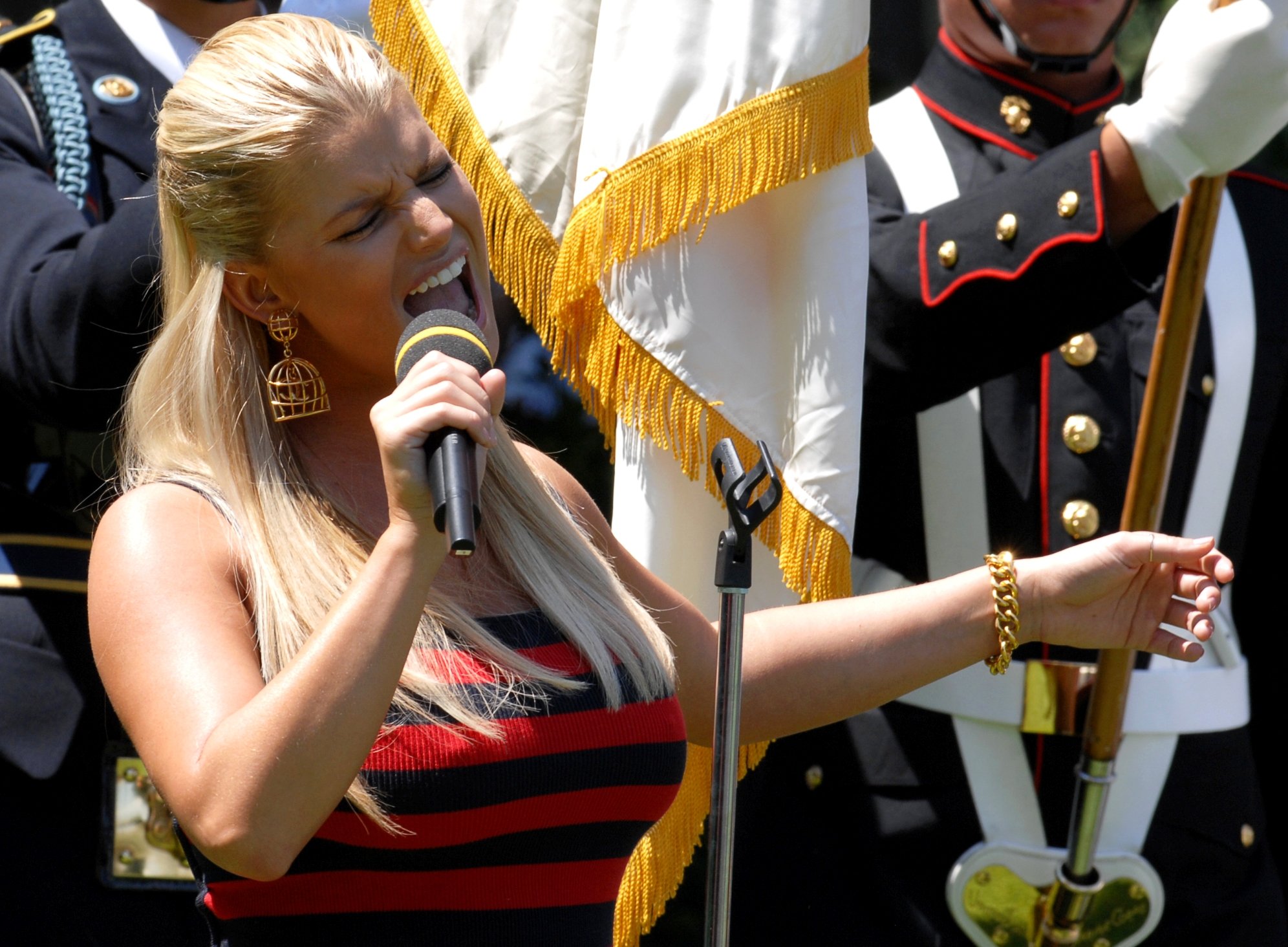
Simpson in 2009

Simpson was interviewed by E! News and PopSugar.com where she revealed that she is back in the studio, working on a new Christmas album. On September 15, 2010, it was announced that Simpson was working with the producers of The-Dream and Tricky Stewart in her next two albums. On October 12, 2010, Simpson announced via Twitter that she had completed recording this album.

"My Only Wish" was written by Aaron Pearce, Jessica Simpson and Christopher Stewart. and produced by The Dream and Christopher Stewart. The song is an uptempo, composed in a pop, Christmas and dance-pop style. "My Only Wish" is a love song, a good rhythm for Christmas, featuring pop music and traditional rhythms, drum notes, and hard knocks and grooves. Background vocals are present throughout the chorus.

== Reception ==
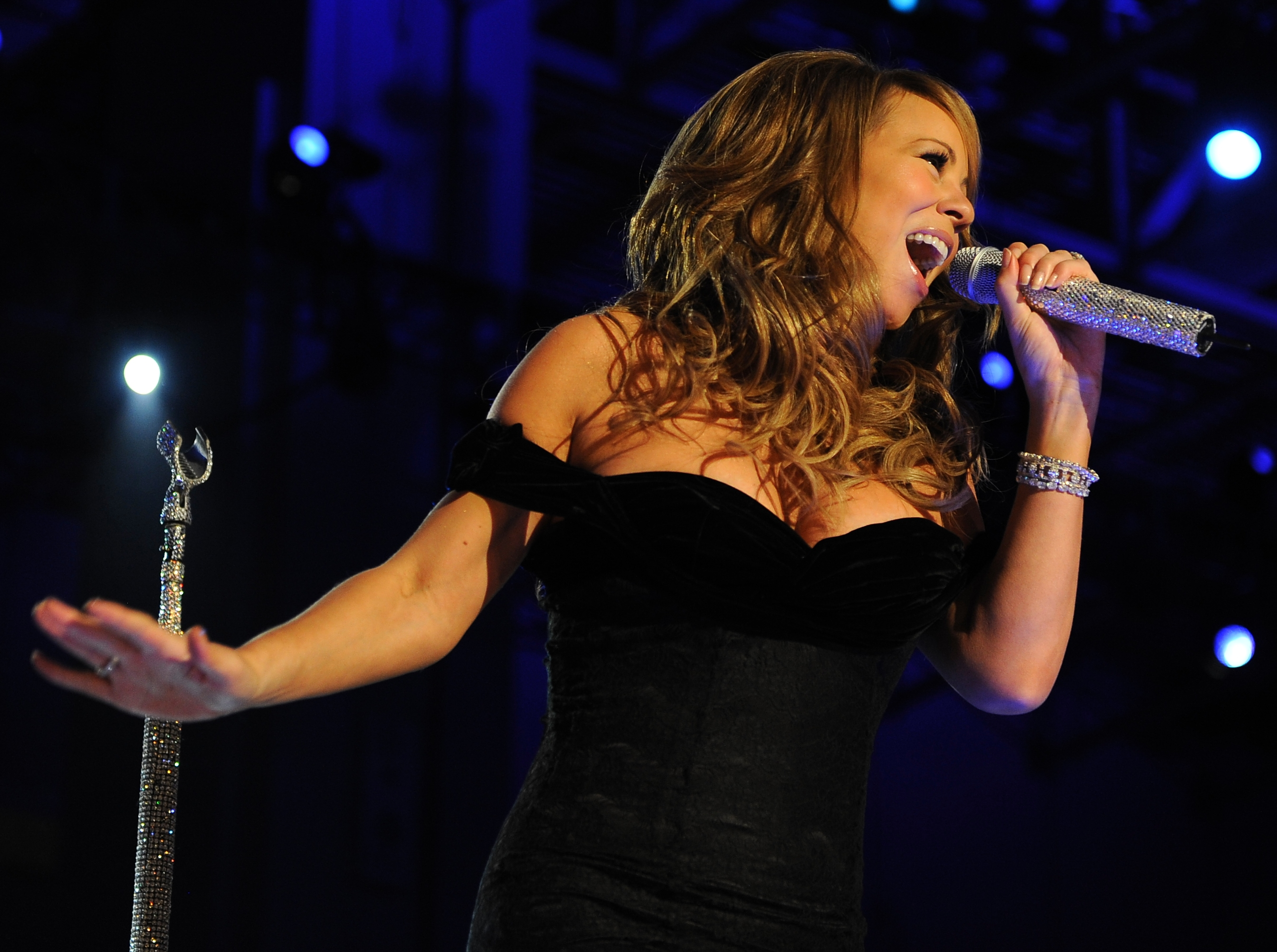
"My Only Wish" received comparisons to Mariah Carey's 1994 hit single "All I Want for Christmas Is You".

"My Only Wish" received mixed reviews from music critics. It has been compared to "All I Want for Christmas is You" by Mariah Carey. Grace Cicciotti of iphone.funweek, commented, the two items in question, in fact, closely resemble, perhaps too much. "My only wish", written by "The-Dream" has the same melody of "All I Want for Christmas is You ', the same high note and even the same meaning: not change much between all the phrase 'All I want for Christmas is you, baby "and" My only wish for Christmas is you'. In summary, it appears that much of Jessica suffers a lack of inspiration ... MTV said, we know that Mariah Carey has returned to the yuletide jam with her Merry Christmas II You. And now we get some Christmas spirit from Jessica Simpson, with the jaunty, playful "My Only Wish." Not unlike Mariah Carey's "All I Want for Christmas Is You", Simpson's track covers up some heartache with a buoyant and peppy track, complete with Salvation Army Christmas bells and fireside pianos. GAWKER commented, Is Jessica Simpson's New Christmas Song a Complete Mariah Carey Rip Off?. Jessica Simpson debuted the first single from her upcoming Christmas album, called, "My Only Wish (For Christmas Is You)." One problem: it's a total rip off of Mariah Carey's "All I Want For Christmas Is You."

== Format and track listing ==
- Digital download
1. "My Only Wish" – 3:55

== Credits and personnel ==
- Songwriting – Jessica Simpson, Aaron Pearce, Christopher Stewart
- Record producer – The Dream, Christopher Stewart
- Vocals – Jessica Simpson
