= American Idol Season 6: Greatest Hits =

Season 6: Greatest Hits

Compilation album by Various Artists
- Released: June 12, 2007
- Recorded: March–May, 2007
- Genre: Pop
- Label: RCA
- Producer: 19 Recordings

American Idol: Greatest Hits was released on iTunes on June 12, 2007. The album was finally released almost a month after the May finale. The album contains 11 cover songs, by the finalists and Jordin Sparks' winning single. The Collector's Edition contains 76 songs and includes cover songs by top 12 and, again, Jordin Sparks' winning single. Neither collection of songs was released as an actual CD but both are available exclusively through the iTunes Store. As of August 2009, it was still in the Billboard top 200 pop charts.

== Track listing ==
1. You Give Love a Bad Name (Bon Jovi) - Blake Lewis
2. Paint It, Black (The Rolling Stones) - Gina Glocksen
3. As Long as He Needs Me (from Oliver) - Melinda Doolittle
4. She's Not There (The Zombies) - Chris Sligh
5. Bésame Mucho - Sanjaya Malakar
6. This Ain't a Love Song (Bon Jovi) - LaKisha Jones
7. Smooth (Santana & Rob Thomas) - Chris Richardson
8. Turn the Beat Around (Vicki Sue Robinson) - Haley Scarnato
9. Love Hangover (Diana Ross) - Stephanie Edwards
10. You Can't Hurry Love (The Supremes/Phil Collins) - Brandon Rogers
11. Blaze of Glory (Jon Bon Jovi) - Phil Stacey
12. This Is My Now - Jordin Sparks

== The Collector's Edition ==
Season 6: The Collector's Edition

Compilation album by Various Artists
- Released: June 12, 2007
- Recorded: March–May, 2007
- Genre: Pop
- Label: RCA
- Producer: 19 Recordings

=== Track listing ===
Jordin Sparks

1. This Is My Now
2. Wishing On a Star
3. To Love Somebody
4. You'll Never Walk Alone
5. A Broken Wing
6. Rhythm Is Gonna Get You
7. On a Clear Day
8. Hey Baby
9. I (Who Have Nothing)
10. If We Hold on Together

Blake Lewis

11. This Love
12. You Should Be Dancing
13. Imagine
14. You Give Love a Bad Name
15. When the Stars Go Blue
16. I Need to Know
17. Mack the Knife
18. Lovesong
19. Time of the Season
20. You Keep Me Hangin' On

Melinda Doolittle

21. I'm a Woman
22. How Can You Mend a Broken Heart
23. Have a Nice Day
24. There Will Come a Day
25. Trouble Is a Woman
26. Sway
27. I Got Rhythm
28. Heaven Knows
29. As Long As He Needs Me
30. Home

LaKisha Jones

31. Stayin' Alive
32. This Ain't a Love Song
33. I Believe
34. Jesus, Take the Wheel
35. Conga
36. Stormy Weather
37. Last Dance
38. Diamonds Are Forever
39. God Bless the Child

Chris Richardson

40. Wanted Dead or Alive
41. Change the World
42. Mayberry
43. Smooth
44. Don't Get Around Much Anymore
45. Don't Speak
46. Don't Let the Sun Catch You Crying
47. The Boss

Phil Stacey

48. Blaze of Glory
49. The Change
50. Where the Blacktop Ends
51. Maria Maria
52. Night & Day
53. Every Breath You Take
54. Tobacco Road
55. I'm Gonna Make You Love Me

Sanjaya Malakar

56. Something to Talk About
57. Bésame Mucho
58. Cheek to Cheek
59. Bathwater
60. You Really Got Me
61. Ain't No Mountain High Enough

Haley Scarnato

62. Turn the Beat Around
63. Ain't Misbehavin'
64. True Colors
65. Tell Him
66. Missing You

Gina Glocksen

67. Smile
68. I'll Stand By You
69. Paint It, Black
70. Love Child

Chris Sligh

71. Every Little Thing She Does Is Magic
72. She's Not There
73. Endless Love

Stephanie Edwards

74. You Don't Have to Say You Love Me
75. Love Hangover

Brandon Rogers

76. You Can't Hurry Love
