= American Idols Live! Tour 2007 =

2007 summer concert tour

- Tour by American Idol
- Jordin Sparks, Chris Sligh, Blake Lewis, LaKisha Jones; Phil Stacey, Sanjaya Malakar, Chris Richardson, Haley Scarnato; Melinda Doolittle, Gina Glocksen
- Start date: July 6, 2007
- End date: September 23, 2007
- No. of shows: 59
- Box office: US$23 million from 55 shows

American Idol concert chronology
- American Idols Live! Tour 2006 (2006); American Idols Live! Tour 2007 (2007); American Idols Live! Tour 2008 (2008)

American Idols Live! Tour 2007 was a summer and fall concert tour in the United States and Canada featuring the top 10 contestants of the sixth season of American Idol, which aired in 2007. It was sponsored by Kellogg's Pop-Tarts. The 59-date tour started on July 6 and ended on September 23.

It follows in the tradition of other American Idol summer tours following the completion of each season in May.

== Performers ==
Jordin Sparks (winner)	Blake Lewis (2nd place)
Melinda Doolittle (3rd place)	LaKisha Jones (4th place)
Chris Richardson (5th place)	Phil Stacey (6th place)
Sanjaya Malakar (7th place)	Haley Scarnato (8th place)
Gina Glocksen (9th place)	Chris Sligh (10th place)

== Show overview ==
The show was largely dominated by ensemble performances. With the exception of Jordin Sparks, Blake Lewis and Sanjaya Malakar, every other performers each had only one solo performance. The first half ended with the Blake Lewis' set, while Jordin Sparks performed her set before the traditional final performance by all 10 performers. The final group performance however differed from previous tours by being a collection of solos rather than a group song with each performer reprising a short segment of their solo song.

== Setlist ==
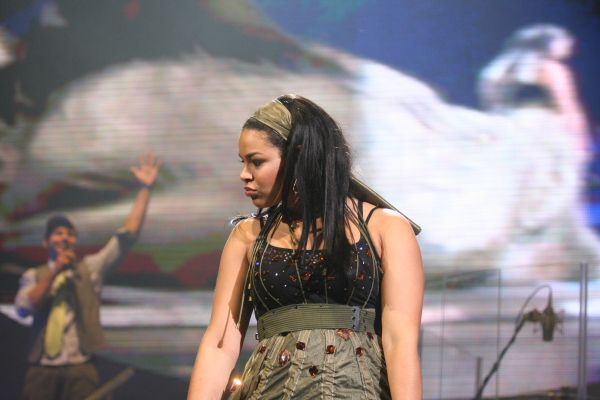
Jordin Sparks on American Idol tour 2007

- Chris Sligh, Gina Glocksen, Haley Scarnato, Sanjaya Malakar, Phil Stacey, Chris Richardson, Blake Lewis and Jordin Sparks – "Let's Get It Started" (The Black Eyed Peas)
- Melinda Doolittle and Lakisha Jones – "Baby Love" (The Supremes) and "Stop! In the Name of Love" (The Supremes)
- Doolittle, Jones and Richardson – "I Heard It Through the Grapevine" (Marvin Gaye)
- Doolittle and Malakar – "Proud Mary" (Ike & Tina Turner)
- Stacey – "Blaze of Glory" (Jon Bon Jovi)
- Glocksen and Sligh – "Thnks fr th Mmrs" (Fall Out Boy)
- Scarnato – "When God-Fearin' Women Get the Blues" (Martina McBride)
- Malakar – "Thriller" (Michael Jackson) and "The Way You Make Me Feel" (Michael Jackson)
- Sligh – "Typical" (Mutemath)
- Scarnato, Glocksen and Jones – "Lady Marmalade" (Labelle)
- Sligh, Malakar and Stacey – "I Want It That Way" (Backstreet Boys)
- Sparks and Richardson – "What Hurts the Most" (Rascal Flatts)
- Sparks and Doolittle – "This Will Be (An Everlasting Love)" (Natalie Cole)
- Lewis – "Time of the Season" (The Zombies), "She Will Be Loved" (Maroon 5)/"With or Without You" (U2), "You Give Love a Bad Name" (Bon Jovi)

Intermission

- Stacey (Glocksen, Scarnato, Jones, and Doolittle on backup) – "America the Beautiful"
- Glocksen, Scarnato, Jones and Doolittle – "Boogie Woogie Bugle Boy" (The Andrews Sisters), "America" (Prince)
- Sligh, Malakar, Stacey, Richardson, and Lewis – "Crazy" (Gnarls Barkley) and "Hey Jude" (The Beatles)
- Glocksen – "Who Knew" (Pink)
- Lewis and Richardson – "Ain't No Sunshine" (Bill Withers), "Virtual Insanity" (Jamiroquai), "Geek in the Pink" (Jason Mraz) and "SexyBack" (Justin Timberlake)
- Jones – "I Will Always Love You (Dolly Parton; popularized by Whitney Houston)
- Richardson – "This Love" (Maroon 5)
- Stacey and Glocksen – "It's Your Love" (Tim McGraw & Faith Hill)
- Sligh, Scarnato, Malakar, and Richardson- "Life Is a Highway" (Tom Cochrane)
- Doolittle – "(You Make Me Feel Like) A Natural Woman" (Aretha Franklin)
- Glocksen, Scarnato, Jones and Doolittle – "Ain't No Other Man" (Christina Aguilera)
- Sparks – "I (Who Have Nothing) (Shirley Bassey), Heartbreaker" (Pat Benatar), "You Were Meant for Me" (Jewel), "A Broken Wing" (Martina McBride), Livin' on a Prayer (Bon Jovi) and This Is My Now (Jordin Sparks)
- Top 10 Finale – "Blaze of Glory" (Stacey), "The Way You Make Me Feel" (Malakar), "When God-Fearin' Woman Gets the Blues" (Scarnato), "Typical" (Sligh), "You Give Love a Bad Name" (Lewis), "Who Knew" (Glocksen), "This Love" (Richardson), "I Will Always Love You" (Jones), "Natural Woman" (Doolittle), "This Is My Now" (Sparks)

== Additional notes ==
- At some of the shows, Blake Lewis came onto the stage in disguise as the janitor before the show started.
- Blake Lewis performed his song "She Loves the Way" at the last show in Manchester, New Hampshire.
- In the original set list, Jones was to perform "And I Am Telling You I'm Not Going" instead of "I Will Always Love You".
- Two songs performed in the first show in Sunrise, Florida were cut in later shows – Blake Lewis's duet with Melinda Doolittle "Killing Me Softly with His Song" (Roberta Flack) and "Another One Bites The Dust" (Queen) by Sligh Glocksen, Scarnato and Doolittle. The two songs were performed before and after Richardson's This Love.
- The songs performed during Blake Lewis duet with Chris Richardson varied at different shows.
- In the earlier shows, Blake Lewis' "She Will Be Loved" was done without segueing into part of "With or Without You".
- Blake Lewis claimed he locked Sanjaya Malakar up in a closet during the tour for being "disrespectful".

== Special occasions ==
During the August 7, 2007 concert in Rosemont, Illinois, Gina Glocksen was surprised as her long-time boyfriend proposed to her following her duet with Phil Stacey.

After Sanjaya Malakar's solo during the September 9, 2007 concert in Washington, D.C., Sanjaya's sister Shyamali surprised him onstage. She placed a Fanjaya crafted "birthday boy" crown on his head as she led the audience in singing "Happy Birthday" to Sanjaya on the eve of his 18th birthday.

== Tour dates ==
Date	City	Country	Venue	Attendance			Gross
Date	City	Country	Venue	Sales	Capacity	Percentage	Gross
July 6, 2007	Sunrise	United States	BankAtlantic Center	7,738	10,938	71%	$476,428
July 7, 2007	Tampa	United States	St. Pete Times Forum	7,761	9,876	79%	$475,416
July 8, 2007	Jacksonville	United States	Jacksonville Veterans Memorial Arena	7,089	9,450	75%	$429,908
July 10, 2007	Greenville	United States	Bi-Lo Center	6,714	11,767	57%	$410,576
July 11, 2007	Nashville	United States	Sommet Center	5,720	9,560	60%	$363,742
July 12, 2007	Birmingham	United States	BJCC Arena	3,775	9,703	39%	$243,398
July 13, 2007	North Little Rock	United States	Alltel Arena	5,324	9,659	55%	$333,171
July 15, 2007	Houston	United States	Toyota Center	5,529	10,659	52%	$345,683
July 16, 2007	San Antonio	United States	AT&T Center	4,370	10,836	40%	$281,533
July 18, 2007	Glendale	United States	Jobing.com Arena	9,701	10,412	93%	$598,130
July 19, 2007	San Diego	United States	San Diego Sports Arena	5,756	8,839	65%	$369,306
July 20, 2007	Fresno	United States	Save Mart Center	4,604	9,313	49%	$289,648
July 22, 2007	Anaheim	United States	Honda Center	7,922	10,920	73%	$488,294
July 23, 2007	Los Angeles	United States	Staples Center	8,263	12,074	68%	$455,119
July 24, 2007	San Jose	United States	HP Pavilion at San Jose	8,874	10,272	86%	$532,145
July 25, 2007	Sacramento	United States	ARCO Arena	8,239	10,883	76%	$497,165
July 27, 2007	Tacoma	United States	Tacoma Dome	8,024	9,589	84%	$488,145
July 28, 2007	Portland	United States	Rose Garden	5,439	10,339	53%	$327,222
July 30, 2007	Nampa	United States	Idaho Center	3,577	8,013	45%	$217,035
July 31, 2007	Salt Lake City	United States	EnergySolutions Arena	5,042	11,532	48%	$291,785
August 3, 2007	Omaha	United States	Qwest Center	5,237	12,812	41%	$321,870
August 4, 2007	Saint Paul	United States	Xcel Energy Center	9,843	14,691	67%	$549,488
August 5, 2007	Milwaukee	United States	Bradley Center	5,998	9,445	64%	$363,899
August 7, 2007	Rosemont	United States	Allstate Arena	10,034	12,527	80%	$605,172
August 8, 2007	Moline	United States	iWireless Center	4,566	9,776	47%	$280,862
August 9, 2007	St. Louis	United States	Scottrade Center	5,889	9,167	64%	$353,508
August 11, 2007	Columbus	United States	Schottenstein Center	7,436	10,212	73%	$444,707
August 12, 2007	Auburn Hills	United States	The Palace of Auburn Hills	9,245	11,358	81%	$550,930
August 13, 2007	Cleveland	United States	Wolstein Center	5,611	10,026	56%	$343,377
August 14, 2007	Toronto	Canada	Air Canada Centre	6,727	11,205	60%	$419,750
August 16, 2007	Indianapolis	United States	Pepsi Coliseum	3,200	5,000	64%	Unknown
August 17, 2007	Louisville	United States	Freedom Hall	4,971	14,618	34%	$228,125
August 18, 2007	Sedalia	United States	Missouri State Fair	—N/a			
August 19, 2007	Des Moines	United States	Iowa State Fair	4,895	10,400	47%	$205,590
August 22, 2007	Pittsburgh	United States	Mellon Arena	7,542	9,308	81%	$434,423
August 23, 2007	Rochester	United States	Blue Cross Arena	5,613	8,275	68%	$348,244
August 24, 2007	Uniondale	United States	Nassau Coliseum	17,767	21,176	85%	$1,045,485
August 25, 2007	Uniondale	United States	Nassau Coliseum	17,767	21,176	85%	$1,045,485
August 27, 2007	Hartford	United States	Hartford Civic Center	7,635	9,564	80%	$467,260
August 28, 2007	East Rutherford	United States	Continental Airlines Arena	20,272	23,576	86%	$1,179,713
August 29, 2007	East Rutherford	United States	Continental Airlines Arena	20,272	23,576	86%	$1,179,713
August 30, 2007	Albany	United States	Times Union Center	6,078	7,100	85%	$364,430
September 1, 2007	Allentown	United States	Allentown Fair	7,023	9,967	71%	$455,080
September 2, 2007	Syrasuse	United States	New York State Fair	8,678	16,377	53%	$392,260
September 4, 2007	Portland	United States	Cumberland County Civic Center	5,585	5,866	95%	$334,626
September 5, 2007	Worcester	United States	DCU Center	9,754	10,508	93%	$569,866
September 7, 2007	Philadelphia	United States	Wachovia Center	9,135	11,386	80%	$553,008
September 8, 2007	Atlantic City	United States	Boardwalk Hall	9,403	10,521	89%	$564,826
September 9, 2007	Washington, D.C.	United States	Verizon Center	9,584	11,267	85%	$570,254
September 11, 2007	Greensboro	United States	Greensboro Coliseum	3,479	5,515	63%	$216,735
September 12, 2007	Duluth	United States	Arena at Gwinnett Center	7,405	9,238	80%	$441,785
September 13, 2007	Memphis	United States	FedExForum	3,116	7,900	39%	Unknown
September 15, 2007	Huntington	United States	Big Sandy Superstore Arena	5,300	6,528	81%	$332,478
September 16, 2007	Charlottesville	United States	John Paul Jones Arena	5,386	6,388	84%	$327,095
September 18, 2007	Hampton	United States	Hampton Coliseum	5,949	7,942	75%	$367,237
September 19, 2007	Baltimore	United States	1st Mariner Arena	6,824	9,240	74%	$417,726
September 20, 2007	Bridgeport	United States	Arena at Harbor Yard	6,622	7,770	85%	$413,929
September 22, 2007	Manchester	United States	Verizon Wireless Arena	13,279	15,488	86%	$801,343
September 23, 2007	Manchester	United States	Verizon Wireless Arena	13,279	15,488	86%	$801,343
TOTAL				383,331 / 576,771 (66%)			$23,178,930

== Response ==
The 2007 tour turned out to be much less successful than the Season 5 tour. None of its first 30 shows were sellouts and only one stop bested the 93% capacity mark and that was the July 18 stop in Jordin Sparks' hometown of Glendale, Arizona. In addition 14 of the first 30 shows were below the 60% capacity mark. The lower attendance was blamed on the cast of contestants as well as the ticket prices. Nevertheless, due to the higher ticket prices, the tour managed to gross over 23 million in U.S. dollars with nearly 400,000 tickets sold as totaled from the tour receipts of the 54 shows that reported to Billboard. It was ranked number 41 in Pollstar Year End Top 100 Tour for 2007 with a gross of 20.9 million from the 50 shows that reported to Pollstar.

== Tour summary ==
- Number of shows – 59 (none sold out)
- Total gross – $23,178,930 (53 shows; revenues in Indianapolis and Memphis are unknown)
- Total attendance – 383,331 (55 shows)
- Average attendance – 6,970 (69%)
- Average ticket price – $60.47
- Highest gross – Rosemont, Illinois – $605,172
- Lowest gross – Nampa, Idaho – $217,035
- Highest attendance – East Rutherford, New Jersey – 10,136 (86%) – average of 2 shows in East Rutherford
- Lowest attendance – Nampa, Idaho – 3,577 (45%)
