= Vote for the Worst =

Entertainment website that encouraged voting for poor performers

VoteForTheWorst.com
- Website type: Entertainment website
- Owner: VoteForTheWorst.com
- Creator: Dave Della Terza
- Commercial: Yes
- Registration: Optional
- Launched: 2004
- Current status: Shut Down June 2013

VoteForTheWorst.com (VFTW) was a website devoted to voting for the worst, most entertaining, most hated or quirkiest contestants on the Fox Network television series American Idol as well as the NBC Network television series The Voice. Smaller campaigns have also been started on the site for CTV's Canadian Idol, Fox's On the Lot and The Next Great American Band, NBC's America's Got Talent, and ABC's Dancing with the Stars. The website was started in 2004 during the third season of American Idol. Vote for the Worst also had a weekly radio show that featured guests such as Ayla Brown, Trenyce, Leslie Hunt, Steffi DiDomenicantonio, Alex Wagner-Trugman and Todrick Hall. The site closed down in June 2013.

== History ==
VFTW started at the Survivor Sucks message board and moved to a GeoCities website during season three of American Idol. The very first VFTW pick during Season 3 was Jennifer Hudson, dubbed "Boomquisha Santiago" or just "Boomie," during the semi-finals, but the site never picked her again as she improved in further weeks. When Hudson sang "Circle of Life" during finals, the camera went to a shot of Hudson's family members, with a cousin who sat with her arms folded while the others cheered. This cousin was dubbed "Whatevia," the namesake of VFTW's annual awards. The site began to upset regular Idol viewers with their support of John Stevens and Jasmine Trias, but it was largely unknown to the general public at this time.

During American Idol's fourth season, the site moved to its own domain name. VFTW gained its first bit of notoriety when Scott Savol outlasted Constantine Maroulis in the top 6 of Idol's fourth season and again appeared in the news when young crooner Kevin Covais made it to the top 11 in season five.

Season six of American Idol became a turning point for the website due to its support of candidates Antonella Barba and Sanjaya Malakar. Vote for the Worst was one of the first websites to break the story about Antonella Barba's racy online pictures. The site then made headlines by proving that the raciest pictures that appeared online (involving a Barba lookalike performing a sexual act) were not of Barba. After Barba and Sundance Head (another VFTW candidate) were voted out of the competition, Vote for the Worst selected Sanjaya Malakar as their pick. Malakar went on to last 6 more weeks in the competition, becoming a cultural phenomenon while gaining momentum along the way with support from celebrities such as Howard Stern. Entertainment Weekly called Malakar "the most popular Vote for the Worst candidate ever" and Malakar helped make Vote for the Worst a household name.

Season seven of American Idol saw the site stir up some major controversies. As the season began, Vote for the Worst posted a blog that season seven was being stacked with contestants with prior music industry experience and the controversy was picked up by news sources, including MTV, who decided to ask American Idol producer Ken Warwick about the issue. The site went a step further to also prove that Randy Jackson, a judge on American Idol, was the vice president of A&R at MCA Records while Carly Smithson, a season 7 contestant, recorded an album there. The second controversy started by the site was exposing contestant David Hernandez as a former gay stripper. Outside all of the controversies, Vote for the Worst supported Kristy Lee Cook and Brooke White when more popular Carly Smithson was eliminated.

During season eight of American Idol, Vote for the Worst's longest running contestant was Megan Joy, a quirky singer from Utah who made bird noises. The site also posted pictures of popular contestant Adam Lambert kissing another man, leading the general public to question Adam's sexuality due to the fact that he had not discussed this topic on the show. Bill O'Reilly ran Vote for the Worst's pictures of Adam during a news segment, but the show cropped the pictures to eliminate the actual kiss.

During season nine, Tim Urban broke the record for Vote for the Worst's longest-running American Idol pick ever, as well as tying for longest pick ever with Jaydee Bixby of Canadian Idol Season 3. He remained their pick for nine weeks: from the top 24 to the top seven. He was eliminated in 7th—the same week as Sanjaya Malakar in Season 6. Michael Lynche was originally selected for Top 5 week, but after the performances, the website switched to Casey James, marking the first time the website had changed its mind on which contestant to vote for based on performance alone. VFTW chose Lee DeWyze for the finale, and he won. This supported VFTW's theory that a female will never win the show again. According to bloggers at VFTW, the seasons have resulted in "3, white, male, brunette, soft-rockers" winners in a row.

Vote for the Worst was successful during seasons ten and eleven, supporting the 4th and 5th "white guys with a guitar," Scotty McCreery and Phillip Phillips, to win the title in five years.

In January 2013, the site's creator, Dave Della Terza, announced that the site would be shutting down, but not before covering one final season of American Idol. The shutdown was planned for June 2013, though it was not specified whether the site would simply be discontinuing all updates and left behind as an archive, or whether it would disappear entirely. As of April 2014, visiting the site results in a page indicating that the domain name has been "parked" with Go Daddy and is available for purchase.

== Expansion to other shows ==
Because of the success of their American Idol campaign, Vote for the Worst has expanded its site to sometimes include other shows. The site helped support Casey Leblanc's 6 week run during Canadian Idol 3, Jaydee Bixby's unprecedented 9 week "worst" run from the final 10 to the final 2 during Canadian Idol 5, and Bristol Palin on Dancing with the Stars.

Vote for the Worst's mixed bag extends to other shows. The site had some success with a group like Light of Doom during The Next Great American Band, but was unable to help others such as Boy Shakira during America's Got Talent.

== Reaction from American Idol ==
American Idol producers rarely acknowledge the site, but Nigel Lythgoe, an executive producer, did issue a statement, calling Vote for the Worst "a fly buzzing around a cow" during season six of American Idol to play down any press the site had received about being influential. In later seasons, Lythgoe has had a more playful repartee with the website, sending humorous tweets to the site's Twitter account. Legal action has been threatened against the website from fans of American Idol, but to date neither Fox nor the series have issued statements regarding any lawsuits. Della Terza claims that lawyers involved with the program have contacted him twice about filing a lawsuit, but nothing has yet been filed against the site.

While many American Idol fans claim Vote for the Worst promotes hate speech and bullying on their message boards and online comments, some lesser known contestants from American Idol have embraced the site. Josiah Leming, a contestant from season 7, is a member of the website and gave an interview to their weekly radio show. Chris Sligh, a season 6 contestant, gave a shoutout to site creator Della Terza during the top 11 performance show by saying "Hi, Dave." Sligh and fellow contestant Phil Stacey have also posted on the site's message board, along with many other former contestants such as Brenna Gethers, Chris Labelle, Phuong Pham, and Montana Martin Iles. Season 7 finalist Amanda Overmyer has also been vocal about her support of the website. Even season 9 runner-up Crystal Bowersox has posted on American Idol's Facebook and Twitter that she loves VFTW.

== VFTW-supported contestants ==
=== American Idol ===
Season 3

- Jennifer Hudson (Semifinals Week 1 Only)
- Briana Ramirez-Rial (Semifinals Week 2)
- Lisa Wilson (Semifinals Week 4)
- Jon Peter Lewis (Wild Card Only)
- Leah LaBelle (Top 12)
- Matthew Rogers (Top 11)
- John Stevens (Top 10 to Top 6)
- Jasmine Trias (Top 5 to Top 3): Third Place

Season 4

- Janay Castine (Semifinals Weeks 1–3)
- Constantine Maroulis (Semifinals Weeks 1–3 & Top 10 Only)
- Mikalah Gordon (Top 12 to Top 11)
- Scott Savol (Top 9 to Top 5)
- Anthony Fedorov (Top 4)
- Carrie Underwood (Top 3 to Finale): Winner

Season 5

- Brenna Gethers (Semifinals Weeks 1–2)
- Bobby Bennett (Semifinals Week 1)
- David Radford (Semifinals Week 2)
- Kevin Covais (Semifinals Week 3 to Top 11)
- Kellie Pickler (Semifinals Week 3, Top 10 to Top 6)
- Taylor Hicks (Top 5 to Finale): Winner

Season 6

- Sundance Head (Semifinals Weeks 1–3)
- Antonella Barba (Semifinals Weeks 1–3)
- Sanjaya Malakar (Top 12 to Top 7)
- Phil Stacey (Top 6)
- LaKisha Jones (Top 4)
- Blake Lewis (Top 3 to Finale): Runner-Up

Season 7

- Danny Noriega (Men's Semifinals Weeks 1–3)
- Amy Davis (Women's Semifinals Week 1)
- Amanda Overmyer (Semifinals Week 2 to Top 11)
- Kristy Lee Cook (Top 10 to Top 7)
- Brooke White (Top 6 to Top 5)
- Jason Castro (Top 4)
- David Archuleta (Top 3 to Finale): Runner-Up

Season 8

- Tatiana Del Toro (Semifinals Week 1, Wild-Card)
- Nick Mitchell (Semifinals Week 2)
- Alex Wagner-Trugman (Semifinals Week 3)
- Megan Joy (Top 13 to Top 9)
- Scott MacIntyre (Top 8)
- Lil Rounds (Top 7 First & Second Week)
- Matt Giraud (Top 5)
- Danny Gokey (Top 4 to Top 3)
- Kris Allen (Finale): Winner

Season 9

- Haeley Vaughn (Women's Semifinals Weeks 1–2)
- Paige Miles (Women's Semifinals Week 3)
- Tim Urban (Men's Semifinals Week 1 – Top 7; tied for longest running VFTW pick with Jaydee Bixby; longest running ever American Idol pick)
- Siobhan Magnus (Top 6)
- Casey James (Top 5 – Top 3; Michael Lynche was originally picked, was switched to Casey after the performance night.)
- Lee DeWyze (Finale): Winner

Season 10

- Brett Loewenstern (Men's Semifinals)
- Rachel Zevita (Women's Semifinals)
- Paul McDonald (Top 13 to Top 8)
- Casey Abrams (Top 7 to Top 6)
- Jacob Lusk (Top 5)
- Haley Reinhart (Top 4 to Top 3)
- Scotty McCreery (Finale): Winner

Season 11

- Eben Franckewitz (Men's Semifinals)
- Haley Johnsen (Women's Semifinals)
- Shannon Magrane (Top 13 to Top 11)
- Heejun Han (Top 10 to Top 9)
- Deandre Brackensick (Top 8)
- Phillip Phillips (Top 7 to Finale): Winner

Season 12

- Zoanette Johnson (Women's Semifinals)
- Charlie Askew (Men's Semifinals)
- Lazaro Arbos (Top 10 to Top 6)
- Janelle Arthur (Top 5)
- Kree Harrison (Top 4 to Finale): Runner-Up

=== Canadian Idol ===
Season 3

- Cher Maendel
- Dave Moffatt
- Keely Hutton
- Jenn Beaupre
- Casey LeBlanc
- Suzi Rawn
- Rex Goudie: Season 3 Runner-Up

Season 4

- Chris Labelle
- Nancy Silverman
- Brandon Jones
- Chad Doucette
- Tyler Lewis
- Craig Sharpe: Season 4 Runner-Up

Season 5

- Tyler Mullendore
- Maud Coussa-Jandl
- Naomi-Joy Blackhall
- Annika Odegard
- Jaydee Bixby: Season 5 Runner-Up (tied for longest running pick)

Season 6

- Mark Day
- Mitch MacDonald: Season 6 Runner-Up

=== On the Lot ===
Season 1

- Kenny Luby

=== America's Got Talent ===
Season 2

- Boy Shakira

Season 5

- Airpocalypse (Quarterfinals Week 1)
- Ronith (Quarterfinals Week 2)
- Mary Ellen (Quarterfinals Week 4)
- PUP (Quarterfinals Week 5 "Youtube" Special)
- Doogie Horner (Quarterfinals Week 6 "Wildcard" Special)
- Prince Poppycock (Semi-finals Week 1 – Top 4)

Season 6

- Those Funny Little People (Quarterfinals Week 1)
- Thomas John (Quarterfinals Week 2)

Season 7

- Lil' Starr (Quarterfinals Week 1)

=== The Next Great American Band ===
Season 1

- Light of Doom

=== Clash of the Choirs ===
Season 1

- Team Lachey – Winners

=== America's Best Dance Crew ===
Season 2

- Fanny Pak

Season 3

- Dynamic Edition

Season 6

- ICONic Boyz

=== Dancing With The Stars ===
Season 5

- Marie Osmond and Jonathan Roberts

Season 7

- Cloris Leachman and Corky Ballas

Season 11

- Margaret Cho and Louis van Amstel
- Bristol Palin and Mark Ballas

=== I'm a Celebrity... Get Me Out of Here! ===
Season 2

- Heidi Montag and Spencer Pratt (quit before VFTW could cast any votes for them)
- Janice Dickinson

=== X Factor (UK) ===
Series 6

- John and Edward

Series 7

- Wagner

Series 8

- Johnny Robinson
- Frankie Cocozza (Cocozza was chosen following Robinson's elimination, but was removed from the show before the next public vote.)

=== X Factor (US) ===
Season 1

- Astro (Top 12 to Top 7)
- Chris Rene (Top 5 to Finale): Third Place

Season 2

- Tate Stevens (Top 4 to Finale): Winner

=== The Voice ===
Season 1

- Raquel Castro (Team Christina)
- Xenia (Team Blake)
- Devin Barley (Team Adam)
- Curtis Grimes (Team Cee-Lo)

Season 2

- RaeLynn (Team Blake)
- Erin Martin (Team Cee-Lo)
- Mathai (Team Adam)
- Tony Lucca (Team Adam)

== See also ==
- List of satirical magazines
- List of satirical news websites
- List of satirical television news programs
