= Stephanie Edwards =

Stephanie Edwards may refer to:

- Stephanie Edwards (television personality) (born 1943), longtime co-host of the Tournament of Roses Parade
- Stephanie Edwards (singer) (born 1987), American singer, contestant on TV show American Idol
- Sparkle (singer) (born Stephanie Edwards, born 1975), American singer
- Stephanie Edwards (Grey's Anatomy), a fictional character from the medical drama television series Grey's Anatomy
