= Antonella Barba =

American singer

- Born: Antonella Maria Barba; November 26, 1986 (age 39); Santa Monica, California, U.S.
- Education: Catholic University of America
- Occupation: Singer
- Years active: 2007–2018
- Musical career
- Instruments: Vocals; piano; violin
- Website: officialantonella.com

Antonella Maria Barba (born November 26, 1986) is an American singer. Born in Santa Monica, California and raised in Point Pleasant, New Jersey, Barba rose to prominence while competing on the sixth season of American Idol. She attracted media scrutiny after semi-nude photos of her were leaked online. The show was criticized for allowing Barba to continue to compete when producers had disqualified second season contestant Frenchie Davis under similar circumstances.

Eliminated after advancing to the top 16, Barba returned to Catholic University of America to complete a Bachelor of Science degree in architecture. She then worked as a spokesperson for the non-partisan organization ElectionMall before further pursuing a music career. She released original music and covers through her YouTube and SoundCloud accounts. Between 2011 and 2012, she was a singer for the Los Angeles rock band LA-eX, which included two Crazy Town members. She also contributed to a cover of John Lennon's "Imagine" (1971) for a 2014 UNICEF campaign, and appeared in a 2018 segment of Jimmy Kimmel Live!. Apart from her music career, she has acted in several short films, competed on Fear Factor, and played a minor role in the 2017 film All About the Money.

In December 2010, she was charged with two misdemeanors for shoplifting for which she served community service. She was arrested in October 2018 in Norfolk, Virginia, on a felony charge of distributing more than 100 grams (3.5 ounces) of heroin. In February 2019, she was indicted on 11 federal charges for possession of cocaine, heroin, and fentanyl and acting as a courier for a drug ring. Despite initially denying these charges, she pleaded guilty in July 2019 to distributing synthetic opioids, and was sentenced to three years and nine months in federal prison in November 2019.

== Life and career ==
=== 1986–2007: Early life and American Idol ===
Antonella Maria Barba was born on November 26, 1986, in Santa Monica, California, to Vincenzo and Valerie Barba. At the age of six, she moved with her parents to Point Pleasant, New Jersey. Barba began to play the violin at age four, and later learned the piano. She gave violin lessons to children in her neighborhood, and said that her middle school and high school classmates had referred to her as the "violin girl" based on her performances in talent shows. While attending Red Bank Catholic High School, Barba participated in choir for four years, was part of the school's doo-wop group, and took a music theory course as a senior. She went to Catholic University of America to study architecture; while attending university, she often sang with a friend from the musical theatre department.

At the age of 19, Barba tried out for the sixth season of American Idol with a high school friend in East Rutherford, New Jersey. For her audition, she performed Deniece Williams' 1976 single "Free". In later portions of the show, she went on to sing Aerosmith's "I Don't Want to Miss a Thing" (1998), Celine Dion's "Because You Loved Me" (1996), and Corinne Bailey Rae's "Put Your Records On" (2006). While participating on American Idol, Barba took a semester off from college. Her performances received largely negative responses from the show's judges, as well as television critics. However, she did receive some positive to mixed reviews. Though Rob Sheffield of the Rolling Stone considered Barba tone-deaf, he found her to be one of the more memorable contestants of the season. AllMusic's Stephen Thomas Erlewine said that Barba had "a plain, pleasant voice". Her fans referred to themselves as "Fantonellas". She was eliminated from the show after making it to the top 16; Sheffield questioned if the elimination had been rigged with her votes switched with those of fellow contestant Haley Scarnato.

American Idol Season 6 performances and results:
Week #	Song Choice	Original Artist	Result
Audition	"Free"	Deniece Williams	Advanced
Top 24 (12 Women)	"I Don't Want to Miss a Thing"	Aerosmith	Advanced
Top 20 (10 Women)	"Because You Loved Me"	Celine Dion	Advanced
Top 16 (8 Women)	"Put Your Records On"	Corinne Bailey Rae	Eliminated

While participating on the show, Barba came under media scrutiny when an anonymous source leaked semi-nude photos of her online. Images included her posing in a wet t-shirt at the National World War II Memorial and topless on a beach. She believed the photos had been stolen from her personal computer. Barba explained that they were "very personal and that is not how I intended to portray myself nor do I intend to portray myself that way in the future". She had informed producers about the images before the leak; she said that they tried to protect her from the backlash. Media outlets speculated that Barba was also featured in pornographic images, though this was later proven false. One of Barba's friends said that she had taken the photos to create a calendar for her boyfriend.

Following the leak, Barba's situation was compared to that of second season contestant Frenchie Davis, who had been disqualified when topless photos of her surfaced. Some viewers criticized the decision to allow Barba to continue on the show while Davis was dropped from it. Rosie O'Donnell believed that the different responses stemmed from racism and weightism, and civil-rights activist Najee Ali also felt there was a racial bias. Ali and Davis' manager held a protest at the Dolby Theatre, where American Idol was filmed, during the third week of the semi-finals. Davis said that she did not want Barba removed from the show, but advocated for the rules to be applied equally to all contestants; she also wanted the show to issue a public apology to her. Producers explained that the two were treated differently because Davis had been paid for her photos, while Barba had not.

Judges Simon Cowell, Paula Abdul, and Randy Jackson defended Barba, and host Ryan Seacrest criticized the source of the photos as immoral. Hugh Hefner dismissed the criticism of Barba based on the photos as "hypocritical and dumb". Following the leak, "Antonella Barba" was the most popular search term for the week of March 3, 2007. According to Time magazine, men in the 18 to 34 year old demographic group accounted for the largest number of visitors to the website hosting the images, in sharp contrast with American Idol's audience which was older and female. Vote for the Worst website creator Dave Della Terza referred to the incident as a "wake-up call" for young people to think about what they photograph and upload to social media. The website ran a campaign to keep Barba on the series.

=== 2007–2011: Music career and other activities ===
Following her elimination from American Idol, which she described as a "hectic" time, Barba received various modeling offers. In March 2007, Girls Gone Wild creator Joe Francis offered her $250,000 to host a video. The same month, she was approached by adult video distributor SugarDVD to become a spokesperson for $500,000. Barba denied reports that she had been offered a chance to pose nude for Playboy, and said if she were, she would refuse it. She also turned down an offer for a VH1 reality television program, a move that she regretted and called "pretty stupid".

She returned to Catholic University of America, where she graduated in 2008 with a Bachelor of Science degree. While attending the school, she took voice lessons to meet a liberal arts requirement. Remaining in Washington, D.C., she worked as an intern and later a spokesperson for the non-partisan organization ElectionMall. As part of her job, she encouraged young people to vote and run for political office. She helped to recruit young voters for the 2008 United States presidential election at a Republican Party event in San Francisco, California. At one point after graduating from university, she had also worked at a New York City architecture firm.

In 2009, Barba began work on a debut studio album, which she said would have a pop and R&B sound. During an interview, she said that she was going to collaborate with Focus... in Atlanta. During a trip to San Francisco, Barba had been approached by Focus...'s brother, and Focus... sent her beats as inspiration to write lyrics. He described the music as having a "hard pop edge", and said that he "want[ed] her to really sing". An Entertainment Weekly contributor wrote that she would have "an uphill battle when it comes to capturing the industry’s attention", though Barba said she was still recognized from her American Idol appearances. On December 1, 2009, she released "The Christmas Song" through the record label Arkatone Music Group Ltd.

In 2010, Barba began recording and releasing original music and covers through her YouTube account. On May 11, 2010, the single "Jersey Girl" was made available through the record label Seven Trumpets. It was promoted with a music video, uploaded to Barba's YouTube channel on February 8, 2011. She sang "Jersey Girl" on Good Day New York, with that performance included on her YouTube account on April 29, 2011. The follow-up song "Out for Blood" was made available on October 29, 2010, with a music video released on April 8, 2011. A nine-episode web series on the video's development was also uploaded to YouTube.

In December 2010, Barba was charged with two misdemeanors for shoplifting a pair of gloves from a Manhattan Urban Outfitters store; she was required to complete a day of community service.

=== 2011–2017: LA-eX and other music ventures ===
In 2011, Barba became a singer for the Los Angeles rock band LA-eX, which included Crazy Town members Epic Mazur and Kraig Tyler. Mazur and Tyler were the DJ and the guitarist, respectively. Barba said the group's name had multiple meanings, including a reference to how all three members were not native to Los Angeles. They classified their music as electro hip hop and disco. Between 2011 and 2012, the group released the original songs "We Give No Fuks", "Lipstick", "Make You Pop", and "So High". In 2012, they recorded a cover of Katy Perry's "Wide Awake" (2012), and a dubstep version of Kanye West's "Mercy" (2012). Susan Peters, writing for RyanSeacrest.com praised their cover of "Mercy", highlighting Barba's rapping and the "raw female power" she brings to the song. During a December 2011 interview, Barba announced that an extended play release was being prepared and live performances planned. Peters said their EP, So High, was expected for a July 2012 release.

She competed in a 2012 episode of Fear Factor, with the co-owner of her singing telegram business. On August 23, 2014, Barba performed Frank Ocean's "Thinkin Bout You" (2012) at the University of California, Los Angeles, for the LEAP Foundation at the request of Dr. Bill Dorfman. In November of the same year, she participated in a sing-along cover of John Lennon's "Imagine" (1971) as part of a UNICEF campaign. She was one of several artists who sang a line from the song, and appeared in the music video used to promote the project. In 2014, Barba also played the violin on Timothy Bloom's self-titled studio album.

The following year, Barba's SoundCloud account included the original songs: "Do To Me", "Cocaine HeartBreak", "Girl For A Day", and "Would You Still Love Me?". Bridget Kelly had recorded "Cocaine HeartBreak" for her EP Cut to... Bridget Kelly (2013) under the title "Coca1n3 Heartbreak"; Barba was credited as a co-writer of the song. Barba self-released the song "Santa" on December 7, 2015, with a music video uploaded to her YouTube account on December 19, 2016. Along with pursuing her music career, Barba appeared in various short films, and had a small part in the 2017 film All About the Money.

=== 2018–present: Continued work and arrests ===
In February 2018, Barba posted on her Twitter account that she was producing an R. Kelly song; the tweet included an image of her playing the violin while accompanied by a keyboardist and a bass violin player. On May 21, 2018, Barba appeared on Jimmy Kimmel Live! as part of a "Where are They Now" segment with other past American Idol contestants. For the bit, each person sang about their current occupation in a song, which was compared to "We Are the World" (1985). Since 2013, she has performed "The Star-Spangled Banner" for the Los Angeles Dodgers for five consecutive years. As of early 2019, she has not released an album, and her official website is still "under construction".

On October 11, 2018, Barba was arrested in Norfolk, Virginia, on a felony charge of distributing more than 100 grams (3.5 ounces) of heroin. At the time, she was traveling in a rented car and was in Norfolk during a layover on a flight to Miami, Florida, to attend a recording session. Barba denied the charges through statements from her criminal defense lawyer. Her attorney said that she had been unaware the drug was in the vehicle. She had been living in Los Angeles at the time of her arrest.

Barba was indicted and arrested on 11 federal charges, including "conspiracy to distribute and possess cocaine, heroin, and fentanyl with the intent to distribute and 10 counts of distribution or possession of cocaine, heroin and fentanyl with the intent to distribute". She was accused of acting as a courier for a drug ring. According to the indictment, she has been connected to a Hampton Roads "drug conspiracy" that took place in 2017 and 2018. The report claims Barba was in the process of trafficking 830 grams (29 ounces) of fentanyl when she was arrested. According to The Virginian-Pilot, she also has an ongoing felony case involving marijuana in Kansas.

In July 2019, Barba pleaded guilty to distributing synthetic opioids, and was sentenced to three years and nine months in federal prison in November. According to court documents, Barba said she was only involved in a single delivery, and was unaware of the extent of the drug conspiracy or what she was delivering. Barba's mother and legal team described her elimination from American Idol and her subsequent move to Los Angeles as leading to a "detrimental change" in her life. Court documents showed that Barba had been diagnosed with bipolar disorder, anxiety disorder, and narcissistic personality disorder, and treats them with medication and therapy. Barba was arrested again on March 30, 2025 on a domestic violence charge. She was released on condition of home detention, and prevented from having any contact with her ex-partner.

== Discography ==
=== Songs ===
Title	Year
"The Christmas Song"	2009
"Jersey Girl"	2010
"Out for Blood"	2010
"Do to Me"	2015
"Cocaine HeartBreak"	2015
"Girl for a Day"	2015
"Would You Still Love Me?"	2015
"Santa"	2015

== Filmography ==
Year	Show	Role	Notes
2007	American Idol	Herself (semi-finalist)	Season 6
2008	Fear Factor	Herself (contestant)	Episode: "Roach Coach"
2017	All About the Money	Jessica	
2018	Jimmy Kimmel Live!	Herself	

== Sources ==
- Deller, Ruth A. (2012). "Gender Performance in American Idol, Pop Idol, and The X Factor". In Zwaan, Koos; de Bruin, Joost (eds.). Adapting Idols: Authenticity, Identity and Performance in a Global Television Format. Surrey: Ashgate Publishing. pp. 181–194. ISBN 978-1-4094-4169-4.
