= American Idol season 6 =

American Idol
- Season 6
- Hosted by: Ryan Seacrest
- Judges: Paula Abdul; Simon Cowell; Randy Jackson
- Winner: Jordin Sparks
- Runner-up: Blake Lewis
- Finals venue: Kodak Theatre

Release
- Original network: Fox
- Original release: January 16 – May 23, 2007

Season chronology
- ← Previous; Season 5 Next → Season 7

The sixth season of American Idol premiered on the Fox Broadcasting Company as a two-night, four-hour premiere special on January 16 and 17, and ran until May 23, 2007. Simon Cowell, Paula Abdul, and Randy Jackson returned as judges, and Ryan Seacrest returned as host. A record of 74 million votes were cast in the finale round, and a record 609 million votes were cast in the entire season. Jordin Sparks won the competition, while Blake Lewis was the runner-up. This is the first season not to be syndicated under the Rewind package.

== Regional auditions ==
Contestants were required to be between the ages 16 and 28 on August 6, 2006. Guest judges were used for auditions this season.

- Jewel, Minneapolis auditions
- Carole Bayer Sager, New York auditions
- Olivia Newton-John, Los Angeles auditions

Auditions were held in the following cities:

American Idol (season 6) – regional auditions
City	Preliminary date	Preliminary venue	Filming date(s)	Filming venue	Golden tickets
Los Angeles, California	August 6, 2006	Rose Bowl, Pasadena	September 26, 2006	Millennium Biltmore Hotel	40
San Antonio, Texas	August 11, 2006	Alamodome	August 26, 2006	Henry B. González Convention Center	24
New York City, New York	August 14, 2006	Continental Airlines Arena, East Rutherford	August 30, 2006	Chelsea Piers	35
Birmingham, Alabama	August 21, 2006	Birmingham–Jefferson Convention Complex	September 29–30, 2006	Sheraton Hotel	20
Memphis, Tennessee	September 3, 2006	FedExForum	October 5–6, 2006	Memphis Cook Convention Center	22
Minneapolis, Minnesota	September 8, 2006	Target Center	September 12, 2006	Minneapolis Convention Center	17
Seattle, Washington	September 19, 2006	KeyArena	October 2–3, 2006	W Hotel	14
Total number of tickets to Hollywood					172

Jordin Sparks, this season's winner, originally failed to pass through her audition in Los Angeles, but later landed an audition in Seattle as a reward for winning a local Fox-affiliate-sponsored contest called Arizona Idol.

== Hollywood week ==
The Hollywood rounds of the audition process were held over four days in November 2006 at the Orpheum Theatre in Los Angeles. The first round consisted of each contestant singing one song a cappella in front of the judges. Contestants were then told whether they were moving on or going home in groups of six. This extended over the first two days.

The second round took place on the second and third days, and consisted of groups of three or four contestants rehearsing and then performing one of nine pre-selected songs. Groups were reviewed and contestants were then judged individually as to whether they were moving on or going home. The third round took place on the fourth day, where each contestant performed one song from a pre-selected list accompanied by a piano and backup singers. Contestants were again informed of whether they had made the cut or not.

The final round took place at the Pasadena Civic Center on January 14–15, 2007, just before the regional audition shows began airing. Without any further auditioning, the 40 remaining contestants were reduced to 24. In a process taking a whole day, contestants waited in a sitting room until, one by one, they went up to the center's Gold Room. The three judges told them whether they had made it onto the stage show or were cut. The 24 semifinalists were announced on February 14, 2007.

== Semifinals ==
The live show portion of the semifinals began on February 20, 2007, with the names announced on February 14. Starting with 12 women and 12 men, the women and men performed weekly on separate shows and on the result show, the bottom two male and two female contestants were eliminated. The semifinals took place over three weeks, leaving the other six to form the top 12. The females performed on the first night, followed by the males the next night.

Color key:

This contestant was saved by the public vote.
This contestant was eliminated.

=== Top 24 (February 20 & 21) ===
Contestants are listed in the order they performed.

Top 24 (Female contestants)
Contestant	Song	Result
Stephanie Edwards	"How Come U Don't Call Me Anymore?"	Safe
Amy Krebs	"I Can't Make You Love Me"	Eliminated
Leslie Hunt	"(You Make Me Feel Like) A Natural Woman"	Safe
Sabrina Sloan	"I Never Loved a Man (The Way I Love You)"	Safe
Antonella Barba	"I Don't Want to Miss a Thing"	Safe
Jordin Sparks	"Give Me One Reason"	Safe
Nicole Tranquillo	"Stay"	Eliminated
Haley Scarnato	"It's All Coming Back to Me Now"	Safe
Melinda Doolittle	"(Sweet Sweet Baby) Since You've Been Gone"	Safe
Alaina Alexander	"Brass in Pocket"	Safe
Gina Glocksen	"All by Myself"	Safe
LaKisha Jones	"And I Am Telling You I'm Not Going"	Safe

Top 24 (Male contestants)
Contestant	Song	Result
Rudy Cardenas	"Free Ride"	Eliminated
Brandon Rogers	"Rock with You"	Safe
Sundance Head	"Nights in White Satin"	Safe
Paul Kim	"Careless Whisper"	Eliminated
Chris Richardson	"I Don't Want to Be"	Safe
Nick Pedro	"Now and Forever"	Safe
Blake Lewis	"Somewhere Only We Know"	Safe
Sanjaya Malakar	"Knocks Me Off My Feet"	Safe
Chris Sligh	"Typical"	Safe
Jared Cotter	"Back at One"	Safe
A. J. Tabaldo	"Never Too Much"	Safe
Phil Stacey	"I Could Not Ask for More"	Safe

Non-competition performances
Performers	Song
Top 24	"Sowing the Seeds of Love"
Fantasia	"I'm Here"

=== Top 20 (February 27 & 28) ===
Contestants are listed in the order they performed.

Top 20 (Female contestants)
Contestant	Song	Result
Gina Glocksen	"Alone"	Safe
Alaina Alexander	"Not Ready to Make Nice"	Eliminated
LaKisha Jones	"Midnight Train to Georgia"	Safe
Melinda Doolittle	"My Funny Valentine"	Safe
Antonella Barba	"Because You Loved Me"	Safe
Jordin Sparks	"Reflection"	Safe
Stephanie Edwards	"Dangerously in Love"	Safe
Leslie Hunt	"Feeling Good"	Eliminated
Haley Scarnato	"Queen of the Night"	Safe
Sabrina Sloan	"All the Man That I Need"	Safe

Top 20 (Male contestants)
Contestant	Song	Result
Phil Stacey	"Missing You"	Safe
Jared Cotter	"Let's Get It On"	Safe
A. J. Tabaldo	"Feeling Good"	Eliminated
Sanjaya Malakar	"Steppin' Out with My Baby"	Safe
Chris Sligh	"Trouble"	Safe
Nick Pedro	"Fever"	Eliminated
Blake Lewis	"Virtual Insanity"	Safe
Brandon Rogers	"Time After Time"	Safe
Chris Richardson	"Geek in the Pink"	Safe
Sundance Head	"Mustang Sally"	Safe

Non-competition performances
Performers	Song
Top 20	"Joy to the World"
Kellie Pickler	"I Wonder"

=== Top 16 (March 6 & 7) ===
Contestants are listed in the order they performed.

Top 16 (Female contestants)
Contestant	Song	Result
Jordin Sparks	"Heartbreaker"	Safe
Sabrina Sloan	"Don't Let Go (Love)"	Eliminated
Antonella Barba	"Put Your Records On"	Eliminated
Haley Scarnato	"If My Heart Had Wings"	Safe
Stephanie Edwards	"Sweet Thing"	Safe
LaKisha Jones	"I Have Nothing"	Safe
Gina Glocksen	"Call Me When You're Sober"	Safe
Melinda Doolittle	"I'm a Woman"	Safe

Top 16 (Male contestants)
Contestant	Song	Result
Blake Lewis	"All Mixed Up"	Safe
Sanjaya Malakar	"Waiting on the World to Change"	Safe
Sundance Head	"Jeremy"	Eliminated
Chris Richardson	"Tonight I Wanna Cry"	Safe
Jared Cotter	"If You Really Love Me"	Eliminated
Brandon Rogers	"I Just Want to Celebrate"	Safe
Phil Stacey	"I Need You"	Safe
Chris Sligh	"Wanna Be Loved"	Safe

Non-competition performances
Performers	Song
Top 16	"Stuck in the Middle with You"
Carrie Underwood	"Wasted"

== Top 12 contestants ==
The top 12 contestants were announced on March 8, 2007. As in past years, the top 12 appeared on the annual compilation album while the top 10 participated in the American Idol summer concert tour. Also as in past years, one contestant was eliminated every week, with the exception of the April 25 show, when all contestants were declared safe. As a result, two of the contestants were eliminated on the May 2 results program.

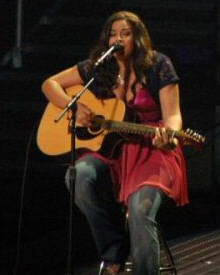
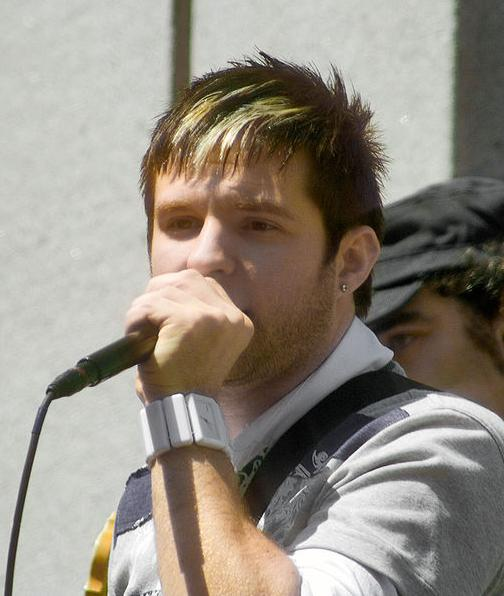
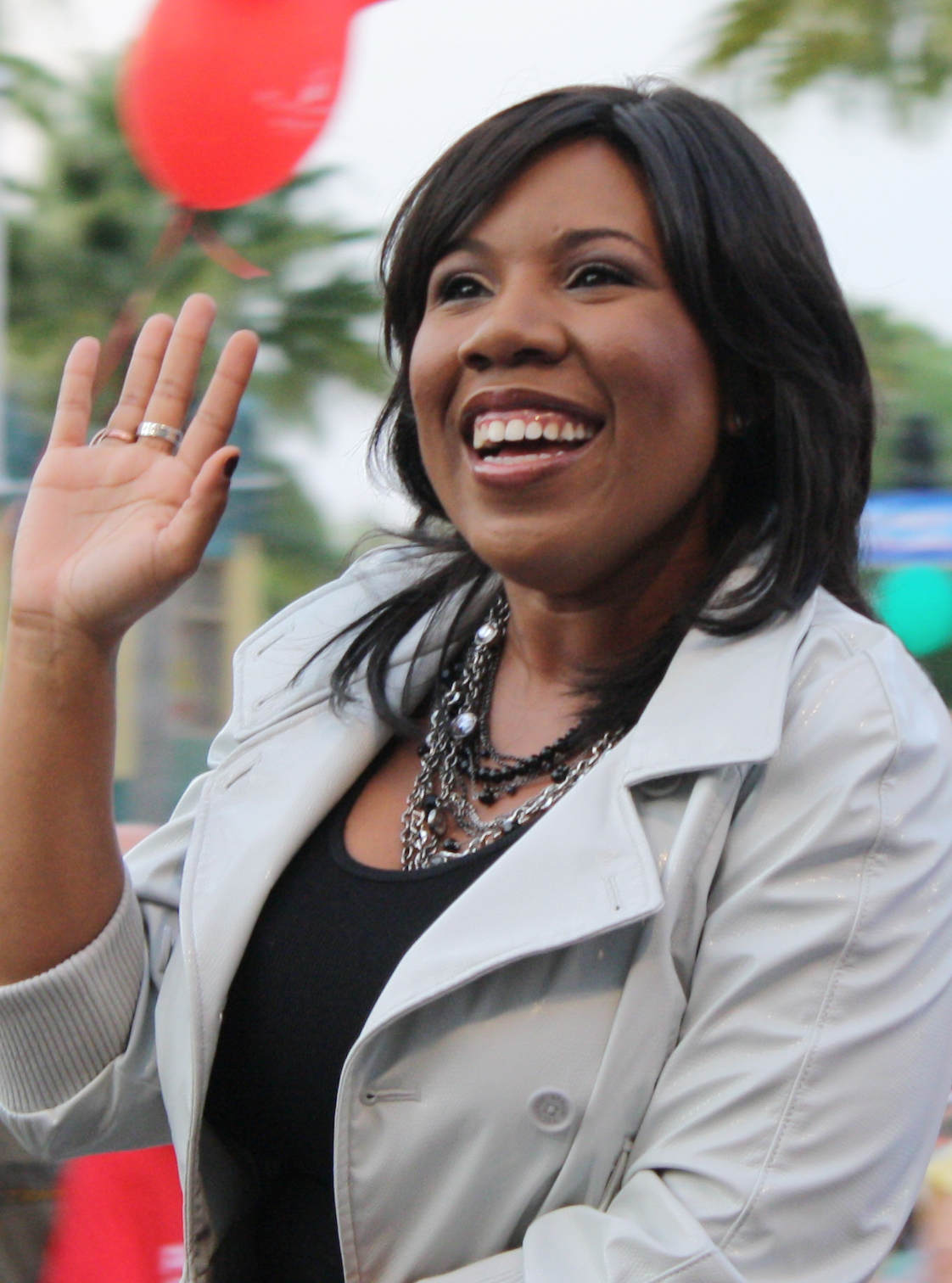
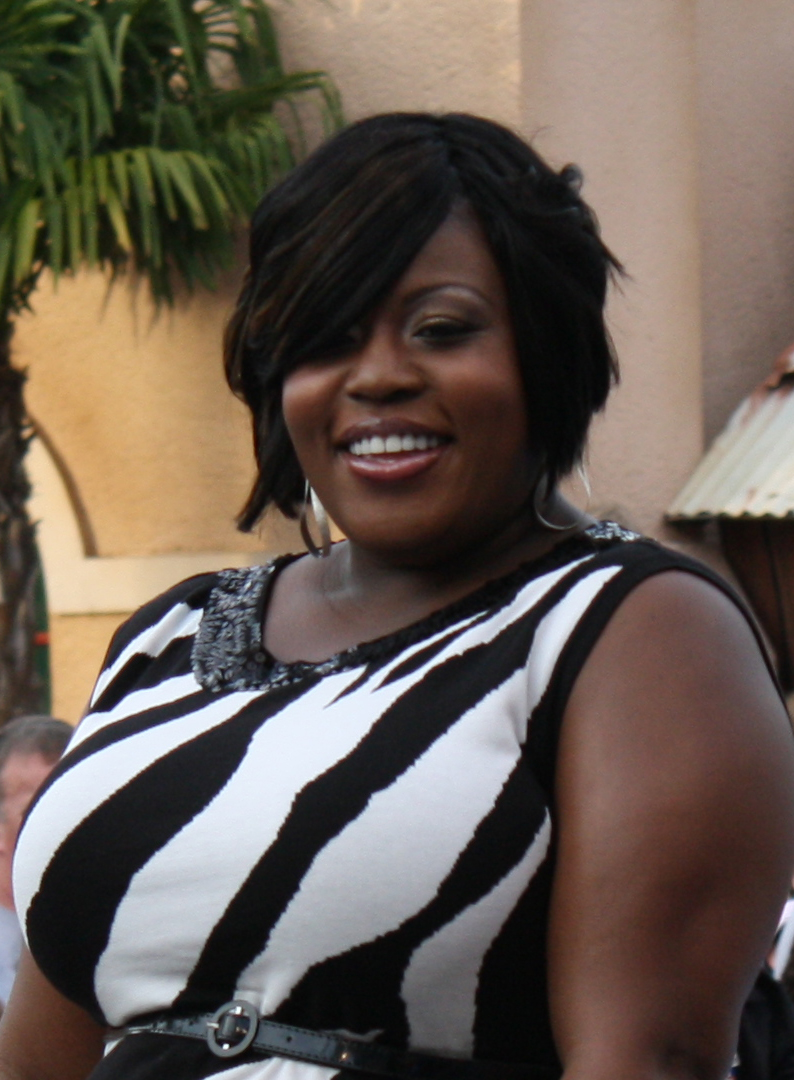
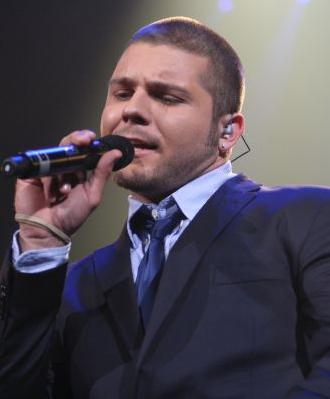
From left to right: Jordin Sparks, Blake Lewis, Melinda Doolittle, LaKisha Jones, and Chris Richardson
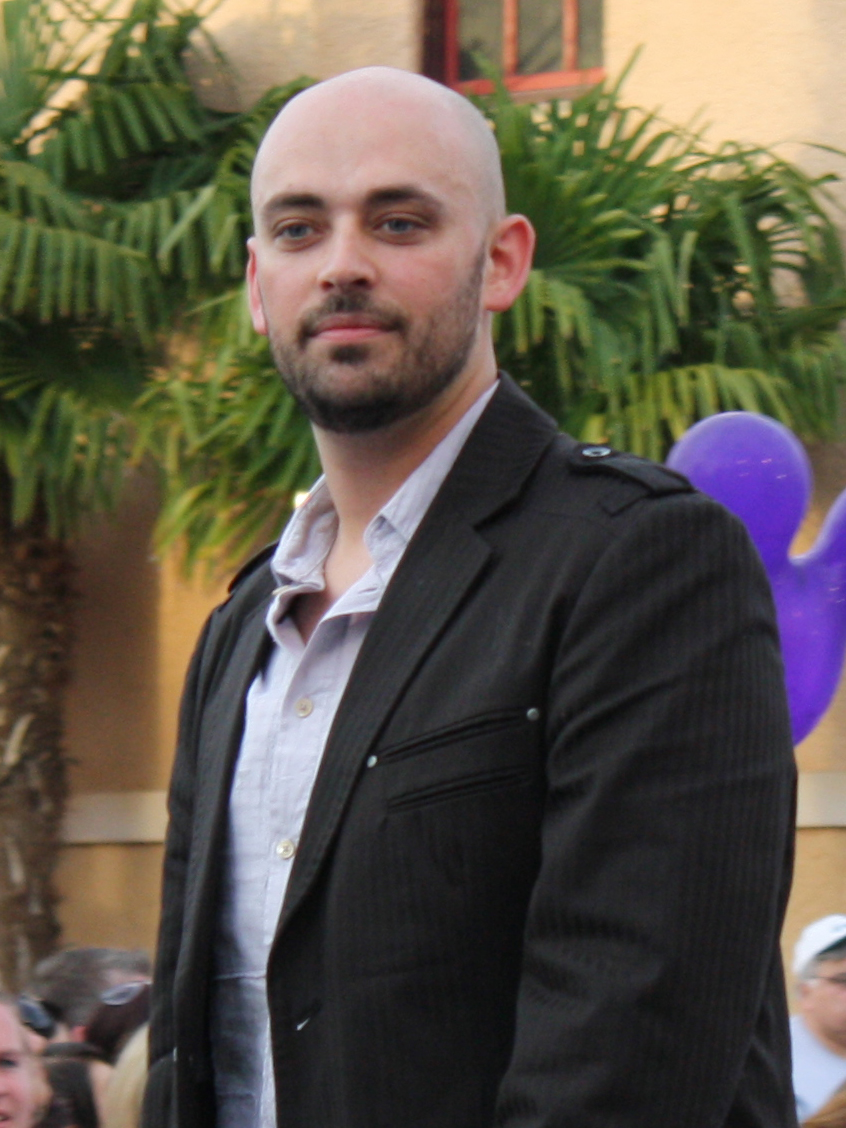
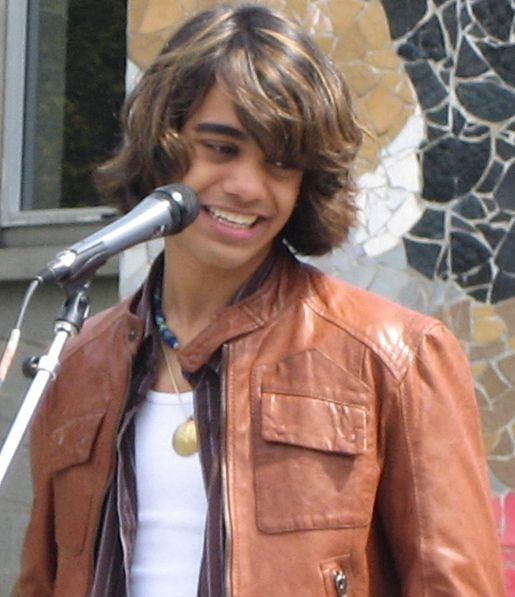
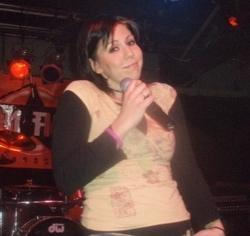
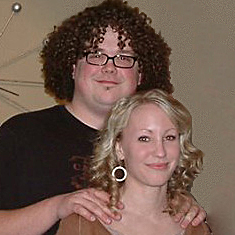
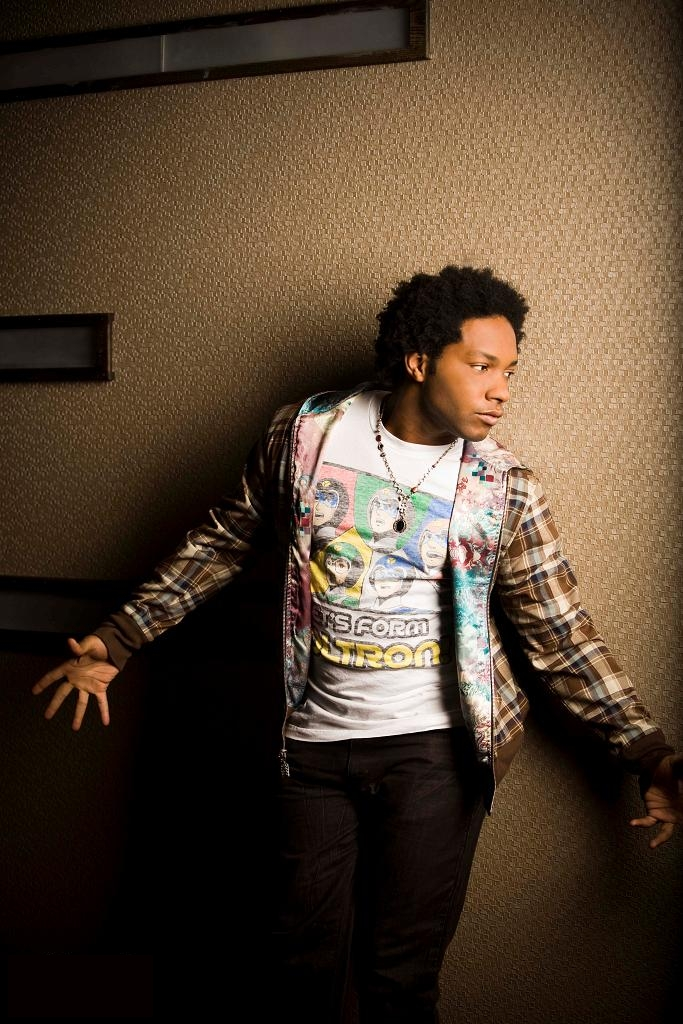
From left to right: Phil Stacey, Sanjaya Malakar, Gina Glocksen, Chris Sligh, and Brandon Rogers
- Jordin Sparks (17 at the time of the show) was from Glendale, Arizona, and auditioned in Seattle. She is the daughter of former NFL defensive back Philippi Sparks.
- Blake Lewis (25 at the time of the show) was from Bothell, Washington, and auditioned in Seattle. Claiming to be the city's beatboxing champion, Lewis sampled a hip-hop tune to the judges before rendering Seal's "Crazy." He passed the auditions, but Simon commented to him: "you are not as good as you think you are."
- Melinda Doolittle (29 at the time of the show) was from Brentwood, Tennessee, and auditioned in Memphis. She auditioned with "For Once in My Life" by Stevie Wonder and was met with universal praise from the three judges on her vocal ability.
- LaKisha Jones (27 at the time of the show) was from Flint, Michigan, and she performed "Think" by Aretha Franklin at her audition in New York.
- Chris Richardson (23 at the time of the show) was from Chesapeake, Virginia, and auditioned in New York with Leon Russell's "A Song for You." During Richardson's audition, Randy Jackson compared him to Justin Timberlake.
- Phil Stacey (29 at the time of the show) was from Jacksonville, Florida, and auditioned in Memphis. He missed the birth of his daughter to audition. He performed two songs before going through to Hollywood: "My Girl" and "Let's Get It On."
- Sanjaya Malakar (17 at the time of the show) was from Federal Way, Washington, and auditioned in Seattle with his sister Shyamali, singing "Signed, Sealed, Delivered I'm Yours." Simon commented that he had a better voice than his sister. Both made it to Hollywood, but Sanjaya was shown tearfully embracing his sister when he made it to the top 40 in Hollywood and she did not.
- Haley Scarnato (24 at the time of the show) was from San Antonio, Texas and sang "I Can't Make You Love Me" by Bonnie Raitt during her audition.
- Gina Glocksen (22 at the time of the show) was from Naperville, Illinois, and auditioned in Memphis. She originally auditioned in the fifth season and made it to Hollywood, but she was cut before the top 40.
- Chris Sligh (28 at the time of the show) was from Greenville, South Carolina, and auditioned in Birmingham with "Kiss from a Rose" by Seal, after which Paula Abdul gave him a standing ovation saying, "I like you very much."
- Stephanie Edwards (19 at the time of the show) was from Savannah, Georgia, and auditioned in Memphis.
- Brandon Rogers (29 at the time of the show) was from North Hollywood, California, and auditioned in Los Angeles. After hearing his audition, the judges, including guest judge Olivia Newton-John, were impressed with his vocals. Simon Cowell later mentioned he was the best audition in Los Angeles.

== Finals ==
There were eleven weeks of finals with twelve contestants competing. One contestant was eliminated every week based on the public's votes, with the exception of the top 6 week, where one week featured a non-elimination and the following week a double-elimination.

Color key:

This contestant was saved by the public vote.
This contestant was in the top three.
This contestant was in the bottom two or three, but was saved by the public vote.
This contestant was eliminated.
This contestant won American Idol.
This contestant was the runner-up.

=== Top 12 – Diana Ross (March 15) ===
Diana Ross served as a guest mentor this week. Contestants performed one song each from her discography and are listed in the order they performed.

Contestant	Diana Ross song	Result
Brandon Rogers	"You Can't Hurry Love"	Eliminated
Melinda Doolittle	"Home"	Safe
Chris Sligh	"Endless Love"	Safe
Gina Glocksen	"Love Child"	Safe
Sanjaya Malakar	"Ain't No Mountain High Enough"	Bottom two
Haley Scarnato	"Missing You"	Safe
Phil Stacey	"I'm Gonna Make You Love Me"	Bottom three
LaKisha Jones	"God Bless the Child"	Safe
Blake Lewis	"You Keep Me Hangin' On"	Safe
Stephanie Edwards	"Love Hangover"	Safe
Chris Richardson	"The Boss"	Safe
Jordin Sparks	"If We Hold on Together"	Safe

Non-competition performances
Performers	Song
Top 12	"Where Did Our Love Go" "Baby Love" "Stop! In the Name of Love"
Diana Ross	"More Today Than Yesterday"

=== Top 11 – British Invasion (March 24) ===
British singers Peter Noone and Lulu served as guest mentors this week, with the former mentoring the men and the latter mentoring the women. Contestants are listed in the order they performed.

Contestant	Song	Result
Haley Scarnato	"Tell Him"	Safe
Chris Richardson	"Don't Let the Sun Catch You Crying"	Bottom two
Stephanie Edwards	"You Don't Have to Say You Love Me"	Eliminated
Blake Lewis	"Time of the Season"	Safe
LaKisha Jones	"Diamonds Are Forever"	Safe
Phil Stacey	"Tobacco Road"	Safe
Jordin Sparks	"I (Who Have Nothing)"	Safe
Sanjaya Malakar	"You Really Got Me"	Safe
Gina Glocksen	"Paint It Black"	Safe
Chris Sligh	"She's Not There"	Safe
Melinda Doolittle	"As Long as He Needs Me"	Safe

Non-competition performances
Performers	Song
Peter Noone	"There's a Kind of Hush"
Lulu	"To Sir with Love"

=== Top 10 – Gwen Stefani (March 31) ===
Gwen Stefani was a guest mentor for the week. Contestants performed songs from her discography or songs that inspired her, and are listed in the order they performed.

Contestant	Song	Result
LaKisha Jones	"Last Dance"	Safe
Chris Sligh	"Every Little Thing She Does Is Magic"	Eliminated
Gina Glocksen	"I'll Stand by You"	Safe
Sanjaya Malakar	"Bathwater"	Safe
Haley Scarnato	"True Colors"	Bottom two
Phil Stacey	"Every Breath You Take"	Bottom three
Melinda Doolittle	"Heaven Knows"	Safe
Blake Lewis	"Lovesong"	Safe
Jordin Sparks	"Hey Baby"	Safe
Chris Richardson	"Don't Speak"	Safe

Non-competition performance
Performers	Song
Gwen Stefani and Akon	"The Sweet Escape"

=== Top 9 – American classics (April 6) ===
Tony Bennett served as a guest mentor this week. Contestants are listed in the order they performed.

Contestant	Song	Result
Blake Lewis	"Mack the Knife"	Safe
Phil Stacey	"Night and Day"	Bottom three
Melinda Doolittle	"I Got Rhythm"	Top three
Chris Richardson	"Don't Get Around Much Anymore"	Safe
Jordin Sparks	"On a Clear Day You Can See Forever"	Top three
Gina Glocksen	"Smile"	Eliminated
Sanjaya Malakar	"Cheek to Cheek"	Safe
Haley Scarnato	"Ain't Misbehavin"	Bottom two
LaKisha Jones	"Stormy Weather"	Top three

Non-competition performance
Performers	Song
Michael Bublé	"Call Me Irresponsible"

=== Top 8 – Latin (April 11) ===
Jennifer Lopez served as a guest mentor this week. Contestants are listed in the order they performed.

Contestant	Latin song	Result
Melinda Doolittle	"Sway"	Safe
LaKisha Jones	"Conga"	Safe
Chris Richardson	"Smooth"	Bottom three
Haley Scarnato	"Turn the Beat Around"	Eliminated
Phil Stacey	"Maria Maria"	Bottom two
Jordin Sparks	"Rhythm Is Gonna Get You"	Safe
Blake Lewis	"I Need to Know"	Safe
Sanjaya Malakar	"Bésame Mucho"	Safe

Non-competition performances
Performers	Song
Top 8	"Bailamos"
Akon	"Don't Matter"
Jennifer Lopez	"Qué Hiciste"

=== Top 7 – Country (April 18) ===
Martina McBride served as a guest mentor this week. Contestants are listed in the order they performed.

Contestant	Country song	Result
Phil Stacey	"Where the Blacktop Ends"	Safe
Jordin Sparks	"A Broken Wing"	Safe
Sanjaya Malakar	"Something to Talk About"	Eliminated
LaKisha Jones	"Jesus, Take the Wheel"	Bottom two
Chris Richardson	"Mayberry"	Safe
Melinda Doolittle	"Trouble Is a Woman"	Safe
Blake Lewis	"When the Stars Go Blue"	Bottom three

Non-competition performances
Performers	Song
Top 7	"I'm Alright"
Fergie	"Big Girls Don't Cry"
Martina McBride	"Anyway"

=== Top 6 (Idol Gives Back) – Inspirational songs (April 25) ===
Owing to a special theme week – Idol Gives Back – Ryan Seacrest announced that this week would be a non-elimination, and that the votes cast for this week would be combined with the votes from the following week. Contestants are listed in the order they performed.

Contestant	Song	Result
Chris Richardson	"Change the World"	Safe
Melinda Doolittle	"There Will Come a Day"	Safe
Blake Lewis	"Imagine"	Safe
LaKisha Jones	"I Believe"	Safe
Phil Stacey	"The Change"	Safe
Jordin Sparks	"You'll Never Walk Alone"	Safe

=== Top 6 – Bon Jovi (May 2) ===
Jon Bon Jovi and David Bryan served as guest mentors this week. Contestants performed one song from the Bon Jovi discography, and are listed in the order they performed. Two contestants were eliminated based on the combined votes from last week and this week.

Contestant	Bon Jovi song	Result
Phil Stacey	"Blaze of Glory"	Eliminated
Jordin Sparks	"Livin' on a Prayer"	Safe
LaKisha Jones	"This Ain't a Love Song"	Safe
Blake Lewis	"You Give Love a Bad Name"	Safe
Chris Richardson	"Wanted Dead or Alive"	Eliminated
Melinda Doolittle	"Have a Nice Day"	Safe

Non-competition performances
Performers	Song
Robin Thicke	"Lost Without U"
Bon Jovi	"(You Want to) Make a Memory"

=== Top 4 – Bee Gees (May 9) ===
Barry Gibb served as a guest mentor this week. Contestants performed two songs each from the Bee Gees discography and are listed in the order they performed.

Contestant	Order	Bee Gees song	Result
Melinda Doolittle	1	"Love You Inside Out"	Safe
Melinda Doolittle	5	"How Can You Mend a Broken Heart"	Safe
Blake Lewis	2	"You Should Be Dancing"	Safe
Blake Lewis	6	"This Is Where I Came In"	Safe
LaKisha Jones	3	"Stayin' Alive"	Eliminated
LaKisha Jones	7	"Run to Me"	Eliminated
Jordin Sparks	4	"To Love Somebody"	Safe
Jordin Sparks	8	"Woman in Love"	Safe

Non-competition performances
Performers	Song
Top 4	Bee Gees medley
Pink	"Who Knew"
Barry Gibb	"To Love Somebody"

=== Top 3 (May 16) ===
Each contestant performed three songs: one chosen by one of the judges, one chosen by the producers, and one chosen by themselves. Contestants are listed in the order they performed.

Contestant	Order	Song	Result
Jordin Sparks	1	"Wishing on a Star" (Note: Song chosen by Simon Cowell)	Safe
Jordin Sparks	4	"She Works Hard for the Money"	Safe
Jordin Sparks	7	"I (Who Have Nothing)"	Safe
Blake Lewis	2	"Roxanne" (Note: Song chosen by Paula Abdul)	Safe
Blake Lewis	5	"This Love"	Safe
Blake Lewis	8	"When I Get You Alone"	Safe
Melinda Doolittle	3	"I Believe in You and Me" (Note: Song chosen by Randy Jackson)	Eliminated
Melinda Doolittle	6	"Nutbush City Limits"	Eliminated
Melinda Doolittle	9	"I'm a Woman"	Eliminated

Non-competition performances
Performers	Song
Elliott Yamin	"Wait for You"
Maroon 5	"Makes Me Wonder"

=== Top 2 – Finale (May 23) ===
Each contestant performed three songs, and contestants are listed in the order they performed. Blake Lewis won the coin toss and chose to perform first.

Contestant	Order	Song	Result
Blake Lewis	1	"You Give Love a Bad Name"	Runner-Up
Blake Lewis	3	"She Will Be Loved"	Runner-Up
Blake Lewis	5	"This Is My Now"	Runner-Up
Jordin Sparks	2	"Fighter"	Winner
Jordin Sparks	4	"A Broken Wing"	Winner
Jordin Sparks	6	"This Is My Now"	Winner

Non-competition performance
Performers	Song
Daughtry	"Home" (Note: Performed on the May 22 episode.)
Jordin Sparks and Blake Lewis	"I Saw Her Standing There"
Gwen Stefani	"4 in the Morning"
Kelly Clarkson	"Never Again"
Blake Lewis, Chris Richardson, Phil Stacey, Sanjaya Malakar, Chris Sligh and Brandon Rogers with Smokey Robinson	"Ooo Baby Baby" "Being with You" "The Tears of a Clown"
Blake Lewis with Doug E. Fresh	"The Show"
Jordin Sparks, Melinda Doolittle, LaKisha Jones, Haley Scarnato, Gina Glocksen and Stephanie Edwards with Gladys Knight	"I Heard It Through the Grapevine" "I Feel a Song (In My Heart)" "Midnight Train to Georgia"
Tony Bennett	"For Once in My Life"
Melinda Doolittle with BeBe and CeCe Winans	"Hold Up the Light"
Top 12	"Time After Time"
Carrie Underwood	"I'll Stand by You"
African Children's Choir	
Sanjaya Malakar with Joe Perry	"You Really Got Me"
Green Day	"Working Class Hero"
Taylor Hicks	"Heaven Knows"
Jordin Sparks and Ruben Studdard	"You're All I Need to Get By"
Bette Midler	"Wind Beneath My Wings"
Top 12 with Kelly Clarkson, Taylor Hicks, Ruben Studdard, and Carrie Underwood	"Sgt. Pepper's Lonely Hearts Club Band" "A Day in the Life" "She's Leaving Home" "Lucy in the Sky with Diamonds" "With a Little Help from My Friends"
Jordin Sparks	"This Is My Now"

The finale aired on May 23, 2007, live from the Kodak Theatre in Los Angeles. Every past winner of American Idol gave a special performance except for Fantasia, who was appearing in The Color Purple in New York City and was thus unavailable.

After Carrie Underwood performed "I'll Stand by You", Clive Davis gave a speech extolling the state of "the American Idol album franchise," and then presented Underwood with a special award for achieving 6 million U.S. album sales for her album Some Hearts.

== Elimination chart ==
Color key:

Winner
Runner-up
Saved by the public
Top two
Bottom two or three
Eliminated

American Idol (season 6) - Eliminations
Contestant	Pl.	Semifinals			Top 12	Top 11	Top 10	Top 9	Top 8	Top 7	Top 6		Top 4	Top 3	Finale
Contestant	Pl.	2/22	3/1	3/8	3/15	3/24	3/31	4/6	4/11	4/18	4/25 (Note: There was no elimination on April 25, as the week held a Idol Gives Back telethon performance. Votes from this week carried into the following week, where the two contestants with the fewest combined votes were eliminated.)	5/2	5/9	5/16	5/23
Jordin Sparks	1	Safe	Safe	Safe	Safe	Safe	Safe	Top three	Safe	Safe	Safe	Safe	Safe	Safe	Winner
Blake Lewis	2	Safe	Safe	Safe	Safe	Safe	Safe	Safe	Safe	Bottom three	Safe	Safe	Safe	Safe	Runner-up
Melinda Doolittle	3	Safe	Safe	Safe	Safe	Safe	Safe	Top three	Safe	Safe	Safe	Safe	Safe	Eliminated	
LaKisha Jones	4	Safe	Safe	Safe	Safe	Safe	Safe	Top three	Safe	Bottom two	Safe	Safe	Eliminated		
Chris Richardson	5	Safe	Safe	Safe	Safe	Bottom two	Safe	Safe	Bottom three	Safe	Safe	Eliminated			
Phil Stacey	5	Safe	Safe	Safe	Bottom three	Safe	Bottom three	Bottom three	Bottom two	Safe	Safe	Eliminated			
Sanjaya Malakar	7	Safe	Safe	Safe	Bottom two	Safe	Safe	Safe	Safe	Eliminated					
Haley Scarnato	8	Safe	Safe	Safe	Safe	Safe	Bottom two	Bottom two	Eliminated						
Gina Glocksen	9	Safe	Safe	Safe	Safe	Safe	Safe	Eliminated							
Chris Sligh	10	Safe	Safe	Safe	Safe	Safe	Eliminated								
Stephanie Edwards	11	Safe	Safe	Safe	Safe	Eliminated									
Brandon Rogers	12	Safe	Safe	Safe	Eliminated										
Antonella Barba		Safe	Safe	Eliminated											
Jared Cotter		Safe	Safe	Eliminated											
Sundance Head		Safe	Safe	Eliminated											
Sabrina Sloan		Safe	Safe	Eliminated											
Alaina Alexander		Safe	Eliminated												
Leslie Hunt		Safe	Eliminated												
Nicholas Pedro		Safe	Eliminated												
A.J. Tabaldo		Safe	Eliminated												
Rudy Cardenas		Eliminated													
Paul Kim		Eliminated													
Amy Krebs		Eliminated													
Nicole Tranquillo		Eliminated													

== American Idol songwriter contest ==
On the April 3 show, Ryan Seacrest announced the first American Idol songwriting contest. After an open online submission process, where over 25,000 submissions were received, twenty songs were selected for competition by Simon Fuller and A&R representatives of 19 Entertainment. Beginning on May 2, 2007, and ending on May 8, 2007, with "one online vote per fan", the American public were able to listen to snippets from each song and rate them on the American Idol website. On the May 22 show, the two finalists performed the winning song: "This Is My Now". The song was released as a single by Jordin Sparks.

The titles of the twenty songs were:

- "Close to Me" – Michael Doane and AnneMarie Milazzo
- "Forever Starts Today" – Erin Boheme and CJ Vanston
- "If You Ask Me To" – Jennifer Hamady and Shedrick Mitchell
- "I'm Going to Be Me" – Lane Lenhart
- "In Your Eyes" – Colin Armstrong
- "I Saw Stars" – Reed Waddle
- "Lost (Without You)" – Cal Harris Jr.
- "Love Me till the Lonely's Gone" – Michael Patzig and Tracey Naples
- "The Next Big Thing" – Ray Grant and Sam Sims
- "One Night" – Kelley Hill
- "Right Here with Me" – Kelli Trontell and Don Gatlin
- "Secrets and Lies" – Drew Yowell and Byron Zanos
- "Send Me on My Way" – Matthew Rogers and Scott Young
- "Someday" – Nelson Kole
- "This Is My Now" – Jeff Peabody and Scott Krippayne – Contest Winner
- "Tonight" – Kelly Corsino
- "Waking in a Dream" – R. J. Martinez and Stacy Hogan
- "When You Need a Moment" – Christie Leigh
- "With All the Love Your Heart Can Hold" – Robin Randall and Diana De Witt
- "You Never Gave Up on Me" – Billy Aerts and Burton Collins

== Controversies ==
There was controversy surrounding the judges' comments over the audition of a Special Olympics participant named Jonathan Jayne. American Idol producer Ken Warwick responded by saying: "It's not a conscious decision, It's just that the further we go in the series, there are less and less good singers, so the numbers are made up by more bad ones." Warwick said that he thinks everyone has the right to audition, and added that in some instances when there are singers with certain disabilities who just want to meet the judges, the producers will "turn the cameras off and bring them in. We give them a good experience."

A series of provocative photos of Antonella Barba surfaced on the Internet.

On Tuesday, April 17, 2007, the day after the Virginia Tech massacre, while Chris Richardson and Ryan Seacrest were discussing the shooting after Richardson's critique, Simon Cowell apparently appeared to be rolling his eyes at the incident, when he was actually speaking to Paula Abdul and did not hear what Chris had said. On the results show the next day, Cowell said, "I may not be the nicest person in the world, but I would never, ever, ever disrespect those families or those victims, and I felt it was important to set the record straight." To clear Cowell's name, a video was shown on the result show which showed Cowell and Abdul talking with an inset of Chris and Seacrest discussing the shooting. Additionally, Seacrest began the performance show by acknowledging what had happened the day before.

== Reception ==
=== U.S. Nielsen ratings ===
Live + same day ratings

American Idol ended the season as the top show of the 2006–2007 TV season. Its Wednesday episodes ranked first with an average of 30.02 million viewers, followed by the Tuesday episodes which averaged 29.54 million. The premiere episode became the series' highest rated debut episode, viewed by 37.44 million viewers and receiving a 15.8/36 Nielsen rating in the Adult 18-49 demographic.

Episode list

Show	Episode	Air date	Week rank	Rating/Share	18-49 rating/Share	Viewers (in millions)
1	"Minneapolis Auditions"	January 16, 2007	3	20.3 / 29	15.8 / 36	37.44
2	"Seattle Auditions"	January 17, 2007	4	20.1 / 30	15.5 / 36	36.94
3	"Memphis Auditions"	January 23, 2007	2	18.0 / 26	13.3 / 33	32.60
4	"New York Auditions"	January 24, 2007	1	18.9 / 28	14.1 / 35	33.87
5	"Birmingham Auditions"	January 30, 2007	4	18.6 /28	13.5 / 33	33.65
6	"Los Angeles Auditions"	January 31, 2007	5	18.0 / 27	13.7 / 32	31.85
7	"San Antonio Auditions"	February 6, 2007	1	18.4 / 27	13.5 / 33	33.36
8	"Best of the Rest"	February 7, 2007	2	15.9 / 23	12.0 / 27	27.91
9	"Hollywood Round, Part 1"	February 13, 2007	1	17.4 / 25	13.0 / 31	31.20
10	"Hollywood Round, Part 2"	February 14, 2007	2	16.2 / 24	12.2 / 29	28.89
11	"Top 12 Men Perform"	February 20, 2007	3	16.5 / 25	11.8 / 30	29.53
12	"Top 12 Women Perform"	February 21, 2007	2	17.2 / 26	12.3 / 31	30.46
13	"Top 24 Results"	February 22, 2007	6	14.1 / 21	9.1 / 23	24.44
14	"Top 10 Men Perform"	February 27, 2007	1	17.1 / 26	12.2 / 30	30.65
15	"Top 10 Women Perform"	February 28, 2007	2	17.5 / 27	11.9 / 30	29.78
16	"Top 20 Results"	March 1, 2007	3	15.5 / 23	10.5 / 26	27.39
17	"Top 8 Men Perform"	March 6, 2007	2	15.9 / 24	10.9 / 29	27.95
18	"Top 8 Women Perform"	March 7, 2007	1	16.7 / 26	11.2 / 30	28.55
19	"Top 12 Revealed"	March 8, 2007	3	16.0 / 25	10.4 / 28	27.52
20	"Top 12 Perform"	March 13, 2007	1	17.1 / 27	11.7 / 31	29.83
21	"Top 12 Results"	March 14, 2007	2	16.2 / 26	10.1 / 26	26.18
22	"Top 11 Perform"	March 20, 2007	1	17.9 / 27	11.8 / 30	29.96
23	"Top 11 Results"	March 21, 2007	2	18.0 / 27	10.4 / 27	27.08
24	"Top 10 Perform"	March 27, 2007	1	16.2 / 26	11.0 / 30	28.18
25	"Top 10 Results"	March 28, 2007	2	16.2 / 25	10.9 / 28	26.89
26	"Top 9 Perform"	April 3, 2007	1	15.7 / 25	10.4 / 29	26.67
27	"Top 9 Results"	April 4, 2007	2	15.5 / 24	9.9 / 26	26.10
28	"Top 8 Perform"	April 10, 2007	2	15.6 / 24	10.3 / 29	26.78
29	"Top 8 Results"	April 11, 2007	1	16.5 / 25	11.1 / 27	28.56
30	"Top 7 Perform"	April 17, 2007	2	15.4 / 24	10.2 / 28	26.55
31	Top 7 Results"	April 18, 2007	1	17.2 / 26	11.2 / 28	28.93
32	"Top 6 Perform"	April 24, 2007	2	15.7 / 25	10.0 / 28	26.55
33	""Idol Gives Back"	April 25, 2007	1	15.6 / 25	10.2 / 27	26.93
34	"Top 6 Performs again"	May 1, 2007	2	15.7 / 25	10.2 / 29	26.73
35	"Top 6 Results"	May 2, 2007	1	17.0 / 26	11.0 / 28	28.75
36	"Top 4 Perform"	May 8, 2007	2	15.1 / 25	9.3 / 28	25.47
37	"Top 4 Results"	May 9, 2007	1	16.9 / 26	10.8 / 28	28.20
38	"Top 3 Perform"	May 15, 2007	2	14.1 / 23	9.4 / 26	24.23
39	"Top 3 Results"	May 16, 2007	1	16.5 / 25	10.8 / 28	28.05
40	"Top 2 Perform"	May 22, 2007	2	14.9 / 24	9.7 / 27	25.33
41	Season 6 Finale"	May 23, 2007	1	17.8 / 29	11.5 / 29	30.74

Live + 7 day (DVR) ratings

== Related programming ==
=== American Idol Extra (season 2) ===
American Idol Extra, a behind-the-scenes show, also returned for a second season, corresponding with the start of the finals in March. It aired on Thursdays on Fox Reality.

=== Idol Gives Back 2007 ===
On the March 8 results show, Ryan Seacrest announced an initiative to give back to people in poverty in both Africa and the United States, including those affected by Hurricane Katrina. The event took place over two episodes of the series. For every vote cast immediately following the April 24 broadcast, sponsors donated funds to the Charity Projects Entertainment Fund. The fund would distribute the money raised to many charities in the United States as well as in Africa. News Corporation pledged to donate 10 cents for every vote made to the show for the first 50 million calls, that is, up to $5 million. MySpace created a special profile page for the event in order to spread the word. Donations from viewers were accepted by phone and through the website during the April 25 results show, in a manner similar to a telethon. Near the end of the broadcast, Seacrest announced the show had raised $30 million. As of May 1, 2007, over $70 million has been raised as a result of Idol Gives Back.

Between contestant performances, video vignettes showing Seacrest and the judges and visiting and observing squalid conditions in Africa and the United States were aired. Similar vignettes were aired during the results show. For this special, the voting period was doubled to four hours following the show, rather than the usual two. In response to the anticipated call volume, each contestant was assigned two toll free numbers. Over 70 million votes were cast.

The results show was broadcast from two locations—the regular American Idol stage and Walt Disney Concert Hall in downtown Los Angeles. It included appearances by celebrity actors and personalities. Ellen DeGeneres co-hosted the event from the Disney Hall stage.

Due to the charity theme of the show, no contestant was eliminated on the April 25 results show. That was a surprise both to viewers, to whom Seacrest promised the "most shocking elimination ever", and to the contestants. When Seacrest seemed about to eliminate Jordin Sparks, he announced that since it was a charity night, none of the contestants would be voted off, and the votes from that week would be added to the votes from the following week, and that two contestants would be eliminated. Both weeks' shows had a two-hour extension of the regular two-hour voting window, and in the end, the two-week combined voting totaled 135 million votes.

=== Idol Chat (season 3) ===
TV Guide Channel aired its third season of Idol Chat.

=== Idol Tonight (season 2) ===
TV Guide Channel brought back a second season of Idol Tonight, the live pre-show to American Idol, which aired on Wednesdays starting in March. The show featured Justin Guarini as a correspondent along with Kimberly Caldwell and Rosanna Tavarez.

== International broadcasts ==
=== U.K. edition ===
For back-to-back repeat of the performance and results shows in the U.K. on ITV2, Cat Deeley presented additional sections preceding and following each commercial break, and followed the end of the show with a short interview with that week's eliminated contestant.

== Music releases ==
Unlike previous seasons, the top 12 compilation album did not come out while the show was airing. The top 12 recorded studio versions of each of the songs they sang on the show. The songs were available for purchase on AmericanIdol.com as digital downloads through the night of the finale.

Originally, a collage of the finalists' head shots from the top 24 photo shoot was used as album art on AmericanIdol.com, with the title American Idol 6: Greatest Moments; at present, the covers of Sparks' and Lewis' EPs are used instead. The American Idol: Season 6 – "Greatest Hits" & "The Collector's Edition" were eventually released on June 12, 2007. This was the only season where the season's collection was not distributed by Sony BMG/RCA Records.

Sparks' first non-American Idol single was the top hit "Tattoo", which received platinum certification. Her second single was the Billboard Hot 100 number three hit "No Air" with Chris Brown. The song went to number one in several countries, and also topped Billboard's Pop Airplay chart. "No Air" had been certified platinum in April. It stands as the bestselling single by any American Idol contestant. Sparks released a third single off her album, "One Step at a Time", which peaked at number 17. "One Step at a Time" so far sold over a million copies and is certified platinum. Sparks released her second album Battlefield in July 2009. The album's title track became her fifth top 20 hit on the Billboard Hot 100, peaking at number 10. That made Jordin Sparks the only American Idol contestant to have their first five singles become Top 20 Hits. Blake Lewis' first single was "Break Anotha!", which failed to chart on the Billboard Hot 100. His second single, "How Many Words", also failed to chart on the Billboard Hot 100. Shortly afterward, Lewis confirmed that he had been dropped by Arista records. His album sales were just over 300,000. The drop also canceled his apparent plans for a third single release.

"This Is My Now," as performed by Jordin Sparks, was released as a radio single. It debuted on the Billboard Hot 100 chart at number 15.

== Concert tour ==
- American Idols LIVE! Tour 2007
