= Chris Richardson =

American singer-songwriter (born 1984)

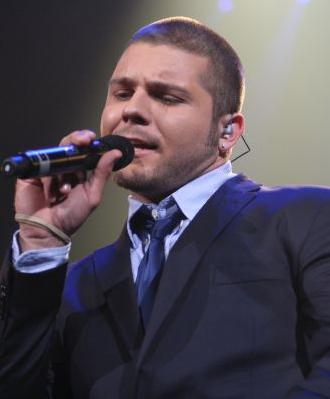
- Richardson performing as part of the American Idols LIVE! Tour 2007

Background information
- Born: Christopher Michael Richardson; February 19, 1984 (age 42); Soignies, Belgium
- Origin: Chesapeake, Virginia, U.S.
- Genres: Pop; rock; R&B
- Occupation: Singer-songwriter
- Instruments: Vocals; guitar; keyboard; drums
- Years active: 2007–present
- Labels: Cash Money Records; Republic
- Spouse: Maryfrances Jerez-Richardson

Christopher Michael Richardson (born February 19, 1984) is an American singer-songwriter who was the fifth-place finalist on the sixth season of American Idol.

== Personal life ==
Richardson was born in Supreme Headquarters Allied Powers Europe Hospital in Belgium to Phyllis and Danny Richardson. His father spent 20 years in the United States Air Force. Richardson moved to Chesapeake, Virginia, in 1999. He admitted during the March 6, 2007 edition of American Idol that he used to be overweight as a child and teenager. He graduated from Great Bridge High School in 2002 and studied music composition at Christopher Newport University in Newport News, Virginia, for a year, playing football there as well. He continued his musical studies at Tidewater Community College. Before Idol, Richardson was a kitchen supervisor for a Hooters restaurant.

Chris plays guitar, drums and piano.

His favorite male singers included Jason Mraz, Justin Timberlake, James Brown, and Michael Jackson. His favorite female artists are early 1990s Mariah Carey, and Christina Aguilera. He has a Bulldog named Tommy.

On April 11, 2016, he and girlfriend, Maryfrances Jerez, welcomed a baby girl.

== American Idol ==
Richardson had auditioned for American Idol in two previous seasons before being cast on season 6 in 2007. Richardson auditioned in New York City, holding number 8963. The judges warmed to him, and he got through the audition process. Richardson was grouped with Paul Kim and AJ Tabaldo in the Hollywood group round.

During American Idol, Chris received many comparisons to Justin Timberlake, including from judge Randy Jackson. "To be even mentioned in the same sentence as someone so successful, it's great," Richardson told the Associated Press on Thursday the day after his elimination in a phone interview. "They might be surprised whenever I come out with my album, that it's completely different than his. So that's when other people might one day be, like 'Hey, you sort of sound like Chris Richardson.'"

Chris and fellow idol Blake Lewis had said on Chris' elimination night that they are best friends.

=== American Idol Performances ===
- Audition: A Song for You (originally sung by Leon Russell, covered by Donny Hathaway)
- Hollywood Week: I Love You More Than You'll Ever Know (originally sung by Donny Hathaway)

Week #	Theme	Song Choice	Original Artist	Order #	Result
Top 24 (12 Men)	N/A	I Don't Want to Be	Gavin DeGraw	5	Safe
Top 20 (10 Men)	N/A	Geek in the Pink	Jason Mraz	9	Safe
Top 16 (8 Men)	N/A	Tonight I Wanna Cry	Keith Urban	4	Safe
Top 12	Diana Ross	The Boss	Diana Ross	11	Safe
Top 11	British Invasion	Don't Let the Sun Catch You Crying	Gerry & The Pacemakers	2	Bottom 2^{1}
Top 10	No Doubt/Artists who inspire Gwen Stefani	Don't Speak	No Doubt	10	Safe
Top 9	American Classics	Don't Get Around Much Anymore	Duke Ellington	4	Safe
Top 8	Latin	Smooth	Santana feat. Rob Thomas	3	Bottom 3^{2}
Top 7	Country	Mayberry	Rascal Flatts	5	Safe
Top 6	Inspirational	Change the World	Eric Clapton	1	Safe
Top 6^{3}	Bon Jovi	Wanted Dead or Alive	Bon Jovi	5	Eliminated

- ^Note 1 When Ryan Seacrest announced the results in the particular night, Richardson was in the bottom two but declared safe when Stephanie Edwards was eliminated.
- ^Note 2 Richardson was saved first from elimination.
- ^Note 3 Due to the Idol Gives Back performance, the Top 6 remained intact for another week.

== Post Idol ==
Richardson participated in the Season 6 tour along with the rest of the Top 10 after Season six ended.

He started working on his debut album after the tour, then tentatively titled Come Right Back to You, which he said will be a mix of both rock, soul/R&B. "It'll be a mixture of a Maroon 5 sound with a little bit of Jason Mraz," said Richardson. "I love rock and roll but I have this soulful type voice and I just like to infuse both of them."

On February 22, 2008, a new song leaked onto the internet from Richardson, entitled "All Alone." The song was then released commercially, being available on iTunes among other places. Richardson performs the song on over 30 radio/TV stations as part of his 10 city tour, sponsored by Breyers. On May 20, 2008, the album was put on the fast track and was recorded in Los Angeles, Miami and Virginia. Producers include Ill Factor, Brent Paschke and Troy "Radio" Johnson.

Richardson co-wrote the track "What'cha Got 2 Lose?" on Blake Lewis' debut album A.D.D. (Audio Day Dream), as well as the bonus track "Human" released exclusively via iTunes. He has also said in an interview that he has written songs for winner Jordin Sparks and Phil Stacey and plans on writing with Gina Glocksen.

On April 19, 2008, Richardson appeared as a surprise guest at Jason Mraz's "Music, Magic and Makepeace Tour." He sang a duet with Mraz called "Geek in the Pink". On March 20, 2009, Richardson was the opening act for Josh Hodge in New York City at the Canal Room, performing a couple of songs, including "All Alone."

In May 2009, he appeared on the red carpet for the American Idol finale, as well as a "Relay for Life" charity event at Currituck County High School. He also sang in the ninth season finale of American Idol in 2010 with other seasons' finalists in a tribute to Simon Cowell's last show.

In 2011, Richardson collaborated with Tyga on the single "Far Away". The single was released on May 17, 2011 and reached number 86 in Billboard Hot 100.

In 2012, Richardson signed a record deal with Cash Money Records and Republic Records.

In January 2012, he released the single "In the Name of Love" which was followed by a music video.

Later that year, he released his official debut single "Joy & Pain" featuring Tyga on August 28, 2012.

In mid-2012 it was announced that Universal Republic Records was going defunct, making Richardson and other artists move to Republic Records making the label itself revived.

In 2013, he released two new songs "Collecting" and "Why You Mad" which were followed by a Kickstarter campaign in 2014 to help fund a mixtape and tour which did not make its goal.

In 2015, he announced that he and YMCMB had parted ways and that he'd be releasing his music independently. Additionally, he announced work on two EPs: Press Play and Murder She Wrote. Later that year, he was featured on the international single "Bigger Better Faster" with Follow Your Instinct and Busta Rhymes which hit the Top 3 in Japan. On December 7, 2015, he premiered a cover of Bryson Tiller's hit "Don't" on his official media handles which garnered positive reviews. His new single "Rear View" will be released on February 19, 2016.

== Discography ==
=== Albums ===
- Chris Richardson - EP (June 12, 2007)
- Press Play - EP (TBA 2016)
- Murder She Wrote - EP (TBA 2016)

=== Singles ===
- "All Alone" (March 12, 2008)
- "Floating off the Ground" (November 1, 2009)
- "In the Name of Love" (January 12, 2012)
- "Joy and Pain" (featuring Tyga) (August 28, 2012)
- "Collecting"
- "Why You Mad" (featuring Caskey) (August 7, 2013)
- "Bigger Better Faster" (with Follow Your Instinct & Busta Rhymes) (2015)
- "Rear View" (February 19, 2016)

=== As featured artist ===
List of singles, with selected chart positions and certifications, showing year released and album name
Title	Year	Peak chart positions							Certifications	Album/Mixtape
Title	Year	US	US R&B	US Rap	AUS	CAN	FRA	UK	Certifications	Album/Mixtape
"Far Away" (Tyga featuring Chris Richardson)	2011	86	93	16	—	—	—	—	RIAA: Gold	Careless World: Rise of the Last King
"—" denotes a recording that did not chart or was not released in that territory.
