= Paul Kim (musician, born 1981) =

American singer (born 1981)

Paul Kim (born March, 1981) is a Korean American musician, singer and rapper.

== Background ==
Kim grew up in Saratoga, California, and attended Monta Vista High School in Cupertino, California. As can be seen in his Season 6 American Idol segment, Kim's motivation for auditioning for the show was to dispel and shatter the stereotypical Asian images that William Hung perpetuated during prior seasons.

== On American Idol ==
Kim's initial performance on Season 6 of American Idol garnered all "yes" votes from the judges, and Randy Jackson declared that Kim had one of the best male vocals he heard that season, in Season 6. When Kim made it as one of the top 24 semi-finalists, it was mentioned that the judges were divided by "a split decision". It is notable that he sang barefoot during all of his performances.

== Work, YouTube channel, and career ==
Kim currently has a YouTube channel that has over 337,000 subscribers and over 189,830,000 total views as of 2020. Some of his most popular videos are: his cover of an English version of Big Bang's "Bad Girl" (the music video also starring Eunice Kiss), his cover of Taeyang's "I Need A Girl" (with David So), his cover of G-Dragon's "That XX" (with David So), and his cover of Bruno Mars' "Locked Out of Heaven" (Paul Kim x John Ho remix). Kim has also done covers of songs by Drake, Robin Thicke, Justin Timberlake, Miguel, Omarion, Usher, Boyz II Men, Frank Ocean, Coldplay, Beyoncé, Adele and others. Kim has also worked with other YouTube artists such as Dumbfoundead/Parker, David So, Joseph Vincent, Z. Woods, Baiyu, Eunice Kiss, Jennifer Chung, Megan Lee, Danakadan (afterschoolspecial) and other artists.

Among his original songs include "No Turning Back" with Dumbfoundead/Parker and CHOPS (the music video directed by Timothy Tau and JL Jupiter), "You Left Me for That" (the music video directed by Anthony Bui and starring Grace Su and Timothy DeLaGhetto), "Outta My Head" (music video directed by Alexandher), "Today" (music video directed by Daniel Kwan), "Getaway" (music video directed by Evan Asato), "She Is The Reason" (music video directed by Edward Park), "Make Believe" (feat. Baiyu (singer)) (music video directed by Anthony Bui), "Still Not Over You" (feat. Eunice Kiss) (music video directed by Ebling Howard), "You Had Your Chance" (music video directed by Dan Fisher), "Give Into Me" (music video directed by Evan Asato) and more. Most of his original songs and remixes are available for purchase over iTunes.

Kim also has started his own apparel line along with David So, entitled "Go For Broke Apparel".

Kim has released an album titled My Word which includes fifteen tracks on January 21, 2015.
