= Gina Glocksen =

American singer

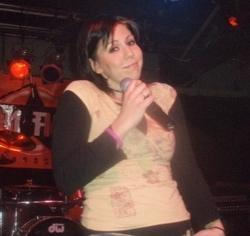

Background information
- Born: Gina Glocksen; July 4, 1984 (age 42)
- Origin: Tinley Park, Illinois, United States
- Genre: Rock
- Occupations: Singer, dental assistant
- Website: https://www.ginaglocksenband.com/

Gina Glocksen-Ruzicka (née Glocksen; born July 4, 1984) is an American singer who was the ninth-place finisher on the sixth season of American Idol. She previously appeared in season 5. Glocksen is the first among the few contestants to have been eliminated in the Hollywood round in an earlier season and then place in a later one.

== Biography ==
Glocksen grew up in Tinley Park, Illinois, a suburb to Chicago's southwest, and attended Virgil I. Grissom Jr. High School and Victor J. Andrew High School. She has been singing since age seven. She had classical music training in high school, where she learned to play the piano and flute.

Prior to her second audition for the sixth season of American Idol, Glocksen worked as a dental assistant in Worth, Illinois and also performed in the cover band Catfight.

== American Idol ==
In Season 5 of American Idol, Glocksen auditioned in Chicago and sang Jennifer Rush's "The Power of Love," which advanced her to Hollywood. In the first round of Hollywood auditions, Glocksen performed "If I Ever Fall In Love Again." She was eliminated on the final day.

In Season 6, Glocksen had a second chance to audition. Her audition song, in Memphis, Tennessee, was "Black Velvet", and she made it again to Hollywood. During Hollywood week, she sang "Be My Baby" by The Ronettes, together with Perla Meneses, Jessica Gordon and Marisa Rhodes in the group round. On the final day, she performed Bryan Adams's "Have You Ever Really Loved A Woman." Glocksen finally made into the Top 24, and then into the finals. She was voted off on April 4, 2007, making her the ninth-placed finalist. Like Chris Sligh and Stephanie Edwards before her, she was never in the bottom three or two until she was eliminated.

=== Performances during voting weeks ===
Week #	Theme	Song Choice	Original Artist	Order #	Result
Top 24 (12 Women)	N/A	"All By Myself"	Eric Carmen	11	Safe
Top 20 (10 Women)	N/A	"Alone"	i-TEN	1	Safe
Top 16 (8 Women)	N/A	"Call Me When You're Sober"	Evanescence	7	Safe
Top 12	Diana Ross	"Love Child"	The Supremes	4	Safe
Top 11	British Invasion	"Paint It Black"	The Rolling Stones	9	Safe
Top 10	No Doubt/Artists who inspire Gwen Stefani	"I'll Stand By You"	The Pretenders	3	Safe
Top 9	American Classics	"Smile"	Charlie Chaplin	6	Eliminated

== After American Idol ==
Following her elimination, Glocksen appeared on Live with Regis and Kelly and The Ellen DeGeneres Show, performing "Alone" on the latter. She also appeared on ME TV on Nickelodeon, although she did not sing.

After her duet with Phil Stacey during an Illinois show of the American Idols LIVE! Tour 2007, Glocksen's boyfriend of three years, Joe Ruzicka, appeared on stage and surprised her with a marriage proposal.

In season 7 of American Idol, Glocksen worked as co-host on American Idol Extra with Constantine Maroulis.

She later worked on original material. She performed one song, 'When It Rains", on American Idol Extra.

Glocksen fronts a cover band, the Gina Glocksen Band. In 2020, she was a member of Ballroom with a Twist, a national touring stage show. She released a single, "Superhero", on iTunes in March 2011, under a record label called "Wicked Lip Records."

== EP ==
Glocksen has released an EP containing the four songs she sang while in the final 12 of American Idol.

1. "Love Child" (3:05)
2. "Paint It Black" (3:28)
3. "I'll Stand By You" (4:03)
4. "Smile" (2:46)

== Personal life ==
On New Year's Eve 2008, Glocksen married science teacher Joe Ruzicka, who is the bass player in Glocken's band. Jordin Sparks and Haley Scarnato served as two of her bridesmaids. The couple live in Naperville, Illinois, with their daughter.
