= Sanjaya Malakar =

American singer (born 1989)

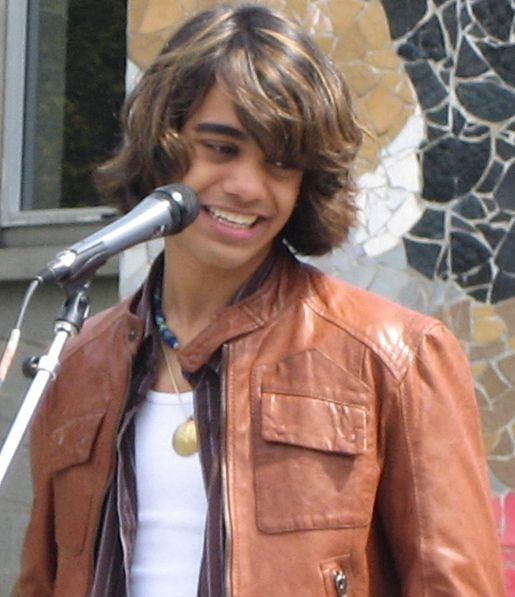
- Sanjaya Malakar at the Mural Amphitheater, Seattle Center, Seattle, WA on May 12, 2007.

Background information
- Born: Sanjaya Joseph Malakar; September 10, 1989 (age 37); Seattle, Washington, U.S.
- Origin: Federal Way, Washington, U.S.
- Genre: Pop
- Occupations: Singer, reality television personality, writer, pastry chef
- Instruments: Vocals, guitar, keyboard
- Years active: 2006–present

Sanjaya Joseph Malakar (born September 10, 1989) is an American singer who was a finalist on the sixth season of American Idol. He gained national attention on the series, controversially advancing to 7th place with public votes despite being poorly received by the show's judges, particularly Simon Cowell.

After Idol, Malakar made many television guest appearances and has been commonly parodied in popular culture. He placed fifth in the second season of the reality television show I'm a Celebrity...Get Me Out of Here!.

== Early life ==
Malakar was born in Seattle, Washington, the son of Vasudeva Malakar, a Bengali-Indian immigrant born in Vrindavan, India, and Jillian (née Recchi) Blyth, an American of Italian descent on one side and Dutch, English, and Irish ancestry on the other. He later lived in the nearby suburb of Federal Way. His parents filed for divorce when he was three years old, and they had already been separated for a year. He, his mother, and his siblings then lived on welfare in a Seattle apartment His mother remarried, but his stepfather died soon afterwards. Although Malakar spent the majority of his formative years in the Seattle area, he has also lived in both California and Kauaʻi, Hawaii, where he performed with the Hawaii Children's Theater group. While in Seattle, he spent three years with the Total Experience Gospel Choir.

Malakar attended Martha Lake Elementary School in Lynnwood, Washington, for elementary school and the Seattle Waldorf School and Northshore Junior High School for middle school in Bothell, Washington. He attended Shorecrest High School in Shoreline, Washington, during freshman year, and Todd Beamer High School in Federal Way, Washington, during sophomore year. After his sophomore year, Malakar passed the General Educational Development test in order to leave high school early and focus on a music career and his participation in American Idol.

== American Idol ==
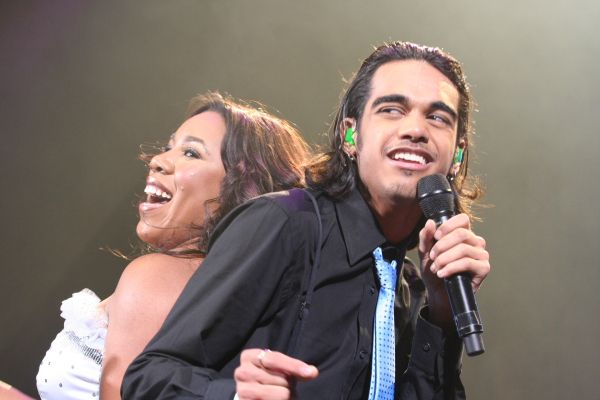
After making the top 10, Malakar performed on the American Idol Tour with fellow Idol alums, including Melinda Doolittle.

On September 19, 2006, Malakar, a shy teen, entered the open audition for American Idol at Seattle Center in Seattle with his sister Shyamali. Judge Simon Cowell commented that Sanjaya had a better voice than his sister. The judges advanced both to the Hollywood round. Malakar cited Stevie Wonder as his idol and sang one of Wonder's signature songs, "Signed, Sealed, Delivered I'm Yours", at his Seattle audition.

For his next performance, in Hollywood, Malakar sang "Some Kind of Wonderful". He was shown tearfully embracing his sister when she was cut, though he progressed to the Top 40. Next, Malakar sang "Ain't No Mountain High Enough". The judges were largely critical of his performance, but Simon Cowell admitted that Malakar was popular with the voters, while Randy Jackson and Paula Abdul gave a more positive appraisal of his "You Really Got Me" performance in the Top 11. A 13-year-old girl named Ashley Ferl was highlighted repeatedly during Malakar's performance in the Top-11 episode, crying tears of joy; Ferl also cried for Melinda Doolittle, Jordin Sparks, and many other contestants.

On March 27, 2007, Malakar sang No Doubt's "Bathwater" wearing a fauxhawk made from multiple ponytails. The style was called the "ponyhawk" by host Ryan Seacrest. While singing, Malakar hesitated with some of the words in the song. Simon Cowell remarked, "Sanjaya, I don't think it matters anymore what we say ... I think you are in your own universe and if people like you, good luck." The following night, host Seacrest walked out on stage wearing a wig with the same hairstyle, parodying Malakar.

On April 3, Malakar sang "Cheek to Cheek" wearing a white suit, donning a slick hairstyle (with a recent haircut), and dancing with judge Paula Abdul. Abdul commented, "I get it. I get why people love you. You are charming." On the April 4 results show, it was revealed that Malakar had finished in the "middle three," among nine contestants.

Malakar's performance of "Bésame Mucho" in the Top 8 on April 10 was his first unanimously well-received performance by the judges in the finals of the competition. During rehearsals, Jennifer Lopez remarked, "I like this kid. I love Sanjaya!" after hearing him sing in Spanish, the only one of the remaining eight contestants to do so on the Latin-themed night. Randy Jackson commented, "You're one of the smartest contestants I've ever met. That was actually really good. It was," while Simon Cowell offered the halting, "I'm going to hate myself for this. It wasn't horrible." Malakar continued on, entering the Top 7, following that performance on the April 11 results show.

After performing "Something to Talk About" the previous night, Malakar was placed in the bottom three and was subsequently eliminated in 7th place on April 18, 2007. Singing his farewell performance, after the line "let's give them something to talk about", he ad libbed "other than hair" in place of "how about love".

American Idol's ratings dropped 9% in the episode following Malakar's elimination: Idol Gives Back, a charity episode featuring many celebrity guests. The music news website Moldolva.org claimed that this was due to Malakar's departure.

On the May 23 American Idol finale, he performed with the top six males, introducing Smokey Robinson in the medley. Malakar performed "You Really Got Me" with Aerosmith guitarist Joe Perry on guitar.

=== Performances ===
Week	Theme	Song Choice	Original Artist	Order	Result
Top 24 (12 Men)	N/A	"Knocks Me Off My Feet"	Stevie Wonder	8	Safe
Top 20 (10 Men)	N/A	"Steppin' Out with My Baby"	Irving Berlin	4	Safe
Top 16 (8 Men)	N/A	"Waiting on the World to Change"	John Mayer	2	Safe
Top 12	Diana Ross	"Ain't No Mountain High Enough"	Marvin Gaye & Tammi Terrell	5	Bottom 2^{1}
Top 11	British Invasion	"You Really Got Me"	The Kinks	8	Safe
Top 10	No Doubt/Artists who inspire Gwen Stefani	"Bathwater"	No Doubt	4	Safe
Top 9	American Classics	"Cheek to Cheek"	Irving Berlin	7	Safe
Top 8	Latin	"Bésame Mucho"	Consuelo Velázquez	8	Safe
Top 7	Country	"Something to Talk About"	Bonnie Raitt	3	Eliminated

- ^Note 1 When Ryan Seacrest announced the results that night, Malakar was among the bottom three, but declared safe second when Brandon Rogers was eliminated.

=== Public reaction ===
Based on articles and internet searches, Malakar was the season's most talked-about American Idol contestant. One American Idol fan on the since-defunct social media platform Myspace claimed to be on a hunger strike until Malakar was voted off; she later admitted that she was canceling her strike after his stay was longer than expected. In her YouTube video, a dating-site advertisement was prominently displayed, prompting speculation that her hunger strike was for profit. Other members of the Myspace online community created a page entitled "Team Sanjaya" in support for him. However, members of the online community contributed semi-fictional websites that appeared to portray Malakar in a more satirical, yet supportive, way. Websites parodying Malakar's success had also appeared.

An official fansite for Malakar was created with approval of and contributions by the entertainer and his mother, Jillian Blyth, and archives include in-person reports for each American Idols LIVE! Tour 2007 event.

Simon Cowell told Extra that had Malakar won, he would not have returned as a judge on the show, even though he was contractually obligated to return. The show's executive producer predicted that Malakar would not win. Some commentators have remarked that the judges seemed to have stopped giving thoughtful critiques of Malakar's performances. The judges seemed stunned by his large following of voters. Randy Jackson went as far to remark "I cannot even say anything on the vocals anymore" in his critique of Malakar after his performance during the top nine. Chris Ayres of The Times speculated that it would have been a turning point leading toward decline and eventual cancellation for American Idol if Malakar had won. Others, however, believe that the franchise benefited from the publicity, which was more popular than previous seasons of Idol. On the April 17 broadcast of American Idol, Cowell further said of the controversy, "I know this has been funny for a while, but based on the fact that we are supposed to be finding the next American Idol [Malakar's performance] was hideous."

The weblog Vote for the Worst had Malakar as its current "pick" for the sixth season top 12 until he was eliminated. On March 19, 2007, Howard Stern campaigned for his radio show listeners to join the weblog in voting for Malakar "to corrupt the No.1 show on television". Some Stern regulars claimed to have voted for Malakar over 300 times—largely in hopes of tormenting American Idol traditionalists on the show. Later, when asked for a reaction, Malakar told Jimmy Kimmel that his aunt had voted 1,100 times.

The fan reaction of Ashley Ferl was satirized on the March 24, 2007, broadcast of Saturday Night Live during its Weekend Update segment. Andy Samberg portrayed Malakar, and Kristen Wiig portrayed the crying girl. Also feigning tears in the audience were Fred Armisen and Dan Aykroyd. Samberg portrayed Malakar again during the monologue of the April 21, 2007, episode, singing the song "Something To Talk About" as a duet with host Scarlett Johansson. The controversy spawned colloquialisms associated with Malakar's name, such as "Sanjayamania" and "Fanjaya", to denote a Sanjaya fan.

=== Homecoming ===
After receiving over 200 emails from around the country asking the city to honor Malakar, especially in light of the city of Bothell, Washington, declaring a Blake Lewis day for his fellow Idol contestant, the Federal Way City Council claimed it was unable to find any information about him or any ties to the city. City Manager Neal Beets dismissed the calls, saying the city "had more important things to deal with" and derided Malakar as an "'Idol' wannabe." In response to the city's dismissiveness, the local mall, the Commons at Federal Way, independently tracked down Malakar and arranged an appearance. Malakar was greeted by screaming fans at the event, and he was praised by the city's then-mayor, Michael Park, and King County Council member Pete von Reichbauer for serving as a great role model, with Park stating, "Sanjaya's charismatic personality, contagious smile, positive attitude and enthusiastic pursuit of his dreams are qualities to be admired." Malakar was presented a Certificate of Appreciation from Park, and von Reichbauer declared the creation of "South King County Sanjaya Malakar Day". In May 2007, he was also honored at Seattle Center in Seattle, where he was greeted by fans, signed autographs, and answered questions.

=== Tour ===
Since Malakar placed in the top 10, he qualified to perform as part of the American Idols LIVE! Tour 2007, which, over three months, visited over 50 cities in Canada and the U.S. He performed Michael Jackson's "The Way You Make Me Feel" during the tour.

== Career ==
=== After Idol ===
Shortly after his run on American Idol ended, Malakar attended the White House Correspondents' Association Dinner as a People magazine guest, where he saw then-President George W. Bush. Malakar was popular among the press and fans at the dinner, and was even prompted for an autograph by then-New York Governor Eliot Spitzer.

Several magazines honored the singer, including Us Weekly, People, TIME, and Teen. He was featured in Us Magazine's April 20, 2007, issue in an article entitled "Sanjaya Speaks", where he was asked about his reactions to the parodies, Simon Cowell, Howard Stern and to his new celebrity status. He was featured in the May 7, 2007, issue of People, where he talked about his American Idol run, his younger years, and future aspirations. The article mentions that he was raised vegetarian, a diet he no longer follows. In TIME's 2007 "TIME 100 POLL for The Most Influential People of the Year", based on online public votes, he ranked third. He was nominated for Teen's 2007 "Top Ten Most Cutest".

Award shows acknowledged Malakar, as well. He won two of TV.com's Fashion Awards, in the categories of "ON AIR: Best Hair – Male", and "OFF AIR: Best Trendsetter – Male", by public votes. He was nominated for "Best Reality Show Star" in AZN Television's annual Asian Excellence Awards and was a presenter at the awards ceremony aired May 24, 2007 on E! and May 28, 2007 on AZN-TV. At the 2007 Teen Choice Awards on August 26, he was named "Best TV Reality Star". He grabbed a nomination and a win for Fox's 2007 Golden Realitini Awards. At the October 13, 2007 show, he was nominated for "Most Memorable Reality Personality of the Year", and he won the "Favorite Reality Game Loser" award at the awards ceremony, where he was a presenter. Malakar won Fox's 2007 Golden Realitini Award for Favorite Reality Game Loser aired. "Sanjaya's Ponyhawk" was ranked as No. 3 in the 2007 "Top TV Moment" video searches by AOL.

=== TV appearances ===
In the months following Idol, Malakar appeared as a guest on multiple television shows, including The Tonight Show with Jay Leno, Access Hollywood, The Today Show, Good Morning America, Are You Smarter than a 5th Grader?, Live with Regis and Kelly, The Ellen DeGeneres Show, the Late Show with David Letterman, The Morning Show, Extra, The Early Show, Jimmy Kimmel Live! and The Rachel Ray Show. Additionally, he got "slimed" on Nickelodeon. He also appeared with the rest of the top 10 on Larry King Live, Access Hollywood, and Good Day L.A.

Upon meeting Billy Ray Cyrus, Malakar reported discussing a guest spot on Disney Channel's Hannah Montana in an April 20, 2007 interview with Access Hollywood. His name was mentioned in a 2007 episode, but no physical appearance was made.

=== Projects ===
On May 22, 2007, a one-minute short I Am Art, co-produced with Will Ferrell, was released online with Malakar playing Bill Vendall, a 25-year-old graduate student of the arts, who created the character "Sanjaya Malakar" to appear on American Idol, as an installment of his thesis. Malakar released a follow-up video explaining it was a joke, since some believed Bill Vendall was real.

Malakar also hosted an American Idol show on the TV Guide channel called Idol Stars: Where Are They Now?, talking about what past Idol stars are currently doing. Malakar also mentioned that he was continuing music and he helped write the book, Chicken Soup for the American Idol Soul. Malakar also wrote an autobiography entitled Dancing to the Music in My Head: Memoirs of the People's Idol in 2009. He reported that he received a $100,000 advance for the book. In India, Malakar received his first acting role, where he starred in a Nationwide Mutual Insurance Company commercial, where he seeks help from a guru.

In May–June 2009, he starred in the reality show second season of the reality television show I'm a Celebrity...Get Me Out of Here! along with Torrie Wilson, Holly Montag, Heidi Montag, Spencer Pratt, Stephen Baldwin, Daniel Baldwin, Janice Dickinson, Lou Diamond Phillips, John Salley, Frangela, and Patti Blagojevich. On the show he earned the nickname "Jungle Boy" in recognition of how comfortable he appeared in the jungle. He developed a close friendship with the older Holly Montag, as such, her sister Heidi had dubbed them "SanJolly". They have stated that they are not in a relationship, but do spend considerable time together.

In May 2010, Seattle Weekly reported that Malakar was working as a singer for Pagliacci Pizza, a Seattle-based pizzeria chain.

On February 23, 2011, Malakar joined the off-Broadway musical Freckleface Strawberry at New World Stages.

On February 26, 2011, Malakar was a guest judge for the finals of local Seattle talent competition, "Seattle Superstar Search."

In July 2011 Malakar toured the United States with the band, The Brave Chandeliers.

As of May 2012, Malakar was a bartender living in Queens, New York. Of the money he made, Malakar admitted most has been lost: "I was young. I didn't know anything. Some people took advantage. Some skimmed a little off the top, financially."

As of April 2014, Malakar quit working at an East Village bar to have more time and energy to focus on his music, including his work-in-progress, Life ~ Love ~ Music, and his focus on studio covers.

On July 14, 2016 he performed at the Suquamish Clearwater Casino Resort in Suquamish, Washington as part of their Free Summer Lawn Concert series.

Malakar sings seven jazz standards on the album Good Merlin by The Chaz Lipp Groove Tripp. The album was released on June 23, 2017 and Malakar has received positive reviews for his performance. Writing for The Morton Report, Bill Bentley (record producer) says Malakar's voice "goes directly for the core of these American songbook standards." Bill Buckley of the U.K.-based SoulandFunkandJazz describes Malakar's "remarkable voice" as "different, unusual, unexpected." Blogcritics writer Rhetta Akamatsu rated the album 96/100 largely due to Malakar's "incredible, flexible voice." Ronald Jackson of The Smooth Jazz Ride website says "Sanjaya Malakar is truly a singer with brilliant pipes... His passion is clear and bold on each track he engages. Great range and control."

== Discography ==
Malakar's American Idol CD album Sanjaya Malakar, and some singles were offered on iTunes starting June 10, 2007. The Sanjaya Malakar album has reached Top 100 Pop Albums in sales. Malakar's EP Dancing to the Music in my Head was released on January 20, 2009. Songs from the EP include the singles "A Guy Like Me" and "A Quintessential Lullaby". The EP was released the same day as Malakar's book, titled the same as the EP. In 2011, he is also releasing his album Life ~ Love ~ Music with the pre-release debut single from the album being a cover of "Tempted", a 1981 hit from Squeeze.

=== Albums ===
Year	Title	Type
2007	Sanjaya Malakar	EP
2007	American Idol Season 6: The Collector's Edition	EP
2007	American Idol Season 6: Greatest Hits	EP
2009	Dancing to the Music in my Head	EP
2011	Life ~ Love ~ Music	EP

=== Singles ===
Year	Title	Type
2007	"Ain't No Mountain High Enough"	EP
2007	"You Really Got Me"	EP
2007	"Bathwater"	EP
2007	"Cheek to Cheek"	EP
2007	"Bésame Mucho"	EP
2007	"Something to Talk About"	EP
2011	"Tempted"	Life ~ Love ~ Music

== Personal life ==
In a 2022 interview, Malakar revealed that he was working as a pastry chef in Montana after walking away from the entertainment industry. He also mentioned that he identified as bisexual.
