= Charity Projects Entertainment Fund =

North American charity

Charity Projects Entertainment Fund (CPEF) is a North American charity committed to fighting extreme poverty in the United States and Africa. It was founded in 2007 by Richard Curtis, Kevin Cahill and Simon Fuller.

In April 2007 the fund teamed up with Fox and American Idol to create "Idol Gives Back," which raised over $70 million for various projects.
