= Haley Scarnato =

American singer (born 1982)

- Born: Haley Suzanne Scarnato; June 15, 1982 (age 44)
- Origin: San Antonio, Texas, United States
- Genres: Pop rock
- Years active: 2007–present
- Label: unsigned
- Formerly of: The Oh So Good! Band

Haley Suzanne Scarnato (born June 15, 1982) is an American singer who was the 8th-place finalist on the sixth season of American Idol.

== Early years ==
Scarnato was born in San Antonio, Texas to Rose and Anthony Scarnato. She was a young gymnast between the ages of 5 and 15. She attended Jack C. Jordan Middle School. After dislocating both of her shoulders, Scarnato moved on to other interests. Soon after, she found out that singing and music were her true passions and loves. She became a freelance singer, performing back up vocals with the Josephine Theatre (a local theater troupe), and singing in the band The Oh So Good! Band, a live wedding band in Texas. Haley graduated from William Howard Taft High School in San Antonio.

== American Idol ==
Scarnato auditioned for American Idol in her hometown of San Antonio, Texas. She sang Bonnie Raitt's "I Can't Make You Love Me". Paula Abdul said that she had real nice control of her voice and said that it was lovely. Randy thought it was just okay and Simon agreed by saying "you look good, you sound, it's a bit cabaret". Both Simon and Randy did not think she had much originality, but all three of them agreed that she did have a good voice and decided to let her through to Hollywood. While in Hollywood, she sang Celine Dion's "It's All Coming Back to Me Now" and Simon was very impressed with her vocals. In the group round she sang with fellow semi-finalists Amy Krebs and two other female contestants. Simon thought it was good, but said that he wasn't going to remember any of them. Scarnato made through to the top 40 then finally made it through to the top 24. On March 8, 2007, Scarnato was voted through to the top 12 over Sabrina Sloan, with whom she was roommates. Scarnato tended to get mixed reviews and was seemingly always in the bottom 3. She was eliminated from the show on April 11 after receiving the fewest votes during Latin Music Night, making her the first contestant in the top 8 to be eliminated after having been in the bottom two or three in any previous week.

=== American Idol performances ===
Week #	Theme	Song Choice	Original Artist	Order #	Result
Top 24 (12 Women)	Free Choice	"It's All Coming Back to Me Now"	Pandora's Box	8	Safe
Top 20 (10 Women)	Free Choice	"Queen of the Night"	Whitney Houston	9	Safe
Top 16 (8 Women)	Free Choice	"If My Heart Had Wings"	Faith Hill	4	Safe
Top 12	Diana Ross	"Missing You"	Diana Ross	6	Safe
Top 11	British Invasion	"Tell Him"	Billie Davis	1	Safe
Top 10	No Doubt/Artists who inspire Gwen Stefani	"True Colors"	Cyndi Lauper	5	Bottom 2^{1}
Top 9	American Classics	"Ain't Misbehavin'"	Fats Waller	8	Bottom 2^{2}
Top 8	Latin	"Turn the Beat Around"	Vicki Sue Robinson	4	Eliminated

- ^Note 1 When Ryan Seacrest announced the results in the particular night, Scarnato was among in the bottom three, but declared safe second when Chris Sligh was eliminated.
- ^Note 2 When Ryan Seacrest announced the results in the particular night, Scarnato was among in the bottom three, but declared safe second when Gina Glocksen was eliminated.

== Post-American Idol ==
On May 12, 2007, Scarnato sang the national anthem for Game 3 of the Western Conference basketball semifinals between the San Antonio Spurs and Phoenix Suns. On April 20, 2009, she sang the national anthem for Game 2 of the NBA Western Conference First Round between the San Antonio Spurs and the Dallas Mavericks.

On the May 25, 2007 edition of Larry King Live, it was stated that Scarnato and her fiancé would wed on January 5, 2008. On October 16, 2007 in an interview with MySanAntonio.com, Scarnato stated that she and her fiancé had broken up while she was on tour. During an interview on "The Late, Late Show with Craig Ferguson," broadcast on January 18, 2012, guest David Duchovny told a story about Haley Scarnato—specifically naming her—in which his then-young son was watching an "American Idol" episode. After seeing her performance, the child said, "She has a really good voice." Duchovny claimed that this indicated to him that his son was a heterosexual—based on the fact that Scarnato looked good but had a mediocre voice.

Haley's now-unavailable EP of studio version songs that she performed on American Idol was released on iTunes, along with all the other Top 12 contestants.

In 2008, Scarnato released her first single "Girls Night Out" which did not chart on any chart. In 2012, Scarnato released her new country single "How I Feel" written by Dan Hill and Keith Stegall.

Scarnato announced in an interview in November 2009 that her album Strongheart was scrapped after she left her management, but that she was working on a new album and "Strongheart" was her old management's idea.

== Discography ==
=== Singles ===
Year	Single	Album
2008	"Girl's Night Out"	StrongHeart (unreleased)
2012	"How I Feel"	TBA
