= Stephanie Edwards (singer) =

American singer

- Born: Stephanie Edwards; Savannah, Georgia, United States
- Genres: R&B
- Occupations: Singer, actress
- Years active: 2006-

Stephanie Edwards is an American singer and was the eleventh-place finalist on sixth season of American Idol. She is from Savannah, Georgia and first began singing around the age of two or three. After graduating from Windsor Forest High School, Edwards pursued vocal instruction for a month and then went on to appear at the Apollo Theatre in New York when she competed in "It's Showtime at the Apollo". Prior to American Idol, she had won most singing contests she had entered, including "Savannah Star" in 2005.

== American Idol ==
Edwards first auditioned for the reality show, American Idol, in Memphis, Tennessee. She is the only one of the top 12 contestants on Idol not presented in the TV tryouts preceding the naming of the top 24 semi-finalists.

During the initial broadcast for the Top 24, Edwards was praised for her rendition of “How Come U Don't Call Me Anymore,” by Prince. For her second semifinal performance, Edwards attempted the song “Dangerously in Love,” to which Randy Jackson exclaimed that she "sang her face off," although he felt her performance was too much like the original. The following week, Edwards pulled off another winning performance with the song "Sweet Thing". According to the judges, she was "darn near flawless and had a good command of the stage."

On March 8, 2007, Edwards made it into Top 12. For the first theme week, she performed Diana Ross' song "Love Hangover." Edwards forgot her words at one point during the song. The judges bashed her arrangement of the song, saying that she teased them with the good part and then never delivered. Despite the criticism, Edwards secured herself a spot in the Top 11.

She was eliminated from the show on March 21, 2007. She missed the summer tour along with Brandon Rogers.

== American Idol performances ==
Week #	Theme	Song choice	Original artist	Order #	Result
Top 24 (12 women)	N/A	"How Come U Don't Call Me Anymore?"	Prince	1	Safe
Top 20 (10 women)	N/A	"Dangerously in Love"	Beyoncé Knowles	7	Safe
Top 16 (8 women)	N/A	"Sweet Thing"	Rufus featuring Chaka Khan	5	Safe
Top 12	Diana Ross	"Love Hangover"	Diana Ross	10	Safe
Top 11	British Invasion	"You Don't Have to Say You Love Me"	Dusty Springfield	3	Eliminated

== Post-American Idol ==
After American Idol, Edwards recorded a charity single called "On Our Way" which was written by Julie Wilde and became available in early-October 2007 as a CD single on eBay. Sales of the album benefit the Leukemia and Lymphoma Society's Light the Night Walk . Her second single, "Here I Am", was also written by Wilde. It was released in April 2008. Edwards performed the song on American Idol Extra.

As of 2008, she was studying towards a psychology degree at Armstrong Atlantic State University.

In 2010, Edwards performed in the review show Southern Nights at the Savannah Theatre. She sang several classics, such as Georgia on My Mind, Midnight Train to Georgia and At Last.
