= Chris Sligh =

American Christian rock singer

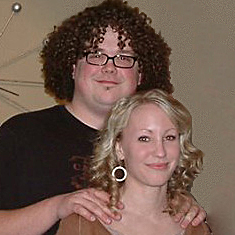
- Sligh and Sarah Sligh, his wife

Background information
- Born: Charles Christopher Sligh; April 13, 1978 (age 48); Madison, Tennessee
- Origin: Greenville, South Carolina, United States
- Genres: Christian rock, alternative rock
- Occupation: Singer
- Years active: 2007–present
- Formerly of: Half Past Forever
- Website: chrissligh.com

Charles Christopher Sligh (/ˈslaɪ/; born April 13, 1978) is an American singer, songwriter, producer and pastor who was a finalist on the sixth season of American Idol, finishing in tenth place. He has released 14 albums since 2001 as a solo artist, with his band Half Past Forever or with his former church's musical entity, Shoreline Music. He also starred in October Baby.

== Early years ==
Sligh was born in Madison, Tennessee, to Chuck and Susan Sligh, Baptist missionaries to American military servicemen. The family moved to Durham, North Carolina, when Sligh was three years old but soon moved to Wiesbaden, Germany, where Chuck ministered to American troops. Chuck Sligh is an accomplished guitarist and passed his love of music to his three sons, of whom Sligh is the oldest. Although Sligh has been singing since high school he grew up listening only to classical music in a regimented upbringing.

Sligh began his college study in pre-law at Pensacola Christian College in Florida. He transferred to Bob Jones University in Greenville, South Carolina, in his sophomore year intending to major in music. Despite having no previous formal instruction, Sligh progressed rapidly in the school's vocal performance program; he was invited to audition both for the Juilliard School and the Metropolitan Opera in New York City. Sligh was expelled from Bob Jones after he broke school rules. He then attended North Greenville University but left shy a few credits of earning a music degree.

== Half Past Forever ==
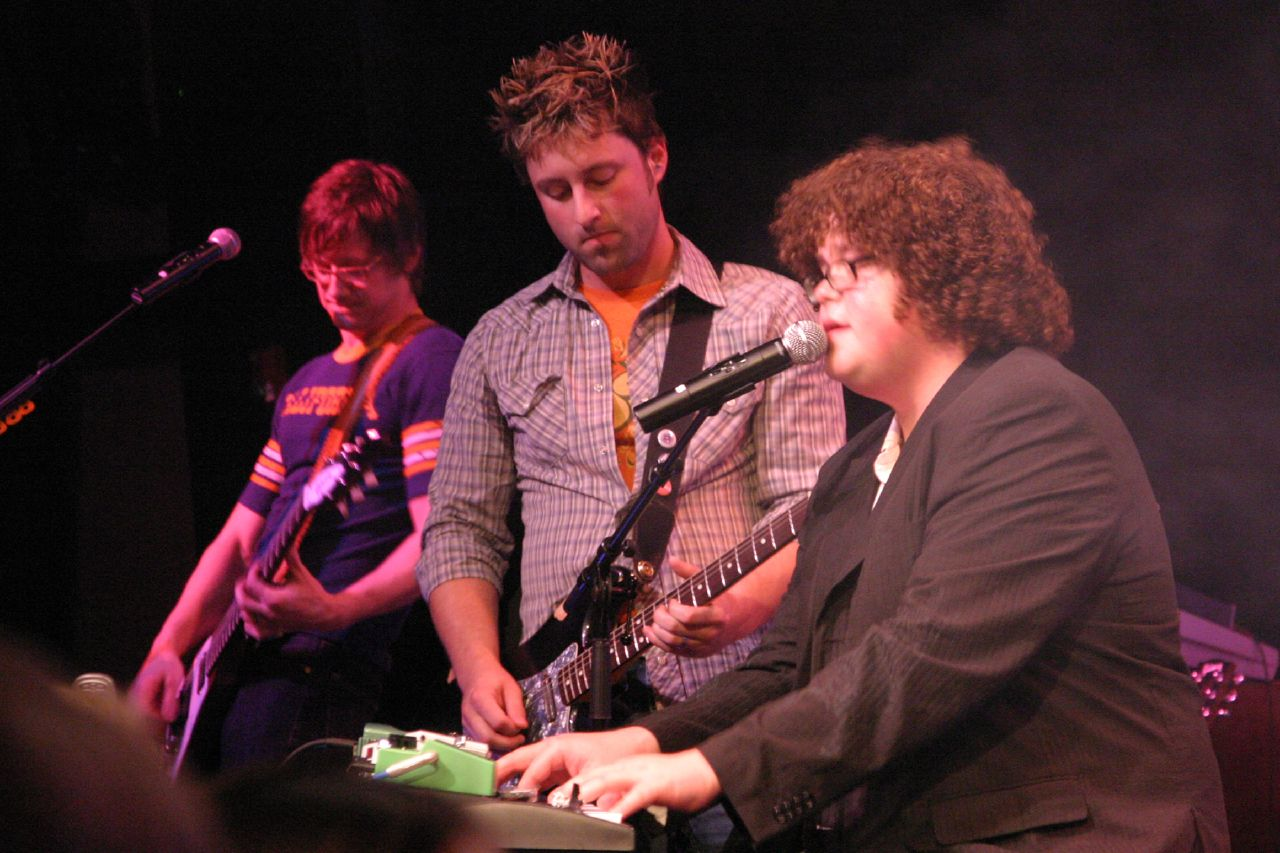
Sligh (right) performing with Half Past Forever in 2007

Over the next few years he put several bands together, leading eventually to the creation of the band Half Past Forever. Sligh was the frontman and guitarist for his band which was formed with a member of a defunct, local South Carolina band.

In 2006, they recorded the album, Take a Chance on Something Beautiful, which was produced over a few months in Sligh's home studio. After Sligh was voted off American Idol in March 2007, the band signed with record label Brash Music. Sligh produced, and wrote or co-wrote all of the album's seventeen songs. Jesusfreakhideout.com music critic Scott Fryberger reviewed the CD on July 7 saying, "Although a good mixture of adult contemporary and rock, Half Past Forever still isn't quite a must-buy album. It remains, however, a very good debut for the band. I wouldn't be surprised to hear them on mainstream radio stations in the near future."

On the other hand, critic Christa Bannister at Christianity Today.com reviewed the album, giving the album a solid 4/5 stars, saying "While the project is a little long by today's standards, there's actually not a throwaway in the bunch...The biggest surprise lies in the varied production, which is especially impressive for an indie band. They go all out with strings on the aforementioned "In a Moment," while faster songs like "Naïve" and "Closer" are reminiscent of The Strokes' latest project, with a more raw, stripped-down indie feel that offers nice contrast to overproduced pop."

== American Idol ==
Sligh auditioned in Birmingham, Alabama singing "Kiss from a Rose" by Seal, after which Paula Abdul gave him a standing ovation and said, "I like you very much." American Idol judges laughed at his ambition "to make David Hasselhoff cry," a reference to Hasselhoff's crying when Taylor Hicks won season 5.

Sligh was an early favorite of the judges, as all 3 judges spoke of a guy with curly hair who did not look like your typical American Idol. Abdul compared him to Penn Jillette from the duo of Penn & Teller, to whom he bears some resemblance. However, by the third week of the semi-finals, after Sligh sang "We All Wanna Be Loved" by DC Talk, the judges criticized him more sharply.

During the top 24 week, Sligh showed his extensive knowledge of American Idol trivia, which he claimed to have learned while researching for hours at his job in South Carolina. Simon Cowell claimed that Sligh's performance of "Typical" by the band Mutemath was "...like being at some weird student gig" and told Sligh that he felt like Sligh was there more on personality than vocal skill. Sligh retorted by saying, "Just because I don't sound like Il Divo or the Teletubbies doesn't mean that I don't have a good voice" alluding to Cowell's creation of the classical boy band Il Divo and his work in making an album featuring the Teletubbies. Randy Jackson and Abdul cheered at the supposed insult. Many fans were left bewildered by Cowell's dour reaction, which Sligh and Ryan Seacrest later cleared up in saying the dour expression was aimed at Seacrest.

Sligh was eliminated from American Idol on March 28, 2007 finishing in tenth-place. While he sang his last song, he told Phil Stacey "You owe me 50 bucks," referencing their bet that he would be eliminated that show. The next day, Sligh said that he had not sought to win the competition and that he had considered quitting the show two weeks before, but stayed on the show in order to make it into the top ten so that he could go on tour with the other top ten finalists. Later he commented that his wanting to quit was similar to anyone working a job and feeling like they could not do it anymore. He also addressed the rumor that he never wanted to win, saying, "I never set my sights on winning because it would've driven me crazy...I just focused on small goals, the first of which was to make the top 10 so I could go on tour."

=== Performances ===
Auditions/Hollywood

- Audition - "Kiss From a Rose" (Seal)
- Group Performance - "How Deep Is Your Love" (Bee Gees) (performed with Blake Lewis, Rudy Cardenas, and Tom Lowe)
- Final Round Performance - "Have You Ever Really Loved a Woman?" (Bryan Adams)

Week #	Theme	Song Choice	Original Artist	Order #	Result
Top 24 (12 Men)	N/A	"Typical"	Mutemath	9	Safe
Top 20 (10 Men)	N/A	"Trouble"	Ray LaMontagne	5	Safe
Top 16 (8 Men)	N/A	"Wanna Be Loved"	dc Talk	8	Safe
Top 12	Diana Ross	"Endless Love"	Diana Ross and Lionel Richie	3	Safe
Top 11	British Invasion	"She's Not There"	The Zombies	10	Safe
Top 10	No Doubt/Artists who inspire Gwen Stefani	"Every Little Thing She Does Is Magic"	The Police	2	Eliminated

== Career ==
In November 2007, Sligh stated that he had signed a solo deal with Brash Music, an Atlanta-based independent label that is distributed through Warner Bros., Alternative Distribution Alliance, and Word Distribution.

The album titled Running Back to You was produced by Brown Bannister, Stephen Leiweke and Will Owsley. Sligh's album was released on May 6, 2008 by Brash Music. The first official single, "Empty Me," was added to radio playlists February 22, 2008 and reached number six on the Billboard Hot Christian Songs Charts. The album debuted on the Billboard 200 at 190 with 4,000 copies sold the first week, the top Christian debut for the week. It has sold 54,000 copies in the U.S. as of October 2009.

The album has mostly positive reviews. USA Today called Sligh "the most musically ambitious Idol to date" and popular Christian website Jesus Freak Hideout gave the album 4.5 stars (out of 5) and called it "...one of the year's best albums". Other websites including The Bridge Live, CMCentral, Soul-Audio.com, and others gave the album glowing reviews, praising Sligh's songwriting, the album's production, and Sligh's soaring vocals which set him apart from the rest of the pack. The album reached number 190 on Billboard magazine's Top Heatseekers chart.

Through 2008 Sligh toured relentlessly, with over 115 shows and over 150 other appearances (radio, TV, and web interviews). In August and September 2008, he headlined the Back to School Tour. The tour went to 32 cities, most of which were partnered directly with Christian radio stations. In December 2008, Sligh toured with NewSong on the NewSong Christmas celebration tour. The tour hit 18 cities from December 1–22, 2008.

In March and April 2009, Sligh toured with Natalie Grant and Meredith Andrews on the Make It Matter Tour.

In April 2009, Sligh co-wrote a song called "Here Comes Goodbye" with Clint Lagerberg. This song was released by the country band Rascal Flatts. The song went number one after 12 weeks on the Billboard Hot Country Charts.

In May 2009, Sligh announced that he had parted ways with his label Brash Music and was "negotiating with a major label" for his next deal. His second album "Anatomy of the Broken" was released in September, 2010 on Word Records.

From September to November 2009, Sligh completed his second annual Back to School Tour, a co-headlining effort with Aaron Shust.

In November 2009 Sligh's first Christmas album became available on iTunes. In November he also announced details of his upcoming album, The Anatomy of Broken, which was released on September 14, 2010. The album peaked at number 44 on the Billboard Top Christian Albums Chart.

Sligh made his acting debut in the movie October Baby as B-Mac. He performed "Broken (Beautiful)," "One", and "Willow Tree" for the soundtrack.

In 2011, Sligh left Warner Brothers/Word Records. He was hired at Rocky Mountain Christian Church in Niwot, Colorado as a worship minister. Sligh released his third album, For Our God & King, and a 37-song triple album This Is Life.

In 2013, Sligh and his family moved to Austin, Texas, where took a position as a worship minister and later the creative director of Shoreline Church. He built a songwriting and production division of the church called Shoreline Music and featured on the album No Height, No Depth, which came out in 2015.

In 2016, Sligh and family moved to Chicago where he was the executive creative director at Parkview Christian Church. At the end of 2016, Sligh left his job at the church around the time of releasing Mighty Roar / Healing Flood in December 2016. The album received positive reviews by major Christian publications: it received 4 of 5 stars by New Release Today 4 of 5 stars by CCM Magazine and 3.5 of 5 star by JesusFreakHideout plus a 9/10 rating by CrossRhythms Magazine. The album also garnered Sligh a nomination for JesusFreakHideout's Pop Album of the Year.

In 2017, Sligh returned to touring and played over forty shows. In April 2018, he released A Modern Liturgy. The album followed up Mighty Roar / Healing Flood with equally great reviews: JesusFreakHideout gave it 4/5 stars, CCM Magazine again gave a Sligh album 4/4 stars.

In 2018, Sligh produced the majority of an EP for Curt Anderson and wrote and produced for Jenna Long.

In 2019, Sligh partnered with Worship Tutorials to release a series of videos.

In 2021, the Feckers released their third album, Courage of Conviction Part I: Picking Up the Pieces and Sligh sang on the duet, "Picking Up the Pieces."

As of December 2023, Sligh was focused more on songwriting than performing.

== Discography ==
=== Albums ===
Year	Album	Sales
2001	Berg: Vessel as Berg (Chris Sligh)	
2002	Someone Just Like You	
2005	Half Past Forever (with Half Past Forever)	
2005	Besides... (with Half Past Forever)	
2007	Take a Chance on Something Beautiful (with Half Past Forever)	1,700
2008	Running Back to You	54,000
2009	Christmas EP	
2010	The Anatomy of Broken	10,000
2012	For Our God and King	
2013	This Is Life (three album set)	
2015	Shoreline Music - No Height, No Depth	
2016	Mighty Roar / Healing Flood	
2018	A Modern Liturgy	
2019	Sing, Vol. 1	

=== Singles ===
Year	Single	Peak	sales	Album
Year	Single	US Christ	sales	Album
2007	"Hero"	—		Take a Chance On Something Beautiful
2008	"Empty Me"	6	52,000	Running Back to You
2008	"Arise"	30		Running Back to You
2010	"Only You Can Save"	13	10,000	The Anatomy of Broken
"—" denotes the single failed to chart or not released
