= Syesha Mercado =

American actress, model and musician

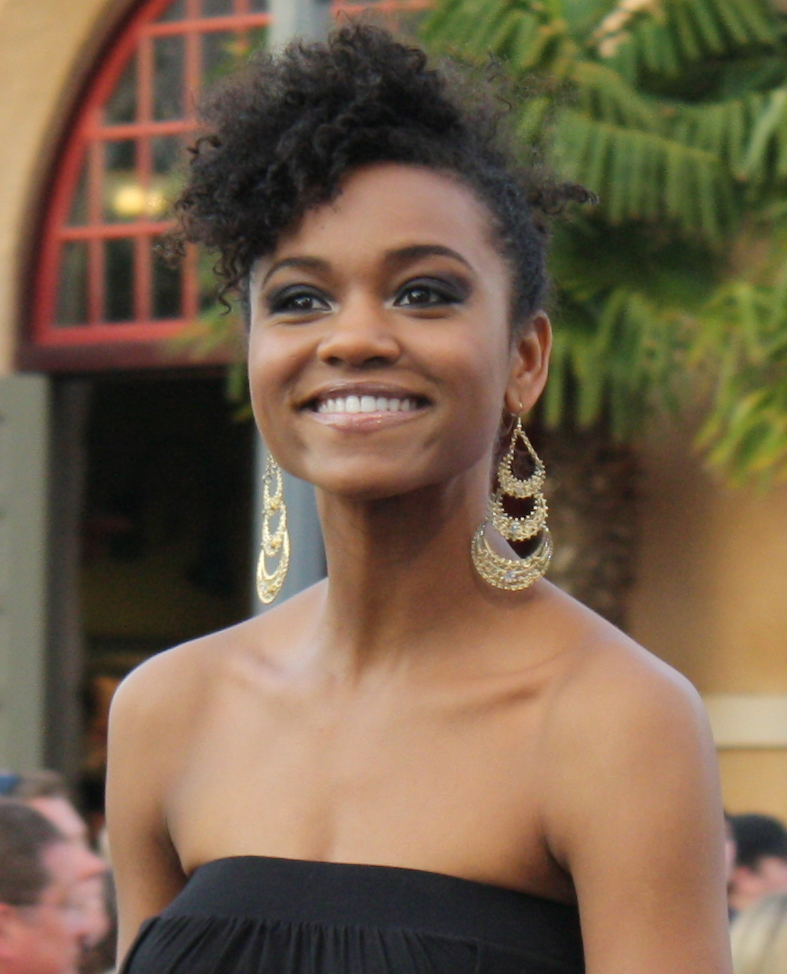
- Mercado in the American Idol Experience motorcade at Walt Disney World.

Background information
- Born: Syesha Raquel Mercado; January 2, 1987 (age 39); Bridgeport, Connecticut
- Origin: Sarasota, Florida, United States
- Genres: R&B; soul; pop
- Occupations: Singer-songwriter; actress; model
- Years active: 2006–present
- Website: www.SyeshaOnline.com

Syesha Raquel Mercado (born January 2, 1987) is an American singer-songwriter, actress, and model. Mercado placed third during the seventh season of American Idol. Prior to American Idol, Mercado was on The One: Making a Music Star and she won Florida Super Singer. Her musical influences are Whitney Houston, Etta James, Alicia Keys, Zap Mama, Lauryn Hill, and Aretha Franklin.

Mercado played Deena Jones in the United States national tour of Dreamgirls that also opened internationally in Japan. The tour began at the Apollo Theater on November 7, 2009.

== Biography ==
=== Early life ===
Mercado was born in Bridgeport, Connecticut, on January 2, 1987. Her mother, Zelda, a former Motown backup singer, is African American and her father, José, is of Puerto Rican descent. Mercado grew up in Bradenton and Sarasota, Florida. She attended the Theatre Program at Booker High School for the Visual and Performing Arts. She graduated with a certificate as a performance major in Sarasota, where she appeared in various productions. At the 2005 Florida Theatre Conference and the 2005 South Eastern Theatre Conference, Mercado won "Best Supporting Actress" for her role as the Sour Kangaroo in Seussical the Musical. Mercado also appeared as a contestant on the failed ABC talent show, The One: Making a Music Star in summer 2006.

=== Education ===
Mercado attended Daughtrey Elementary School and Manatee School for the Arts both in Manatee County. Dreaming of becoming a gospel singer one day, Mercado signed a contract at age nine with the Take Stock in Children, a scholarship program for "low-income families who show potential for college, but are unlikely to be able to afford a higher education." Mercado graduated from Booker High School in 2005, where she was in the Theatre Visual and Performing Arts department. She also attended Florida International University in Miami, majoring in theatre.

== Personal life ==
Mercado is best friends with former idol contestant Ramiele Malubay. In 2021, her infant son was put in foster care over concerns about malnutrition. In 2023, two years after the ordeal and she says that the "healing process is something that will take a lifetime to deal with."

== The One: Making a Music Star ==
=== Performances/results ===
Week #	Song choice	Original artist	Result
Top 11	"Chain of Fools"	Aretha Franklin	Advanced
Top 10	"If I Ain't Got You"	Alicia Keys	Advanced^{A}

- ^Note A: The show was cancelled after Top 10 week.

== Florida Super Singer ==
=== Performances/results ===
Week #	Song choice	Original artist	Result
Top 5	"Think"	Aretha Franklin	Advanced
Top 2	"The Trouble with Love Is"	Kelly Clarkson	Winner^{A}

- ^Note A: Based on 3 Judges, text message and internet votes. 2,000,000 in total

== American Idol ==
=== Overview ===
She auditioned for the seventh season of American Idol in Miami, Florida, singing "Think" by Aretha Franklin where she made it to Hollywood with all three judges saying 'yes'. When she arrived in Hollywood she had lost her voice and insisted on going on vocal rest. She was seen communicating through paper and pen to the camera throughout the week. She sang "Chain of Fools" and was accepted into the top 24. She was the only female in the top three and was voted off on May 14 allowing fellow contestants David Archuleta and David Cook to compete in the finale. She thus joined Kimberley Locke and Jax as the female contestants to get voted off in the top three to allow two male contestants to compete in the finale.

Despite good reviews from the judges, Mercado had been in the bottom three or two five times without being voted off. This meant a tie with first season fellow 3rd place finalist, Nikki McKibbin, for the most weeks spent in the bottom three or two at the time. Later, fourteen season fourth place finalist, Rayvon Owen, was featured in that same position six different times. Some commentators, including American Idol judge Simon Cowell, believed her style was more suited for Broadway than pop music.

=== Performances/results ===
Week #	Theme	Song choice	Original artist	Order #	Result
Audition	N/A	"Think"	Aretha Franklin	N/A	Advanced
Hollywood	N/A	"(Everything I Do) I Do It for You"	Bryan Adams	N/A	Advanced
Top 80	N/A	"Chain of Fools"	Aretha Franklin	N/A	Advanced
Top 24 (12 Women)	1960s	"Tobacco Road"	The Nashville Teens	11	Safe
Top 20 (10 Women)	1970s	"Me and Mr. Jones"	Billy Paul	2	Safe
Top 16 (8 Women)	1980s	"Saving All My Love for You"	Whitney Houston	8	Safe
Top 12	Lennon–McCartney	"Got to Get You into My Life"	The Beatles	1	Bottom 3^{1}
Top 11	The Beatles	"Yesterday"	The Beatles	9	Safe
Top 10	Year They Were Born	"If I Were Your Woman"	Stephanie Mills	3	Bottom 2^{2}
Top 9	Dolly Parton	"I Will Always Love You"	Dolly Parton	8	Safe
Top 8	Inspirational Music	"I Believe"	Fantasia	2	Bottom 3^{3}
Top 7	Mariah Carey	"Vanishing"	Mariah Carey	3	Bottom 3^{1}
Top 6	Andrew Lloyd Webber	"One Rock & Roll Too Many"	Starlight Express	1	Bottom 2^{4}
Top 5	Neil Diamond	"Hello Again" "Thank the Lord for the Night Time"	Neil Diamond	5; 10	Safe
Top 4	Rock and Roll Hall of Fame	"Proud Mary" "A Change Is Gonna Come"	Creedence Clearwater Revival; Sam Cooke	2; 6	Safe
Top 3	Judge's Choice (Randy Jackson); Contestant's Choice; Producer's Choice	"If I Ain't Got You" "Fever" "Hit Me Up"	Alicia Keys; Little Willie John; Gia Farrell	2; 5; 8	Eliminated

- ^Note 1: Mercado was saved first from elimination.
- ^Note 2: When Ryan Seacrest announced the results for this particular night, Mercado was among the Bottom 3 but declared safe second when Chikezie was eliminated.
- ^Note 3: When revealing the results, Seacrest simultaneously declared Mercado and Carly Smithson safe, as Michael Johns was eliminated.
- ^Note 4: When Ryan Seacrest announced the results for this particular night, Mercado was among the Bottom 2 but declared safe when Carly Smithson was eliminated.

== Post-Idol career ==
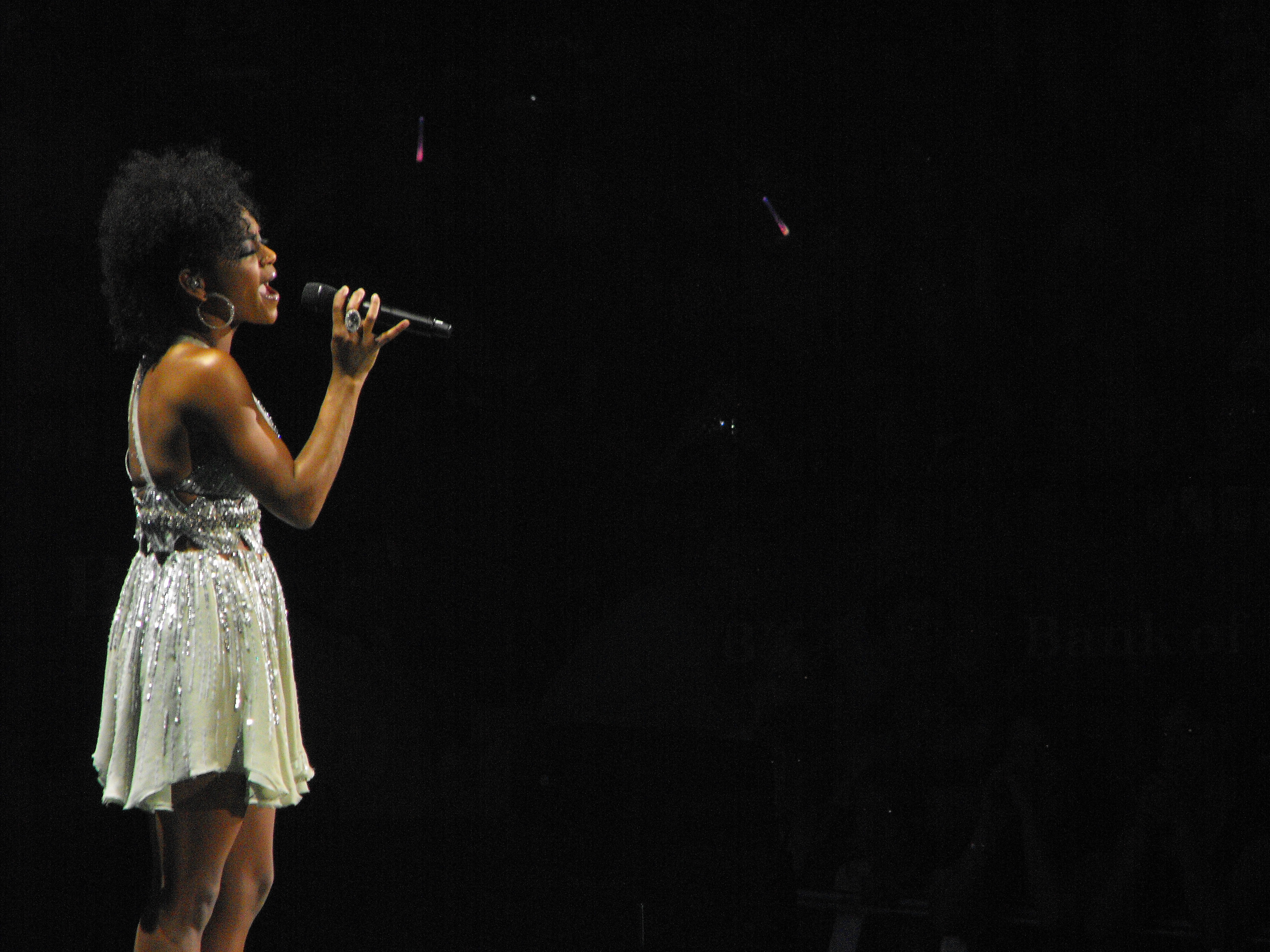
Mercado performing during the American Idols Live! Tour 2008.

After her elimination, Mercado appeared on Live with Regis and Kelly, The Morning Show with Mike and Juliet and WSVN's Deco Drive. She completed the American Idols Live! Tour 2008 which ran from July 1, 2008, to September 13, 2008. The songs she performed on the tour were "Umbrella" by Rihanna, "If I Ain't Got You" by Alicia Keys and "Listen" by Beyoncé.

In November 2008, she performed "One Rock and Roll Too Many" in the 6abc IKEA Thanksgiving Day Parade. She was the guest host of the WSVN 7 yacht at the 37th annual Seminole Hard Rock Winterfest Boat parade on December 13, 2008. She sang "The Star-Spangled Banner" at the Miami Dolphins and the San Francisco 49ers game on Fox on December 14, 2008. On December 20, 2008, she assisted the Habitat for Humanity in building homes for struggling families in Miramar, Florida.

In February 2009, she participated in the opening of the American Idol Experience attraction at Disney's Hollywood Studios.

Mercado also performed in concert events, including the Orchestra in the Outfield with the Sarasota Orchestra in 2015, and appeared in the 2013 independent film Dreams.

=== Theatre ===
In 2009, she was cast as Deena Jones in a revival of Dreamgirls, which opened at the Apollo Theater in New York and toured nationally from November 7, 2009 to December 29, 2010. On November 4, 2009, Mercado appeared on The Wendy Williams Show to promote the tour.

Mercado then starred as Ti Moune in the revival of Once on This Island at the Paper Mill Playhouse in Millburn, New Jersey. Opening night was May 30, 2012, on a run through June 24.

Mercado performed in the Chicago transfer production of Broadway musical Book of Mormon. She was a late addition to the cast, replacing Stephanie Umoh during rehearsals in the role of Nabulungi. From January to June 2014, Mercado reprised the role, making it her Broadway debut.

== Discography ==
Singles

- "Christmas Melody" (2011)
- "Tears" (2017)
