= TSIC =

TSIC may refer to:

== Organizations ==
- Take Stock in Children, a nonprofit organization based in Miami, Florida, United States
- Telia Carrier, formerly named TeliaSonera International Carrier
- The Social Investment Consultancy, a consultancy firm found in UK
