= American Idols Live! Tour 2008 =

2008 North American summer concert tour

- Tour by American Idol
- Back – Ramiele Malubay, David Archuleta Middle – Kristy Lee Cook, Carly Smithson, David Cook, Jason Castro, Syesha Mercado, Michael Johns Front – Chikezie, Brooke White
- Start date: July 1, 2008
- End date: September 13, 2008
- No. of shows: 53
- Box office: US$29.9 million

American Idol concert chronology
- American Idols Live! Tour 2007 (2007); American Idols Live! Tour 2008 (2008); American Idols Live! Tour 2009 (2009)

American Idols Live! Tour 2008 was a summer concert tour in the United States and Canada that featured the top 10 contestants of the seventh season of American Idol, which aired in 2008. This tour followed in the tradition of other American Idol summer tours following the completion of the season in May. The 53-date tour started in Glendale and ended in Tulsa.

The tour was sponsored by Kellogg's Pop-Tarts and Guitar Hero.

== Performers ==
David Cook (winner)	David Archuleta (runner-up)
Syesha Mercado (3rd Place)	Jason Castro (4th place)
Brooke White (5th place)	Carly Smithson (6th place)
Kristy Lee Cook (7th place)	Michael Johns (8th place)
Ramiele Malubay (9th place)	Chikezie (10th place)

== Show overview ==
In a departure from previous tours, where the shows consisted of many duets and/or group performances, shows from this tour were crafted as a series of mini-concerts for each contestant because of the diverse talent working in different genres.

The participants of the tour themselves had planned on an ensemble performance as revealed by David Cook on EW.com's Idolatry, where the possibility of a live collaboration of "Barracuda" featuring himself on guitar, Jason Castro on drums and Carly Smithson on vocals was mooted. The suggestion was however rejected by Idol tour producers.

== Set list ==
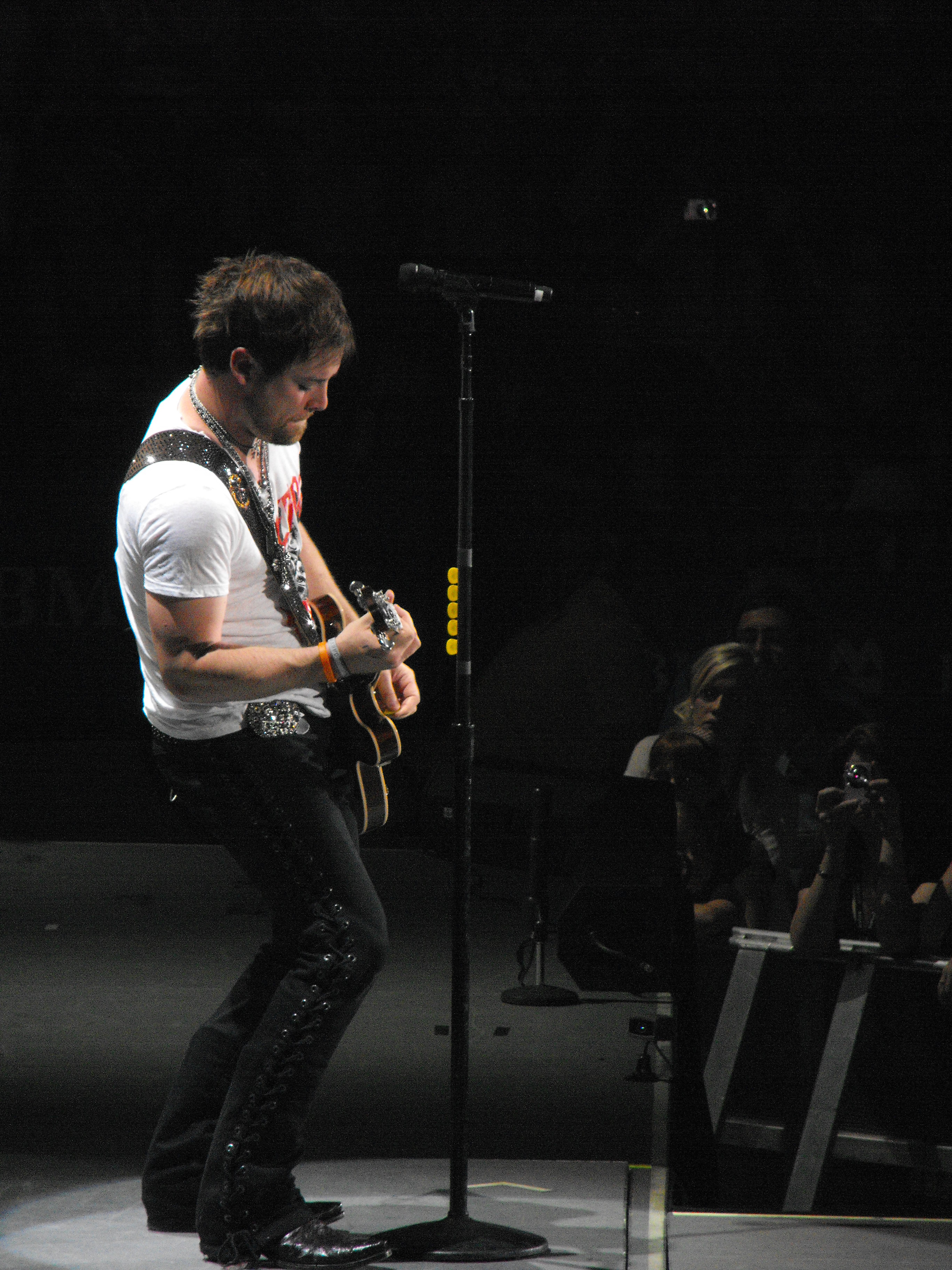
David Cook performing during the American Idols Live! Tour 2008.

- Chikezie: "I Believe to My Soul" (Donny Hathaway), "Caught Up" (Usher), "So High" (John Legend)
- Ramiele Malubay: "I Want You Back" (The Jackson Five), "Love Will Lead You Back" (Taylor Dayne), "If I Never See Your Face Again" (Maroon 5 featuring Rihanna)
- Michael Johns: "We Will Rock You"/"We Are the Champions" (Queen), "It's All Wrong, But It's All Right" (Dolly Parton), "Dream On" (Aerosmith)
- Kristy Lee Cook: "Squeezin' the Love Outta You" (Redmon and Vale), "God Bless the USA" (Lee Greenwood), "Cowgirls" (Kerry Harvick).
- Carly Smithson: "Bring Me to Life" (Evanescence), "Crazy on You" (Heart), "I Drove All Night" (Cyndi Lauper)
- Brooke White: "Let It Be" (The Beatles), "1234" (Feist), "Yellow" (Coldplay)
- 10th – 5th place contestants: "Pride (In the Name of Love)" (U2)

Intermission

- Jason Castro: "Over the Rainbow" (Israel Kamakawiwo'ole), "Crazy" (Gnarls Barkley), "Daydream" (The Lovin' Spoonful)
- Syesha Mercado: "Umbrella" (Rihanna), "If I Ain't Got You" (Alicia Keys), "Listen" (Beyoncé)
- David Archuleta: "Angels" (Robbie Williams), "Apologize" (OneRepublic), "Stand by Me" (Ben E. King)/"Beautiful Girls" (Sean Kingston), "When You Say You Love Me" (Josh Groban)
- David Cook: "Hello" (Lionel Richie), "The Time of My Life" (David Cook), "I Don't Want to Miss a Thing" (Aerosmith), "My Hero" (Foo Fighters), "Billie Jean" (Michael Jackson/Chris Cornell)
- All 10 contestants: "Don't Stop the Music" (Rihanna)

== Additional notes ==
- During the intermission, a video of the Top 10 performing "We're An American Idol Band" in 1970s outfits was shown as part of the Guitar Hero World Tour rockumentary, and a Guitar Hero contest for the some members of audience was held.

== Tour dates ==
Date	City	Country	Venue
July 1, 2008	Glendale	United States	Jobing.com Arena
July 2, 2008	San Diego	United States	San Diego Sports Arena
July 3, 2008	Fresno	United States	Save Mart Center
July 5, 2008	Las Vegas	United States	Thomas & Mack Center
July 7, 2008	Los Angeles	United States	Staples Center
July 8, 2008	San Jose	United States	HP Pavilion at San Jose
July 9, 2008	Sacramento	United States	ARCO Arena
July 11, 2008	Portland	United States	Rose Garden
July 12, 2008	Tacoma	United States	Tacoma Dome
July 14, 2008	West Valley City	United States	E Center
July 15, 2008	West Valley City	United States	E Center
July 18, 2008	St. Louis	United States	Scottrade Center
July 19, 2008	Rosemont	United States	Allstate Arena
July 20, 2008	Columbus	United States	Schottenstein Center
July 22, 2008	Indianapolis	United States	Conseco Fieldhouse
July 23, 2008	Cincinnati	United States	U.S. Bank Arena
July 24, 2008	Detroit	United States	Joe Louis Arena
July 26, 2008	Toronto	Canada	Air Canada Centre
July 27, 2008	Rochester	United States	Blue Cross Arena
July 29, 2008	Pittsburgh	United States	Mellon Arena
July 30, 2008	Newark	United States	Prudential Center
July 31, 2008	Newark	United States	Prudential Center
August 2, 2008	Atlantic City	United States	Boardwalk Hall
August 4, 2008	Uniondale	United States	Nassau Coliseum
August 5, 2008	Uniondale	United States	Nassau Coliseum
August 6, 2008	Albany	United States	Times Union Center
August 8, 2008	Hartford	United States	XL Center
August 9, 2008	Worcester	United States	DCU Center
August 10, 2008	Manchester	United States	Verizon Wireless Arena
August 12, 2008	Baltimore	United States	1st Mariner Arena
August 13, 2008	Philadelphia	United States	Wachovia Center
August 14, 2008	Washington, D.C.	United States	Verizon Center
August 16, 2008	Lexington	United States	Rupp Arena
August 17, 2008	Charlotte	United States	Time Warner Cable Arena
August 18, 2008	Duluth	United States	Arena at Gwinnett Center
August 20, 2008	Sunrise	United States	BankAtlantic Center
August 21, 2008	Tampa	United States	St. Pete Times Forum
August 24, 2008	Houston	United States	Toyota Center
August 25, 2008	Dallas	United States	American Airlines Center
August 26, 2008	Bossier City	United States	CenturyTel Center
August 28, 2008	Oklahoma City	United States	Ford Center
August 29, 2008	Kansas City	United States	Sprint Center
August 30, 2008	Kansas City	United States	Sprint Center
August 31, 2008	Minneapolis	United States	Target Center
September 2, 2008	Green Bay	United States	Resch Center
September 3, 2008	Grand Rapids	United States	Van Andel Arena
September 4, 2008	Cleveland	United States	Wolstein Center
September 6, 2008	Bridgeport	United States	Arena at Harbor Yard
September 7, 2008	Providence	United States	Dunkin' Donuts Center
September 8, 2008	Wilkes-Barre	United States	Wachovia Arena
September 10, 2008	Fort Wayne	United States	Allen County War Memorial Coliseum
September 11, 2008	Evansville	United States	Roberts Municipal Stadium
September 13, 2008	Tulsa	United States	BOK Center

== Response ==
The 2008 tour was far more successful than 2007's. Sales were up 38% in revenue per date and average attendance number up 35% compared to 2007. The average percentage of seats filled was 85.1% compared to season six's 68.4%; and 9 out of 53 shows were sold out.

It is ranked as the 24th biggest grossing tour of 2008 on Billboard's Year-End Music Charts, earning $29,906,507 from a total of 493,296 tickets sold.

== Idols in Concert for the Holidays ==
Due to the success of the 2008 tour, Fox and 19 Entertainment have decided to hold a tour called Idols in Concert for the Holidays. The former Idol contestants headlining the tour include David Hernandez (season 7), Diana DeGarmo (season 3), Kimberley Locke (season 2) and Chikezie (season 7).

Date	City	Venue
November 29, 2008	Pittsburgh	Byham Theater
December 1, 2008	El Paso	Kendle Kidd Performance Hall
December 4, 2008	Englewood	Bergen Performing Arts Center
December 10, 2008	Salem	Salem Civic Center
December 11, 2008	Mobile	Mitchell Center
December 19, 2008	Akron	E.J. Thomas Hall
December 20, 2008	Davenport	Adler Theatre
December 21, 2008	Waukegan	Genesee Theatre
