= David Hernandez (singer) =

American singer

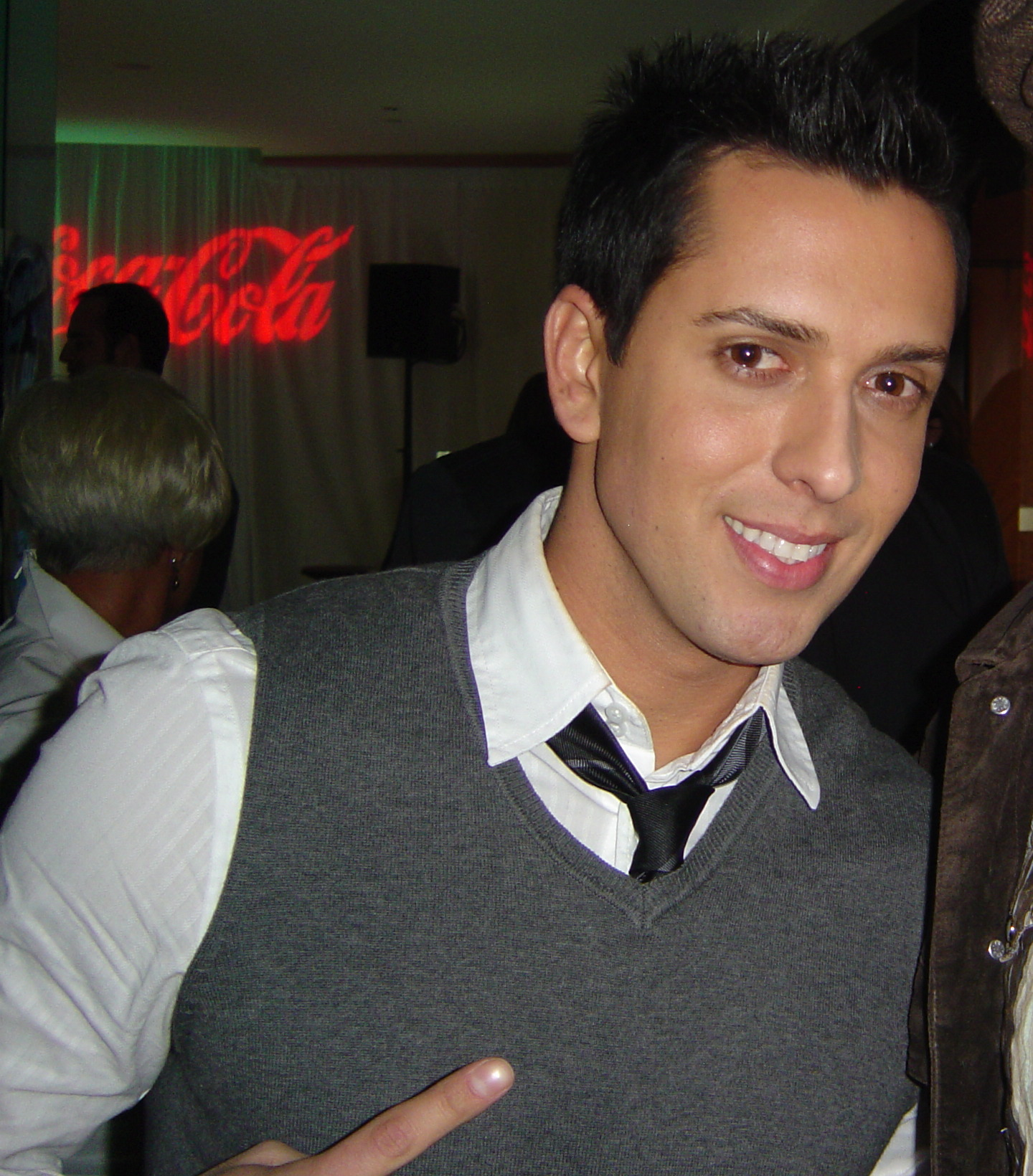
- David Hernandez at the American Idol, Season 7, Top 12 after party on March 6, 2008.

Background information
- Born: David Anthony Hernandez; May 31, 1983 (age 43); Phoenix, Arizona
- Origin: Glendale, Arizona, United States
- Genres: Soul, R&B, pop, gospel
- Occupations: Musician, singer-songwriter
- Years active: 2008–present
- Label: Pending

David Anthony Hernandez (born May 31, 1983) is an American singer and the twelfth place finalist of FOX's seventh season of the television series American Idol. He moved to Los Angeles, California to pursue his music career after his time on American Idol.

== Early life ==
Hernandez was born in Phoenix, Arizona, but grew up mostly in Glendale. He was raised by his single mom, Spring Hernandez. His father is a truck driver and he has a younger sister named Alexandra, 8 years his junior.

He began singing at age six. His grandfather took him to his first audition for a local theater company, Valley Youth Theater. David was chosen for one of the lead roles, and decided on a career singing and performing. Hernandez used to train at Voices, a vocal coaching studio. His teacher claimed that Hernandez trained "whenever he could afford it" as he wasn't always financially stable.

He was a young gymnast and won medals in the Grand Canyon Olympics. Hernandez had some acting experiences and was in an independent film before American Idol. He also once had aspiration of becoming an entertainment show host.

As a teenager, Hernandez went to a college in Tucson, Arizona. During college, he had a job selling knives door-to-door. He was a student at Arizona State University, majoring in broadcast journalism.

Before American Idol, he worked various jobs, including singing on cruise ships, working as a server at a pizza bistro, and working at night clubs. Hernandez also used to sing with a local Phoenix cover group called Tribe 7.

== Musical influences ==
On his American Idol "Fast Facts" page, David cites musical influences as: Stevie Wonder, Donny Hathaway, Alicia Keys, Anthony Hamilton, Michael Jackson, Peabo Bryson. When asked to list his top pop artists, he cites; Alicia Keys, Stevie Wonder, Peabo Bryson. He also cites Fantasia Barrino and Kelly Clarkson as his favorite former American Idol contestants. Randy Jackson claimed after one of his performances on American Idol that Hernandez has a Stevie Wonder vibe coming from his singing style. Hernandez himself described his sound as pop and R&B influenced.

== Musical background ==
David Hernandez was once part of a singing group called Vinyl Four which consisted of four singers prior to his appearance on American Idol. The group performed on the cruise ships. Hernandez also has performed with the Latin/R&B bands Tribe 7 and Straight up. Prior to his participation on American Idol, Hernandez has performed at Urban Network Events, Arizona Idol and at a Martin Luther King Jr. Day parade. He was a finalist in Arizona Idol (the winner of the competition secures a chance to audition for FOX's American Idol). After failing to take first place, he traveled to San Diego to audition successfully for the seventh season of American Idol.

== American Idol ==
Hernandez auditioned for American Idol season 7 at San Diego, California, singing "Ain't Too Proud to Beg" in front of the judges. All the three judges loved his audition and let him advance to the Hollywood round. In Hollywood, he sang "Love the One You're With" for his audition and received unanimous praise from the three judges. Hernandez was finally chosen as one of the Top 24 semi-finalists for season 7 (albeit with some hesitance from Simon).

During the first week of the semi-finals, Hernandez was the first contestant to perform. He performed "In the Midnight Hour" and was voted through the next round. During the top 20-week, he performed The Temptations' "Papa Was a Rollin' Stone". This performance received praises from all the three judges and converted Simon Cowell into a fan. His "Papa Was a Rollin' Stone" was both vocally convincing and demonstrated a degree of showmanship that he had previously been missing. After performing "It's All Coming Back to Me Now" during the Top 16-week, Paula Abdul claimed that he has one of the best vocals in the competition. Simon added that he definitely secured his place in the finals on that. Hernandez was voted through to the Top 12 the following day.

Hernandez, considered by some an early favorite, was the first member of the Top 12 to be eliminated, on March 12, 2008. Hernandez, along with 11th-place finisher Amanda Overmyer, did not perform on the annual summer tour.

Hernandez was revealed to have worked as a nude male stripper at a gay strip club, called Dick's Cabaret, in Phoenix, Arizona. No disclosure of his career as a stripper was made by Fox prior to the release and he was allowed to remain on the show. American Idol has had female former strippers in the show before and has not held the work against them.

=== Performances and results (during voting weeks) ===
Week #	Theme	Song choice	Original artist	Order #	Result
Top 24 (12 Men)	1960s	"In the Midnight Hour"	Wilson Pickett	1	Safe
Top 20 (10 Men)	1970s	"Papa Was a Rollin' Stone"	The Undisputed Truth	6	Safe
Top 16 (8 Men)	1980s	"It's All Coming Back to Me Now"	Pandora's Box	4	Safe
Top 12	Lennon–McCartney	"I Saw Her Standing There"	The Beatles	8	Eliminated

== Post Idol ==
After he was eliminated on American Idol, David Hernandez made various appearances on The Ellen DeGeneres Show (where he performed the song "In the Midnight Hour") Today Show, Access Hollywood, TRL, and TV Guide Network's Idol Tonight. He was subsequently asked to perform at The Children's Hospital of New York Presbyterian where he sang "Papa Was a Rollin' Stone" and "In the Midnight Hour."

Hernandez sang the National Anthem at US Airways Centre on April 4, 2008, for the Phoenix RoadRunners hockey game finals. On May 1, 2008, Hernandez made an appearance at TV Guide's Sexiest Stars 2008 Party.

Hernandez stated that he had hoped to have an album out by 2009. He claimed that his first album is definitely going to be pop- and R&B-influenced, and he would like to write his own songs on the album. "It's definitely going to be an eclectic kind of vibe. I'd like to put a little bit of rock and R&B in it too. That's the kind of image I want to put out there. I'm more of an R&B, grit-and-grind kind of singer."

Hernandez toured with Diana DeGarmo, Kimberley Locke and Chikezie on a 20-city Idol Holiday Tour from November 28, 2008, through December 21, 2008. Hernandez has appeared on the CBS Early Show and performed on FOX's The Morning Show with Mike and Juliet. He finished a run performing his own show at the upscale nightclub Barcelona Scottsdale, located in Scottsdale, Arizona in June 2009. Hernandez opened for John Legend at the Declare Yourself Inaugural Ball in Washington, D.C., on January 18, 2009. He collaborates with sideman Shea Marshall for private performances around the Western US and Canada. Hernandez toured with Gina Glocksen, Michael Sarver and Alexis Grace in "The American Stars in Concert 2009" and released his first Christmas record entitled "This Christmas." Hernandez headlined a New Year's Eve show at the Greek Isle Hotel & Casino in Las Vegas, with Mikalah Gordon and Dezmond Meeks. He rejoined the "Ballroom with a Twist" tour in mid-January 2010 that extended its run through March 2010. He was in "Motown Memories", a Motown tribute show located in Scottsdale, Arizona at the Talking Stick Casino & Resort that ran until April 30, 2011. He then rejoined "Ballroom with a Twist" alongside Gina Glocksen for a three-month run in Las Vegas, Nevada, while also continuing the "American Stars in Concert 2011" Tour with Lakisha Jones, Gina Glocksen, Michael Sarver and Alexis Grace. Hernandez has been reported to be working with Printz Board of The Black Eyed Peas on a single. Hernandez performed at San Jose Pride Festival on August 18, 2013.

In 2021, Hernandez replaced Aaron Carter as the headliner of the nude male musical revue Naked Boys Singing in Las Vegas, for a three-month residency beginning September 15, 2021.

== Personal life ==
Hernandez came out as gay after releasing his single "Beautiful".
