= American Idol season 7 =

American Idol
- Season 7
- Hosted by: Ryan Seacrest
- Judges: Paula Abdul; Simon Cowell; Randy Jackson
- Winner: David Cook
- Runner-up: David Archuleta
- Finals venue: Nokia Theatre L.A. Live

Release
- Original network: Fox
- Original release: January 15 – May 21, 2008

Season chronology
- ← Previous; Season 6 Next → Season 8

The seventh season of American Idol began on January 15, 2008 and concluded on May 21, 2008. Ryan Seacrest continued to host the show, while Simon Cowell, Paula Abdul, and Randy Jackson returned as judges. David Cook was announced as the winner on May 21, 2008, defeating runner-up David Archuleta by a margin of roughly 12 million votes out of over 97 million, which was at that time the highest recorded vote total in the show's history.

== Changes from previous seasons ==
Prior to the start of the seventh season, executive producer Nigel Lythgoe admitted that the sixth season had placed more focus on the guest mentors than the contestants. Changes were planned for the seventh season designed to return attention to the contestants by providing more information on their backgrounds and families.

In a major change for the seventh season, contestants were allowed to play musical instruments, an element which originated on Australian Idol. A brand new set was built, and a new introduction credit sequence was created. The season finale also moved from the Kodak Theatre to the larger Nokia Theatre in Los Angeles, which became the venue for the live series finale for the next six years.

== Regional auditions ==
For the seventh season, auditions began in San Diego, California, on July 30, 2007, and continued in these cities:

American Idol (season 7) – regional auditions
City	Preliminary date	Preliminary venue	Filming date(s)	Filming venue	Golden tickets
San Diego, California	July 30, 2007	Qualcomm Stadium	September 12–13, 2007	Rancho Bernardo Inn	31
Dallas, Texas	August 6, 2007	Texas Stadium	September 20–23, 2007	W Hotel Dallas Victory	24
Omaha, Nebraska	August 10, 2007	Qwest Center Omaha	October 5–6, 2007	Qwest Convention Center	19
Atlanta, Georgia	August 14, 2007	Georgia Dome	October 8–10, 2007	Georgia International Convention Center	21
Charleston, South Carolina	August 18, 2007	North Charleston Coliseum	September 6–7, 2007	Charleston Area Convention Center	23
Miami, Florida	August 22, 2007	American Airlines Arena	September 29–30, 2007	JW Marriott Hotel	17
Philadelphia, Pennsylvania	August 27, 2007	Wachovia Center	September 1–2, 2007	Hyatt Regency	29
Total number of tickets to Hollywood					164

Contestants were required to be between the ages of 16 and 28 on July 28, 2007, and eligible to work in the United States. Those ineligible included former contestants who had previously reached the semifinals of the first through third seasons, or the last phase of the Hollywood round of the fourth through sixth seasons, those holding recording or management contracts, or those who were not U.S. citizens or permanent residents.

== Hollywood week ==
The Hollywood week took place at the Pasadena Civic Center in Pasadena, California, over a period of five days. A total of 164 contestants were invited from the seven audition cities. This year, the process was altered slightly to ensure that no talent would be prematurely dismissed, and there are no group performances. The contestants performed at least two songs during this round.

The first round of individual performances lasted two days. For the first time ever, contestants had the option of either being accompanied by the band or playing an instrument themselves, such as a keyboard, guitar, or drums. If the judges approved of the contestants' performances, they received a "free pass," exempting them from having to perform in the second round. Unlike previous seasons, contestants whose performances were not considered good enough were afforded a second chance rather than immediate elimination. They lined up on stage in groups of ten and each sang a short segment of a song a cappella. After each group had performed, the judges eliminated about 100 contestants.

In the final round, the remaining contestants individually performed a song chosen from a provided list of songs, accompanied by the band and three backup singers. After each performance, the judges decided the contestant's fate; 50 contestants emerged after this round ended. The judges then deliberated further on who should be in the top 24, and their decision was revealed the next day.

One of the more prominent contestants during the Hollywood week was Josiah Leming, whose unhappiness with the backing band resulted in him dismissing the band. He was eventually eliminated. Another piece of drama involved contestant Kyle Ensley, when Simon Cowell voiced strong objection over him not being selected for the semifinals. His non-selection was later revealed to have resulted in serious rift between Cowell and the show producer Nigel Lythgoe.

== Semifinals ==
The live show portion of the semifinals began on February 19, 2008. Similar to the previous three seasons, the women and men performed on separate shows, and then on the result shows, the bottom two contestants from each group were eliminated from the competition. The semifinals took place over three weeks, resulting in six males and six females being eliminated, leaving the other six to form the top 12. The men performed on the first night, and the ladies the next night.

Color key:

This contestant was safe.
This contestant was eliminated.

=== Top 24 – Music from the 1960s ===
Contestants are listed in the order they performed.

Top 24 - male contestants (February 19)
Contestant	Song	Result
David Hernandez	"In the Midnight Hour"	Safe
Chikezie	"More Today Than Yesterday"	Safe
David Cook	"Happy Together"	Safe
Jason Yeager	"Moon River"	Safe
Robbie Carrico	"One"	Safe
David Archuleta	"Shop Around"	Safe
Dani Noriega (AKA Adore Delano)	"Jailhouse Rock"	Safe
Luke Menard	"Everybody's Talkin'"	Safe
Colton Berry	"Suspicious Minds"	Eliminated
Garrett Haley	"Breaking Up Is Hard to Do"	Eliminated
Jason Castro	"Daydream"	Safe
Michael Johns	"Light My Fire"	Safe

Top 24 - female contestants (February 20)
Contestant	Song	Result
Kristy Lee Cook	"Rescue Me"	Safe
Joanne Borgella	"I Say a Little Prayer"	Eliminated
Alaina Whitaker	"More Today Than Yesterday"	Safe
Amanda Overmyer	"Baby, Please Don't Go"	Safe
Amy Davis	"Where the Boys Are"	Eliminated
Brooke White	"Happy Together"	Safe
Alexandréa Lushington	"Spinning Wheel"	Safe
Kady Malloy	"A Groovy Kind of Love"	Safe
Asia'h Epperson	"Piece of My Heart"	Safe
Ramiele Malubay	"You Don't Have to Say You Love Me"	Safe
Syesha Mercado	"Tobacco Road"	Safe
Carly Smithson	"The Shadow of Your Smile"	Safe

Non-competition performance
Performers	Song
Top 24	1960s medley: "Needles and Pins" "When You Walk in the Room" "Spanish Harlem" "Bend Me, Shape Me"
Paula Abdul and Randy Jackson	"Dance Like There's No Tomorrow"

=== Top 20 – Music from the 1970s ===
Contestants are listed in the order they performed.

Top 20 - male contestants (February 26)
Contestant	Song	Result
Michael Johns	"Go Your Own Way"	Safe
Jason Castro	"I Just Want to Be Your Everything"	Safe
Luke Menard	"Killer Queen"	Safe
Robbie Carrico	"Hot Blooded"	Eliminated
Danny Noriega	"Superstar"	Safe
David Hernandez	"Papa Was a Rollin' Stone"	Safe
Jason Yeager	"Long Train Runnin'"	Eliminated
Chikezie	"I Believe to My Soul"	Safe
David Cook	"All Right Now"	Safe
David Archuleta	"Imagine"	Safe

Top 20 - female contestants (February 27)
Contestant	Song	Result
Carly Smithson	"Crazy on You"	Safe
Syesha Mercado	"Me and Mrs. Jones"	Safe
Brooke White	"You're So Vain"	Safe
Ramiele Malubay	"Don't Leave Me This Way"	Safe
Kristy Lee Cook	"You're No Good"	Safe
Amanda Overmyer	"Carry On Wayward Son"	Safe
Alaina Whitaker	"Hopelessly Devoted to You"	Eliminated
Alexandréa Lushington	"If You Leave Me Now"	Eliminated
Kady Malloy	"Magic Man"	Safe
Asia'h Epperson	"All by Myself"	Safe

Non-competition performance
Performers	Song
Top 20	1970s medley: "I Saw the Light" "It's a Heartache" "The Things We Do for Love" "I Feel the Earth Move"

=== Top 16 – Music from the 1980s ===
Contestants are listed in the order they performed.

Top 16 - male contestants (March 4)
Contestant	Song	Result
Luke Menard	"Wake Me Up Before You Go-Go"	Eliminated
David Archuleta	"Another Day in Paradise"	Safe
Danny Noriega	"Tainted Love"	Eliminated
David Hernandez	"It's All Coming Back to Me Now"	Safe
Michael Johns	"Don't You (Forget About Me)"	Safe
David Cook	"Hello"	Safe
Jason Castro	"Hallelujah"	Safe
Chikezie	"All the Man That I Need"	Safe

Top 16 - female contestants (March 5)
Contestant	Song	Result
Asia'h Epperson	"I Wanna Dance with Somebody (Who Loves Me)"	Eliminated
Kady Malloy	"Who Wants to Live Forever"	Eliminated
Amanda Overmyer	"I Hate Myself for Loving You"	Safe
Carly Smithson	"I Drove All Night"	Safe
Kristy Lee Cook	"Faithfully"	Safe
Ramiele Malubay	"Against All Odds (Take a Look at Me Now)"	Safe
Brooke White	"Love Is a Battlefield"	Safe
Syesha Mercado	"Saving All My Love for You"	Safe

Non-competition performance
Performers	Song
Blake Lewis	"How Many Words"

== Top 12 contestants ==
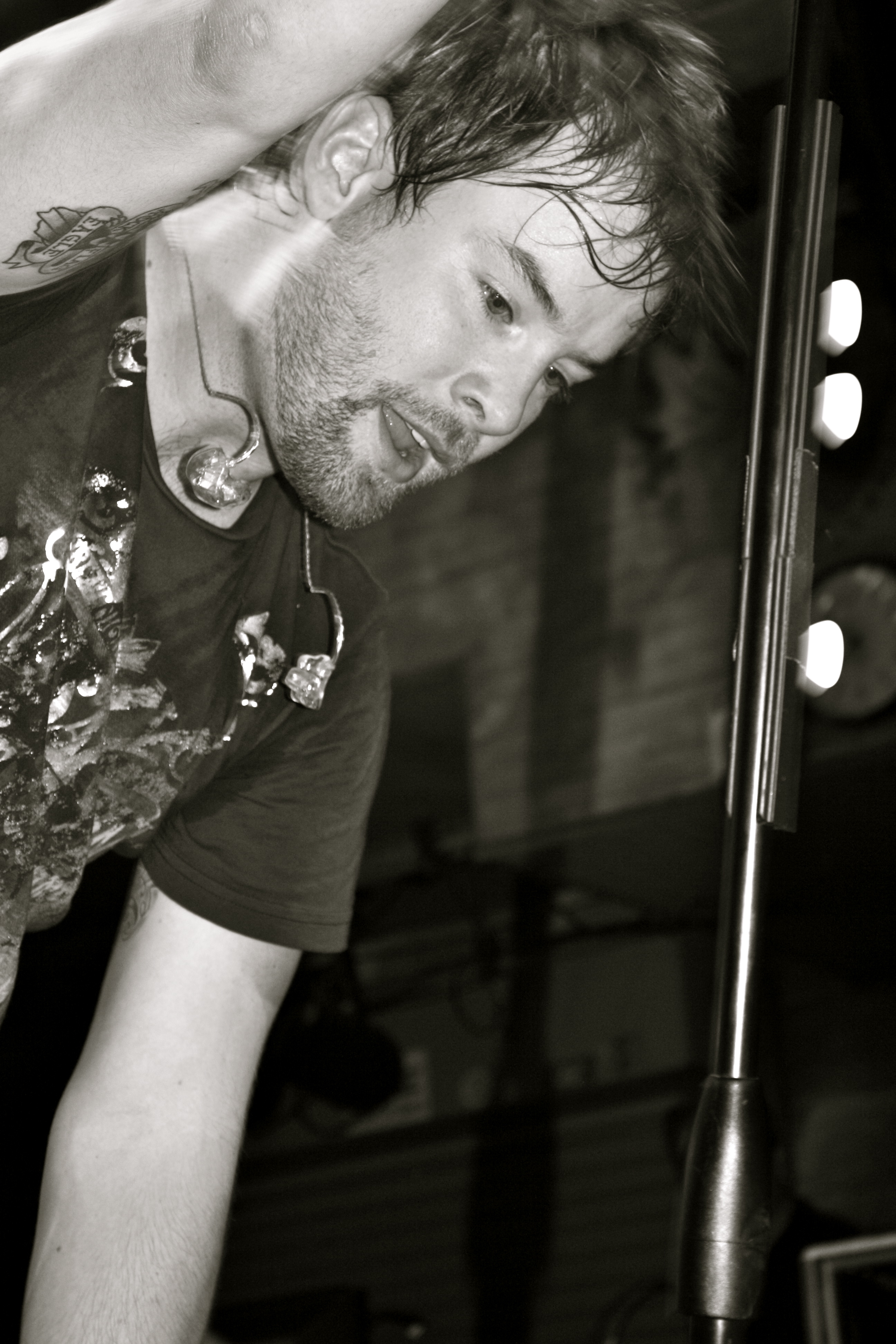
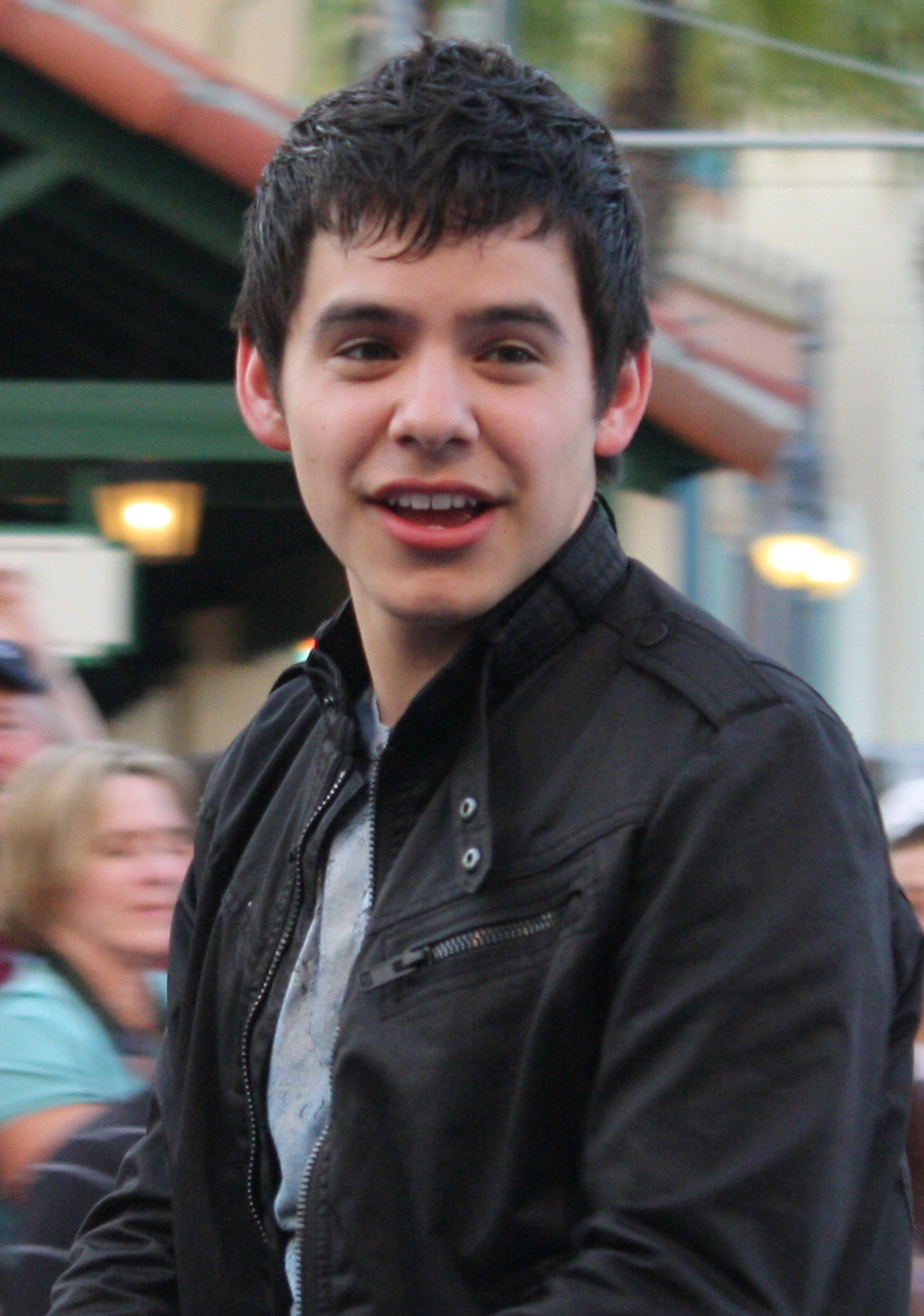
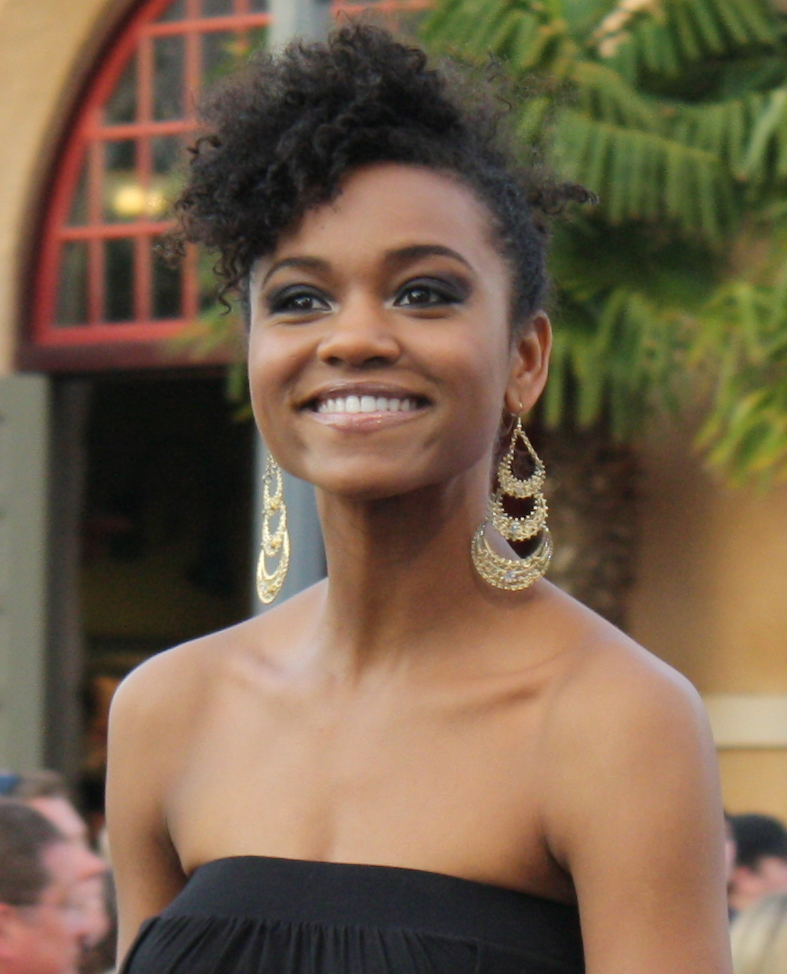
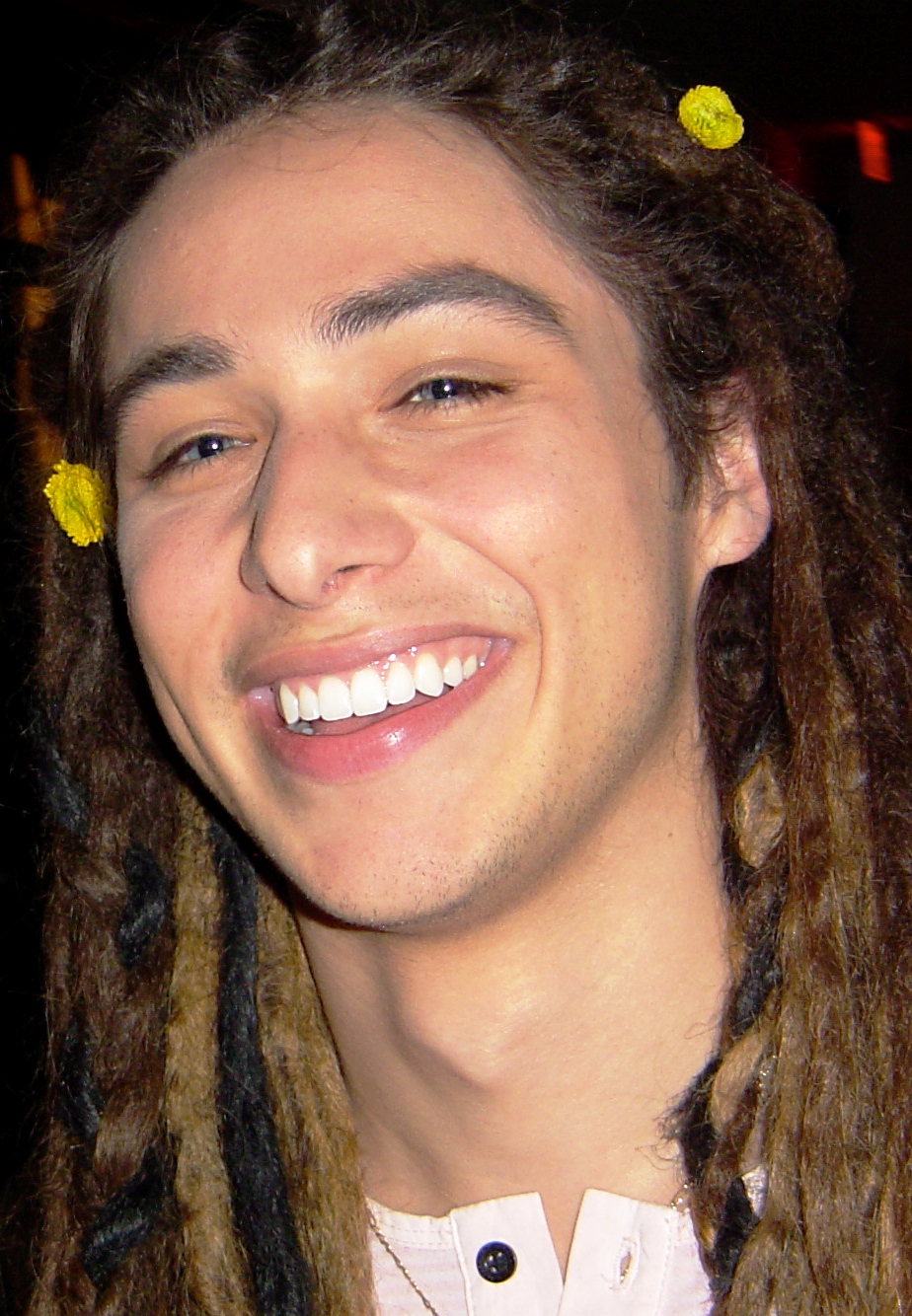
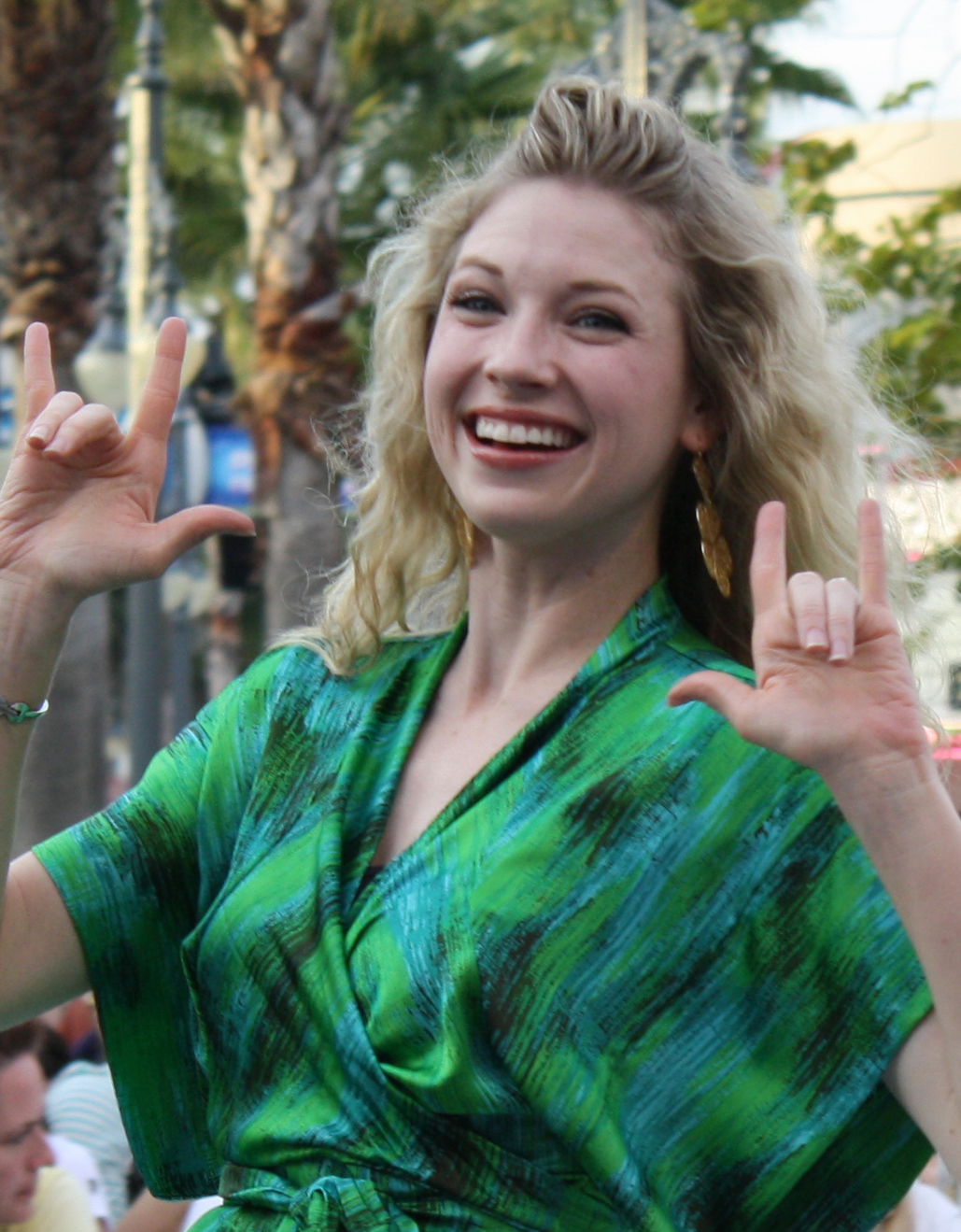
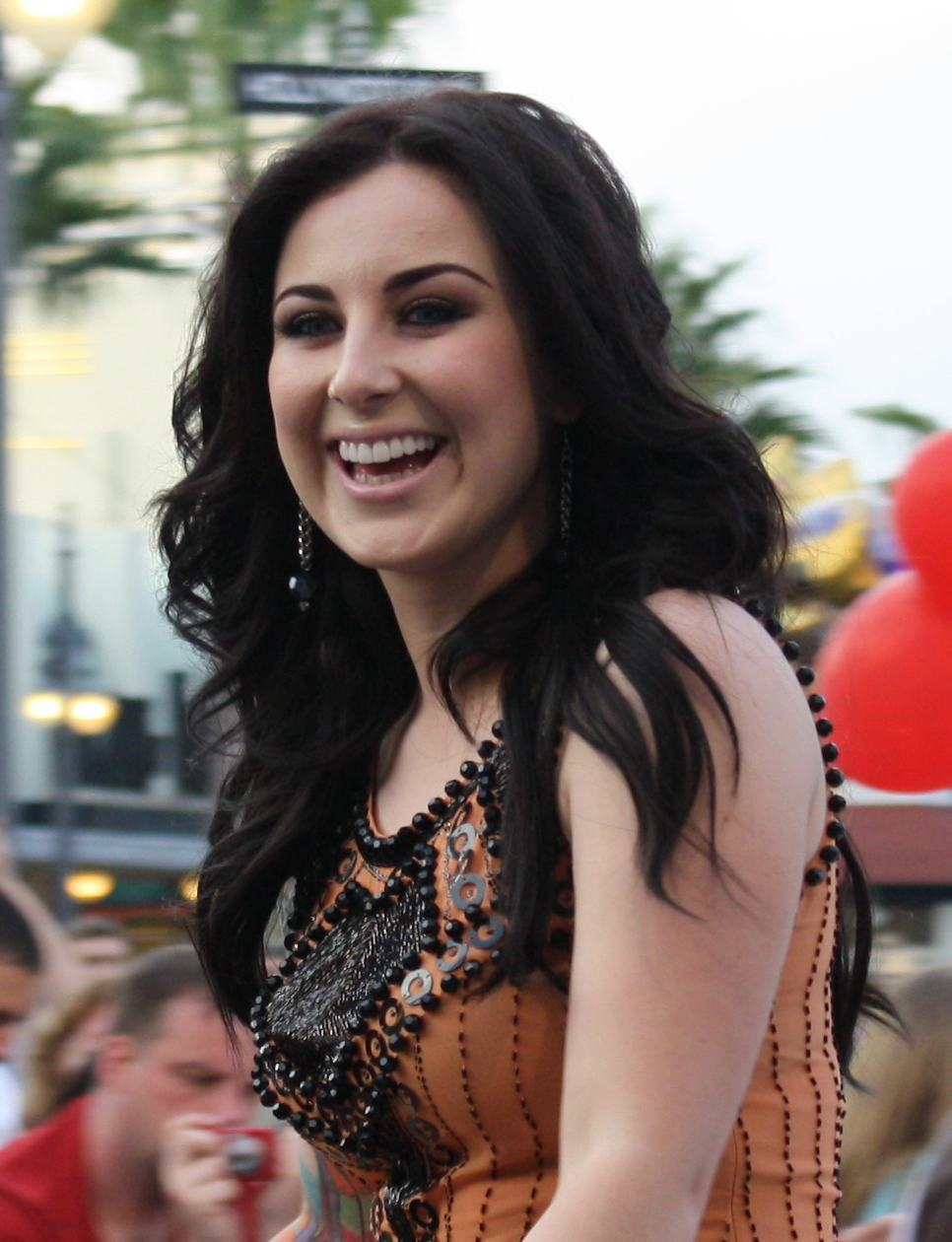
From left to right: David Cook, David Archuleta, Syesha Mercado, Jason Castro, Brooke White, and Carly Smithson
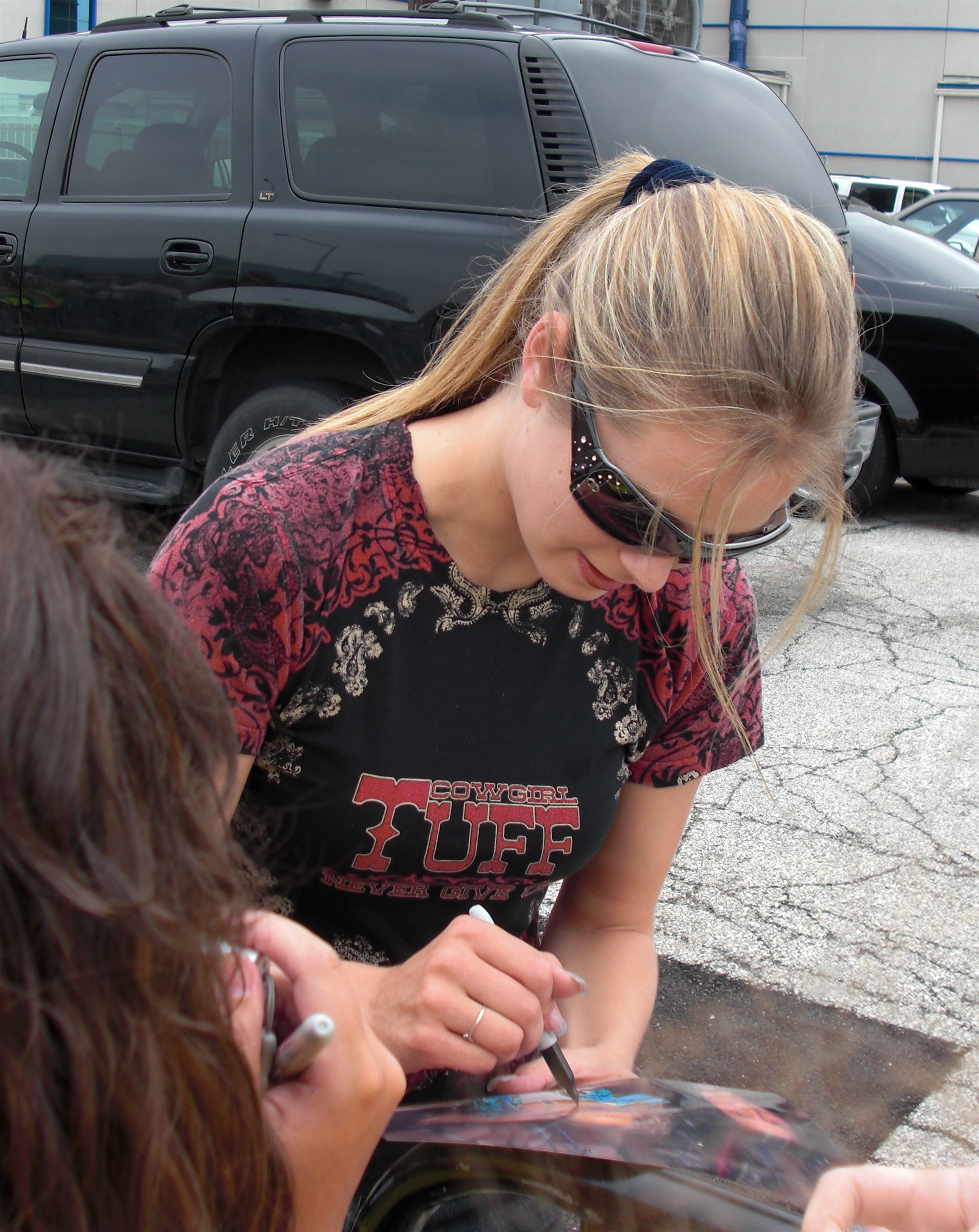
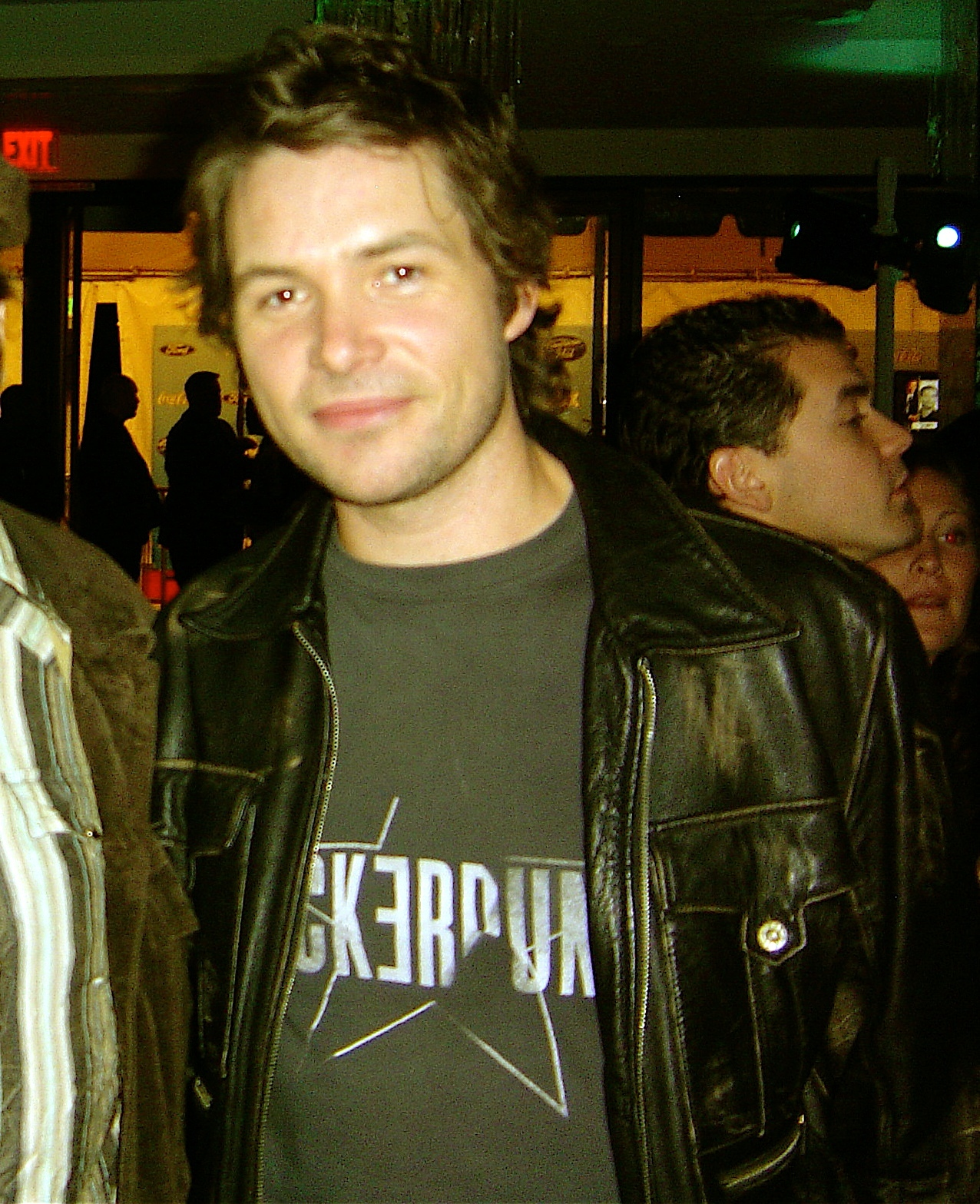
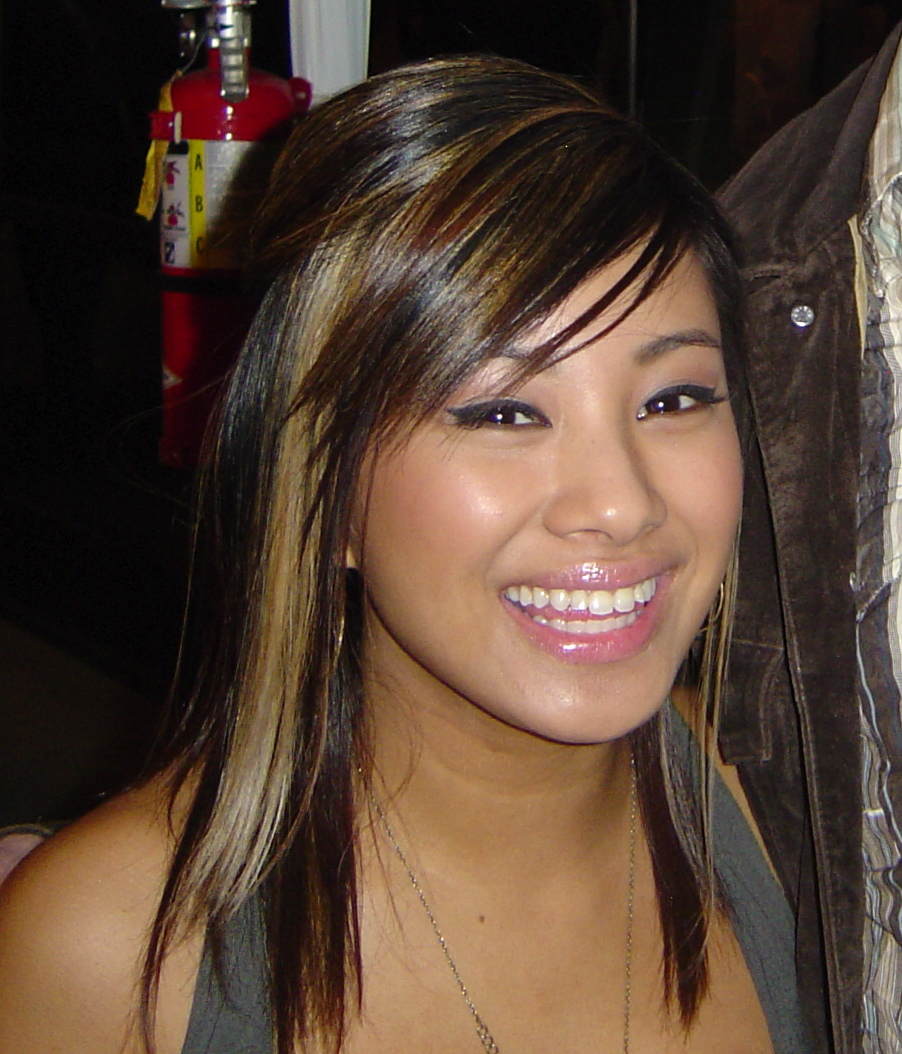
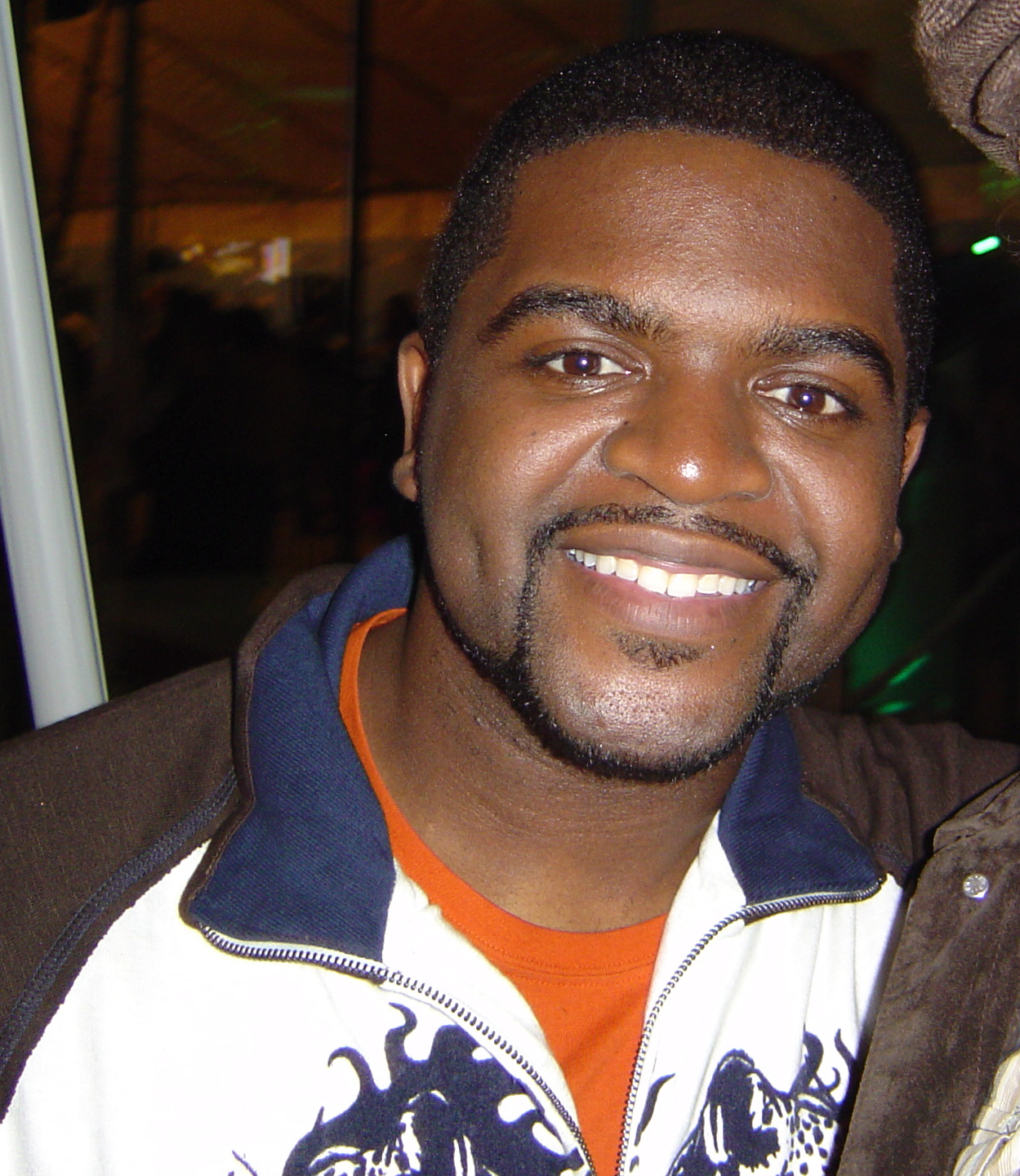
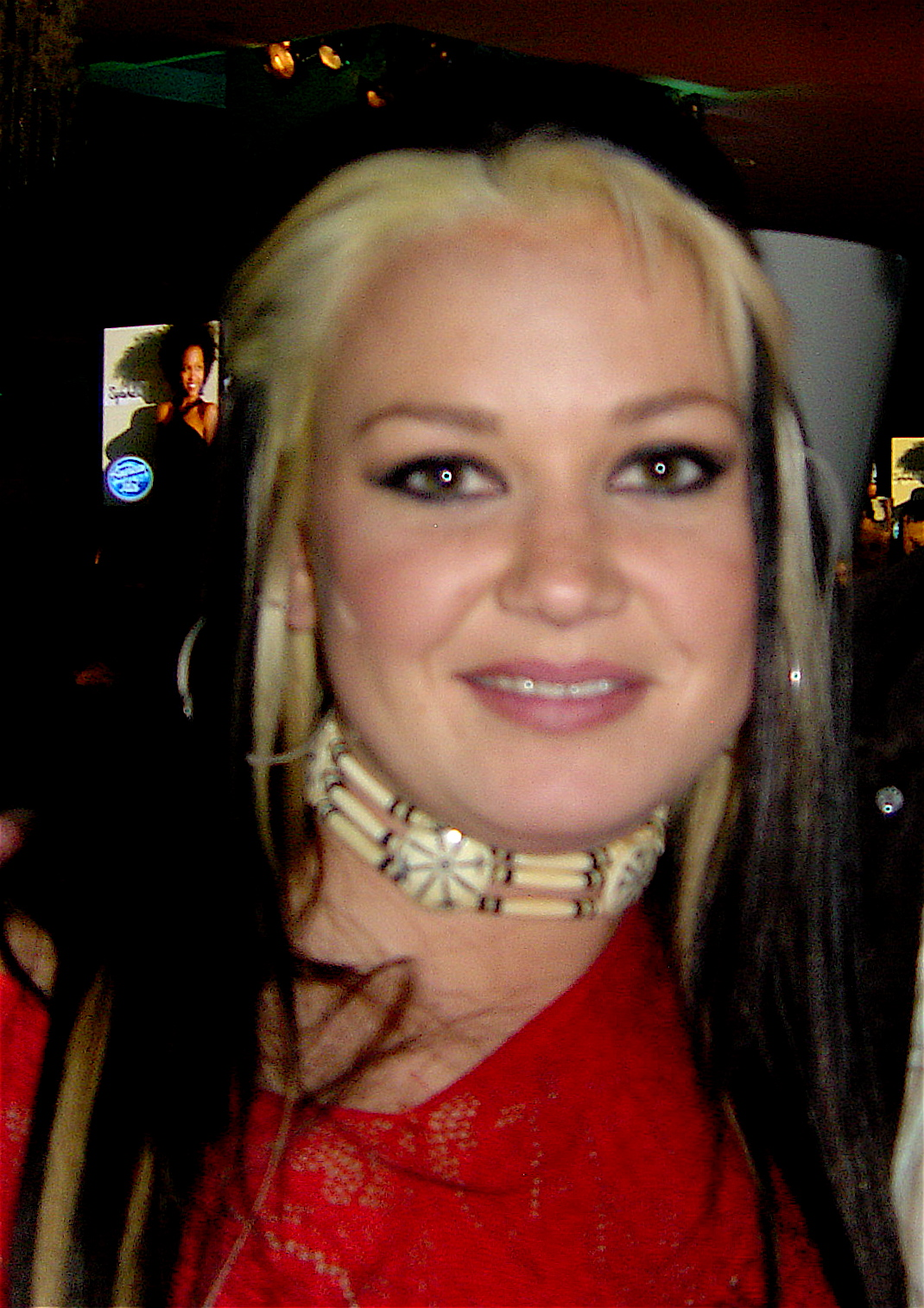
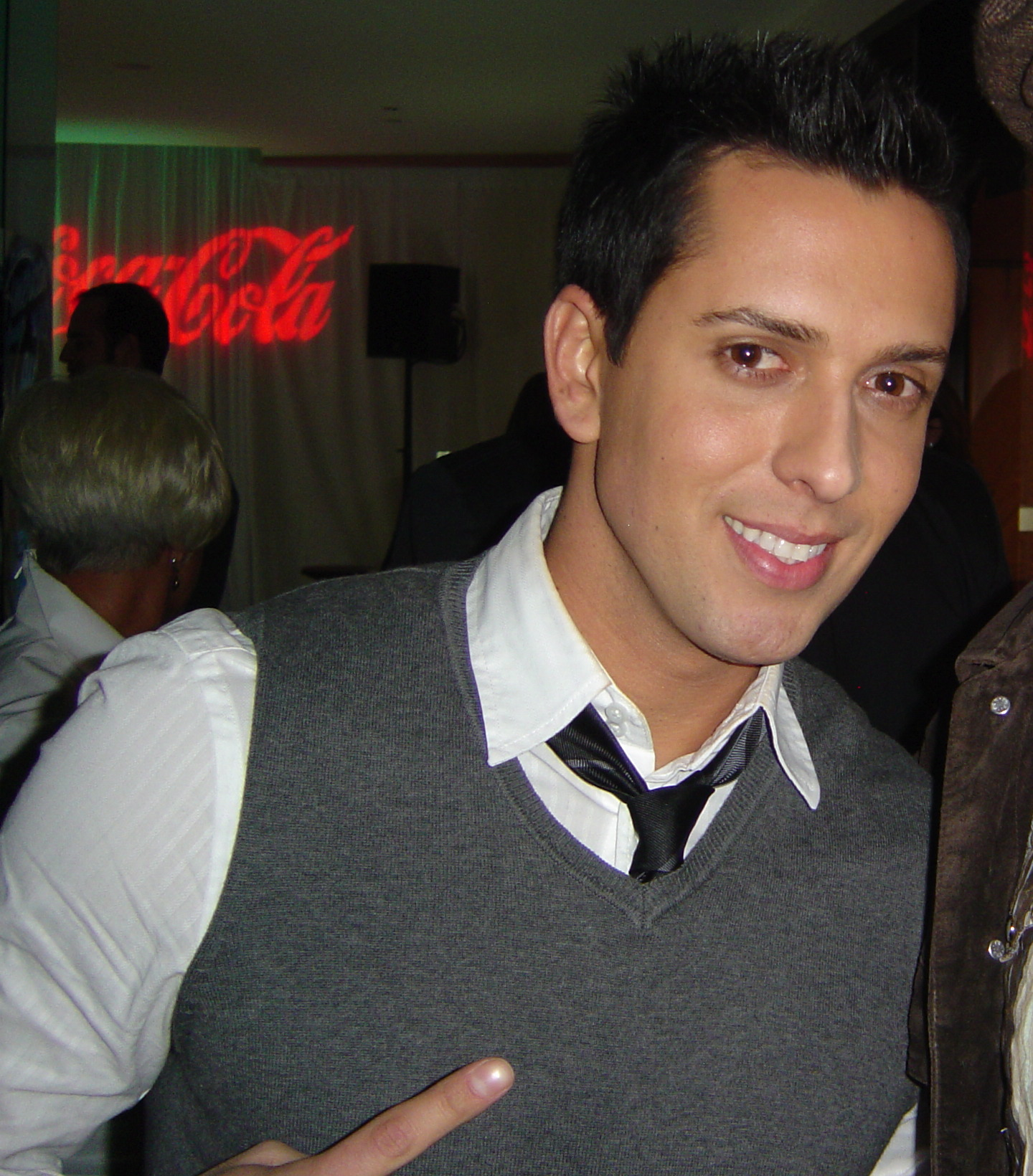
From left to right: Kristy Lee Cook, Michael Johns, Ramiele Malubay, Chikezie, Amanda Overmyer, and David Hernandez
- David Cook (born December 20, 1982, in Houston; 24 years old at the time of the show) was a native of Blue Springs, Missouri, who auditioned in Omaha with Bon Jovi's "Livin' on a Prayer." His Hollywood performance of Bryan Adams's "(Everything I Do) I Do It for You" did not impress Simon Cowell, but his second performance, Edwin McCain's "I'll Be," did.
- David Archuleta (born December 28, 1990, in Miami, Florida; 16 years old at the time of the show) was from Murray, Utah, and auditioned in San Diego with John Mayer's "Waiting on the World to Change." He impressed the judges with his performance of Gnarls Barkley's "Crazy" and Bryan Adams's "Heaven" in Hollywood.
- Syesha Mercado (born January 2, 1987, in Bridgeport, Connecticut; 21 years old at the time of the show) was from Sarasota, Florida, and auditioned in Miami with Aretha Franklin's "Think." In Hollywood, she became ill and almost lost her voice. In preparation for her final Hollywood performance with Aretha Franklin's "Chain of Fools," she went on voice rest and wrote down everything she had to say on a pad of paper.
- Jason Castro (born March 25, 1987; 20 years old at the time of the show) was from Rockwall, Texas, and auditioned in Dallas with Keith Urban's "Once in a Lifetime" and Ray LaMontagne's "Crazy."
- Brooke White (born June 2, 1983, in Mesa, Arizona; 24 years old at the time of the show) was from Van Nuys, California, and auditioned in Philadelphia with Corinne Bailey Rae's "Like a Star." She performed Carole King's "Beautiful" in Hollywood.
- Carly Smithson (born as Carly Hennessy on September 12, 1983, in Dublin, Ireland; 24 years old at the time of the show) was a professional singer from San Diego, California. She had originally auditioned in Las Vegas during the show's fifth season, but was dropped from the show due to a problem with her visa. She auditioned in San Diego with Whitney Houston's "I'm Every Woman," and performed Leo Sayer's "When I Need You" and Heart's "Alone" in Hollywood.
- Kristy Lee Cook (born January 18, 1984; 24 years old at the time of the show) was from Selma, Oregon, and auditioned in Philadelphia, where she sang "Amazing Grace," a song she also performed in Hollywood.
- Michael Johns (born as Michael Lee on October 20, 1978, in Perth, Australia; 29 years old at the time of the show) auditioned in San Diego with Otis Redding's "I've Been Loving You Too Long." In Hollywood, he performed The Doors' "Light My Fire," but it was his performance of Queen's "Bohemian Rhapsody" that was one of the highlights.
- Ramiele Malubay (born September 6, 1987, in Saudi Arabia; 20 years old at the time of the show) was from Miramar, Florida, and auditioned in Miami with Aretha Franklin's "Natural Woman." She performed Aretha Franklin's "Until You Come Back to Me (That's What I'm Gonna Do)" and The Kiki Dee Band's "I've Got the Music in Me" in Hollywood.
- Chikezie (born as Chikezie Eze on September 11, 1985, in Inglewood, California; 22 years old at the time of the show) auditioned in San Diego with Luther Vandross' "All the Woman I Need." He had previously auditioned during the show's sixth season, and made it to Hollywood, but was cut before the top 44.
- Amanda Overmyer (born October 26, 1984; 23 years old at the time of the show) was from Mulberry, Indiana, and auditioned in Atlanta with Janis Joplin's "Turtle Blues" and Creedence Clearwater Revival's "Travelin' Band." She performed The Doors' "Light My Fire" in Hollywood.
- David Hernandez (born May 31, 1983, in Glendale, Arizona; 24 years old at the time of the show) was from Glendale, Arizona, and auditioned with The Temptations' "Ain't Too Proud to Beg." He performed Stephen Stills's "Love the One You're With" in Hollywood.

== Finals ==
There were eleven weeks of finals with twelve contestants competing. One contestant was eliminated every week based on the public's votes.

Color key:

This contestant was saved by America's vote.
This contestant was in the bottom two or three, but was saved by America's vote.
This contestant was eliminated.
This contestant won American Idol.
This contestant was the runner-up.

=== Top 12 – Lennon–McCartney ===
Contestants performed one song each from the Lennon–McCartney discography, and are listed in the order they performed.

Contestant	Lennon–McCartney song	Result
Syesha Mercado	"Got to Get You into My Life"	Bottom three
Chikezie	"She's a Woman"	Safe
Ramiele Malubay	"In My Life"	Safe
Jason Castro	"If I Fell"	Safe
Carly Smithson	"Come Together"	Safe
David Cook	"Eleanor Rigby"	Safe
Brooke White	"Let It Be"	Safe
David Hernandez	"I Saw Her Standing There"	Eliminated
Amanda Overmyer	"You Can't Do That"	Safe
Michael Johns	"Across the Universe"	Safe
Kristy Lee Cook	"Eight Days a Week"	Bottom two
David Archuleta	"We Can Work It Out"	Safe

Non-competition performance
Performers	Song
Top 12	Beatles medley: "All My Loving" "I Feel Fine" "Can't Buy Me Love" "Help!"
Katharine McPhee and David Foster	"Something"

=== Top 11 – The Beatles ===
Contestants performed one song each from the Beatles discography, and are listed in the order they performed.

Contestant	Beatles song	Result
Amanda Overmyer	"Back in the U.S.S.R."	Eliminated
Kristy Lee Cook	"You've Got to Hide Your Love Away"	Bottom two
David Archuleta	"The Long and Winding Road"	Safe
Michael Johns	"A Day in the Life"	Safe
Brooke White	"Here Comes the Sun"	Safe
David Cook	"Day Tripper"	Safe
Carly Smithson	"Blackbird"	Bottom three
Jason Castro	"Michelle"	Safe
Syesha Mercado	"Yesterday"	Safe
Chikezie	"I've Just Seen a Face"	Safe
Ramiele Malubay	"I Should Have Known Better"	Safe

Non-competition performance
Performers	Song
Top 11	Beatles medley: "While My Guitar Gently Weeps" "Here, There and Everywhere" "Because" "The End"
Kellie Pickler	"Red High Heels"

=== Top 10 – Contestants' birth year ===
Contestants each performed one song from the year they were born, and are listed in the order they performed.

Contestant	Song	Birth year	Result
Ramiele Malubay	"Alone"	1987	Safe
Jason Castro	"Fragile"	1987	Bottom three
Syesha Mercado	"If I Were Your Woman"	1987	Bottom two
Chikezie	"If Only for One Night"	1985	Eliminated
Brooke White	"Every Breath You Take"	1983	Safe
Michael Johns	"We Will Rock You" & "We Are the Champions"	1978	Safe
Carly Smithson	"Total Eclipse of the Heart"	1983	Safe
David Archuleta	"You're the Voice"	1990	Safe
Kristy Lee Cook	"God Bless the U.S.A."	1984	Safe
David Cook	"Billie Jean"	1982	Safe

Non-competition performance
Performers	Song
Top 10	"Right Back Where We Started From"
Kimberley Locke	"Fall"

=== Top 9 – Dolly Parton ===
Dolly Parton served as a guest mentor this week. Contestants performed one song each from her discography, and are listed in the order they performed.

Contestant	Dolly Parton song	Result
Brooke White	"Jolene"	Bottom three
David Cook	"Little Sparrow"	Safe
Ramiele Malubay	"Do I Ever Cross Your Mind"	Eliminated
Jason Castro	"Travelin' Thru"	Safe
Carly Smithson	"Here You Come Again"	Safe
David Archuleta	"Smoky Mountain Memories"	Safe
Kristy Lee Cook	"Coat of Many Colors"	Bottom two
Syesha Mercado	"I Will Always Love You"	Safe
Michael Johns	"It's All Wrong, But It's All Right"	Safe

Non-competition performance
Performers	Song
Top 9	"9 to 5"
The Clark Brothers	"This Little Light of Mine"
Dolly Parton	"Jesus and Gravity"

=== Top 8 – Inspirational music ===
Contestants are listed in the order they performed.

Contestant	Song	Result
Michael Johns	"Dream On"	Eliminated
Syesha Mercado	"I Believe"	Bottom three
Jason Castro	"Over the Rainbow"	Safe
Kristy Lee Cook	"Anyway"	Safe
David Cook	"Innocent"	Safe
Carly Smithson	"The Show Must Go On"	Bottom three
David Archuleta	"Angels"	Safe
Brooke White	"You've Got a Friend"	Safe

Non-competition performance
Performers	Song
Top 8	"Shout to the Lord"
Jordin Sparks and Chris Brown	"No Air"

=== Top 7 – Mariah Carey ===
Mariah Carey served as a guest mentor this week. Contestants performed one song each from her discography, and are listed in the order they performed.

Contestant	Mariah Carey song	Result
David Archuleta	"When You Believe"	Safe
Carly Smithson	"Without You"	Safe
Syesha Mercado	"Vanishing"	Bottom three
Brooke White	"Hero"	Bottom two
Kristy Lee Cook	"Forever"	Eliminated
David Cook	"Always Be My Baby"	Safe
Jason Castro	"I Don't Wanna Cry"	Safe

Non-competition performance
Performers	Song
Top 7	"One Sweet Day"
Elliott Yamin	"Free"
Mariah Carey	"Bye Bye"

=== Top 6 – Andrew Lloyd Webber ===
Andrew Lloyd Webber served as a guest mentor this week. Contestants performed one song each from one of his musicals, and are listed in the order they performed.

Contestant	Song	Musical	Result
Syesha Mercado	"One Rock & Roll Too Many"	Starlight Express	Bottom two
Jason Castro	"Memory"	Cats	Safe
Brooke White	"You Must Love Me"	Evita	Safe
David Archuleta	"Think of Me"	The Phantom of the Opera	Safe
Carly Smithson	"Superstar"	Jesus Christ Superstar	Eliminated
David Cook	"The Music of the Night"	The Phantom of the Opera	Safe

Non-competition performance
Performers	Song
Top 6	"All I Ask of You" from The Phantom of the Opera
Leona Lewis	"Bleeding Love"

=== Top 5 – Neil Diamond ===
Neil Diamond was a guest mentor for the week. Contestants performed two songs each from his discography, and are listed in the order they performed.

Contestant	Order	Neil Diamond song	Result
Jason Castro	1	"Forever in Blue Jeans"	Safe
Jason Castro	6	"September Morn"	Safe
David Cook	2	"I'm Alive"	Safe
David Cook	7	"All I Really Need Is You"	Safe
Brooke White	3	"I'm a Believer"	Eliminated
Brooke White	8	"I Am...I Said"	Eliminated
David Archuleta	4	"Sweet Caroline"	Safe
David Archuleta	9	"America"	Safe
Syesha Mercado	5	"Hello Again"	Safe
Syesha Mercado	10	"Thank the Lord for the Night Time"	Safe

Non-competition performance
Performers	Song
Top 5	Neil Diamond medley: "Cracklin' Rosie" "Song Sung Blue" "Brother Love's Travelling Salvation Show"
Natasha Bedingfield	"Pocketful of Sunshine"
Neil Diamond	"Pretty Amazing Grace"

=== Top 4 – Rock and Roll Hall of Fame ===
Contestants performed two songs, and are listed in the order they performed.

Contestant	Order	Rock and roll song	Result
David Cook	1	"Hungry Like the Wolf"	Safe
David Cook	5	"Baba O'Riley"	Safe
Syesha Mercado	2	"Proud Mary"	Safe
Syesha Mercado	6	"A Change Is Gonna Come"	Safe
Jason Castro	3	"I Shot the Sheriff"	Eliminated
Jason Castro	7	"Mr. Tambourine Man"	Eliminated
David Archuleta	4	"Stand by Me"	Safe
David Archuleta	8	"Love Me Tender"	Safe

Non-competition performance
Performers	Song
Top 4	"Reelin' In the Years"
Maroon 5	"If I Never See Your Face Again"
Bo Bice	"Witness"

=== Top 3 ===
Each contestant performed three songs: one chosen by one of the judges, one chosen by the producers, and one chosen by the contestant. Contestants are listed in the order they performed.

Contestant	Order	Song	Result
David Archuleta	1	"And So It Goes" (Note: Song chosen by Paula Abdul.)	Safe
David Archuleta	4	"With You"	Safe
David Archuleta	7	"Longer"	Safe
Syesha Mercado	2	"If I Ain't Got You" (Note: Song chosen by Randy Jackson.)	Eliminated
Syesha Mercado	5	"Fever"	Eliminated
Syesha Mercado	8	"Hit Me Up"	Eliminated
David Cook	3	"The First Time Ever I Saw Your Face" (Note: Song chosen by Simon Cowell.)	Safe
David Cook	6	"Dare You to Move"	Safe
David Cook	9	"I Don't Want to Miss a Thing"	Safe

Non-competition performance
Performers	Song
Top 3	"Ain't No Stoppin' Us Now"
Fantasia	"Bore Me (Yawn)"

=== Top 2 – Finale ===
Each contestant performed three songs, and are listed in the order they performed. David Archuletha won the coin toss after the results show the prior week, and chose to perform last.

Contestant	Order	Song	Result
David Cook	1	"I Still Haven't Found What I'm Looking For" (Note: Song chosen by Clive Davis.)	Winner
David Cook	3	"Dream Big"	Winner
David Cook	5	"The World I Know"	Winner
David Archuleta	2	"Don't Let the Sun Go Down on Me"	Runner-up
David Archuleta	4	"In This Moment"	Runner-up
David Archuleta	6	"Imagine"	Runner-up

Non-competition performance
Performers	Song
Ruben Studdard	"Celebrate Me Home"
Top 12	"Get Ready"
David Cook and David Archuleta	"Hero"
Syesha Mercado with Seal	"Waiting for You"
Jason Castro	"Hallelujah"
Top 12 women with Donna Summer	"She Works Hard for the Money" "Hot Stuff" "Stamp Your Feet" "Last Dance"
Carly Smithson and Michael Johns	"The Letter"
Top 12 men with Bryan Adams	"Summer of '69" "Heaven" "I Thought I'd Seen Everything" "Somebody"
David Cook with ZZ Top	"Sharp Dressed Man"
Brooke White with Graham Nash	"Teach Your Children"
Jonas Brothers	"S.O.S"
Renaldo Lapuz	"We're Brothers Forever"
David Archuleta with OneRepublic	"Apologize"
Jordin Sparks	"One Step at a Time"
Gladys Knight	"Midnight Train to Georgia"
Carrie Underwood	"Last Name"
Top 12 with George Michael	"Faith" "Father Figure" "Freedom" "Praying for Time"
David Cook	"The Time of My Life"

== Elimination chart ==
Color key:

Winner
Runner-up
Saved by the public
Bottom two or three
Eliminated

American Idol (season 7) - Eliminations
Contestant	Pl.	Semifinals			Top 12	Top 11	Top 10	Top 9	Top 8	Top 7	Top 6	Top 5	Top 4	Top 3	Finale
Contestant	Pl.	2/21	2/28	3/6	3/13	3/20	3/27	4/2	4/10 (Note: The top 8 results show was moved to Thursday, April 10, due to the Idol Gives Back special airing in the show's regular Wednesday timeslot.)	4/16	4/23	4/30	5/7	5/14	5/21
David Cook	1	Safe	Safe	Safe	Safe	Safe	Safe	Safe	Safe	Safe	Safe	Safe	Safe	Safe	Winner
David Archuleta	2	Safe	Safe	Safe	Safe	Safe	Safe	Safe	Safe	Safe	Safe	Safe	Safe	Safe	Runner-up
Syesha Mercado	3	Safe	Safe	Safe	Bottom three	Safe	Bottom two	Safe	Bottom three	Bottom three	Bottom two	Safe	Safe	Eliminated	
Jason Castro	4	Safe	Safe	Safe	Safe	Safe	Bottom three	Safe	Safe	Safe	Safe	Safe	Eliminated		
Brooke White	5	Safe	Safe	Safe	Safe	Safe	Safe	Bottom three	Safe	Bottom two	Safe	Eliminated			
Carly Smithson	6	Safe	Safe	Safe	Safe	Bottom three	Safe	Safe	Bottom three	Safe	Eliminated				
Kristy Lee Cook	7	Safe	Safe	Safe	Bottom two	Bottom two	Safe	Bottom two	Safe	Eliminated					
Michael Johns	8	Safe	Safe	Safe	Safe	Safe	Safe	Safe	Eliminated						
Ramiele Malubay	9	Safe	Safe	Safe	Safe	Safe	Safe	Eliminated							
Chikezie	10	Safe	Safe	Safe	Safe	Safe	Eliminated								
Amanda Overmyer	11	Safe	Safe	Safe	Safe	Eliminated									
David Hernandez	12	Safe	Safe	Safe	Eliminated										
Asia'h Epperson		Safe	Safe	Eliminated											
Kady Malloy		Safe	Safe	Eliminated											
Luke Menard		Safe	Safe	Eliminated											
Danny Noriega		Safe	Safe	Eliminated											
Robbie Carrico		Safe	Eliminated												
Alexandréa Lushington		Safe	Eliminated												
Alaina Whitaker		Safe	Eliminated												
Jason Yeager		Safe	Eliminated												
Colton Berry		Eliminated													
Joanne Borgella		Eliminated													
Amy Davis		Eliminated													
Garrett Haley		Eliminated													

== Idol Gives Back ==
The Idol Gives Back initiative returned on April 9, 2008. Again proceeds went to children's charities in Africa and the United States. Unlike Idol Gives Back 2007, where no contestant was eliminated, Michael Johns was eliminated during Idol Gives Back 2008.

== Controversies ==
Carly Smithson stirred up controversy due to a prior major label record deal she had with MCA Records. To further complicate things, Randy Jackson worked for MCA during the same period of time which Smithson was signed. The media noted that several of the other season 7 semifinalists had previously also had record deals, including Kristy Lee Cook, Brooke White, and Michael Johns. According to a poll conducted by AOL Television, 63 percent of those polled believed that contestants who already had record deals should not be contestants on American Idol, however, Idol rules said that contestants were eligible so long as they were no longer under contract when Idol began, regardless of any past contracts.

On the April 29 show, the five remaining contestants each sang two songs. Diverting from the usual format due to time constraints, the judges' critiques were to be bundled until after both songs were performed. However, after the first round had finished, host Ryan Seacrest asked for comments, and judge Paula Abdul in discussing Jason Castro, delivered feedback on his second song before he had actually performed it. That led to speculation that the show was scripted or rigged. The next day, Abdul claimed on Seacrest's radio show that she listened to the performances in rehearsal and in the rushed atmosphere of the show was confused and thought she was supposed to critique both.

== Releases ==
=== iTunes ===
During season 7, American Idol partnered with iTunes to make available for sale exclusive performance videos, live performance singles of the semifinalists, and full-length studio recordings of the songs that contestants performed on the show. In order to keep the competition fair, these singles were not allowed to appear on iTunes sales charts until after the finale. The contestants' performances during the season were removed soon after the finale.

The winning song, "The Time of My Life", was recorded by David Cook and released on May 22, 2008. The song was certified platinum by the RIAA on December 12, 2008. It was the first winner's song to not be performed during the competition as the top 2 each selected a different song from a list of ten entries in song-writing competition to perform instead. Cook performed "The Time of My Life" after Ryan Seacrest had announced him as the winner.

=== Post-Idol ===
David Cook's debut album was released on November 18, 2008, on 19 Recordings / RCA Records and was certified platinum by the RIAA on January 22, 2009. Cook teamed with Grammy winning producer Rob Cavallo (Green Day, Kid Rock) on the album. A single from the album, "Light On," was released and peaked at 20 on the Billboard Hot 100. His sophomore album, This Loud Morning, was released on June 28, 2011.

David Archuleta signed with Jive Records and his self-titled debut album was released on November 11, 2008, and debuted at number two. Archuleta's album certified gold. Archuleta's first single, "Crush," debuted at number two on the Billboard Hot 100 and number one on the Hot Digital Songs chart, giving it the highest single debut of 2008 and the highest single debut in 18 months. The song has sold 1.9 million copies as of January 2009.

== U.S. Nielsen ratings ==
Season 7 of American Idol overall was the most watched primetime program in the United States for the fourth consecutive year, during the conclusion of the 2007–2008 television season. The Tuesday episode viewership averaged 27.665 million while the Wednesday episode averaged 26.843 million, taking the top 2 spots for the season. The show helped Fox become the most watched overall television network in the U.S. for the first time in its history (as well as a record first for a non-Big Three major network in American television history), and lead the 18–49 demographic ratings with still-standing largest ever margin since the introduction of the people meter technology in the Nielsen nationwide television tallies during the 1985–1986 television season.

Episode list

Show	Episode	Air date	Week rank	Rating/Share	18–49 rating/Share	Viewers (millions)
1	"Philadelphia Auditions"	January 15, 2008	3	17.7 / 26	13.8 / 32	33.415
2	"Dallas Auditions"	January 16, 2008	4	16.7 / 25	12.6 / 30	30.437
3	"San Diego Auditions"	January 22, 2008	1	16.2 / 24	11.8 / 29	29.274
4	"Charleston Auditions"	January 23, 2008	2	15.1 / 23	10.9 / 28	27.091
5	"Omaha Auditions"	January 29, 2008	4	15.7 / 24	11.1 / 28	28.223
6	"Miami Auditions"	January 30, 2008	5	14.4 / 22	10.1 / 26	25.573
7	"Atlanta Auditions"	February 5, 2008	1	15.7 / 23	11.2 / 28	27.914
8	"Best of the Rest"	February 6, 2008	2	14.6 / 23	10.5 / 26	26.278
9	"Hollywood Round, Part 1"	February 12, 2008	1	16.6 / 25	12.3 / 29	29.962
10	"Hollywood Round, Part 2"	February 13, 2008	2	14.3 / 22	9.8 / 26	24.752
11	"Top 12 Men Perform"	February 19, 2008	2	16.4 / 25	11.3 / 27	29.006
12	"Top 12 Women Perform"	February 20, 2008	3	16.1 / 24	11.2 / 27	28.885
13	"Top 24 Results"	February 21, 2008	4	13.4 / 21	8.5 / 22	23.374
14	"Top 10 Men Perform"	February 26, 2008	1	16.0 / 24	11.1 / 27	28.592
15	"Top 10 Women Perform"	February 27, 2008	2	15.7 / 24	10.5 / 27	27.553
16	"Top 20 Results"	February 28, 2008	3	14.9 / 23	9.1 / 24	26.232
17	"Top 8 Men Perform"	March 4, 2008	1	15.9 / 24	10.6 / 26	28.463
18	"Top 8 Women Perform"	March 5, 2008	2	16.0 / 25	10.4 / 27	28.324
19	"Top 12 Revealed"	March 6, 2008	3	15.0 / 23	9.4 / 24	26.502
20	"Top 12 Perform"	March 11, 2008	1	16.9 / 26	11.0 / 28	29.884
21	"Top 12 Results"	March 12, 2008	2	15.8 / 24	10.3 / 26	27.127
22	"Top 11 Perform"	March 18, 2008	1	15.2 / 23	10.4 / 26	27.338
23	"Top 11 Results"	March 19, 2008	2	15.3 / 24	9.8 / 25	26.078
24	"Top 10 Perform"	March 25, 2008	2	14.0 / 21	9.7 / 25	24.758
25	"Top 10 Results"	March 26, 2008	1	15.2 / 24	9.8 / 25	25.742
26	"Top 9 Perform"	April 1, 2008	1	14.7 / 23	9.6 / 26	26.117
27	"Top 9 Results"	April 2, 2008	2	14.8 / 22	9.4 / 23	24.839
28	"Top 8 Perform"	April 8, 2008	1	14.2 / 22	9.2 / 24	24.668
29	"Idol Gives Back"	April 9, 2008	6	10.4 / 16	6.8 / 18	17.751
30	"Top 8 Results"	April 10, 2008	2	12.0 / 19	7.0 / 19	20.133
31	"Top 7 Perform"	April 15, 2008	1	13.9 / 22	8.8 / 23	23.646
32	"Top 7 Results"	April 16, 2008	2	13.4 / 21	8.8 / 22	23.339
33	Top 6 Perform"	April 22, 2008	1	14.2 / 22	9.0 / 25	24.740
34	"Top 6 Results"	April 23, 2008	2	13.7 / 21	8.6 / 21	23.196
35	"Top 5 Perform"	April 29, 2008	1	14.5 / 23	9.0 / 24	25.094
36	"Top 5 Results"	April 30, 2008	2	13.6 / 21	8.4 / 21	22.800
37	"Top 4 Perform"	May 6, 2008	2	12.6 / 20	8.4 / 23	21.755
38	"Top 4 Results"	May 7, 2008	1	13.9 / 21	8.2 / 21	22.867
39	"Top 3 Perform"	May 13, 2008	2	14.4 / 23	9.0 / 25	24.772
40	"Top 3 Results"	May 14, 2008	1	14.6 / 22	9.2 / 22	24.863
41	"Top 2 Perform"	May 20, 2008	2	15.1 / 24	10.1 / 28	27.061
42	Season 7 Finale"	May 21, 2008	1	17.7 / 28	11.4 / 30	31.661

== See also ==
- American Idols LIVE! Tour 2008
