= Renaldo Lapuz =

Filipino musician

- Born: December 18, 1962 (age 62); Manila, Philippines
- Origin: Dallas, Texas, United States
- Genres: Pop
- Occupation(s): Musician, singer-songwriter
- Years active: 2007—present

Renaldo (Reynaldo) Lapuz (born December 18, 1962) is a Filipino-American who auditioned on the seventh season of the television series American Idol, singing the self-written song "We're Brothers Forever".

== Biography ==
Lapuz is a native of the Philippines. His mother is of German descent and lives in Wisconsin. Lapuz immigrated to the United States in 2004, and worked as a janitor at Greyhound and Wal-mart. Lapuz regularly sang as a member of the Filipino Choir at Immaculate Conception Church in Reno, Nevada.

In 2007 Renaldo Lapuz auditioned for American Idol in Dallas, Texas. For his audition, he sang his own original song, "We're Brothers Forever", while wearing a handsome wide-brimmed, winged, marabou feather-covered white hat with the word "SIMON" printed on it and a metallic silver cape. During his audition, which aired in January, judge Simon Cowell complimented him but gently rejected him by saying of his performance "I'm going to make a prediction here. I have a horrible feeling that it's going to be a hit record. You're very entertaining. I actually like you... but it's going to be a no." (Due to his age he was also ineligible.) Lapuz returned to the show to sing his song during the finale of American Idol Season 7 in May 2008, this time supported instrumentally by the University of Southern California marching band.

== Internet popularity ==
Lapuz's American Idol Season 7 audition piece was a favorite on video sites, with more than 68.2 million hits in the video sharing website YouTube, the first of which being so popular that it generated a cease and desist letter from News Corp. Subsequent releases have received more than 59,640,100 hits. His audition piece has become so popular that about five of his now famous video clips have landed in the top 10 most favorite for the week, totaling to about 39,056,000 favorites as of posting time. Since it was uploaded on January 16, Lapuz's seven-minute video has attracted more than 59,590,998 views (as of 11 pm, Tuesday, May 20, 2008), which is also among the top views in YouTube for the week.

In February 2008, the Philippine Daily Inquirer reported that a major label with local operations was trying to locate Lapuz for "a possible recording deal".

On November 24, 2010, Lapuz released a new album on iTunes, Amazon, and Napster. His new album consisted of two self-written songs, "Christmas Chocolatee" (pronounced tsokolate) and "Daddy", in both English and Tagalog. Speaking with the Philippine Daily Inquirer, Renaldo recalled the inspiration to "Christmas Chocolatee:" "When I was a little boy, my late sister Fe Lapuz-Velasco gave me a toy, a plastic kid on a horse. It was my first Christmas gift and I remember drinking hot and sweet tsokolate and eating 'tasty' bread with no filling, for Noche Buena."

== Discography ==
- Renaldo Lapuz (2009)
- Rey (2010)
