= Robby Navarro =

- Born: Roberto G. Navarro, Jr. 17 September 1979 (age 46)
- Origin: Pampanga, Philippines
- Genres: Soul, RnB and pop
- Occupation: Singer
- Years active: 1999–present
- Label: Sony BMG Philippines (1999)

Roberto "Robby" Navarro, Jr., popularly known as Robby Navarro is best known as one of the finalists of Pinoy Idol where he reached the 10th spot.

== Biography ==
=== Early life and career beginnings ===
He was once part of a singing group called the Wiseguys, but made a difficult decision to go solo, which he claims is paying off. He released an eponymous solo album in 1999 under Sony BMG Philippines.

He and his acoustic group Soul'Dfree performed on regular gigs in Bagaberde in Pasig and Roxas Blvd., Masas Greenbelt 3 in Makati, Moomba in Roces Ave.

=== 2008: Pinoy Idol ===
Navarro auditioned in Angeles City. He was chosen to be in the Top 24 and eventually making it to Top 12.

After Raymond Gutierrez said that it was Navarro's turn to go home, everyone was disappointed. Even the judges were not expecting that Robby had been eliminated that early.

When the bottom group was revealed (Daryl Celis, Sue Ellen and Robby Navarro), Ogie Alcasid was not expecting that Navarro would be in the bottom three, knowing that Navarro is one of the better singers in that competition. Adding to that, Jolina Magdangal said that it's not worth it to be included in a bottom group after a one npt-so-good performance. While Wyngard Tracy warned the Filipino viewers to vote objectively and do not blame them if the winner of Pinoy Idol would not be deserving.

==== Pinoy Idol performances ====
Week	Theme	Song Choice	Original artist	Result
Semi-finals 1	Contestant's Choice	"Whenever, Wherever, Whatever"	Maxwell	Safe
Semi-finals 2	Hit Songs From Year of Birth	"What You Won't Do for Love"	Bobby Caldwell	Bottom 4 Men
Semi-finals 3	Greatest Musical Influences	"Wildflower"	Color Me Badd	Safe
Semi-finals 4	Songs For Fathers	"If Tomorrow Never Comes"	Garth Brooks	Safe
Top 12	Songs From Their Greatest Pre-Idol Performances	"One Last Cry"	Brian McKnight	Safe
Top 11	Song Dedications	"Someone That I Used To Love"	Natalie Cole	Safe
Top 10	Songs of Their Lives	"Greatest Love of All"	Whitney Houston	Eliminated

=== 2008–present: Post Pinoy Idol ===
Navarro appeared in some of GMA Network's shows including SOP, Sis and The Sweet Life with Lucy Torres – Gomez and Wilma Doesnt.

He performed in SOP as one of the performers of the segment "You've Got Male" temporarily replacing Pinoy Pop Superstar Season 3 runner up Bryan Termulo for several weeks. Navarro also had the chance to sing with RnB Prince Jay-R, Queen of Soul Jaya and his co – Pinoy Idol contestant Sue Ellen in singing "If I Ain't Got You" by Alicia Keys.

He sang and performed with Ogie Alcasid in Sis in singing "Nais Ko" during Ogie's promotion of his album. Navarro had again the chance to sing with Jay-R in singing "What You Won't Do For Love" originally performed by Bobby Caldwell to promote Jay-R's newest album Soul In Love.

Robbie Navarro and Soul'd Free (Jeboy Bermundo on Lead Guitar, Angelo Manrique on Bass and Arbee Pineda on Percussions) have been performing together again since October 2008. They performed regularly at Bagaberde in Roxas Boulevard, Barbariba in CCP Complex in Manila, Masas in Greenbelt 3 and at Moomba Bar and Restaurant in Roces Avenue, Quezon City.

Ogie was very vocal in saying that Navarro is great. That he [Navarro] is Ogie's bet right after the Top 12 was chosen.

== Tour ==
=== Ogie Sings with the Idols ===
When the "Ogie Sings with the Idols" with American Idol finalist Ramiele Malubay, was in full swing, there were unconfirmed reports that Navarro will be having an album that will be produced by Ogie Alcasid and Regine Velasquez under their iMusic Label. Ogie Alcasid said that "We're thinking about that. Robby deserves to have an album since he is one of the best singers in Pinoy Idol."

== Personal life ==
According to his answers to the questions in the official website of Pinoy Idol, Navarro loves to sketch, draw and to play video games for fun.

He considers his mom to be his source of musical talent. He also said that Stevie Wonder inspires him to be more determined in his singing because Stevie still inspires people through music and life despite his handicap and physical challenge.

People who stand up for what they believe in are the persons who really inspire him the most.
