= Ramiele Malubay =

Filipino-American Singer

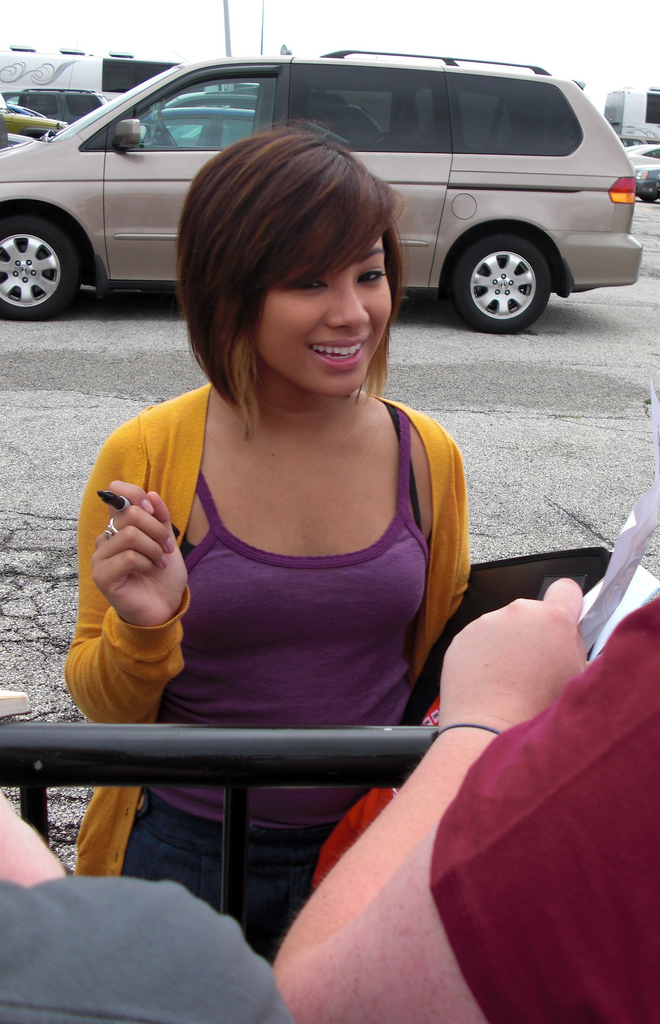
- Malubay signing autographs during the American Idols LIVE! Tour 2008.

Background information
- Also known as: Ramiele
- Born: Ramiele Macrohon Malubay; September 6, 1987 (age 38); Dammam, Saudi Arabia
- Origin: Manila, Philippines; Miramar, Florida, United States
- Genres: Pop, soul
- Occupations: Singer, waitress
- Instruments: Vocals, piano
- Years active: 2007–present
- Label: Unsigned

Ramiele Macrohon Malubay (born September 6, 1987), also known as Ramiele, is a Filipino-American singer and the ninth place finalist on the seventh season of the television series American Idol.

== Biography ==
Ramiele Macrohon Malubay was born in Dammam, Saudi Arabia to Filipino expatriate immigrant parents Roger Malubay and Alicia Macrohon. When the Gulf War broke out, Malubay's parents sent her to the Philippines; the family then moved to the United States and currently reside in Miramar, Florida. She graduated from Charles W. Flanagan High School and then went on to study nursing at Broward College.

Malubay started Polynesian Dancing when she was in the first grade and started singing at the age of twelve. At an early age, Malubay started singing for various Filipino-American functions around Florida, as well as opening for Filipino acts such as Kuh Ledesma and Martin Nievera during American tours.

She was the subject of a minor controversy when a number of personal pictures came to light featuring Malubay and several female friends touching each other's breasts.

== American Idol ==
=== Overview ===
Malubay successfully auditioned for American Idol in August 2007 when she sang Aretha Franklin's "(You Make Me Feel Like) A Natural Woman". She received rave reviews after her performance of "You Don't Have to Say You Love Me" in the first week of the voting rounds. Judge Randy Jackson called her performance "classy, almost like a pro," while Simon Cowell proclaimed that she "outsang every single person" that night. Cowell also named her "one of the top three singers in the competition" after her performance of "Don't Leave Me This Way" and also noted that she was "probably the most consistently good singer" during the Hollywood rounds. She finished in ninth place and is believed to be the shortest contestant in Idol history, standing only 4 feet 11 inches tall. Malubay was eliminated from American Idol on April 2, 2008 during Dolly Parton week. After an emotional farewell, she performed "Do I Ever Cross Your Mind" one final time following her elimination. Malubay had never been in the Bottom 3 prior to her elimination. During American Idol, she was roommates with Syesha Mercado and Brooke White. It was frequently shown that a friendship formed between Malubay and fellow Idol contestants Danny Noriega, Kady Malloy and third-place finisher Syesha Mercado. Malubay also mentioned during her pre-performance video interview for Top 11 week that she had formed close bonds with fifth place finalist Brooke White and eventual winner David Cook. Her musical influences are Aretha Franklin, Jackson 5, Mariah Carey, Lani Misalucha and Regine Velasquez, citing the latter as her favorite performer.

=== Performances ===
Week #	Theme	Song choice	Original artist	Order #	Result
Audition (Miami)	N/A	"Natural Woman"	Aretha Franklin	N/A	Advanced
Hollywood (Round 1)	N/A	"Until You Come Back to Me (That's What I'm Gonna Do)"	Aretha Franklin	N/A	Advanced
Hollywood (Round 2)	N/A	"I've Got The Music In Me"	The Kiki Dee Band	N/A	Advanced
Top 24 (12 Women)	1960s	"You Don't Have to Say You Love Me"	Dusty Springfield	10	Safe
Top 20 (10 Women)	1970s	"Don't Leave Me This Way"	Harold Melvin	4	Safe
Top 16 (8 Women)	1980s	"Against All Odds (Take a Look at Me Now)"	Phil Collins	6	Safe
Top 12	Lennon–McCartney	"In My Life"	The Beatles	3	Safe
Top 11	The Beatles	"I Should Have Known Better"	The Beatles	11	Safe
Top 10	Year They Were Born	"Alone"	i-TEN	1	Safe
Top 9	Dolly Parton	"Do I Ever Cross Your Mind"	Dolly Parton	3	Eliminated

== Post-Idol ==
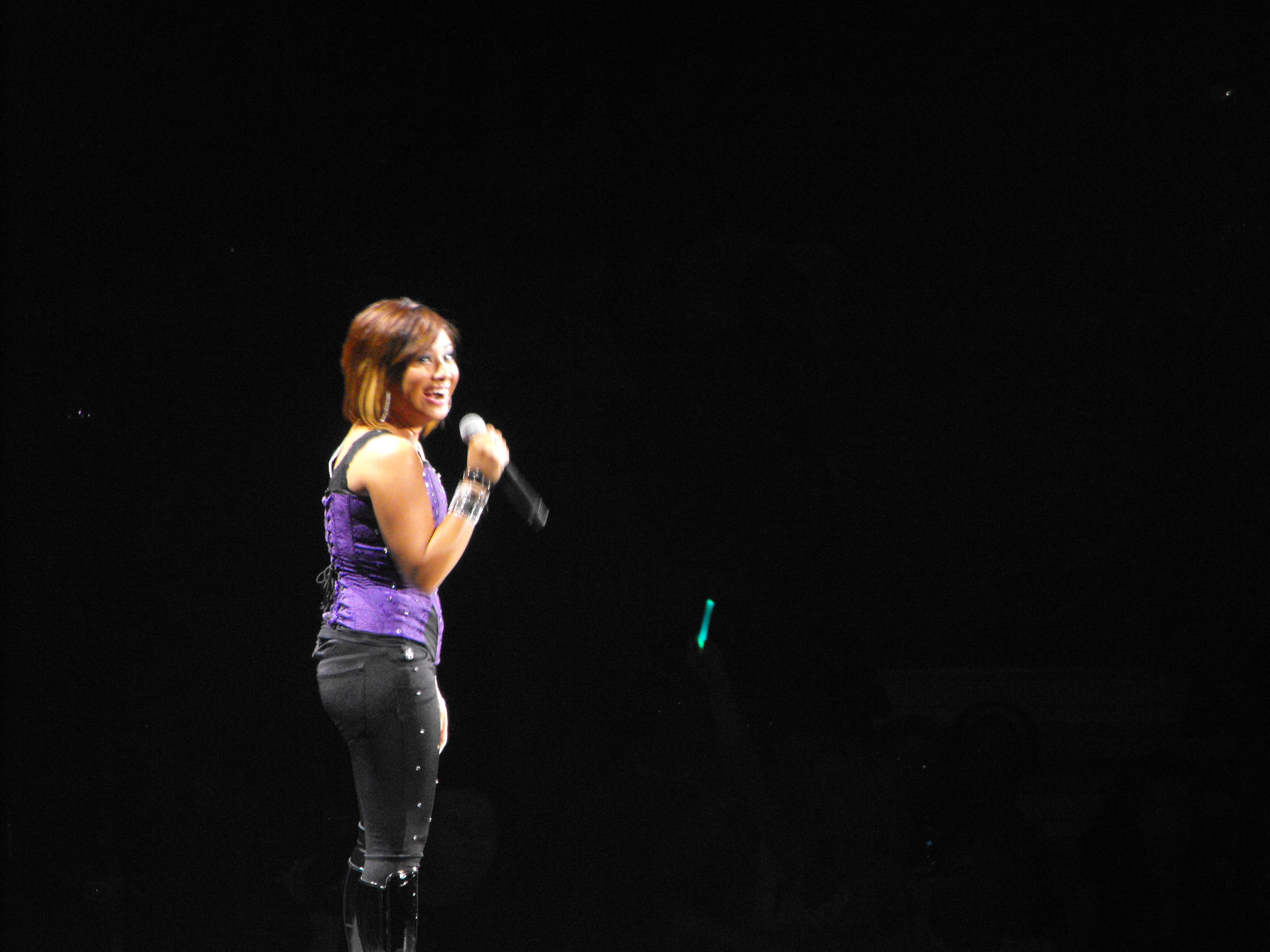
Malubay performing during the American Idols Live! Tour 2008.

Malubay completed the American Idols LIVE! Tour 2008, performing with the other American Idol Top 10 finalists during the summer. She expressed her willingness to go to the Philippines to pursue her career, following the footsteps of fellow Idol alumna Jasmine Trias. If she is not successful as a singer, Malubay intends to return to school and pursue acting.

Her appearances after elimination includes Live with Regis and Kelly, The Tonight Show with Jay Leno, the Today show, The Sauce, The Morning Show with Mike and Juliet, Access Hollywood and The Ellen DeGeneres Show. She expressed her willingness to work with Disney during her appearance on The Morning Show. In 2008, she was nominated as a Favorite TV Personality by the JC Penney Asian Excellence Awards. She performed in a concert in the Philippines with Ogie Alcasid and Pinoy Idol finalists Gretchen Espina, Jayann Bautista Ram Chaves, and Robby Navarro, in December 2007.

On November 14, 2009, Ramiele performed the American national anthem before the main event fight between Manny Pacquiao and Miguel Ángel Cotto at the MGM Grand Las Vegas. She was billed as "Ramiele".

== Discography ==
=== Singles ===
- "We Are One (This Christmas)" (2008)
- "Kaya" (2008)
- "More To Me" (2008)
- "Here I Am" (2008)
