= Amanda Overmyer =

American singer

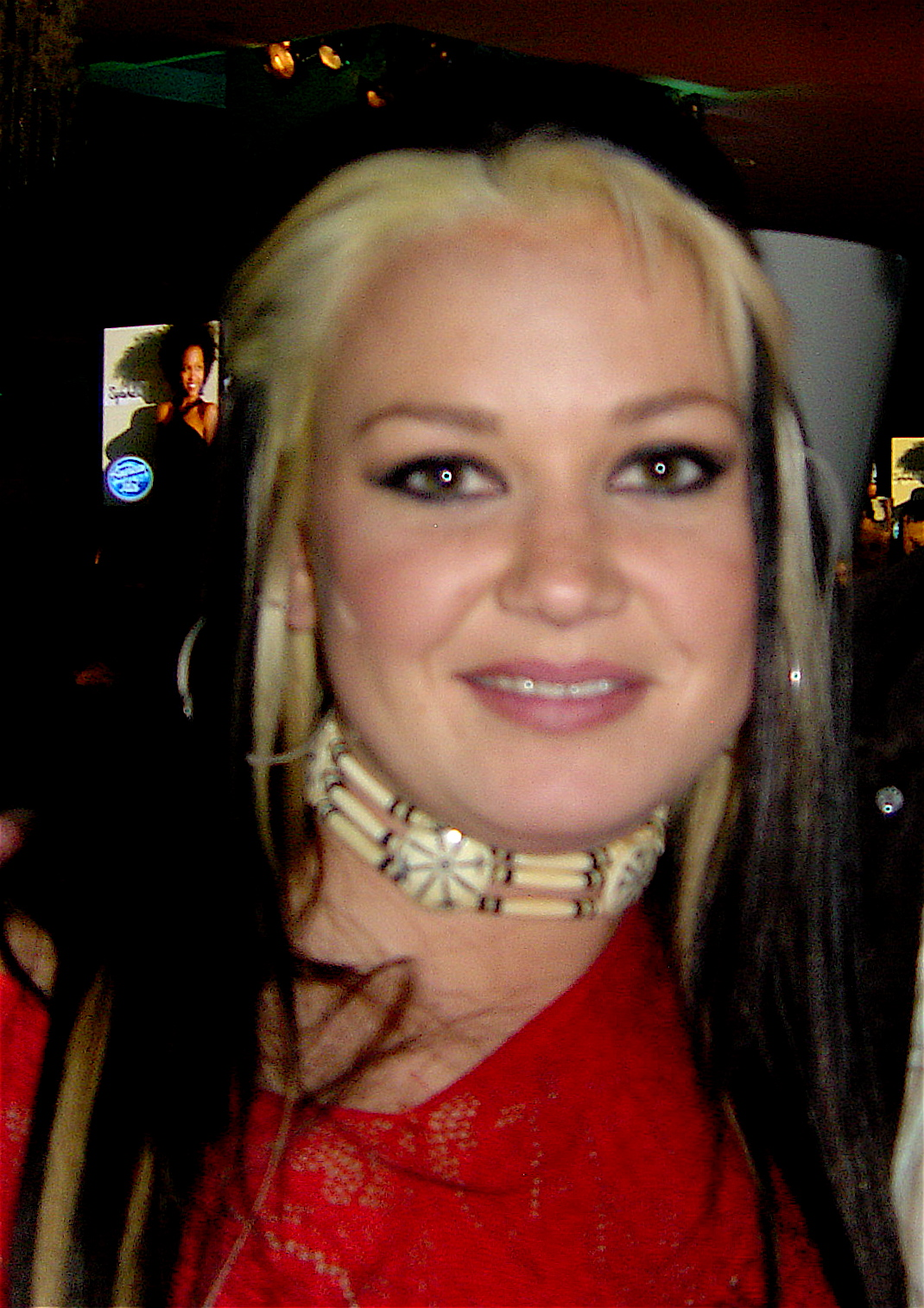
- Amanda Overmyer at the American Idol, Season 7, Top 12 after party on March 6, 2008.

Background information
- Born: Amanda Lindsay Overmyer; October 26, 1984 (age 41)
- Genres: Southern rock, blues rock
- Occupation: Singer-songwriter
- Instruments: Vocals, guitar
- Years active: 2008–present
- Website: overmyerproductions.com

Amanda Lindsay Overmyer (born October 26, 1984) is an American rock singer-songwriter who was the eleventh place finalist on the seventh season of American Idol.

== Biography ==
Overmyer grew up in Camden, Indiana, and attended Delphi Community High School in Delphi, Indiana. She began singing in bands as a teenager, and followed the styles of Southern rock musicians that her dad listened to, like Bob Seger, Kansas, Lynyrd Skynyrd, and Led Zeppelin. She often played at biker rallies.

She eventually left music, and earned nursing degree from Ivy Tech Community College and started to work in healthcare.

== American Idol ==
=== Overview ===
She tried out for American Idol to give music one more try. She became known as the "biker chick" and her sound was compared to Janis Joplin. Overmyer was eliminated on the March 19, 2008, episode of American Idol, putting her in 11th place.

The American Idol judges have often compared her sound to Janis Joplin. Overmyer was eliminated on the March 19, 2008, episode of American Idol, putting her in 11th place and just missing out on the tour.

After her ouster on the April 23, 2008, episode, fellow finalist Carly Smithson stated in her post-exit interviews that Amanda Overmyer had been her favorite singer of the competition.

Overmyer is currently the only contestant from Indiana to become a finalist in American Idol history.

=== Performances ===
Week #	Theme	Song choice	Original artist	Order #	Result
Audition	N/A	"Turtle Blues" "Travelin' Band"	Big Brother and the Holding Company; Creedence Clearwater Revival	N/A	Advanced
Hollywood	N/A	"Light My Fire"	The Doors	N/A	Advanced
Hollywood	N/A	"Piece of My Heart"	Erma Franklin	N/A	Advanced
Top 24 (12 Women)	1960s	"Baby, Please Don't Go"	Big Joe Williams	4	Safe
Top 20 (10 Women)	1970s	"Carry On Wayward Son"	Kansas	6	Safe
Top 16 (8 Women)	1980s	"I Hate Myself for Loving You"	Joan Jett and the Blackhearts	3	Safe
Top 12	Lennon–McCartney	"You Can't Do That"	The Beatles	9	Safe
Top 11	The Beatles	"Back in the U.S.S.R."	The Beatles	1	Eliminated

== Post-Idol ==
After her elimination from American Idol, Overmyer made appearances on The Ellen DeGeneres Show, Live with Regis and Kelly, and The Morning Show with Mike and Juliet.

On May 24, 2008, Overmyer headlined the Women of Rock show at the Whisky a Go Go in West Hollywood, California.

On December 10, 2008, Overmyer released her debut album "Solidify". "Play On" was the debut single from the album and is dedicated to her husband.

Her biggest show was in her hometown of Lafayette, Indiana during the summer of 2009, where nearly 14,000 fans came out and watched her perform with her band. In 2009, her band went through a lineup change, and Overmyer auditioned a session guitarist from Purdue University.

Overmyer and her band have toured extensively, chiefly in the midwest, since her appearance on Idol through 2014. She announced on YouTube in November 2013 that, in addition to future live shows, she will be writing new music for an upcoming album.

== Discography ==
=== Albums ===
Solidify

Studio album by Amanda Overmyer
- Released: December 10, 2008 (online); 2009 (In store)
- Recorded: 2008
- Genre: Hard rock
- Label: Chile Records
- Producer: Rocco Guarino

== Track listing ==
1. "Fail to Compromise"
2. "Love Me Like You Want"
3. "Hole in the Wall"
4. "Play On"
5. "Call Your Mama"
6. "Fight Like a Son"
7. "Lay It Down"
8. "Varmint Rifle"
9. "Iroquois Lane"
10. "A Long Time"
11. "Let's Take It Outside"
12. "Pray"

=== Singles ===
- "Play On" (2008)
- "Love Me Like You Want" (2009)
