= Chikezie =

American singer

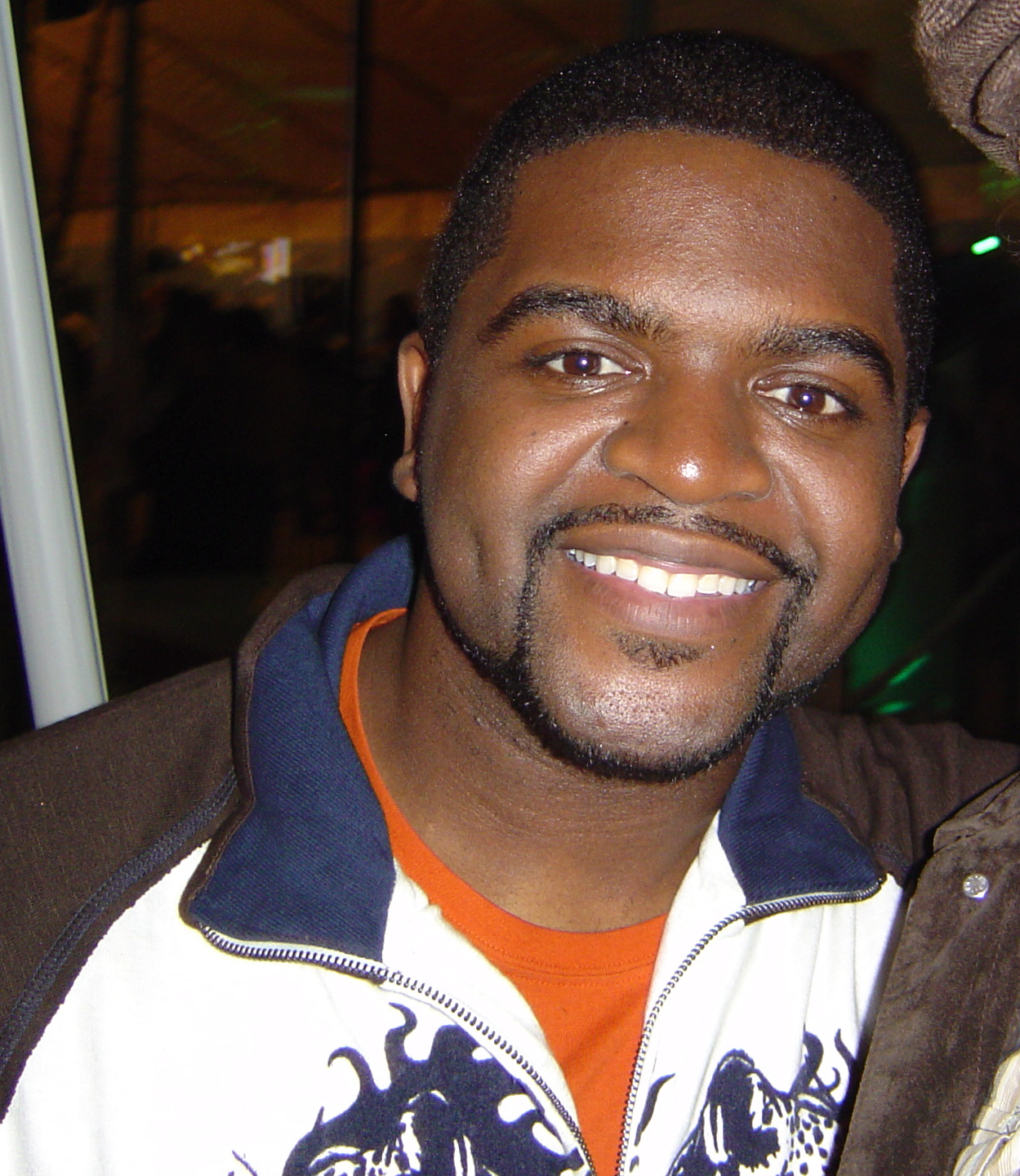
- Chikezie in 2008

Background information
- Born: Inglewood, California, US
- Genres: R&B, soul
- Occupation: Singer
- Instruments: Vocals, guitar, harmonica
- Years active: 2007–present

Chikezie Eze (/ˈtʃɪkiːziː/) is an American singer and the tenth place finalist on the seventh season of the television series American Idol.

== Early life ==
Chikezie was born in Inglewood, California to Nigerian parents, attended high school at the Los Angeles Center for Enriched Studies in West LA and Bethel College in Kansas. Before auditioning for American Idol, he was a Transportation Security Administration screener and a cashier. He also attended Santa Monica College in Santa Monica, California.

== American Idol ==
Chikezie successfully auditioned for the seventh season of American Idol and made it to the top 12. He was eliminated on March 26, 2008, finishing in tenth place.

=== Performances ===
Week	Theme	Song	Original artist	Result
Top 24	1960s	"More Today Than Yesterday"	The Spiral Starecase	Safe
Top 20	1970s	"I Believe to My Soul"	Donny Hathaway	Safe
Top 16	1980s	"All the Man That I Need"	Linda Clifford	Safe
Top 12	Lennon–McCartney	"She's a Woman"	The Beatles	Safe
Top 11	The Beatles	"I've Just Seen a Face"	The Beatles	Safe
Top 10	Birth year	"If Only for One Night"	Luther Vandross	Eliminated

== Discography ==
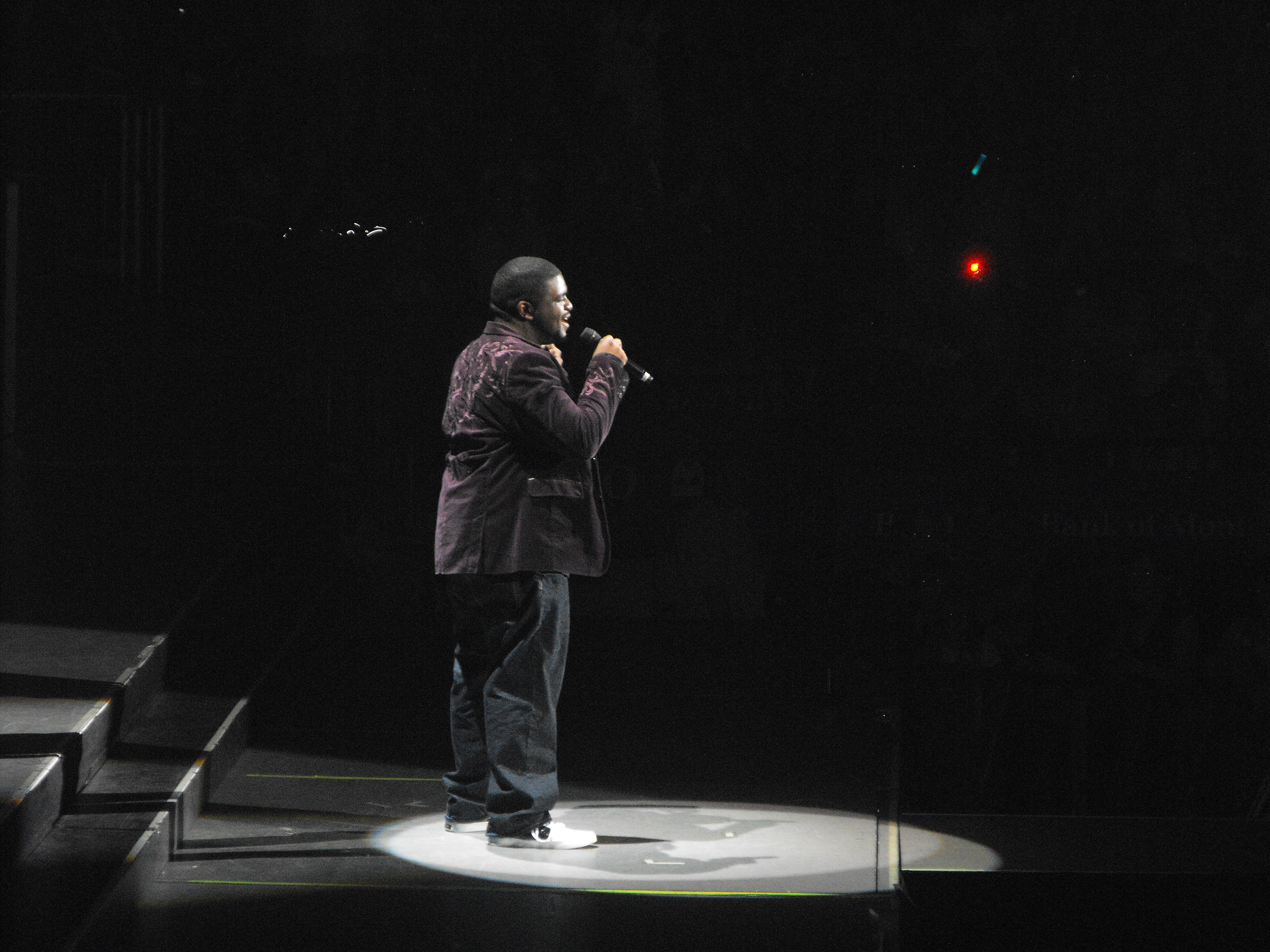
Chikezie performing during the American Idols Live! Tour 2008.

=== Singles ===
These are his most downloaded songs and performances from iTunes:

- 2008:"She's a Woman"
- 2008:"I've Just Seen a Face"
- 2008:"I Believe to My Soul"

=== Tours ===
- 2008: American Idols LIVE! Tour 2008
- 2009: American Stars In Concert - Wings Stadium, Kalamazoo, MI March 26, 2009
