= Take Stock in Children =

American non-profit organization

- Abbreviation: TSIC
- Formation: 1995; 31 years ago
- Type: Nonprofit organization (IRS exemption status): 501(c)(3)
- Purpose: Education
- Headquarters: Fort Lauderdale, Florida, United States
- Region served: Florida
- Method: Mentoring and scholarships
- Key people: Don Pemberton, founder Jillian Hasner, CEO and president Christine Knepper, chairman
- Website: takestockinchildren.org

Take Stock in Children Inc. (TSIC) is a nonprofit organization founded by Don Pemberton in 1995 and based in Fort Lauderdale, Florida. The organization aims to provide mentors and college scholarships to low-income students in Florida, in order to help students graduate and successfully enter a career. Since its inception, over 24,000 children have been enrolled in the Take Stock in Children program, which is active in over 800 Florida schools.

== History ==
In 1993, Don Pemberton founded the Take Stock in Children organization, to provide scholarships and mentors to at-risk students. In 1999, the program had its first graduating class. In 2010, the organization was awarded funds of around $5 million from the U.S. Department of Education's Investing in Innovation (i3) grant program. In 2013, Ted Carter was elected the chairman of the organization. In 2017, the program's division in Manatee County, Florida, collected used laptops to provide to the students enrolled in the program, with Cheryl Evans, TSIC's program coordinator for Manatee County, having stated "we were shocked to learn that many of our scholars are completing their homework assignments and even writing college essays on their cell phones". In 2009, Brothers Nick and Nathan Gupta raised money to buy brand new laptops for the recipients of the TSIC scholarship. This program, based in Santa Rosa and Escambia Counties has raised over $200,000 and a record $90,000 in the past three years.

== Activities ==
The organization offers volunteer mentors, college success coaches, and, ultimately, college scholarship to low-income students in Florida. Once in the eighth grade, students can apply for the program and have to meet income eligibility requirements while maintaining satisfactory grades in school. Children in the program are paired with adult volunteer mentors, who meet with their students at their respective schools for half an hour each week, and are trained, monitored, and evaluated by the TSIC program. Each student is also assigned a student advocate, who provides assistance and works closely with mentors and school staff. The TSIC program also provides college transition and college retention services for students' freshman year of college.

== Statistics ==
The organization has reported that 96% of students enrolled in the TSIC program graduate high school on time, and that 70% of TSIC students complete college, in comparison to the Florida state average of 25% for students in poverty.
