= Rissi Palmer discography =

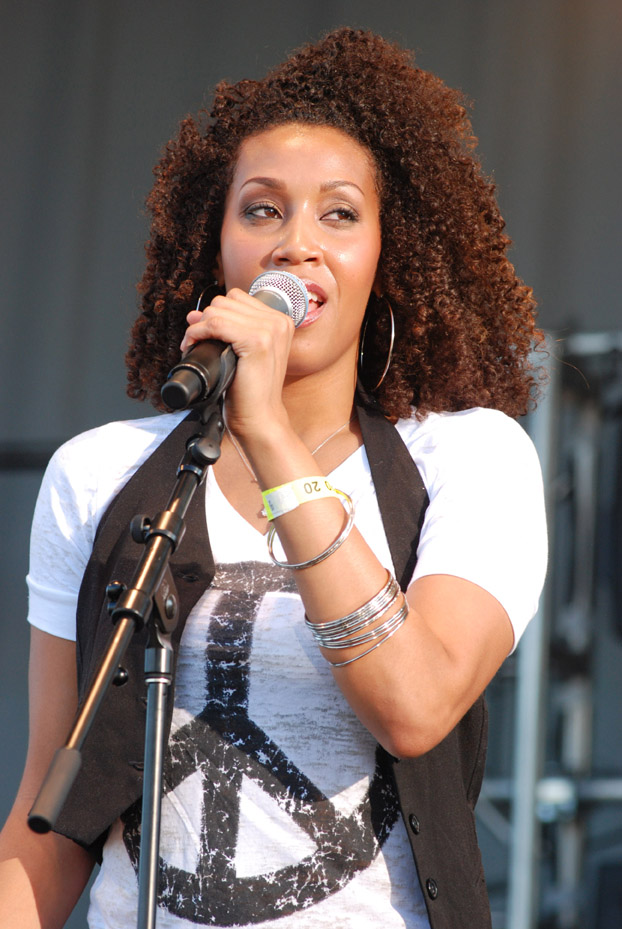
- Rissi Palmer live, 2008.
- Studio albums: 3
- EPs: 3
- Singles: 9
- Music videos: 7

The discography of American country music artist Rissi Palmer contains three studio albums, three extended plays, nine singles and seven music videos. After appearing on a program by Country Music Television, Palmer signed a record contract with 1720 Entertainment. In 2007, the label issued Palmer's first single titled "Country Girl". The track peaked in the top 50 on the Billboard Hot Country Songs chart that year. Her eponymous debut album was released in October 2007 and made various chart positions. The album spawned her second charting single titled "Hold on to Me".

In 2008, Palmer released a cover of Jordin Sparks' pop hit "No Air", which reached number 47 on the country singles chart. Palmer did not release a new record until 2013's Best Day Ever. The album was made following the birth of her daughter. In 2015, she issued an extended play titled The Back Porch Sessions. This was followed by her next studio album in 2019 titled Revival.

== Albums ==
=== Studio albums ===
List of albums, with selected chart positions, and other relevant details
Title	Album details	Peak chart positions		
Title	Album details	US Coun.	US Heat	US Ind.
Rissi Palmer	Released: October 23, 2007; Label: 1720; Formats: CD, music download	56	16	41
Best Day Ever	Released: January 15, 2013; Label: Baldilocks; Formats: CD, music download	—	—	—
Revival	Released: October 22, 2019; Label: Baldilocks; Formats: CD, music download	—	—	—
"—" denotes a recording that did not chart or was not released in that territory.

=== Extended plays ===
List of extended play albums, showing all relevant details
Title	Album details
Country Girl	Released: December 2, 2008; Label: 1720; Formats: Music download
The Back Porch Sessions	Released: May 26, 2015; Label: Rissi Palmer; Formats: CD, music download
3	Released: November 20, 2015; Label: Baldilocks; Formats: Music download
Perspectives	Released: February 6, 2026; Label: Rissi Palmer; Formats: Music download

== Singles ==
=== As lead artist ===
List of singles, with selected chart positions, showing other relevant details
Title	Year	Peak chart positions	Album
Title	Year	US Country	Album
"Country Girl"	2007	54	Country Girl
"Hold On to Me"	2008	59	Country Girl
"No Air"	2008	47	Country Girl
"Grown-Up Christmas List"	2008	—	—N/a
"Seeds"	2018	—	Revival
"Black Women in History" (with Fyütch and Snooknuk)	2021	—	—N/a
"Still Here" (with Miko Marks)	2023	—	—N/a
"—" denotes a recording that did not chart or was not released in that territory.

=== As a featured artist ===
List of singles, showing all relevant details
Title	Year	Album	Ref.
"My Body" (Pierce Freelon featuring Rissi Palmer)	2020	D.A.D.	
"It Took a Woman" (Tommy Atkins featuring Rissi Palmer)	2021	—N/a	
"Freedom (Juneteenth Remix)" (Gangstagrass featuring Rissi Palmer)	2021	—N/a	

== Music videos ==
List of music videos, showing year released and director
Title	Year	Director(s)	Ref.
"Country Girl"	2007	Kristin Barlowe	
"No Air"	2008	Kristin Barlowe	
"Sweet Summer Lovin'"	2015	Caleb Childers	
"Summerville"	2016	Caleb Childers	
"Seeds"	2018	Emil Gallardo	
"Soul Message"	2019	Pete Kimosh	
"You Were Here (Sage's Song)"	2020	Julienne Alexander	
