= Battlefield Tour =

2010 concert tour by Jordin Sparks

- Tour by Jordin Sparks
- The official poster for the Battlefield Tour.
- Associated album: Battlefield
- Start date: May 1, 2010
- End date: July 18, 2010
- No. of shows: 39
Jordin Sparks tour chronology
| Jesse & Jordin Live (2008) | Battlefield Tour (2010) |

The Battlefield Tour was a concert tour by American pop singer Jordin Sparks in support of her second studio album Battlefield. It is Sparks' first headlining tour. The tour consisted of mostly general assembly venues such as theaters, ballrooms, amusement parks, and casinos. It was initially only set to visit 15 cities nationwide. On April 22, several dates were rescheduled in order to expand the tour to 39 cities across the nation. The tour started on May 1, 2010, in Uncasville, Connecticut and ended on July 18, 2010, in Philadelphia, Pennsylvania. In an interview with AI Now, Sparks spoke of the tour "Hopefully, maybe in March I will be doing a tour. I would love to do a House of Blues theater type tour so it's a little more intimate...it's really fulfilling after you get off a stage like that, it's really awesome because it's like you can say 'hey, I left everything out there.'"

== Supporting acts ==
- Kate Voegele was the opening act on selected tour dates until June 25, 2010.
- Days Difference, a pop rock band, were also an opening act on selected dates of the tour.
- Ashlyne Huff replaced Kate Voegele as the opening act on June 26, 2010.
- Sid Curtis replaced Ashlyne Huff for one night, on July 10, 2010.

== Guest appearances ==
- Australian artist, Guy Sebastian made a guest appearance at three of Sparks' concerts in San Diego, Los Angeles and San Francisco from July 8 to July 10, 2010, performing their single "Art of Love" together

== Set list ==
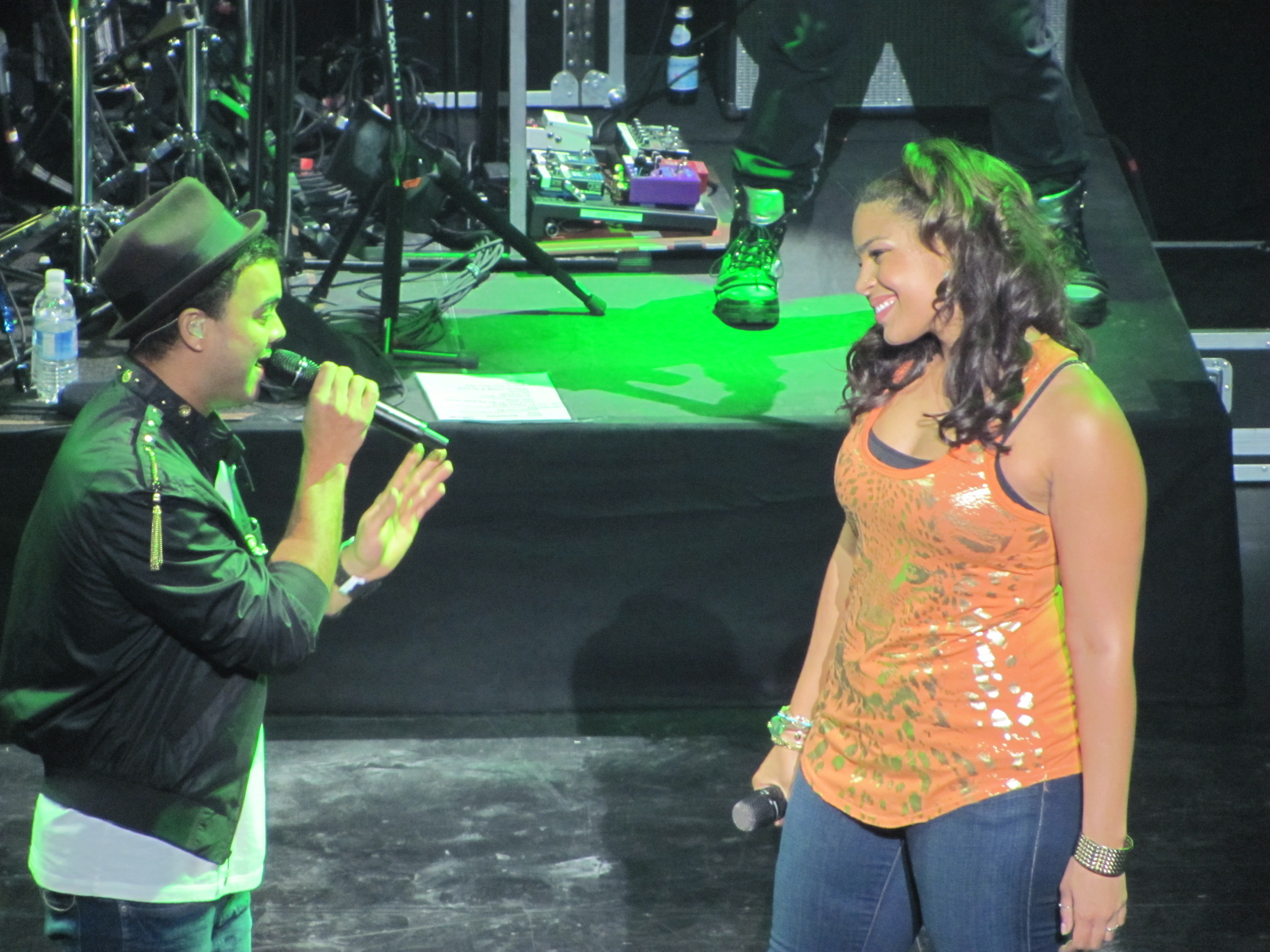
Guy Sebastian & Sparks performing "Art of Love" in Los Angeles.

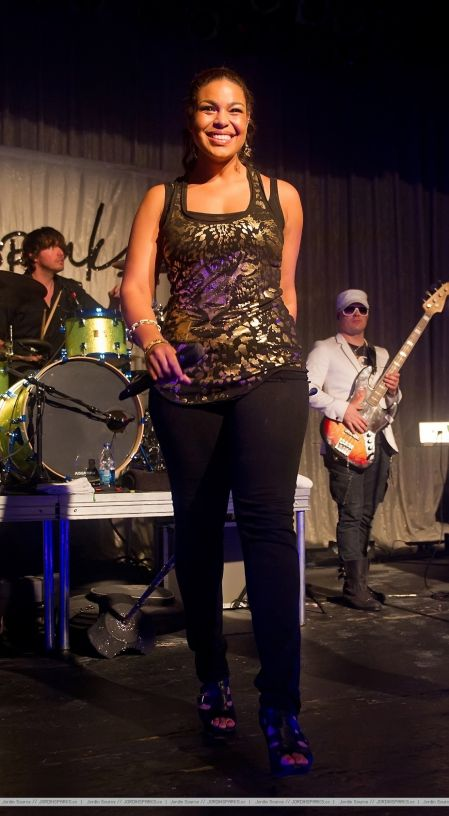
Sparks during Battlefield Tour.

1. "Battlefield"
2. "S.O.S. (Let the Music Play)"
3. "Watch You Go"
4. "Emergency (911)"
5. "It Takes More"
6. "Don't Let it Go to Your Head"
7. "One Step at a Time"
8. "Walking on Snow"
9. "Freeze"
10. "No Parade"
11. "Young and in Love"
12. "Tattoo"

Encore

14. "No Air"
Notes
- On selected dates, "Was I The Only One?" was performed.
- Sparks performed "Breathe", from the musical In the Heights performed June 22 to July 16, 2010.
- Sparks performed "Art of Love" with Guy Sebastian, her opening act, during the shows in San Diego, Los Angeles and San Francisco shows only.
- "Faith" was performed before the encore during the final show in Philadelphia.

== Band members ==
- Lead vocals: Jordin Sparks
- Keyboard: Scotty Granger
- Lead Guitar: JinJoo Lee
- Bass: Jesse Stern
- Drums: Micheal Bedard
- Backup Vocals: Brandon Winbush, Devin Micheal and Sharon Youngblood

== Tour dates ==
| Date (2010) | City (All U.S.) | Venue |
|---|---|---|
| May 1 | Uncasville | Wolf Den |
| May 2 | Hershey | Hersheypark Amphitheatre |
| May 4 | Westbury | Capital Bank Theater |
| May 5 | Verona | Turning Stone Resort & Casino |
| May 14 | Dubuque | Mississippi Moon Bar |
| May 28 (Note: Originally April 24, 2010) | Atlantic City | Tropicana Showroom |
| May 29 | Myrtle Beach | Myrtle Beach |
| June 3 (Note: Originally April 25, 2010) | Sayreville | Starland Ballroom |
| June 4 | Clifton Park | Northern Lights |
| June 8 (Note: Originally May 11, 2010) | Greensburg | The Palace Theatre |
| June 10 (Note: Originally April 27, 2010) | New York City | Nokia Theatre Times Square |
| June 11 (Note: Originally April 30, 2010) | Hampton Beach | Hampton Beach Casino Ballroom |
| June 12 | Hartford | Webster Theater |
| June 13 (Note: Originally April 28, 2010 at the Orpheum Theatre) | Boston | House of Blues |
| June 15 | Cincinnati | 20th Century Theatre |
| June 16 | Royal Oak | Royal Oak Music Theatre |
| June 17 | Cleveland | House of Blues |
| June 19 | Norfolk | Norva Theatre |
| June 20 | Charlotte | The Fillmore Charlotte |
| June 22 | Fort Lauderdale | Revolution Live |
| June 23 | Orlando | House of Blues |
| June 25 | Atlanta | Southern Star Amphitheatre |
| June 26 | Baton Rouge | Dixie Landin' Amusement Park |
| June 27 | San Antonio | Six Flags Fiesta Texas |
| June 28 (Note: Originally May 17, 2010) | Houston | House of Blues |
| June 29 (Note: Originally May 18, 2010) | Dallas | House of Blues |
| July 1 (Note: Originally May 20, 2010) | Tempe | Marquee Theatre |
| July 2 (Note: Originally May 23, 2010) | Anaheim | The Grove of Anaheim |
| July 3 | Reno | Knitting Factory |
| July 5 | Seattle | Showbox at the Market |
| July 6 | Portland | Crystal Ballroom |
| July 8 (Note: Originally May 21, 2010) | San Diego | House of Blues |
| July 9 (Note: Originally May 22, 2010) | Los Angeles | Club Nokia |
| July 10 | San Francisco | Regency Ballroom |
| July 12 | Denver | Ogden Theatre |
| July 14 | Kansas City | The Beaumont Club |
| July 16 (Note: Originally May 9, 2010) | Minneapolis | First Avenue |
| July 17 (Note: Originally May 13, 2010) | Chicago | House of Blues |
| July 18 (Note: Originally June 2, 2010) | Philadelphia | Theatre of Living Arts |

=== Cancellations ===
| Date (2010) | City (all U.S.) | Venue |
|---|---|---|
| April 23 | Columbus | Newport Music Hall |
| May 6 | Rochester | Main Street Armory |
| July 18 | St. Louis | The Pageant |
