= Idol Gives Back =

American charitable campaign (2008–2010)

- Formation: April 24, 2007
- Founder: Nigel Lythgoe; Ken Warwick; Cecile Frot-Coutaz
- Type: INGO
- Purpose: Raising money for underprivileged children worldwide.
- Official language: English
- Parent organization: American Idol
- Website: www.americanidol.com

Idol Gives Back was a charitable campaign that spanned two episodes of American Idol during its sixth season. A second Idol Gives Back concert and fundraiser occurred on April 9, 2008, during the seventh season of the show. Following the 2008 financial crisis and the subsequent Great Recession, Idol Gives Back was not held in 2009. The executive producer released a statement saying that it was not the time to be asking for money from the American public. However, the fundraiser returned on April 21, 2010, during the top 7 results show of season 9. It did not return in future seasons.

== Details ==
Idol Gives Back was the result of a collaboration between American Idol creator Simon Fuller and the British writer and founder of the British Comic Relief telethons, Richard Curtis. On the March 8, 2007 American Idol results show, Ryan Seacrest announced an initiative to give back to people in poverty in both Africa and the United States (including those affected by Hurricane Katrina). For every vote cast for the April 24, 2007 broadcast, sponsors donated funds to the Charity Projects Entertainment Fund. Richard Curtis and Simon Fuller based the program's premise on the UK-based annual charity event, Comic Relief. Curtis and Fuller spent 12 months adapting the concept and re-shaping it for a mainstream American audience. The 2007 event was co-hosted by comedian and then-talk show host, Ellen DeGeneres.

== Sponsors ==
=== 2007 ===
News Corporation pledged to donate 10 cents for every vote made to the show for the first 50 million calls, that is, up to $5 million. MySpace created a special profile page for the event in order to spread the word. Donations from viewers were accepted by phone and website during the April 25, 2007 results show, in a manner similar to a telethon. Near the end of the broadcast, Seacrest announced the show raised $30 million, with the final tally coming on May 1, 2007. In total, $76 million in corporate and viewer donations was raised as a result of Idol Gives Back.

In addition to public and News Corp donations, regular show sponsors and special contributors donated funds. These companies include Coca-Cola, Ford, AT&T, Allstate and ExxonMobil.

=== 2008 ===
The donation-per-vote model was dropped in favor of direct sponsor donations from Coca-Cola, ExxonMobil, Ford, iTunes, etc. and individual viewer donations made by phone and on the American Idol website. Exclusive videos of the night's performances were available for purchase on iTunes, with proceeds going towards the donation total. On the April 10, 2008 results show, Ryan Seacrest announced the running total raised to be $60 million, with the opportunity to donate still open. The final total of donations raised was $64 million.

=== 2010 ===
The same sponsors from 2008 returned for the 2010 Idol Gives Back. The special raised $45 million with the amount expecting to rise after proceeds from iTunes sales are added.

== Charities ==
The Charity Projects Entertainment Fund distributes the money raised to Save the Children, the Children's Defense Fund, America's Second Harvest, Boys & Girls Clubs of America and Children’s Health Fund to help disadvantaged children in the United States. The Global Fund to Fight AIDS, Tuberculosis & Malaria, Malaria No More, Nothing But Nets, Save the Children, and the U.S. Fund for UNICEF will receive money to fund programs in Africa. Some, however, voiced concerns about not knowing what funds they would be receiving afterwards.

== Idol Gives Back 2007 ==
Between contestant performances, video vignettes showcasing the judges and Seacrest visiting and observing stark conditions in Africa and United States were aired. Similar vignettes were aired during the results show. For this special, the voting period was doubled to four hours following the show, rather than the usual two. In response to the anticipated call volume, each contestant was assigned two toll free numbers. Over 70 million votes were cast.

The results show was broadcast from two locations—the American Idol studio and Disney Hall—and included celebrity actors and personalities: Kirstie Alley, Marc Anthony, Gillian Anderson, Kevin Bacon, Antonio Banderas, Jason Biggs, Blue Man Group, Jack Black, Emily Blunt, Bono, Michael Bublé, Sandra Bullock, Helena Bonham Carter, Tom Cruise, Matt Damon, Chris Daughtry, Micky Dolenz, Kyle Gass, Sarah Michelle Gellar, Hugh Grant, Teri Hatcher, Goldie Hawn, LeBron James, Chris Kattan, Keira Knightley, Lisa Kudrow, Hugh Laurie, Rob Lowe, Joel Madden, Benji Madden, Madonna, Eric McCormack, Ewan McGregor, Kevin McNally, Helen Mirren, Parminder Nagra, Shaquille O'Neal, Gwyneth Paltrow, Bernadette Peters, Dr. Phil, Miss Piggy, Seal, Rob Schneider, David Schwimmer, Ben Stiller, Twiggy, Harvey Weinstein, Forest Whitaker. The show also included numerous performers. Ellen DeGeneres co-hosted the event from the Disney Hall stage. Proceeds from ticket sales benefited the fund. Videos of the results show's performances were available for purchase on iTunes, with proceeds going to charity.

=== Performers ===
The performers included:

- Earth, Wind, and Fire - Medley: "Boogie Wonderland," "Shining Star," "September"
- Top 6 Contestants - "Time to Care," an anthem written and composed specially for the occasion by Quincy Jones, who conducted the band.
- Ben Stiller threatened to badly sing a rendition of Little River Band's "Reminiscing" until a total of $200,000,000,000 in donations was reached. Throughout the show, the camera cut to him continuing to sing as the goal was not reached.
- Il Divo - "Somewhere" (from West Side Story)
- Carrie Underwood performed "I'll Stand By You" in Africa, which was used as soundtrack for a video vignette.
- Jack Black humorously performed an excerpt of Seal's "Kiss from a Rose" for the judges, as Kyle Gass sat in the audience holding a rose, acting moved by the song. Randy and Paula panned his performance, with Paula mentioning that "the School of Rock called; they want their diploma back." Simon Cowell remarked that he was "better than Sanjaya." When asked by the judges, however, Seal jokingly proclaimed Black's performance the best rendition of "Kiss from a Rose" that he ever heard. Black also incorrectly identified "Kiss From a Rose" as being a song from the Batman Returns soundtrack. The track was actually featured in the third edition in the Batman series, Batman Forever.
- Fergie - performs her fourth single (fan favorite) song, "Big Girls Don't Cry", from her debut album The Dutchess.
- Rascal Flatts - "My Wish"
- Numerous actors and celebrities lip-synced and danced to The Bee Gees' "Stayin' Alive" in a humorous music video.
- Josh Groban backed by the African Children's Choir - "You Raise Me Up"
- Kelly Clarkson with Jeff Beck - Patty Griffin's "Up to the Mountain"
- A Simpsons animated short was aired with Bart as Ryan, Marge imitating Randy, Lisa imitating Paula, and Homer imitating Simon while listening to a much mellowed Simon Cowell's audition of "Don't Cha". It was later released on The Simpsons Movie DVD.
- Celine Dion duet with Elvis Presley (together on stage with use of rotoscoping) - "If I Can Dream"
- Annie Lennox - "Bridge Over Troubled Water"
- Top 6 Contestants - "American Prayer"
- Green Day - "Working Class Hero"

==== Missing performers ====
Other musicians, such as Pink and Gwen Stefani, were advertised and scheduled to perform on the show, but neither of their performances were aired. Although their numbers were pre-taped along with the other guests', American Idol claimed they were not broadcast due to time constraints, but that their appearances will be featured in future episodes of the show. Gwen Stefani sang during the season finale, however it was a performance aired via satellite, and not the one she had pre-recorded for Idol Gives Back. Pink's performance was shown on one of the later episodes of the season.

=== Elimination ===
Due to the charitable element of the episode, no contestant was eliminated on the April 25th results show. All of the votes from that week were added to the next week's votes, and the bottom two contestants were eliminated.

== Idol Gives Back 2008 ==
The initiative returned on April 9 for a second consecutive year. The format changed slightly from 2007; the episode aired as its own special on Idol's regular Wednesday results night with an early start time of 7:30 p.m. EDT, running for 152 minutes from the Kodak Theatre and the regular Idol studio. The results show aired separately that Thursday. Vignettes showing celebrities visiting impoverished areas in the United States as well as Africa were again shown in between performances. Producers hoped to exceed last year's $76 million raised. Again, proceeds went to children's charities in Africa and the United States. The event did not exceed the previous year's total, but raised $64 million in total.

The following celebrities appeared or performed on the 2008 show, as well as the following results show: Adam Sandler, Alicia Keys, Annie Lennox, Ashley Tisdale, Barack Obama, Ben Stiller, Brad Pitt, Billy Crystal, Billy Ray Cyrus, Bono, Boyz II Men, Carrie Underwood, Cat Deeley, Celine Dion, Charlie Wilson, Cheryl Hines, Chris Brown, Chris Daughtry, Chris Jericho, Dane Cook, Daughtry, David Beckham, David Spade, Dr. Phil, Eddie Izzard, Eli Manning, Ellen DeGeneres, Elliott Yamin, Emma Bunton, Fantasia, Felicity Huffman, Fergie, Forest Whitaker, George Lopez, Geri Halliwell, Gloria Estefan, Gordon Brown, Heart, Hillary Clinton, Jack Nicholson, James Denton, Jennifer Connelly, Jim Carrey, Jimmie Johnson, Jimmy Kimmel, John Cena, John Legend, John McCain, Jonas Brothers, Jordin Sparks, Julianne Moore, Keith Urban, Kiefer Sutherland, Kobe Bryant, Kylie Minogue, Kyra Sedgwick, Mariah Carey, Maria Shriver, Maroon 5, Mary Murphy, Michael Kors, Michael Chiklis, Miley Cyrus, Minnie Driver, Nigel Lythgoe, Peyton Manning, Reese Witherspoon, Ricki Lake, Rob Schneider, Robin Williams (as "Bob" the "Russian Idol" from Narodniy Artist), The Rock, Roselyn Sanchez, Ryan Sheckler, Sarah Silverman, Selma Blair, Sheila E., Snoop Dogg, So You Think You Can Dance Season 2 and 3 finalists, Teddy Reilly, Teri Hatcher, Toby Keith, The Game, The Clark Brothers, Cole and Dylan Sprouse, Triple H, Tyra Banks, Vanessa Hudgens, Victoria Beckham and Whoopi Goldberg.

Ellen DeGeneres was originally set to return as a co-host, but eventually declined due to "a personal production pressure" according to producer Nigel Lythgoe. Instead, Degeneres appeared during a brief segment.

=== Performances ===
- Idol Top 8 sang Rihanna's "Don't Stop the Music" as past So You Think You Can Dance finalists performed various dance routines
- Snoop Dogg and Charlie Wilson performed "Can't Say Goodbye"
- Teri Hatcher (of Desperate Housewives) performed Carrie Underwood's "Before He Cheats" with Band from TV
- Miley Cyrus performed "Good and Broken".
- Fergie performed her single "Finally" with John Legend playing the piano
- Heart performed "Barracuda" and were joined by Fergie
- Annie Lennox played the piano and performed "Many Rivers to Cross"
- Carrie Underwood sang George Michael's "Praying for Time"
- Gloria Estefan performed "Get on Your Feet" featuring Sheila E. on percussion, as well as the So You Think You Can Dance finalists and professional dancer Fabienne Liechti
- Idol Top 8 performed "Seasons of Love" from the musical RENT
- Miley Cyrus performed once more, singing "See You Again"
- Daughtry performed "What About Now" in a video of their trip to Uganda
- Mariah Carey performed "Fly Like a Bird" with Randy Jackson on bass guitar
- The Top 8 closed the show with the Christian anthem "Shout to the Lord", together with the So You Think You Can Dance finalists and professional dancer Fabienne Liechti
- In a sequel to the previous year's "Staying Alive" video, a group of celebrities lip synced to The Monkees' "I'm a Believer" during Thursday's results show.
- Jordin Sparks performs with Chris Brown in "No Air" on Thursday’s results show and presented Platinum awards for sales "Tattoo" and "No Air" (over 1,000,000 units each) and Gold award for the Jordin Sparks album (over 500,000 units).

=== Elimination ===
The top 8 results show was held on Thursday, the day after the Idol Gives Back special. Michael Johns, Syesha Mercado, and Carly Smithson were in the bottom 3. Johns had the lowest number of votes that week; Ryan Seacrest mentioned the previous "Idol Gives Back" when no contestants were eliminated (and two were being sent home the following week), but then announced that Johns was eliminated.

== Idol Gives Back 2010 ==
Idol Gives Back returned on April 21, 2010, during the Top 7 results show on season nine.

President Barack Obama, Ben Affleck and Bill Gates all made appeals for donations. Elton John, Mary J. Blige, Alicia Keys, Carrie Underwood, Joss Stone, The Black Eyed Peas, Annie Lennox, Jim Carrey, Slash, David Cook, Victoria Beckham, Elliott Yamin, Josh Groban, Morgan Freeman, Chris Rock, Justin Bieber, Joe Jonas, Demi Lovato, Jonah Hill, Russell Brand, Jennifer Garner, David Arquette, Jane Lynch and Jeff Beck appeared. Queen Latifah hosted the show from the Pasadena Civic Center in Los Angeles, where The Black Eyed Peas, Elton John, Carrie Underwood, Jeff Beck, and Joss Stone appeared at the Pasadena Civic Center, while Alicia Keys, Victoria Beckham, and David Cook appeared at the American Idol studio. Mary J. Blige also appeared at the American Idol studio, with an all-star band featuring Orianthi, Travis Barker, Randy Jackson, and multiple other celebrities.

Annie Lennox was scheduled to make an appearance and perform live on the show, however, the eruption of the Icelandic volcano Eyjafjallajökull which began on April 14, 2010, caused chaos across Europe with every flight being grounded. Lennox was unable to perform in person, and a video featuring her vocals of the song she was going to sing was played instead.

In 2010, American Idol received a nomination for the Do Something TV Show Award from the VH1 Do Something Awards for its charitable work.

=== Elimination ===
Tim Urban was eliminated. Aaron Kelly and Casey James were in the bottom three.

==== Overtime broadcast ====
For the first time ever, the special ran overtime, running until 10:24 PM EDT (02:24 UTC, April 22). However, Ryan Seacrest did warn viewers at the end of the previous night's performance show that the show would run long, this time. The broadcast the night before had also run long, causing viewers to miss this warning as well.

== U.S. Nielsen ratings ==
Episode Number	Year	Airdate	Rating	Share	18-49 rating/share	Viewers (millions)	Rank (timeslot)	Rank (night)
1	2007	April 25, 2007	15.4	24	10.0/26	26.40	1	1
2	2008	April 9, 2008	10.3	16	6.6/18	17.60	1	1
3	2010	April 21, 2010	10.4	18	5.8/17	18.40	1	1
