= Battlefield (album) =

- Standard edition cover

Studio album by Jordin Sparks
- Released: July 17, 2009
- Recorded: January–June 2009
- Studios: The Record Plant (Los Angeles, CA); Mux Music Studios (London, England); Side 3 Studios (Denver, CO); Homesite 13 (Novato, CA); Mason Sound (Hollywood, CA); Conway (Los Angeles, CA); Annetenna Studios (Burbank, CA); DMP Studios (Mallorca, Spain); Strawberrybee Studios (New York, NY); The Stujo (La Vergne, TN); The Sound Kitchen (Nashville, TN); Legacy Studios (New York, NY)
- Genres: Pop; R&B
- Length: 44:45
- Labels: Jive; 19
- Producers: Benny Blanco; Cutfather; Scott Cutler; Toby Gad; Claude Kelly; Dr. Luke; Harvey Mason, Jr.; Carlos McKinney; Sam Mizell; Anne Preven; The Runaways; Lucas Secon; Ryan Tedder; Dapo Torimiro

Jordin Sparks chronology
Jordin Sparks (2007)	Battlefield (2009)	#ByeFelicia (2014)

Singles from Battlefield
- 1. "Battlefield" Released: May 8, 2009; 2. "S.O.S. (Let the Music Play)" Released: August 14, 2009; 3. "Don't Let It Go to Your Head" Released: January 8, 2010

Battlefield is the second studio album by American singer Jordin Sparks, first released on July 17, 2009 through Jive Records and 19 Recordings. Recorded from January to June 2009, contributions to the album's production came from a variety of producers, including Harvey Mason, Jr., Toby Gad, Claude Kelly, Ryan Tedder, Dr. Luke and Lucas Secon. Sparks co-wrote on seven songs that were included on various editions of the album.

Upon its release, Battlefield received mixed reviews from music critics, most of whom complimented the production and Sparks' vocal performance, but criticized its lack of originality in terms of pop music. It debuted at number seven in the United States, number 11 in the United kingdom and reached the top 20 in Canada, Ireland, and New Zealand. Though it peaked higher than her debut album, Battlefield was notably less successful than Jordin Sparks (2007). The album sold over 600,000 copies worldwide.

The title track was released as the lead single from the album in May 2009, peaking at number 10 on the US Billboard Hot 100. "S.O.S. (Let the Music Play)" was released as the album's second single in August 2009, followed by "Don't Let It Go to Your Head" as the third single. In further support of the album, Sparks opened for The Jonas Brothers on the North America leg of the Jonas Brothers World Tour 2009, and Britney Spears on the second leg of her 2009 Circus Tour. In May 2010, Sparks embarked on her first headlining tour in the United States, the Battlefield Tour.

== Background and production ==
Sparks confirmed in several interviews that the album would take the themes from the first single, "Battlefield". Then it was announced through the official press release that the album would be named Battlefield, after the first single, because it was central to the themes and other recordings for the album. Speaking of the lead song, Sparks said

"To me, the title 'Battlefield' is about strength and perseverance, things can go from good to bad in an instant, it could be family, friendship or work; and my favorite line in the song is, 'you better go and get your armor,' because it's telling you to be prepared for that time so that you can overcome it."

Sparks spoke to Billboard magazine about how the recording process was much different to that of her previous album. Her debut had been recorded in approximately 20 days due to the huge appetite that fans had for her music. On the new album Sparks took her time meaning that not only could she write some of the songs but also had time to make the sound more mature or reject records which she felt unhappy with. Writing for the album began in the middle of 2008.

=== Music ===
On May 18, 2009 it was revealed so far Sparks had recorded 30 songs for the album but would select songs that fit well with the first single "Battlefield" since that was now also the name for the album. Later in May during an interview with Digital Spy, Sparks revealed that she has been involved in writing songs for the album, in total contributing to about 12 of approximately 30 recorded songs. She also revealed that although the album had at that time produced no duets she was hopeful to collaborate with Leona Lewis for a powerful ballad. When asked who else she would like to collaborate with she said Fergie, Justin Timberlake, and Alicia Keys.

None of these collaborations materialized although Sparks did confirm in an interview that she had made a pact to record a duet with Lewis for her future album as she believes the duo could be the next "Whitney Houston and Mariah Carey". The reason cited for no duets on this album was a lack of time and tight deadlines. As mentioned previously there are no vocal guests on the album although Tedder can be heard single backing vocals and ad-libs on the album's title song "Battlefield". Originally the album was intended to feature one guest in the form of T-Pain who had produced and appeared on the song "Watch You Go" with his signature vocoder (singing autotune), but for unspecified reasons this version of the song was omitted and replaced with a solo version featuring just Spark's vocals. Furthermore, of the 12 songs she has penned four have made the final version of the album ("Emergency (911)", "Was I the Only One", "Faith" and "The Cure") whilst a further two are being used as promotional songs (bonus tracks "Vertigo" and "Papercut"). All together between 30 and 40 songs had been short-listed for inclusion in the album, from which the final track list was selected and mastered.

== Release and promotion ==
- July 20 – Good Morning America
- July 21 – Live with Regis and Kelly, Entertainment Tonight, Late Night with Jimmy Fallon
- July 22 – interviewed on The Today Show
- July 23 – interviewed on It's On with Alexa Chung
- July 24 – The Wendy Williams Show
- August 9 – appearance at the Teen Choice Awards
- August 17 – Live with Regis and Kelly
- September 17 – VH1 Divas
- October 13 – Performance of "S.O.S. (Let the Music Play)" on The Paul O'Grady Show in the UK.

The album was first announced to be released on July 14, 2009 in America by Sparks herself through Twitter and by Amazon.com. However it was then later confirmed through the official press release from Jive Records that the album would in fact be released a week later instead on July 21, 2009.

On May 10, Sparks went ahead with a planned photo shoot for the album's cover and future singles. A picture from the photo shoot was released in the aforementioned press release which shows Sparks wearing a partially buttoned denim jacket over a white dress, seen leaning against a big fan with stage lights shining through.

Sparks released a two disc deluxe edition featuring two bonus tracks at the same time as the standard edition, following in the footsteps of fellow label-mates Ciara and Britney Spears. In international markets, "Tattoo" and "One Step at a Time" from her debut album were included as bonus tracks to help promote the album; both songs were successful in their own rights, reaching top 20 in Japan, the UK and Australia with no promotion.

=== Singles ===
- "Battlefield" is the first single from the album peaking at number ten on the US Billboard Hot 100 and number five on the Canadian Hot 100. Internationally the song reached number three on the New Zealand Singles Chart, number four on the Australian Singles Chart, nine in Ireland, and eleven in the UK.
- "S.O.S. (Let the Music Play)" was confirmed to be lined up as the second single by Jordin Sparks on a radio interview with New York's Fresh 102.7. The song was released in Australia on September 4, 2009 and in the US on September 29, 2009. It was released in the UK on October 12, 2009. The video was shot in Los Angeles, California on August 10, 2009, with Chris Robinson serving as the director. He also worked with Sparks on the "No Air" music video.
- "Don't Let It Go to Your Head" is the third and final single to be released from the album. It was released as a digital download on January 8, 2010 in the UK only. It was released as a digital download with "Landmines" as the B-side.

=== Tour ===
On March 15, 2010 it was announced that Sparks was going on her first headlining tour, the Battlefield Tour in support of her second studio album of the same name. The tour kicked off on May 1, 2010 in Uncasville, Connecticut and saw Sparks performing at 39 intimate venues across the US such as theaters, ballrooms, amusement parks, and casinos. The tour ended on July 18, 2010 in Philadelphia, Pennsylvania.

== Critical reception ==
Professional ratings
Review scores
Source	Rating
AllMusic	3/5 stars
Digital Spy	3/5 stars
Entertainment Weekly	A−
The Guardian	3/5 stars
Los Angeles Times	2/4 stars
musicOMH	2/5 stars
Newsday	B+
Rolling Stone	2.5/5 stars
Slant Magazine	3/5 stars

Upon its release, Battlefield received generally mixed reviews from most music critics, based on an aggregate score of 63/100 from Metacritic. Entertainment Weekly critic Michael Slezak felt that "Battlefield certainly delivers on the artistic end: It's packed with more hooks than a fisherman's tackle box, none better than on the gorgeous title track, which sports a soaring chorus. Resistance is futile when Sparks, showing heretofore unseen vocal dexterity, takes to the dance floor to ward off a vixen who's barking up the wrong boyfriend. There is actually enough potential hits to keep the singer in heavy rotation until well into Idol's 10th season." New York Times critic Nate Chinen described Battlefield as an "expertly constructed second album." He felt that it "upholds a darker, more experienced tone without losing an ounce of melodrama. Ms. Sparks, now a worldly 19, has her principles, including a stake in overblown emotion." Similarly, Billboard's Monica Herrera noted that the "lyrical themes get a bit murkier on her appropriately titled sophomore effort, Battlefield." She found that the tracks on the album were proving that Sparks "can straddle pop and R&B, while also evoking the synergy between joy and pain."

Digital Spy's Nick Levine called Battlefield' "an album that improves upon Sparks' debut – it doesn't try so hard to cover all of the bases, and Sparks sounds more comfortable on the uptempo cuts – but has the same Achilles heel: a paucity of really memorable songs. Then again, faced with some tough choices and release date approaching, it's hard to blame Sparks – still only 19, lest we forget – for sticking a little too closely to the middle of the road." Slant Magazine critic Sal Cinquemani wrote that "Sparks is a pop artist and makes no bones about it here. Much of the album's running time is filled with the kind of soggy adult contemporary pulp that weighed down both the singer's self-titled debut and Leona Lewis's Spirit [...] As nice as it is to hear Sparks continuing to dabble in dance-pop, though, one wonders if it would have been a smarter move in terms of career longevity to try to build on the urban audience she started to cultivate with "No Air"." Caroline Sullivan, writing for The Guardian, noted that "the 2007 hit "No Air" gave you the breathy, cleancut gist; this second album employs the same tricks." She found that "Sparks sounds more comfortable with power ballads such as "No Parade"; and there's an inner Pat Benatar struggling to get out on the title track. OK if you like this kind of thing." AllMusic editor Stephen Thomas Erlewine found that "because the sound is of paramount importance, this does succeed as pure radio-ready product, which is enough for Sparks to sustain her momentum if not enough to give her some kind of identity to build a career upon."

Margaret Wappler from The Los Angeles Times noted that Battlefield "is a bid for recognition as an adult with her own mind, and it offers some positive signs [...] but the album lags in its second half with songs that feel half-baked and are not aided by clever production. Many were penned by Sparks, whose writing abilities are far from hopeless; they simply need more development." Less impressed, Ken Capobianco from The Boston Globe wrote that the album was "nowhere near the knockout the 20-year-old pop star should have delivered. Don't blame it on Sparks, who sings well and shows obvious signs of growing into her big voice (despite a continuing tendency to shout). The problem is the songs. If these are the best Sparks had to choose from for such a crucial project, we surely don't want to hear the rejects. Many of them, like the title track, are uninspired rehashes of things we've heard before." Camilla Pia from musicOMH felt that it was "all far too samey and in some places just plain plodding, and much like her peer Kelly Clarkson, it would seem that there just isnÄt enough to Sparks to make for an interesting 14-tracker. Probably best to stick to the singles then." The San Diego Union-Tribune wrote that Battlefield "may be the perfect title for Jordin Sparks’ sophomore CD, simply because you’ll struggle to get through her warchest of songs. The 12-track set is overloaded with too many songwriters and producers [...] Though all that talent is around, there’s no real direction."

== Commercial performance ==
Battelfield debuted at number seven on the US Billboard 200, selling 48,000 copies in its first week of release. It charted three spots higher, but also with lower sales than her debut album which had entered and peaked at number ten in 2007 with 119,000 units. By September 2010, the album had sold over 600,000 copies worldwide, and by July 2015, it had sold 190,000 copies in the United States.

== Track listing ==
Standard edition
No.	Title	Writer(s)	Producer(s)	Length
1.	"Battlefield"	Ryan Tedder; Sam Watters; Louis Biancaniello; Wayne Wilkins	Tedder; Watters; The Runaways	4:01
2.	"Walking on Snow"	Lucas Secon; Frankie Storm; Jeremy Shaw; Olivia Waithe	Lucas	3:29
3.	"Don't Let It Go to Your Head"	Josh Alexander; Fefe Dobson; Billy Steinberg	Harvey Mason, Jr.	4:10
4.	"S.O.S. (Let the Music Play)"	Ed Chisolm; Chris Barbosa; Mich "Cutfather" Hansen; Keely Hawkes; David Kopatz; Lasse "Pilfinger" Kramhøft	Cutfather; Pilfinger; Kopatz	3:34
5.	"It Takes More"	Secon; Andrea Martin; Carsten Mortensen	Lucas	3:34
6.	"Watch You Go"	T-Pain; Lukasz "Dr. Luke" Gottwald; Joshua "Ammo" Coleman; Benjamin "Benny Blanco" Levin	Dr. Luke; Benny Blanco; Ammo	3:52
7.	"No Parade"	Scott Cutler; Anne Preven; Dapo Torimiro	Cutler; Preven; Torimiro	3:31
8.	"Let It Rain"	Lindy Robbins; Toby Gad	Gad	3:45
9.	"Emergency (911)"	Jordin Sparks; Robbins; Gad	Gad	3:49
10.	"Was I the Only One"	Sparks; Christa Black; Sam Mizell; Shane Stevens	Mizell (Wyzell Productions)	3:21
11.	"Faith"	Sparks; Robbins; Gad	Gad	3:23
12.	"The Cure"	Sparks; Carlos "Los DaMystro" McKinney; Claude Kelly	Los DaMystro; Kelly^{[a]}	4:16
Total length:				44:45

North American iTunes Store pre-order edition bonus track
No.	Title	Writer(s)	Producer(s)	Length
13.	"Vertigo"	Sparks; Gad; Robbins	Gad	3:40

Deluxe edition bonus tracks
No.	Title	Writer(s)	Producer(s)	Length
13.	"Papercut"	Sparks; Gad; Robbins	Gad	3:37
14.	"Postcard"	Vito Colapietro; Neely Dinkins; Walter Whitney; Brandon Williams; Shaunise Harris; Stephan Jones	The Co-Stars	4:02
Total length:				52:24

International edition bonus tracks
No.	Title	Writer(s)	Producer(s)	Length
13.	"Tattoo"	Amanda Ghost; Ian Dench; StarGate	Stargate	3:54
14.	"One Step at a Time"	Lauren Evans; Cutfather; Jonas Jeberg; Robbie Nevil	Cutfather; Jeberg; Nevil	3:26

Japanese edition bonus track
No.	Title	Writer(s)	Producer(s)	Length
15.	"Landmines"	Sparks; Gad; Robbins	Gad	4:27

International iTunes Store edition bonus tracks
No.	Title	Writer(s)	Producer(s)	Length
15.	"Papercut"	Sparks; Gad; Robbins	Gad	3:37
16.	"Postcard"	Colapietro; Dinkins; Whitney; Williams; Harris; Jones	The Co-Stars	4:02

Deluxe edition bonus DVD
No.	Title	Director(s)	Length
1.	"Hangin' with Jordin Sparks"		11:27
2.	"Battlefield: Behind the Scenes"		9:27
3.	"Battlefield Photo Shoot"		6:57
4.	"Battlefield" (music video)	Philip Andelman	4:04

Notes

- ^{^[a]} denotes a vocal producer
- "S.O.S. (Let the Music Play)" samples "Let the Music Play", as written by Ed Chisolm and Chris Barbosaby, performed by Shannon

== Personnel ==
Credits for Battlefield adapted from Allmusic.

- Mark Alloway – mixing assistant
- "Ammo" – Producer
- Dameon Aranda – background vocals
- Louis Biancaniello – background vocals, keyboards, mixing, producer, recording
- Michael Biancaniello – guitar
- Jeff Bova – strings arrangement
- David Boyd – recording assistant
- Chris Carmichael – strings
- Scott Cutler – producer, recording
- Michael Daley – mixing assistant
- Eric Darken – percussion
- Toby Gad – engineer, instruments, arrangement, mixing, producer
- Serban Ghenea – mixing
- Aniela Gottwald – assistant engineer
- Lukasz "Dr. Luke" Gottwald – producer
- John Hanes – mixing engineer
- Mich "Cutfather" Hansen – music, percussion, producer
- Greg Hagan – guitar
- Dabling Harward – recording
- Keeley Hawkes – backing vocals, music
- Andrew Hey – guitar, recording
- Pete Hofman – mixing, editor, recording
- Sam Holland – engineer
- Ghazi Hourani – recording assistant
- Claude Kelly – vocal producer
- David Kopatz – music, producer
- Jay Henchman – assistant engineer
- Lasse "Pilfinger" Kramhøft – keyboards, music, producer
- Benjamin "Benny Blanco" Levin – producer
- Dave Lopez – editor, recording
- Manny Marroquin – mixing
- Harvey Mason, Jr. – mixed, music, producer
- Donald "Don E" McLean – bass, keyboards
- Sam Mizell – producer, programming, recording
- Carsten "Mintman" Mortensen – Guitar – Drums – Keyboards – Bass Guitar – Arranger
- Faheem Najm – producer
- Scott Naughton – engineer, recording
- Mike Payne – guitar
- Christian Plata – mixing assistant
- Tim Roberts – mixing engineer (assistant), assistant engineer
- Lucas Secon – mixing, instruments, producer, programming, arrangement, recording
- Jeremy Shaw – instruments
- Adam B Smith – programming
- Ryan Tedder – background vocals, bass, guitar, keyboards, producer
- Dapo Torimiro – guitars, programming, keyboards, producer, recording
- Javier Valverde – engineer
- Sam Watters – mixing, producers, recording
- Billy Whittington – vocal recording
- Wayne Wilkins – keyboards, producer
- Emily Wright – vocal editor, engineer
- Noel Zancanella – recording

== Charts ==
Weekly chart performance for Battlefield
Chart (2009)	Peak position
Australian Albums (ARIA)	34
Austrian Albums (Ö3 Austria)	60
Canadian Albums (Billboard)	12
Dutch Albums (Album Top 100)	51
German Albums (Offizielle Top 100)	68
Irish Albums (IRMA)	17
New Zealand Albums (RMNZ)	17
Polish Albums (ZPAV)	39
Scottish Albums (Official Charts)	10
Swiss Albums (Schweizer Hitparade)	52
UK Albums (Official Charts)	11
US Billboard 200	7

== Certifications ==
Certifications for Battlefield
Region	Certification	Certified units/sales
New Zealand (RMNZ)	Gold	7,500^{‡}
United Kingdom (BPI)	Gold	100,000^{‡}
^{‡} Sales+streaming figures based on certification alone.

== Release history ==
Country	Release date	Label(s)
Netherlands	July 17, 2009	Sony Music Entertainment
Australia	July 17, 2009	Zomba, Sony Music
Ireland	July 17, 2009	RCA Records, Sony Music
United Kingdom	July 20, 2009	RCA Records, Sony Music
France	July 20, 2009	Jive Epic Records
Philippines	July 20, 2009	Zomba, Sony Music
Denmark	July 20, 2009	Zomba, Sony Music
Hong Kong	July 20, 2009	Zomba, Sony Music
Norway	July 20, 2009	Zomba, Sony Music
New Zealand	July 20, 2009	Zomba, Sony Music
Portugal	July 20, 2009	Zomba, Sony Music
Finland	July 20, 2009	Zomba, Sony Music
Colombia	July 20, 2009	Zomba, Sony Music
Costa Rica	July 20, 2009	Zomba, Sony Music
Czech Republic	July 20, 2009	Zomba, Sony Music
Canada	July 21, 2009	Jive Records, Zomba
United States	July 21, 2009	Jive Records, Zomba
Spain	July 21, 2009	Zomba, Sony Music
Sweden	July 22, 2009	Zomba, Sony Music
Thailand	July 23, 2009	Zomba, Sony Music
Germany	July 24, 2009	Zomba, Sony Music
Austria	July 24, 2009	Zomba, Sony Music
Japan	August 12, 2009	Sony Music Japan
Belgium	August 24, 2009	Zomba, Sony Music
Poland	January 11, 2010	Sony Music
