= Jesse & Jordin Live =

2008 concert tour by Jesse McCartney and Jordin Sparks

- Tour by Jesse McCartney and Jordin Sparks
- Associated album: Departure; Jordin Sparks
- Start date: August 5, 2008
- End date: August 30, 2008
- No. of shows: 18
Jesse McCartney tour chronology
Beautiful Soul Tour (2006)	Jesse & Jordin Live (2008)	Departure Tour (2009)
Jordin Sparks tour chronology
American Idols LIVE! Tour 2007 (2007)	Jesse & Jordin Live (2008)	Battlefield Tour (2010)

The Jesse & Jordin Live Tour was a co-headlining concert tour by Jesse McCartney and Jordin Sparks to support McCartney's third album Departure and Sparks' self-titled debut album Jordin Sparks. The tour started on August 5, 2008 and ended on August 30, 2008.

The month-long tour consisted of mostly United States venues with one Toronto date. Jordin and Jesse co-headlined every date except the Chicago and Buffalo, New York dates, where McCartney alone performed.

== Set list ==
Jesse McCartney
1. Freaky
2. Makeup
3. My Baby
4. Take 'Em Back
5. Beautiful Soul
6. It's Over
7. Rock You
8. Runnin'
9. Into Ya
10. She's No You
11. Oxygen
12. How Do You Sleep?
13. Buy You A Drank
14. Told You So
15. Relapse

Encore

16. Leavin'
Jordin Sparks
1. One Step at a Time
2. Just For the Record
3. Fallin'
4. Heartbreaker
5. Now You Tell Me
6. Freeze
7. Tattoo
8. Superstitious
9. Let Him Fly
10. Ain't No Other Man
11. Virginia is For Lovers
12. Permanent Monday
13. Give Me One Reason
14. No Air

Encore

15. The Way You Make Me Feel (with McCartney)

== Tour dates ==
Date	City	Country	Venue
August 5, 2008	Sacramento	United States	Community Center Theater
August 7, 2008	Los Angeles	United States	Orpheum Theatre
August 8, 2008	Glendale	United States	Jobing.com Arena
August 9, 2008	San Diego	United States	Humphreys Concerts by the Bay
August 11, 2008	Salt Lake City	United States	Abravanel Hall
August 13, 2008	Denver	United States	Ellie Caulkins Opera House
August 15, 2008	Minneapolis	United States	State Theatre
August 16, 2008	Chicago	United States	Park West
August 17, 2008	Royal Oak	United States	Royal Oak Music Theatre
August 19, 2008	New York City	United States	Nokia Theatre Times Square
August 20, 2008	Lowell	United States	Lowell Memorial Auditorium
August 22, 2008	Atlantic City	United States	Adrian Phillips Ballroom
August 23, 2008	Washington Township	United States	Commerce Bank Arts Centre
August 24, 2008	Pittsburgh	United States	Benedum Center
August 26, 2008	Buffalo	United States	Town Ballroom
August 27, 2008	Toronto	Canada	Sound Academy
August 29, 2008	Washington, D.C.	United States	DAR Constitution Hall
August 30, 2008	Greensboro	United States	War Memorial Auditorium
