= Jordin Sparks (disambiguation) =

Jordin Sparks is an American singer and actress.

Jordin Sparks may also refer to:

- Jordin Sparks (album), Sparks' 2007 debut album
- Jordin Sparks (EP), a 2007 EP released in advanced of Sparks' debut
