= Miko Marks =

American country singer

- Born: Miko Marks; Flint, Michigan
- Origin: Flint, Michigan
- Genres: Americana
- Occupation: Singer songwriter
- Instruments: Vocals, acoustic guitar
- Years active: 2005–present
- Labels: Mirrome, Brown Bear, Aspirion

Miko Marks is an American Americana singer based in Oakland, California. Born in Flint, Michigan, she first gained attention in the 2000s with the albums Freeway Bound (2005) and It Feels Good (2007). After stepping away from recording for more than a decade, she returned with Our Country (2021) and Feel Like Going Home (2022), the latter recorded with her band the Resurrectors. Marks made her Grand Ole Opry debut on October 14, 2022.

== Early life and education ==
Marks was born in Flint, Michigan, and has family roots in Mississippi. She has said that church and school chorus were early musical influences, and that her grandmother's love of the Grand Ole Opry and Hee Haw helped inspire her interest in country music. Marks attended Grambling State University in Louisiana from 1990 to 1994, where she studied political science with hopes of going to law school to become a criminal defense attorney, before later moving to the San Francisco Bay Area.

== Career ==
Marks began her career in Nashville in the early 2000s and was named Best New Country Artist at the 2006 New Music Weekly Awards. After stepping away from the mainstream country industry, she re-emerged in the 2020s within the Americana genre, earning new praise for her later work. Inspired by her mother who fought for equal rights, Miko Marks is known for helping challenge racial barriers in country music as a black female artist. Her debut single, "Freeway Bound," in 2005. It was followed by her debut album, also titled Freeway Bound, which was released on September 13, 2005. Three further singles — "Kickin' Back," "Mama," and "Don't Come Cryin' to Me" — were released from the album in 2006. "Mama" featured Marks' first music video, which included a guest appearance by Erykah Badu assuming the title role. Her second studio album, It Feels Good, followed in 2007 after the release of lead-off single "Locked and Loaded." Both albums were produced by Ron Cornelius and released under the Mirrome Records imprint.

In a review of It Feels Good, Stewart Mason of AllMusic gave the album three-and-a-half stars, comparing Marks to the Dixie Chicks and Gretchen Wilson and writing that it "clicks on every level, making it a solidly enjoyable neo-traditionalist country listen."

In 2021, Marks released “Our Country,” her first new album in over a decade. The album's lead single and music video are "We Are Here". In October 2022, Marks performed on the Grand Ole Opry for the first time. According to CMT, her performance received two standing ovations. In October of 2023, Marks collaborated with the Fisk Jubilee Singers for an updated version of her song "Jubilee".

== Life in music ==
Marks' music incorporates elements of Americana, blues, Southern rock, and gospel. After releasing her album It Feels Good in 2007, she stepped away from the music industry for more than a decade before returning in the 2020s with the Resurrectors.

== Family ==
Her single mother and grandmother raised Miko Marks. After college, she married David Hawkins, who currently works as a local firefighter in Oakland, California. They have one son, Justin, who travels with her to CMA Fests each year.

== Discography ==
=== Studio albums ===
Year	Album details
2005	Freeway Bound: Release date: September 13, 2005; Label: Mirrome/Brown Bear
2007	It Feels Good: Release date: August 21, 2007; Label: Mirrome/Aspirion
2021	Our Country: Release date: March 26, 2021; Label: Redtone
2022	Feel Like Going Home: Release date: October 14, 2022; Label: Redtone

=== Extended plays ===
Year	Album details
2021	Race Records: Release date: October 1, 2021; Label: Redtone

=== Singles ===
Year	Single	Album
2005	"Freeway Bound"	Freeway Bound
2006	"Kickin' Back"	Freeway Bound
2006	"Mama"	Freeway Bound
2006	"Don't Come Cryin' to Me"	Freeway Bound
2007	"Locked & Loaded"	It Feels Good
2019	"Roll Out"	
2021	"We Are Here"	Our Country
2022	"Feels Like Going Home"	
2022	"Trouble"	
2023	"Still Here" (with Rissi Palmer)	
2023	"Jubilee" (with Fisk Jubilee Singers)	

=== Music videos ===
Year	Video	Director
2006	"Mama"	
2007	"Locked & Loaded"	Edward Rosenblum
2013	"Help"	Edward Rosenblum

== Awards and nominations ==
Year	Association	Category	Result
2006	New Music Weekly	Best New Country Artist	Won
2006	The Independent Music Awards	Country Album of the Year – Freeway Bound	Won
2007	Independent Music Awards	Country Song of the Year – "Freeway Bound"	Won
2008	Independent Music Awards	Country Album of the Year – "It Feels Good"	Nominated
2008	Independent Music Awards	Country Song of the Year- "It Feels Good"	Won
