= Battlefield (song) =

2009 single by Jordin Sparks

Single by Jordin Sparks

from the album Battlefield
- Released: May 8, 2009
- Studio: Side 3 Studios (Denver, Colorado); Homesite 13 (Novato, California)
- Genre: Pop; R&B
- Length: 4:01
- Label: Jive
- Songwriters: Louis Biancaniello; Ryan Tedder; Sam Watters; Wayne Wilkins
- Producer: The Runaways

Jordin Sparks singles chronology
"One Step at a Time" (2008)	"Battlefield" (2009)	"S.O.S. (Let the Music Play)" (2009)

"Battlefield" is a song by the American singer Jordin Sparks, taken from her second studio album of the same name. It was written by Louis Biancaniello, Ryan Tedder, Sam Watters and Wayne Wilkins, while production of the song was helmed by Tedder and The Runaways. "Battlefield" was released digitally in the United States on May 8, 2009, as the album's lead single. "Battlefield" is a mid-tempo pop and R&B ballad which draws influences from pop rock and soft rock music genres. The song's lyrics revolve around "a tumultuous relationship where neither side wants to compromise." The song's lyrical theme received comparisons to Pat Benatar's "Love Is a Battlefield" (1983), and its production was compared to Benatar's "We Belong" (1984).

"Battlefield" was well received by most music critics who praised its production and lyrics. In the United States, "Battlefield" reached number ten on the Billboard Hot 100 chart, and number six on the Pop Songs chart. Outside of the US, it reached number three in New Zealand, number four in Australia and number five in Canada, reached the top ten in Ireland, and the top twenty in the United Kingdom. The song's accompanying music video was directed by Philip Andelman. It features Sparks on a field and flanked by flashing lights and smoke. To promote the song, Sparks performed on televised shows which included American Idol and Good Morning America. The song has been covered by English alternative rock band Fightstar which was performed on the television show One Life to Live.

== Background and release ==
"Battlefield" was written by Louis Biancaniello, Ryan Tedder, Sam Watters and Wayne Wilkins, and was produced by Tedder and The Runaways. The track was mixed by Biancaniello and Watters. The song was initially written with Christina Aguilera in mind, later it was also being considered as a duet for Rihanna and Chris Brown but the news broke that Brown had assaulted Rihanna, and Jive CEO Barry Weiss then decided to give "Battlefield" to Sparks. During an interview with Digital Spy, Sparks revealed that while she was in the studio working on another song with Wilkins, he asked her if he could play her a demo of "Battlefield". Sparks was pleased with the demo that was presented to her and asked her A&R if she could have the song. She later received a phone call which confirmed that she was to record "Battlefield". Sparks further elaborated about the song:

What grabbed me at first actually was the fact it was so big. The melody starts off very soft but then it gets massive and kinda angsty. I've had lots of friends who've gone through 'Battlefield' situations in their relationships, so when I was singing the song I put myself in their position and tried to imagine what they were going through. I got so, so into it and I think you can tell.

"Battlefield" was released digitally in the United States on May 8, 2009, and was sent to US contemporary hit radios on May 25. A digital EP with four remixes of the song was released in Australia, Germany, New Zealand and the United Kingdom on June 25. A CD single of "Battlefield", featuring an additional remix, was released in the United Kingdom on July 6, and Canada and France on July 7. "Battlefield" was released as a maxi single in Germany on July 17.

== Composition ==
"Battlefield"
"Battlefield" is a mid-tempo ballad, featuring Sparks singing "about a tumultuous relationship where neither side wants to compromise".

"Battlefield" is a mid-tempo pop and R&B ballad. It also derives from the genres of pop rock and soft rock. The instrumentation of "Battlefield" consists of a bass, piano, drums, percussion and guitar. "Battlefield" is set in common time with a moderate tempo of 144 beats per minute. It is composed in the key of G major with Sparks' vocal range spanning from the note of A_{3} to G_{5}. The song's lyrics revolve around "a tumultuous relationship where neither side wants to compromise", as stated by Jocelyn Vena of MTV News. Nick Levine of Digital Spy noted that "Battlefield" is based on the "love is war" metaphor. During the chorus, Sparks sings: "I never meant to start a war / You know, I never wanna hurt you / Don't even know what we're fighting for / Why does love always feel like a battlefield, a battlefield, a battlefield." Its bridge features the line: "I guess you'd better go and get your armor".

== Critical reception ==
Bill Lamb of About.com awarded "Battlefield" four-and-a-half out of five stars, writing, "'Battlefield' is the kind of song that screams instant hit from the first time you listen [to it]." Lamb also praised Sparks' "exciting, declaiming vocals" and wrote that she "is no minor talent, and she proves it here. From the first notes she is clearly in a vocal zone." Nick Levine of Digital Spy noted that the song bears similarities to Beyoncé's "Halo" (2009), but found the song "more bombastic, more overblown and, well, just plain better". A writer for The Insider stated that it was one of the songs on the album that proved why she won the sixth season of American Idol. Ruth Harrison of Female First magazine called the song "incredible", writing, "From the build-up of the verses to the epic chorus that is just made to be sung in arena's all over the world; the greatness of this song can really not be summed up in words." Adam Knott of Sputnikmusic called it "a massive, epic pop song", that is Sparks' best single release to date. Gavin Martin of Daily Mirror called "Battlefield" one of the most "epic metaphoric ballads" ever made by Tedder. Shereen Low of The Belfast Telegraph described it as a "radio-friendly song", while Ryan Brockington of New York Post called the song "simply pure pop magic".

Michael Slezak of Entertainment Weekly described "Battlefield" as "gorgeous", writing, "when Sparks hits that 'Better go and get your armor' bridge, you can practically feel the wind whipping through your hair." Johnny Dee of Virgin Media wrote that it was one of the song's "you cannot help but reach for any available nearby hairbrush and sing along to", despite calling the bridge a "clunking pedestrian pace and corny advice". Sal Cinquemani of Slant Magazine stated that "Battlefield" is as catchy as "Halo" and Leona Lewis' "Bleeding Love" (2007), and noted that the song's production was similar to Pat Benatar's "We Belong" (1984). This was echoed by Caroline Sullivan of The Guardian, who wrote that "there's an inner Pat Benatar struggling to get out." Nate Chinen of The New York Times stated that on "Battlefield", Sparks' "sounds vexed but in control, and undaunted by the copyright interests of Pat Benatar, who preferred her battlefield metaphors in declarative form", referring to Benatar's "Love Is a Battlefield" (1983). Joanna Hunkin of The New Zealand Herald noted that the song's lyrics were similar to Benatar's "Love Is a Battlefield", and criticized Sparks for plagiarism and not crediting Benatar as an inspiration.

== Chart performance ==
In the United States, "Battlefield" entered the Billboard Hot 100 chart at number 32 on the chart issue dated May 30, 2009. It peaked at number 10 on the chart issue dated August 8, 2009, and became Sparks' third top 10 hit on the Hot 100. As of July 2011, the song has sold 1,626,000 digital copies in the United States. In Canada, "Battlefield" debuted on the Canadian Hot 100 chart at number 34 on the chart issue dated May 30, 2009. After spending ten consecutive weeks on the chart, the song peaked at number five on August 8, 2009. On the New Zealand Singles Chart, it debuted at number 27 on June 8, 2009, and peaked at number three on July 20, 2009. The song was certified gold by the Recording Industry Association of New Zealand (RIANZ), denoting sales of 7,500 copies. In Australia, "Battlefield" debuted at number 34 on the ARIA Singles Chart on June 22, 2009, and peaked at number four on July 27, 2009. The song was certified platinum by the Australian Recording Industry Association (ARIA), denoting shipments of 70,000 copies. It also charted on the ARIA Urban Singles Chart, where it reached number one.

In the United Kingdom, "Battlefield" debuted at number 21 on June 20, 2009, and peaked at number 11 the following week. On the Irish Singles Chart, the song debuted and peaked at number nine on June 25, 2009. On August 1, 2009, it entered The Netherlands Single Top 100 chart at number 81. The following week, it ascended to its peak position at number 51. In Switzerland, "Battlefield" debuted and peaked at number 81 on August 2, 2009. On the Swedish Singles Chart, it debuted at number 54 on August 21, 2009. The following week, the song peaked at number 39 and spent three weeks on the chart. In Austria, "Battlefield" reached number 47.

== Music video ==
The music video for "Battlefield" was directed by Philip Andelman and filmed at the Golden Oak Ranch in California. On June 3, 2009, a thirty-second preview of the video was released online. The complete video premiered online on June 7, 2009. The video begins with a shot of a black car parked in the middle of the ranch's field. Sparks appears to be sitting in a car, dressed in black, as she sings the first verse. Intercut scenes of Sparks laying down in the field wearing a white dress are then shown. During the second verse, she exits the car and walks towards the camera. As the second chorus kicks in, Sparks is surrounded by smoke. During the song's bridge, she warns her love interest to "get his armor", as she appears to be surrounded by flashing lights and smoke. Then, intercut scenes of Sparks singing into the camera in front of a black backdrop are shown. The video then shows Sparks lifting her right arm in the air as missiles shoot up into the sky. The video ends by showing her covered in smoke. Jocelyn Vena of MTV News wrote that the video shows that Sparks is "definitely growing up". Maura of Idolator wrote that the video "is a simple affair that allows her to get into maximum drama mode."

== Live performances and cover versions ==
On May 13, 2009, Sparks performed "Battlefield" on the American Idol top 3 results show, and accompanied by Ryan Tedder who played the piano during her performance. The performance was praised by Bob Payne of The Seattle Times, who wrote that "Jordin looks and sounds great!". In June 2009, Sparks became a support act for the Jonas Brothers' world tour and performed "Battlefield" with the band. On July 20, 2009, Sparks performed "Battlefield" on Good Morning America. The performance featured Sparks in a black and white dress, performing with a backup band. The following day, she performed the song on Live with Regis and Kelly and Late Night with Jimmy Fallon. In August 2009, Sparks performed "Battlefield" during Britney Spears' North American leg of her Circus Tour, in which she served as a support act. The song was included on the set-list of her Battlefield Tour (2010).

On July 23, 2009, "Battlefield" was covered by British post-hardcore band Fightstar on BBC Radio 1's Live Lounge. Their performance of the song was included on a live DVD titled Unplugged at the Picturedrome. In May 2010, "Battlefield" was covered by the ABC television show One Life to Live in the musical episode "Starr X'd Lovers". In September 2010, contestant India-Rose Madderom sang a version of the song on the second season of The X Factor (Australia).

== Track listing and formats ==
- Digital download
1. "Battlefield" – 4:01
- Digital remix EP
1. "Battlefield" (Bimbo Jones Club Mix) – 6:43
2. "Battlefield" (Monk & Prof Mix) – 4:53
3. "Battlefield" (Funk Generation Club Mix) – 7:03
4. "Battlefield" (TONAL Club Mix) – 4:36
- CD single
1. "Battlefield" – 4:01
2. "Battlefield" (Bimbo Jones Radio Edit) – 4:08
- German maxi single
1. "Battlefield" – 4:01
2. "Battlefield" (Bimbo Jones Club Mix) – 6:43

== Personnel ==
Personnel are taken from the Battlefield album liner notes.

- Dameon Aranda – background vocals
- Louis Biancaniello – background vocals, keyboard, mixing, production, programming, recording, vocal recording
- Michael Biancaniello – guitar
- Jordin Sparks – lead vocals, background vocals
- Ryan Tedder – background vocals, bass, guitar, keyboard, production, programming
- Sam Watters – mixing, production, recording, vocal recording
- Wayne Wilkins – production, programming, recording
- Noel Zancanella – recording

== Charts ==
=== Weekly charts ===
Chart (2009)	Peak position
Australia (ARIA)	4
Australia Urban (ARIA)	1
Austria (Ö3 Austria Top 40)	47
Belgium (Ultratip Bubbling Under Flanders)	3
Canada (Canadian Hot 100)	5
Canada AC (Billboard)	24
Canada CHR/Top 40 (Billboard)	7
Canada Hot AC (Billboard)	5
Czech Republic Airplay (ČNS IFPI)	78
European Hot 100	23
Germany (GfK)	40
Global Dance Songs (Billboard)	18
Hungary (Rádiós Top 40)	34
Ireland (IRMA)	9
Japan (Japan Hot 100)	93
Netherlands (Dutch Top 40)	15
Netherlands (Single Top 100)	51
New Zealand (Recorded Music NZ)	3
Scottish Singles Sales (Official Charts)	3
Slovakia (Rádio Top 100 Oficiálna)	45
Sweden (Sverigetopplistan)	39
Switzerland (Schweizer Hitparade)	81
UK Singles (Official Charts)	11
UK Hip Hop/R&B (Official Charts)	6
US Billboard Hot 100	10
US Adult Contemporary (Billboard)	16
US Adult Pop Airplay (Billboard)	16
US Pop Airplay (Billboard)	6

=== Year-end charts ===
Chart (2009)	Position
Australia (ARIA)	45
Australia Urban (ARIA)	12
Canada (Canadian Hot 100)	49
Hungary (Rádiós Top 40)	165
Netherlands (Dutch Top 40)	74
UK Singles (Official Charts)	86
US Billboard Hot 100	57
US Mainstream Top 40 (Billboard)	29

== Certifications ==
Region	Certification	Certified units/sales
Australia (ARIA)	Platinum	70,000^{^}
New Zealand (RMNZ)	Gold	7,500^{*}
United Kingdom (BPI)	Gold	400,000^{‡}
^{*} Sales figures based on certification alone.^{^} Shipments figures based on certification alone.^{‡} Sales+streaming figures based on certification alone.

== Release history ==
Country	Date	Format	Label
United States	May 8, 2009	Digital download	Jive Records
Australia	May 12, 2009	Digital download	Sony Music Entertainment
New Zealand	May 12, 2009	Digital download	Sony Music Entertainment
United States	May 25, 2009	Contemporary hit radio	Jive Records
Australia	June 25, 2009	Digital EP	Sony Music Entertainment
Germany	June 25, 2009	Digital EP	Sony Music Entertainment
New Zealand	June 25, 2009	Digital EP	Sony Music Entertainment
United Kingdom	June 25, 2009	Digital EP	Sony Music Entertainment
United Kingdom	July 6, 2009	CD single	Sony Music Entertainment
Canada	July 7, 2009	CD single	Sony Music Entertainment
France	July 7, 2009	CD single	Sony Music Entertainment
Germany	July 17, 2009	Maxi single	Sony Music Entertainment
