= S.O.S. (Let the Music Play) =

2009 single by Jordin Sparks

Single by Jordin Sparks

from the album Battlefield
- Released: August 14, 2009
- Recorded: 2009
- Studio: Mason Sound (Hollywood, CA)
- Genre: Dance-pop
- Length: 3:34 (Album/Single Version); 3:15 (Video Edit)
- Label: Jive
- Songwriters: Chris Barbosa, Ed Chisolm, Mich Hedin Hansen, Keely Hawkes, David Kopatz, Lasse Kramhøft
- Producers: Cutfather, Pilfinger, David Kopatz

Jordin Sparks singles chronology
| "Battlefield" (2009) | "S.O.S. (Let the Music Play)" (2009) | "Art of Love" (2009) |

"S.O.S. (Let the Music Play)" is a song performed by American R&B and pop recording artist Jordin Sparks. It is the second single from her second studio album titled, Battlefield. The song was released first in New Zealand on August 14, 2009 and was sent to US radio on September 29, 2009. It was released in the United Kingdom on October 12, 2009.

"S.O.S. (Let the Music Play)" is a dance-pop song which contains a sample of "Let the Music Play" by Shannon. It combines 1980s synths with modern techno-dance beats. Sparks explained why she decided to go in a dancier direction with this song: "I'll always be the ballad girl from American Idol, but I wanted to try something new, though not so far that people wouldn't believe me." The video was shot in Los Angeles, California on August 10, 2009, with Chris Robinson serving as the director. He also worked with Sparks on the "No Air" music video.

As of May 2014, the single has sold 111,000 digital downloads in the United States.

== Critical reception ==
Reviews for the song were generally positive with critics praising Sparks' attempt at dance-pop. Nick Levine of Digital Spy said "Two excursions into dance-pop territory, the stomping, Shannon-sampling 'SOS (Let The Music Play)' and the boyfriend-baiting 'Emergency (911)', also do the business". The New York Times said "intriguingly, the music on that song ('Emergency 911'), and another club track, 'S.O.S. (Let the Music Play)', evokes the brazen dance-pop of Lady Gaga." A critic from Rolling Stone criticized the album and said that Sparks' album "falls flat on 'S.O.S. (Let The Music Play),' a piece of bland disco that wishes it were 'Just Dance.'" The Guardian appeared to praise Sparks for attempting a song that was more urban, stating that the "squelchy electronics and a relatively earthy lyric ('Look in her eyes, she's mentally undressing him') give 'SOS' an urban hue."

Entertainment Weekly commented that "second single 'S.O.S. (Let The Music Play)', with its refrain copped from Shannon's 1983 dance classic, may not be thrillingly original, but resistance is futile when Sparks, showing heretofore unseen vocal dexterity, takes to the dance floor to ward off a vixen who's barking up the wrong boyfriend." In the New York Post's review of the album it was said that "there are a lot of vocal and tonal departures on this disc, nowhere more so than with the thumpin' 'S.O.S. (Let The Music Play)'. This straight-outta-the-80s track (which will be her next single) is my fave on the whole album -- it's techno-summer perfection. And the hook is divine, despite its unexpected ancestry."

== Promotion ==
On August 25, 2009 it was announced that Sparks would be taking part in the 2009 VH1 Divas special on September 17, 2009 on VH1, where she performed the song. On October 13, 2009, it was also performed on The Paul O'Grady Show, and the following day on the National Lottery Show in the United Kingdom.

== Music video ==
Sparks flaunting one of the looks in the video for "S.O.S. (Let the Music Play)"

The video was shot in Los Angeles, California on August 10, 2009, with Chris Robinson serving as the director. He previously worked with Sparks on the music video for "No Air". The video shows Sparks dancing while wearing a gold dress and long gold nails. In interluding scenes in the video she can be seen dancing in a club wearing a black dress and hoodie. Her friend is seen watching her boyfriend flirt around other girls and texts Sparks. Once Sparks and her friends are reunited to catch her boyfriend with the other girls, he eventually sees her and shows signs of embarrassment. Sparks then blows a kiss to the camera.

== Track list ==
- Australian single
- "S.O.S. (Let the Music Play)" – 3:32
- "S.O.S. (Let the Music Play)" (Buzz Junkies Remix) (Club Mix) – 5:21

== Official version and remixes ==
- Album/Single Version
- Video Edit
- Buzz Junkies Club Mix
- Buzz Junkies Radio Edit
- Jason Nevin's Club Mix/Extended Mix
- Jason Nevin's Radio Edit

== Personnel ==
- Chris Barbosa – music, lyrics
- Ed Chisolm – music, lyrics
- Cutfather (Mich Hedin Hansen) – additional music and lyrics, production, percussion
- Pilfinger (Lasse Kramhøft) – additional music and lyrics, production, keyboard, programming
- David Kopatz – additional music and lyrics, production
- Keely Hawkes – additional music and lyrics, backing vocals
- Serban Ghenea – mixing
- John Hanes – mix engineering
- Tim Roberts – mix engineering assistant

== Chart performance ==
The song entered the UK singles chart 3 weeks previous to its release at 39, the following week rising to 18. It then peaked at number 15, a week before its physical release. On October 18, it rose to number 13. It is also her highest peaking record in Sweden, where it peaked at number 7. Her previous highest peaking record in Sweden was "No Air" in 2008, which peaked at number 10. The song sold 12,000 downloads on the week of the album's release. The song's sales stands at 111,000 in the US as of February 18, 2010. It is Sparks' first single to ever be number 1 on a US Chart (the Billboard Dance/Club play).

== Charts ==
| Chart (2009) | Peak position |
|---|---|
| Australia (ARIA) | 54 |
| Belgium (Ultratip Bubbling Under Flanders) | 14 |
| Canada Hot 100 (Billboard) | 46 |
| Canada CHR/Top 40 (Billboard) | 38 |
| Canada Hot AC (Billboard) | 16 |
| Czech Republic Airplay (ČNS IFPI) | 18 |
| Global Dance Songs (Billboard) | 12 |
| Hungarian Airplay Top 40 | 16 |
| Ireland (IRMA) | 36 |
| Netherlands (Dutch Top 40) | 15 |
| Netherlands (Single Top 100) | 51 |
| Romanian Top 100 | 5 |
| Scotland Singles (OCC) | 12 |
| Slovakia Airplay (ČNS IFPI) | 31 |
| Sweden (Sverigetopplistan) | 7 |
| UK Hip Hop/R&B (OCC) | 6 |
| UK Singles (OCC) | 13 |
| US Bubbling Under Hot 100 (Billboard) | 21 |
| US Dance Club Songs (Billboard) | 1 |
| US Pop Airplay (Billboard) | 31 |

=== Year-end charts ===
| Chart (2009) | Position |
|---|---|
| UK Singles Chart | 175 |
| Chart (2010) | Position |
| Romanian Top 100 | 46 |

== Radio date and release history ==
| Country | Date | Format | Label |
|---|---|---|---|
| New Zealand | August 14, 2009 | CD single | RCA/Jive Records |
| Australia | September 4, 2009 | CD single | Zomba Music |
| United States | September 29, 2009 | Airplay | Jive Records |
| Netherlands | October 2, 2009 | Digital download | Sony Music |
| United Kingdom | October 12, 2009 | CD single | RCA Records |
