= Jordin Sparks (EP) =

EP by Jordin Sparks
- Released: May 22, 2007
- Recorded: 2007
- Length: 17:35
- Label: 19 Entertainment, Fox Interactive Media

Jordin Sparks chronology
| For Now (2006) | Jordin Sparks (2007) | Jordin Sparks (2007) |

Jordin Sparks is an EP by American Idol season 6 winner Jordin Sparks. Sparks performed a song for the show each week of the season, and each song appeared on the show's website the day after the performance for sale as a studio version. The EP is a compilation of the four most downloaded of Sparks' songs, all of which are covers of other artists, plus "This Is My Now", an original single written by Jeff Peabody and Scott Krippayne, which she sang in the finale to win. It is considered a promo EP for her debut full-length album.

== Track listing ==
1. "I (Who Have Nothing)" – 2:51
2. "Wishing on a Star" – 3:41
3. "To Love Somebody" – 3:35
4. "A Broken Wing" – 3:38
5. "This Is My Now" – 3:51

== Charts ==
=== Album ===
| Charts (2007) | Peak position |
|---|---|
| U.S. Billboard Hot Digital Albums | 2 |

=== Singles ===
| Year | Single | Chart | Peak position |
|---|---|---|---|
| 2007 | "This Is My Now" | U.S. Billboard Hot 100 | 15 |
| 2007 | "This Is My Now" | U.S. Billboard Pop 100 | 16 |
| 2007 | "A Broken Wing" | U.S. Billboard Hot 100 | 66 |
| 2007 | "A Broken Wing" | U.S. Billboard Pop 100 | 64 |
| 2007 | "I (Who Have Nothing)" | U.S. Billboard Hot 100 | 80 |
