= Fabienne Liechti =

Swiss-American dancer

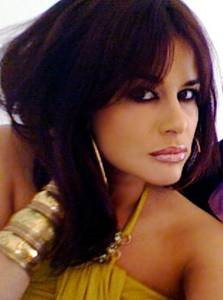
- Born: Zurich, Switzerland
- Occupations: Dancer; choreographer

Fabienne Liechti is a Swiss professional ballroom dancer and choreographer.

She is best known for her appearances with singer Gloria Estefan, drummer and percussionist Sheila E and So You Think You Can Dance dancer Dmitry Chaplin on the American live fundraiser show American Idol, Idol gives back on Fox Television. With American television host Carrie Ann Inaba and professional dancer Artem Chigvintsev she completed the instructional video series for ABC’s TV series Dancing with the Stars.

She is the multiple Swiss National Champion in Ballroom Dancing, a two-times Finalist at the French Open, Finalist at the German Open (World Super Series), Romanian Open, Holland Masters, Belgium Open, Swiss Dancesport Festival, took seventh at the Blackpool Dance Festival in Professional Rising Stars Latin and was awarded six-times by the Swiss Olympic Association for international high-ranked front achievements.

== Biography ==
Liechti was born in Zurich, Switzerland. She began her dancing career with four years old in a children's dance group. At the age of six she began taking ballet and ice skating classes, followed by ballroom dancing, piano and singing. When she was 18 years old, she moved to London where she began dancing with German professional ballroom dancer Sven Ninnemann for eight years.

Afterwards, Liechti moved to Los Angeles and undertook education in commercial acting and classical voice while working in entertainment.
