= Rissi Palmer (album) =

Studio album by Rissi Palmer
- Released: October 23, 2007
- Genre: Country
- Length: 43:16
- Label: 1720 Entertainment
- Producer: Drew Ramsey; Corey Rooney; Dan Shea; Shannon Sanders; Keith Thomas

Rissi Palmer chronology
Rissi Palmer (2007)	Best Day Ever (2013)

Professional ratings
Review scores
Source	Rating
Allmusic	Not rated link

Rissi Palmer is the debut album from country music singer Rissi Palmer, issued on 1720 Entertainment. It debuted at #56 on the Top Country Albums chart, in addition to peaking at #16 on the Top Heatseekers and #41 in the Indie charts. The album's two singles, "Country Girl" and "Hold on to Me", both charted on the Billboard Hot Country Songs charts.

== Track listing ==
1. "Hold on to Me" (Shaye Smith, Ed Hill, Rissi Palmer) – 4:04
2. "Country Girl" (Sarah Majors, Palmer, Cory Rooney, Shannon Sanders, Dan Shea) – 3:46
3. "Anybody out There" (Lisa Drew, S. Smith) – 3:18
4. "Hurt Don't Know When to Quit" (Hill, Palmer, S. Smith) – 3:00
5. "Mr. Ooh La La" (Lisa Chamberlin, Dave Smith, Deanna Walker) – 3:10
6. "All This Woman Needs" (James Dean Hicks, Palmer) – 3:36
7. "Flowers on My Window Ledge" (S. Smith, Hill, Palmer) – 3:49
8. "Leavin' on Your Mind" (Webb Pierce, Wayne Walker) – 2:42
9. "Butterflies" (Majors, Palmer) – 4:16
10. "Sweet Contradictions" (Frank J. Myers, Palmer) – 3:31
11. "Love You Like a Woman" (Majors, Palmer) – 4:23
12. "I'm Not of the World" (Majors, Palmer, Shea) – 3:41

=== 2008 re-release ===
The album was re-released on October 7, 2008 to include the album's third single, "No Air". The re-release also removes the album's first two singles.

1. "Anybody out There" (Drew, S. Smith) – 3:18
2. "Hurt Don't Know When to Quit" (Hill, Palmer, S. Smith) – 3:00
3. "Mr. Ooh La La" (Chamberlin, D. Smith, D. Walker) – 3:10
4. "All This Woman Needs" (James Dean Hicks, Palmer) – 3:36
5. "No Air" (James Fauntleroy II, Eric "Blue Tooth" Griggs, Michael Scala, Harvey Mason, Jr., Damon Thomas, Steve Russell) – 3:50
6. "Flowers on My Window Ledge" (S. Smith, Hill, Palmer) – 3:49
7. "Leavin' on Your Mind" (Pierce, W. Walker) – 2:42
8. "Butterflies" (Majors, Palmer) – 4:16
9. "Sweet Contradictions" (Myers, Palmer) – 3:31
10. "Love You Like a Woman" (Majors, Palmer) – 4:23
11. "I'm Not of the World" (Majors, Palmer, Shea) – 3:41

=== 2024 Remastered re-release ===
The album was re-released on April 26, 2024 and remastered upon the return of the masters to the artist. Additional songs from the 2006 Country Girl EP were included increasing the total to 15 tracks. Many of the songs contain instrumental changes which came from the original recording sessions. Rissi Palmer has also stated on Instagram a vinyl release is in the works.

1. "Hold on to Me" (Shaye Smith, Ed Hill, Rissi Palmer) – 4:06
2. "Country Girl" (Sarah Majors, Palmer, Cory Rooney, Shannon Sanders, Dan Shea) – 3:48
3. "No Air" (James Fauntleroy II, Eric "Blue Tooth" Griggs, Michael Scala, Harvey Mason, Jr., Damon Thomas, Steve Russell) – 3:54
4. "Anybody Out There" (Lisa Drew, S. Smith) – 3:23
5. "Hurt Don't Know When to Quit" (Hill, Palmer, S. Smith) – 3:02
6. "Mr. Ooh La La" (Lisa Chamberlin, Dave Smith, Deanna Walker) – 3:10
7. "All This Woman Needs" (James Dean Hicks, Palmer) – 3:37
8. "Flowers on My Window Ledge" (S. Smith, Hill, Palmer) – 3:51
9. "Leavin' on Your Mind" (Webb Pierce, Wayne Walker) – 2:44
10. "Butterflies" (Majors, Palmer) – 4:24
11. "Sweet Contradictions" (Frank J. Myers, Palmer) – 3:29
12. "Love You Like a Woman" (Majors, Palmer) – 4:25
13. "I'm Not of the World" (Majors, Palmer, Shea) – 3:46
14. "Roots and Wings" (Palmer, Amanda Wilkinson) - 4:26
15. "Remembering You" (Palmer, Shara Johnson) - 4:14

== Chart performance ==
Chart (2007)	Peak position
U.S. Billboard Top Country Albums	56
U.S. Billboard Top Heatseekers	16
U.S. Billboard Independent Albums	41
