= This Is My Now =

Single by Jordin Sparks
- Released: May 24, 2007
- Recorded: 2007
- Studio: Sarm West Coast (Los Angeles, CA); Westlake Audio (Los Angeles, CA)
- Genre: Pop, R&B
- Length: 3:50
- Label: Jive
- Songwriters: Jeff Peabody, Scott Krippayne
- Producer: Stephen Lipson

Jordin Sparks singles chronology
"This Is My Now" (2007)	"Tattoo" (2007)

"This Is My Now" is the debut single by Jordin Sparks. It was written by Jeff Peabody and Scott Krippayne. The top two finalists of the season 6 finale of American Idol (Blake Lewis and Jordin Sparks) sang it during the May 22 and May 23, 2007 finale shows. It was chosen over thousands of other entries in a songwriting contest for fan-written songs to be sung on the show. The song was later included as a bonus track on Sparks' eponymous debut album (2007).

Lewis sang it first during the May 22 show and received poor reviews from the judges, because the song was not Lewis' style of music. He later revealed in an interview that the producers of the show did not allow him to rearrange the song because "it was the song that won the contest". Sparks received better feedback and Simon Cowell stated that she "wiped the floor" with Lewis' rendition. Sparks sang a reprise of "This Is My Now" after winning the competition on the May 23 show.

== Commercial performance ==
"This Is My Now" is the first of nine American Idol coronation songs not to reach the top ten on the Billboard Hot 100 chart; the others are Kris Allen's "No Boundaries" (No. 11), Lee DeWyze's "Beautiful Day" (No. 24), Scotty McCreery's "I Love You This Big" (No. 11), Candice Glover's "I Am Beautiful" (No. 93), Caleb Johnson's "As Long as You Love Me", Nick Fradiani's "Beautiful Life" (No. 93), Trent Harmon's "Falling", and Maddie Poppe's "Going, Going, Gone". As of June 2009, the song has sold 301,000 downloads in the United States.

== Charts ==
Jordin Sparks version

Chart performance for "This Is My Now"
Chart (2007)	Peak position
Canada (Canadian Hot 100)	41
US Billboard Hot 100	15
