= Country Girl (Rissi Palmer song) =

Single by Rissi Palmer

from the album Rissi Palmer
- Released: June 4, 2007
- Studio: County Studio Q
- Genre: Country; contemporary country
- Length: 3:48
- Label: 1720
- Songwriter(s): Sarah Majors; Rissi Palmer; Cory Rooney; Shannon Sanders; Dan Shea
- Producer(s): Dan Shea; Cory Rooney

Rissi Palmer singles chronology
"Country Girl" (2007)	"Hold on to Me" (2008)

"Country Girl" is a song recorded and performed by American country music artist Rissi Palmer. It was composed by Palmer, along with Sarah Majors, Cory Rooney, Shannon Sanders and Dan Shea. It was released as Palmer's debut single on June 4, 2007 and reached a charting position on the Billboard Hot Country Songs chart. It was the lead single for Palmer's self-titled debut album, issued on October 23, 2007. The song received mixed reception from critics following its release.

== Background and content ==
"Country Girl" was composed by five writers, including Palmer herself. Co-writers were Shannon Sanders, Cory Rooney, Dan Shea and Sarah Majors. According to Palmer, "Country Girl" was about having a country "state of mind" and "how you feel", along with the "way you do things". The song also addresses how Palmer is black. In a 2021 interview, she recalled making the decision to include her skin color in the song: "In writing the song, there was a line in there about me being Black, and some thought maybe I don’t need to have it in there; maybe I don’t need to check all these boxes to be able to be put in one of those boxes." "Country Girl" was produced by Cory Rooney and Dan Shea at County Studio Q.

== Critical reception ==
"Country Girl" received mixed reviews from critics and writers. Billboard magazine praised the song upon reviewing Palmer's 2007 album, which it was featured on. Writers called it "a propulsive, soul-fueled stomp offering a useful lyric lesson about how you don't have to be 'a Georgia peach from Savannah beach' to identify as country. Meanwhile, William Ruhlmann of AllMusic gave "Country Girl" a less favorable response when reviewing the same album: "Her debut single, "Country Girl," which somehow took five people to write, attempts to be a crowd-pleasing anthem in the tradition of "Redneck Woman," but also to subtly address the issue that cuts both ways in her career, that she's an African-American from St. Louis trying to make it as a country singer in Nashville."

== Release and chart performance ==
"Country Girl" was released as Palmer's debut single on June 4, 2007. The song was the first by a Black female country performer to reach a charting position on the Billboard Hot Country Songs chart since the late 1980s. The Roanoke Times claims that the last Black female on the chart was Dona Mason with the single "Green Eyes (Cryin' Those Blue Tears)" in 1987, while Variety stated that Kathy Bee was the last in 1988. The track spent seven weeks on the Billboard country chart, peaking at number 54 in October 2007. It was the lead single for Palmer's debut eponymous album, also released in 2007.

Despite reaching a lower-charting position on the Billboard country survey, "Country Girl" received notable attention on Country Music Television. On the channel, the song's corresponding music video was played regularly during the fall of 2007. "I think Rissi's raw talent has enabled her to not have anybody look at her music with prejudice. When I see comments from what people think of her, it really boils down to the music," said a senior vice president for CMT. The music video was directed by Kristin Barlowe, who would also direct Palmer's next music video in 2008.

== Charts ==
Chart (2007)	Peak position
US Hot Country Songs (Billboard)	54
