= Rissi Palmer =

American singer-songwriter

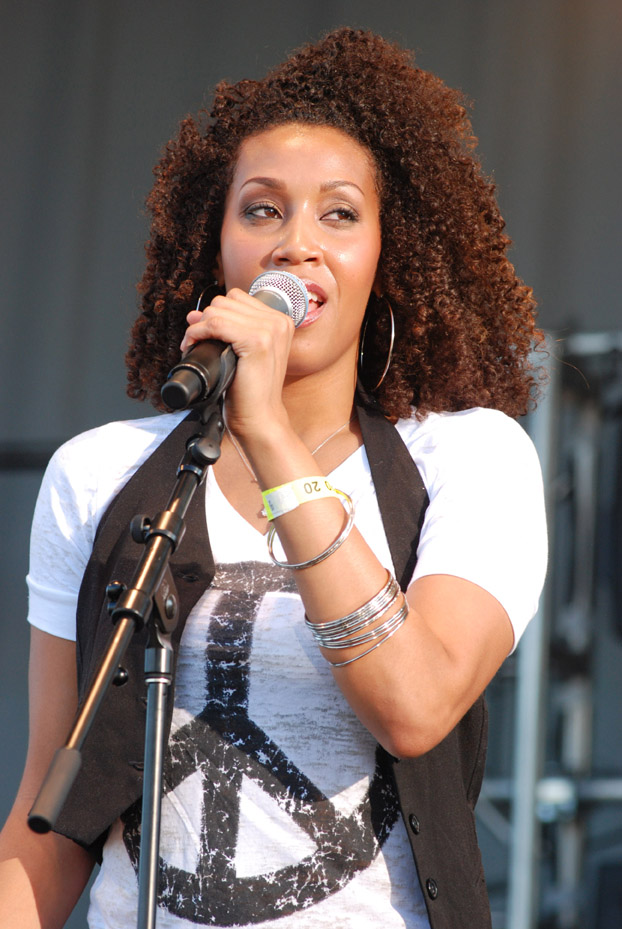
- Rissi Palmer performs at the Chicago Music Country Festival 2008 at Soldier Field

Background information
- Born: August 19, 1981 (age 45)
- Origin: Sewickley, Pennsylvania, U.S.
- Genres: Country; R&B; Southern soul
- Occupations: Singer; songwriter; radio host
- Years active: 2007–present
- Labels: 1720; Universal; Baldilocks; Invasion Group
- Website: rissipalmermusic.com

Rissi Palmer (born August 19, 1981) is an American country music artist. Palmer debuted in 2007 with the single "Country Girl", which made her the first African-American woman to chart a country song since 1988. "Country Girl" peaked at No. 54 on the Billboard Hot Country Songs charts, and served as the lead-off single to her self-titled debut album, which also produced the Top 100 hit "Hold On to Me". Also in 2008, Palmer covered "No Air", an R&B hit originally performed by Jordin Sparks and Chris Brown. She is also the host of Apple Music Country's show Color Me Country Radio with Rissi Palmer.

== Biography ==
Palmer was born in Sewickley, a suburb of Pittsburgh, Pennsylvania, and lived there until moving with her family to Eureka, Missouri, a suburb of St. Louis, at the age of 12. Her parents were natives of Georgia. Palmer has said her mother, who died when Palmer was seven, "was a huge Patsy Cline fan", while her father loved musicians such as Johnny Cash, Dolly Parton, Chaka Khan, and Santana. Palmer said she knew from a young age that she wanted to sing. As a child, she sang on a Mickey Mouse Club-like local television sponsored group called Team 11. At age 16, she performed country music at the Arkansas State Fair.

When she was 19, R&B producers James "Jimmy Jam" Harris III and Terry Lewis offered her a deal on their Flyte Tyme Records. Palmer rejected the deal because she said they wanted to turn her "twangy" country style into a "pop/soul hybrid." As she said, "I love R&B and urban music, but it wasn't what I wanted to do. I knew I wouldn't be happy doing that." After that, Palmer sang jingles for Barbie commercials, recorded music for the Dance Fever television show, and competed on Star Search, all while trying in vain for seven years to land a Nashville recording contract.

In 2004, Rissi was one of several African-American artists featured in the documentary Waiting in the Wings: African-Americans in Country Music, highlighting the contributions of African-Americans in country music while questioning why few have found success in the genre. The documentary aired on CMT on February 27, 2004.

Rissi performed at the 2nd Annual Black Girls Rock ceremony, along with Jean Baylor (formerly of Zhane) and Emily King in 2007.

Palmer was at the 2008 Democratic National Convention in Denver on August 26, 2008, and supported Barack Obama. She was also an invited performer at the White House for the National Tree Lighting Ceremony in December 2008.

Rissi starred in and hosted a Travel Channel show called Rissi Palmer's Country. The show was set to explore the music of a given city, and the pilot episode focused on the blues in Chicago. The pilot aired on February 28, 2009, but was not taken to series. In June 2024, she appeared in the country music documentary Rebel Country.

After a year and a half long legal dispute, Palmer parted ways with 1720 Entertainment in 2009.

== Music career ==
=== Debut album: Rissi Palmer (2007–2008) ===
In 2006, Starbucks Entertainment distributed a four-song extended play that put Palmer among the top 5 best-selling country artists on iTunes. Palmer was also featured in a 2005 CMT documentary about African-Americans and country music.

Palmer's debut album, Rissi Palmer, was released on October 23, 2007, by 1720 Entertainment. Palmer co-wrote nine of the 12 tracks. She was the featured artist on Yahoo! Music's "The New Now," which highlights talented newcomers, from October 17 through November 21, 2007. The album produced two chart singles for Palmer in "Country Girl" and "Hold On to Me," which peaked at number 54 and number 59 on the U.S. Billboard Hot Country Songs chart, respectively.

In 2008, Palmer released a new single, a cover of Jordin Sparks and Chris Brown's "No Air." The song debuted at number 58 and eventually reached number 47, becoming her first Top 50 single on the Hot Country Songs chart. It was included on a reissue of her debut self-titled album later that year.

Palmer also released a Christmas single in late 2008, "Grown Up Christmas List," before Palmer ultimately parted ways with her record label.

=== The Back Porch Sessions EP (2015) ===
On March 18, 2014, Rissi launched a Kickstarter campaign to fund the creation of her follow-up to her self-titled debut, a five-song EP entitled The Back Porch Sessions. The project was produced by Grammy Award-winning producers Shannon Sanders and Drew Ramsey, who also produced on her first album. Rissi has described the sound of this EP as "Southern Soul", a mix of country, soul, R&B, with a little gospel. The title of the project is a nod to her great-grandmother's porch in Summerville, Georgia, where Palmer says she began singing as a child. The Back Porch Sessions was released through Rissi's label, Baldilocks LLC on May 26, 2015.

The project has received positive reviews from critics. Music journalist Jewly Hight wrote: "Palmer has been describing her Back Porch Sessions EP, released in late May, as Southern soul, but there's more in the mix than a single descriptor can contain: jazz-relaxed neo-soul sensuality, streamlined country-pop song structure, down-home nostalgia, rootsy instrumental textures, honeyed melisma and a more expansive vocal palette than she's displayed in the past". The EP has been featured in publications such as Rolling Stone, People Magazine, and on Perez Hilton's popular website.

=== Revival (2019) ===
On October 22, 2019, Rissi released the full-length album Revival. The album was produced by Brian Owens, Shannon Sanders, and Palmer. The first single, "Seeds", produced by Shannon Sanders, was released on October 15, 2019, along with a video directed by Emil Gallardo. Described as a "protest song", "Seeds" was written after the murder of Michael Brown in Ferguson, MO and the video depicts images of a police shooting and an immigrant child locked in a cage. The second release was the song "Soul Message", which was featured in Rolling Stone Country's "10 Best Songs of the Week" on October 14, 2020. The third release from the album was "You Were Here (Sage's Song)", (written about a miscarriage Palmer suffered in the summer of 2019), on February 3, 2020, with an accompanying animated video.

Revival has been described as "a potent punch of soul, rootsy R&B, and back-porch country" and Rissi's most personal work to date. Kyesha Jennings from Indy Week says "At its core, Revival is eight tracks of pure inspiration for navigating love, racial tensions, self-acceptance, and, above all, perseverance."

=== Color Me Country Radio with Rissi Palmer ===
On August 30, 2020, Color Me Country Radio with Rissi Palmer debuted on Apple Music Country. The show "brings to the forefront the Black, Indigenous, and Latinx histories of country music that for too long have lived outside the spotlight and off mainstream airwaves." The bi-weekly show has featured interviews with artists such as Darius Rucker, Mickey Guyton, The War and Treaty, and Crystal Shawanda. The title of the show comes from the name of the debut album of country artist Linda Martell, the highest charting solo black woman on the Billboard Country Chart, and the first to appear on the Grand Ole Opry in 1969.

As an offshoot of the show, Rissi established the Color Me Country Artist Grant Fund as a partnership with Apple Music Country Host Kelly McCartney's Rainey Day Fund "to support the underrepresented voices of BIPOC artists in country music". The grant will provide a micro-grant fund with cash gifts of up to $1,000. The fund was established on December 18, 2020, and One-hundred percent of the fund goes to artist grants.

In 2023, she was profiled in an episode of the PBS series American Masters entitled "In the Making". Her leadership of a Color Me Country day at a music festival in England was highlighted.

In 2024, Palmer's self-titled debut album was remastered and rereleased on streaming platforms, including three bonus tracks that were not originally included on the record. Her fourth extended play, Perspectives, was released on February 6, 2026, and saw Palmer incorporate more of a bluegrass sound.

== Discography ==
Studio albums

- Rissi Palmer (2007)
- Best Day Ever (2013)
- Revival (2019)
- Perspectives (2026)
