= Jordin Sparks (album) =

Studio album by Jordin Sparks
- Released: November 20, 2007
- Recorded: June–October 2007
- Studios: Battery Studios (New York, NY); Westlake Audio (Los Angeles, CA); The Underlab (Los Angeles, CA); Chalice Recording (Los Angeles, CA); Espionage Studios (Oslo, Norway); The Boat Studios (Los Angeles, CA); Rainbow Recording Studios (Omaha, NE); Sarm West Coast (Los Angeles, CA)
- Genres: Pop; R&B
- Length: 49:08
- Labels: 19; Jive; Zomba
- Producers: Klas Åhlund; Bloodshy & Avant; Cutfather; Espionage; Fernando Garibay; Jonas Jeberg; Emanuel Kiriakou; Stephen Lipson; Robbie Nevil; Stargate; The Underdogs

Jordin Sparks chronology
| Jordin Sparks (EP) (2007) | Jordin Sparks (2007) | Battlefield (2009) |

Alternative cover
- Australian, European, and digital deluxe edition cover

Singles from Jordin Sparks
- 1. "Tattoo" Released: August 27, 2007; 2. "No Air" Released: February 11, 2008; 3. "One Step at a Time" Released: June 10, 2008

Jordin Sparks is the debut studio album by American singer Jordin Sparks. It was first released on November 20, 2007, by Jive. In the United States, it debuted at number ten on the Billboard 200 with sales of 119,000 copies in the first week. It contains four top twenty singles, with "Tattoo" reaching number eight on the US Billboard Hot 100, and "No Air" reaching number three. The album has sold over 3 million copies worldwide and is her best-selling album. Sparks supported the album with the As I Am Tour and Jesse & Jordin LIVE Tour. The album was certified Platinum for sales in excess of 1,000,000 by the RIAA in the US on December 12, 2008.

== Background ==
Sparks won the sixth season of American Idol. On August 17, 2007, it was announced Sparks had signed to 19 Recordings/Jive Records/Zomba Label Group, becoming the first Idol to join the label group, the second being David Archuleta the following year. All past Idol winners and runners-up are or were signed with the RCA Label Group's J (Fantasia, Ruben Studdard), Arista (Justin Guarini, Taylor Hicks, Blake Lewis) or RCA (Kelly Clarkson, Bo Bice, Clay Aiken, Katharine McPhee, Chris Daughtry, Diana DeGarmo and idol successor David Cook) labels, with the exception of Carrie Underwood signed to Arista Nashville. Sparks has stated that she recorded some songs for the album but the bulk of the recording was done in Los Angeles after the tour was over. She said the album would be "Top 40, radio-friendly, uplifting stuff" hopefully mixing "the pop rock sound of inaugural Idol Kelly Clarkson with the R&B edge of Beyoncé".

== Release and promotion ==
Sparks confirmed on her MySpace that the official track listing as well as the release would carry bonus tracks at Wal-Mart, Sony, and the iTunes Store. An exclusive video of the photoshoot for Jordin Sparks was posted on Sparks' YouTube channel in October, where snippets of "Permanent Monday", "Overcome" and "One Step at a Time" could be heard. There are two available covers of the album, one for the US and Canada, and one for the UK and Australia, although the US and Canada cover was available in the UK and Australia (in stores and on iTunes) until "No Air" came out in those countries, in which the new cover was released. The song "Permanent Monday" was featured in the Salt Lake City audition episode on the 8th season of American Idol. The song "Young and In Love" & "This Is My Now" were featured in spirit episodes of MTV's The Hills.

=== Singles ===
- The first single released was "Tattoo", which was released to U.S. radio on August 27, 2007. The song became the album's first top ten hit, peaking at number eight on the Billboard Hot 100.
- The second single released was "No Air", a duet with Chris Brown, which reached number three on the Billboard Hot 100. On February 28, 2008 Billboard stated that "No Air" was the top digital sales gainer after selling 73,000 downloads. Both "Tattoo" and "No Air" have been certified platinum by the RIAA. "No Air" has also reached number one in both the Australian and New Zealand singles charts. "No Air" was the number one song of 2008 in New Zealand.
- The album's third single, "One Step at a Time" was released on June 10, 2008, and peaked at seventeen on the Hot 100 giving Sparks her fourth consecutive Top 20 single. She is the only American Idol contestant to have all of their first four singles become Top 20 hits.

=== Other songs ===
- "This Is My Now" was released after the victory of Sparks on American Idol. The song reached the Top 20 on the Billboard Hot 100.

== Critical reception ==
Professional ratings
Aggregate scores
| Source | Rating |
|---|---|
| Metacritic | 67/100 |
Review scores
| Source | Rating |
| AllMusic | 3/5 stars |
| Entertainment Weekly | B+ |
| Rolling Stone | 3.5/5 stars |
| Slant Magazine | 3/5 stars |
| USA Today | 3/4 stars |

Critical response to Jordin Sparks has been generally positive. At Metacritic, which assigns a rated mean out of 100 from mainstream critics, the album received a score of 67, which indicates "generally favorable reviews". In his review for Billboard, Gary Graff stated that Sparks brought "a first effort that's all over the map—and works" while sounding "like exactly what she should be singing at this age and juncture in her career." USA Today found that her debut played to Sparks' "strengths. Her clear, appealing vocals and bubbly enthusiasm are wedded to clean-cut pop songs, more mature than Disneypop but thoroughly wholesome and ultra-catchy. The usual raft of international producers combine to deliver a consistently captivating sequence of songs."

Boston Globe critic Sarah Rodman called the album a "satisfying debut". She found that "on her self-titled debut, Sparks and a cast of au courant pop producers combine that sense of sparkle, striving, and her powerful pipes for an age-appropriate, uniformly pleasant release that shouldn't disappoint those voters." Entertainment Weekly gave the album a B+ rating, saying her debut "is as much effervescent fun as any post-Idol bow" and added "Idol has crowned winners with even bigger voices, but it hasn't given us one who's any easier on the ears." Sal Cinquemani, writing for Slant Magazine, described the album as "a savvy mix of the latest pop and R&B trend [that] truly soars."

Washington Post journalist Kevin O'Donnell called Jordin Sparks "a fairly consistent disc of polished pop" that includes "more misses than hits." Kelefa Sanneh from The New York Times felt that Jordin Sparks "sounds like a mirror-image version" Britney Spears's Blackout (2007), with both projects reyling on "adventurous electronic pop". Rolling Stone critic Rob Sheffield was critical with Sparks' vocal performance on the album, writing that her "ballad voice is nowhere near as strong as it was on the show." He also noted that the "album shrewdly positions her in hip-hop-flavored R&B; which is interesting because it's one style she never touched on [Idol] (unless No Doubt counts)." Jason King from Vibe found that Jordin Sparks honors her "Wal-Martsafe image – and it reeks of generic blandness. Norway's Stargate crew produces a quarter of the album, and their synths bury the natural charisma that made Sparks a weekly Idol favorite."

== Commercial performance ==
The album debuted and peaked at number ten on the US Billboard 200 chart, with first weeks sales of more than 119,000 copies. It was certified platinum by the Recording Industry Association of America (RIAA) on December 12, 2008. By May 2011, the album had sold more than 1.0 million units domestically. In the United Kingdom, Jordin Sparks was released on April 14, 2008, but did not enter the UK Albums Chart until July 2008, where it peaked at number 17.

== Track listing ==
Jordin Sparks track listing
| No. | Title | Writer(s) | Producer(s) | Length |
|---|---|---|---|---|
| 1. | "Tattoo" | Mikkel S. Eriksen; Tor Erik Hermansen; Amanda Ghost; Ian Dench | Stargate | 3:53 |
| 2. | "One Step at a Time" | Robbie Nevil; Lauren Evans; Jonas Jeberg; Mich Hansen | Jeberg; Cutfather; Nevil | 3:26 |
| 3. | "No Air" (with Chris Brown) | Harvey Mason, Jr.; Damon Thomas; James Fauntleroy II; Erik "Bluetooth" Griggs; Steve Russell | The Underdogs; Griggs^{[a]} | 4:23 |
| 4. | "Freeze" | Jordin Sparks; Eriksen; Hermansen; Ghost; Dench | Stargate | 4:13 |
| 5. | "Shy Boy" | Christian Karlsson; Pontus Winnberg; Henrik Jonback; Klas Åhlund | Bloodshy & Avant; Andrew Wyatt^{[b]} | 3:22 |
| 6. | "Now You Tell Me" | Frankie Storm; Espen Lind; Amund Bjørklund | Espionage | 3:07 |
| 7. | "Next to You" | Lindy Robbins; Emanuel Kiriakou; Jess Cates | Kiriakou | 3:17 |
| 8. | "Just for the Record" | Johnta Austin; Eriksen; Hermansen; Lind; Bjørklund | Stargate | 3:56 |
| 9. | "Permanent Monday" | Kiriakou; Robbins; Walter Afanasieff | Kiriakou | 4:12 |
| 10. | "Young and in Love" | Karlsson; Winnberg; Jonback; Cathy Dennis | Bloodshy & Avant; Wyatt^{[b]} | 3:24 |
| 11. | "See My Side" | Karlsson; Winnberg; Åhlund; Robin Carlsson | Bloodshy & Avant; Åhlund; Wyatt^{[b]} | 3:44 |
| 12. | "God Loves Ugly" | Christa Black | Stephen Lipson | 4:15 |
| 13. | "This Is My Now" (bonus track) | Scott Krippayne; Jeff Peabody | Lipson | 3:51 |

Walmart edition
| No. | Title | Writer(s) | Producer(s) | Length |
|---|---|---|---|---|
| 13. | "Worth the Wait" | Cates; Kiriakou; Robbins; Sparks | Kiriakou | 3:37 |
| 14. | "This Is My Now" | Krippayne; Peabody | Lipson | 3:51 |

UK digital deluxe edition bonus tracks
| No. | Title | Writer(s) | Producer(s) | Length |
|---|---|---|---|---|
| 13. | "Virginia Is for Lovers" | Sparks; Eriksen; Hermansen; Ghost; Dench | Stargate | 3:25 |
| 14. | "Save Me" | Fernando Garibay; Kasia Livingston | Garibay | 3:40 |
| 15. | "No Air" (acoustic version) (with Chris Brown) | Mason, Jr.; Thomas; Fauntleroy II; Griggs; Scala; Russell | The Underdogs; Griggs^{[a]} | 4:13 |
| 16. | "This Is My Now" | Krippayne; Peabody | Lipson | 3:51 |

US digital deluxe edition and 2020 worldwide digital deluxe reissue bonus tracks
| No. | Title | Writer(s) | Producer(s) | Length |
|---|---|---|---|---|
| 13. | "Virginia Is for Lovers" | Sparks; Eriksen; Hermansen; Ghost; Dench | Stargate | 3:25 |
| 14. | "Save Me" | Garibay; Livingston | Garibay | 3:40 |
| 15. | "Worth the Wait" | Cates; Kiriakou; Robbins; Sparks | Kiriakou | 3:37 |
| 16. | "This Is My Now" | Krippayne; Peabody | Lipson | 3:51 |

Notes

- ^{^[a]} signifies co-producer(s)
- ^{^[b]} signifies additional vocal producer(s)

== Personnel ==
=== Musicians ===
- Vocals – Jordin Sparks (tracks 1–2, 4, 6–9), (Lead: 3, 5, 10–12)
- Featuring vocals by: Chris Brown (track 3) (Jive)
- Background vocals – Tracy Ackerman (track 12), Sheree Ford Brown, Cathy Dennis (10), James Fauntleroy (3), Steve Russell (3), Chau Phan (5, 11)
- Guitar – Dave Rainger, Henrik Jonback, Corky James, Andrew Hey, and Ian Dench
- Bass – Henrik Jonback, Alex Al, Emanuel Kiriakou, and Walter Afanasieff

=== Production ===
- Producers: Stargate, Jonas Jeberg, Cutfather, Robbie Nevil, The Underdogs, Erik "Bluetooth" Griggs, Bloodshy & Avant, Espionage, Emanuel Kiriakou, Klas Åhlund, Stephen Lipson
- Vocal producer: Andrew Wyatt
- Mastering: Tom Coyne
- Engineers: Mikkel S. Eriksen, Matty Green, Dabling Harward, Andrew Hey, Adam Kagen, Emanuel Kiriakou, Robert Smith, Brian Sumner, Pat Thrall, Tim Weidner and Eric Rennaker
- Assistant engineers: Jeremy Garrett, Clint Lawrence, Mike Laza, and Eric Rennaker
- Mixing: Henrik Edenhed and Serban Ghenea
- Mixing assistant: Josh Houghkirk and Nik Karpen
- A&R: Nancy Roof and Jeff Fenster
- Photography: Mary Ellen Matthews

== Charts ==
=== Weekly charts ===
Weekly chart performance for Jordin Sparks
| Chart (2007–08) | Peak position |
|---|---|
| Australian Albums (ARIA) | 17 |
| Austrian Albums (Ö3 Austria) | 41 |
| Belgian Albums (Ultratop Flanders) | 66 |
| Canadian Albums (Billboard) | 12 |
| Dutch Albums (Album Top 100) | 41 |
| German Albums (Offizielle Top 100) | 42 |
| Irish Albums (IRMA) | 19 |
| New Zealand Albums (RMNZ) | 10 |
| Scottish Albums (Official Charts) | 20 |
| Swedish Albums (Sverigetopplistan) | 57 |
| Swiss Albums (Schweizer Hitparade) | 29 |
| UK Albums (Official Charts) | 17 |
| US Billboard 200 | 10 |

=== Year-end charts ===
Year-end chart performance for Jordin Sparks
| Chart (2008) | Position |
|---|---|
| Australian Albums (ARIA) | 59 |
| US Billboard 200 | 35 |

== Certifications ==
Certifications for Jordin Sparks
| Region | Certification | Certified units/sales |
|---|---|---|
| Australia (ARIA) | Gold | 35,000^{^} |
| Canada (Music Canada) | Gold | 50,000^{^} |
| New Zealand (RMNZ) | Platinum | 15,000^{‡} |
| United Kingdom (BPI) | Gold | 100,000^{^} |
| United States (RIAA) | Platinum | 1,045,000 |
^{^} Shipments figures based on certification alone.^{‡} Sales+streaming figures based on certification alone.

== Release history ==
Release dates and formats for Jordin Sparks
| Region | Date | Format(s) | Label(s) | Ref. |
|---|---|---|---|---|
| United States | November 20, 2007 | CD; digital download | Jive | |
| Canada | November 27, 2007 | CD; digital download | Jive | |
| Australia | March 29, 2008 | CD; digital download | Sony Music | |
| New Zealand | March 29, 2008 | CD; digital download | Sony Music | |
| United Kingdom | April 14, 2008 | CD; digital download | Sony Music | |
| Brazil | April 20, 2008 | CD | Sony Music | |
| Germany | July 4, 2008 | CD; digital download | Sony Music | |
| Poland | September 1, 2008 | CD | Sony Music | |
| Italy | February 6, 2009 | CD | Sony Music | |
