= One Step at a Time (Jordin Sparks song) =

2008 single by Jordin Sparks

Single by Jordin Sparks

from the album Jordin Sparks
- Released: June 10, 2008
- Recorded: October 2007
- Studio: Westlake Audio (Los Angeles, CA)
- Genre: Pop; R&B
- Length: 3:25
- Label: Jive
- Songwriters: Robbie Nevil; Lauren Evans; Jonas Jeberg; Mich Hansen
- Producers: Jonas Jeberg; Cutfather; Robbie Nevil

Jordin Sparks singles chronology
"No Air" (2008)	"One Step at a Time" (2008)	"Battlefield" (2009)

Jordin Sparks UK singles chronology
"Tattoo" (2008)	"One Step at a Time" (2009)	"Battlefield" (2009)

Jordin Sparks European singles chronology
"Tattoo" (2008)	"One Step at a Time" (2009)	"Battlefield" (2009)

"One Step at a Time" is the third and final single from American pop/R&B singer Jordin Sparks from her self-titled debut album. Written by Robbie Nevil, Lauren Evans, Jonas Jeberg and Mich Hansen the song was released in the U.S. on June 10, 2008. Sparks performed the song on the season finale of the seventh season of American Idol. The song was received favorably by music critics, who complimented the production, lyrical message and Sparks' vocal performance.

When the song reached number seventeen on the Billboard Hot 100 (Week Ending August 27, 2008), Sparks became the first and so far only American Idol contestant ever to have their first four singles all crack the Top 20 of the Billboard Hot 100. The song peaked at number three on the Mainstream Top 40 airplay chart.

The song served as Sparks' third UK single and digitally released on January 26. It surpassed the success of previous single "Tattoo" as it was A-Listed on Radio 1's playlist on January 14, 2009. On February 1, 2009, the song reached a peak of number sixteen on the UK Singles Chart despite no physical release. The single also reached number two in New Zealand, number eleven in Canada, and number twelve in Australia.

== Background and composition ==
The lyrics for the song were written by Robbie Nevil and Lauren Evans with Jordin Sparks in mind, as the writers were familiar with her appearance on American Idol and how "she auditioned in Los Angeles but didn't make it to Hollywood Week and had the courage to audition again." When writing the song, they imagined "her heels walking on the sidewalk" and eventually the song "told Jordin's story and my story and everybody's story who pursues music", according to Evans.

"One Step at a Time" was written by Robbie Nevil, Lauren Evans, Jonas Jeberg, and Cutfather, while production was handled by Jeberg and Cutfather. According to the sheet music published at Musicnotes.com by Almo Music Corporation, the song is performed in the key of D-flat major with a tempo of 102 beats per minute. The song follows a chord progression of E♭m–D♭–B♭m–A♭, and Sparks' vocals span two octaves, from A♭_{3} to A♭_{5}.

== Critical reception ==
The song received favorable reviews from music critics. In his review of the single, Chuck Taylor at Billboard stated that "One Step at a Time" was "a beautifully blended, soulful number percolating with optimism". Entertainment Weekly, on its website, encouraged readers to download the song, as they had a "sudden epiphany that Jordin Sparks has put out three good songs in a row".

== Promotion ==
Sparks performed this song on the season 7 finale of American Idol, Live with Regis and Kelly, So You Think You Can Dance, Macy's Fourth of July Fireworks Spectacular, Good Morning America, and Canadian Idol. "One Step At A Time" was also used in advertisements for the USA TV series, The Starter Wife, starring Debra Messing.

== Chart performance ==
The song debuted at number 79 on the Billboard Hot 100 chart, and peaked at number seventeen, giving Sparks her fourth consecutive Hot 100 top twenty hit. This makes Sparks the only American Idol contestant to have her first four singles reach the top twenty of the Hot 100. The song's current digital sales in the U.S. stand at around 1,300,000.

On the Billboard Pop 100, it became her third consecutive top ten and second top five hit, reaching number five. It also became Sparks' third consecutive top twenty hit on the Canadian Hot 100 where it has peaked at number eleven. In Australia, "One Step at a Time" debuted at a promising number 78 and eventually peaked at number twelve. In New Zealand the song debuted at number 27 and peaked at number two, becoming Sparks' second consecutive top five hit there. The song was certified Gold in New Zealand on November 30, 2008, selling over 7,500 copies. On January 11, 2009, the song entered the UK Singles Chart at number 56 on downloads alone and eventually peaked at number sixteen.

== Music video ==
The music video for "One Step at a Time" was filmed the weekend of May 4, 2008 in Los Angeles, with renowned director Ray Kay.

The official music video was added on the popular video sharing site YouTube via Sparks' official channel on May 28, 2008, but was quickly removed then added back on June 5, 2008. The official video later made its official debut on Amazon.com on June 9, 2008. After the premiere, the music video was available for purchase on the iTunes Music Store. The video made its television premiere on Canada's MuchMusic on June 18, 2008.

The video revolves around Sparks in a green and white dress and green heels taking a tour around the city as other people are going through different moments. Different scenarios play out including a guy picking up his date for prom, a teenager (Corbin Bleu) teaching his little brother to skateboard, two teenagers painting a park bench, a boy and a girl selling lemonade, a young woman at her first day of college, and a group of teenagers taking care of a garden. Throughout the video, the camera pans to Sparks' as well as the other subject's feet (basically keeping with the song's title).

At the end, Sparks flashes her palm at the camera, the words, "I ♥ you WENDY" visible, apparently written in marker. Wendy was a family friend who died of melanoma. Her younger brother, PJ, also makes an appearance in the video.

== Track listing ==
1. "One Step at a Time" (Main Version) – 3:25
2. "One Step at a Time" (Grayson Remix) – 4:38
3. "One Step at a Time" (Nevin's Radio Mix) – 3:22
4. "One Step at a Time" (Rizzo Funk Generation Club Mix) – 6:47
5. "One Step at a Time" (Tonal Remix) – 4:44

== Personnel ==
- Songwriting – Robbie Nevil, Lauren Evans, Jonas Jeberg, Mich Hansen
- Production – Jonas Jeberg, Cutfather, Robbie Nevil
- Recording, keyboards and programming – Jonas Jeberg
- Vocal recording – Robbie Nevil
- Vocal engineering – Adam Kagen
- Assistant vocal engineering – Eric Rennaker
- Backing vocals – Lauren Evans
- Percussion – Mich Hansen
- Mixing – Manny Marroquin
- Assistant mixing – Jared Robbins

== Charts ==
=== Charts ===
Chart (2008–2009)	Peak position
Australia (ARIA)	12
Canada Hot 100 (Billboard)	11
Canada AC (Billboard)	43
Canada CHR/Top 40 (Billboard)	5
Canada Hot AC (Billboard)	5
Czech Republic Airplay (ČNS IFPI)	59
European Hot 100 Singles (Billboard)	54
Germany (GfK)	55
Ireland (IRMA)	42
New Zealand (Recorded Music NZ)	2
Slovakia Airplay (ČNS IFPI)	44
Sweden (Sverigetopplistan)	53
UK Singles (Official Charts)	16
US Billboard Hot 100	17
US Adult Contemporary (Billboard)	13
US Adult Pop Airplay (Billboard)	14
US Pop Airplay (Billboard)	3
US Rhythmic Airplay (Billboard)	39

=== Year-end charts ===
Chart (2008)	position
Australia (ARIA)	78
Canada (Canadian Hot 100)	38
US Billboard Hot 100	61
US Mainstream Top 40 (Billboard)	27

== Certifications ==
Region	Certification	Certified units/sales
Australia (ARIA)	Gold	35,000^{^}
New Zealand (RMNZ)	Platinum	30,000^{‡}
United Kingdom (BPI)	Silver	200,000^{‡}
^{^} Shipments figures based on certification alone.^{‡} Sales+streaming figures based on certification alone.

== Release history ==
Region	Date	Format	Label
United States	June 10, 2008	Mainstream radio	Jive Records
Australia	September 13, 2008	Digital EP	19 Recordings
France	September 13, 2008	Digital EP	19 Recordings
Germany	September 13, 2008	Digital EP	19 Recordings
Mexico	September 13, 2008	Digital EP	19 Recordings
United Kingdom	September 13, 2008	Digital EP	19 Recordings
