= Tattoo (Jordin Sparks song) =

2007 single by Jordin Sparks

Single by Jordin Sparks

from the album Jordin Sparks
- Released: August 27, 2007
- Studio: Battery Studios (New York, NY); Westlake Audio (Los Angeles, CA)
- Genre: Pop; R&B
- Length: 3:52
- Label: Jive
- Songwriters: Amanda Ghost; Ian Dench; Mikkel S. Eriksen; Tor Erik Hermansen
- Producer: Stargate

Jordin Sparks singles chronology
"This Is My Now" (2007)	"Tattoo" (2007)	"No Air" (2008)

Jordin Sparks European singles chronology
"No Air" (2008)	"Tattoo" (2008)	"One Step at a Time" (2009)

"Tattoo" is a song by American recording artist Jordin Sparks, taken from her self-titled debut album. Written by Amanda Ghost, Ian Dench and Stargate, with the latter also producing the song, "Tattoo" was released on August 27, 2007, as the lead single from the album.

"Tattoo" received mixed to positive reviews from critics, who, while praising Sparks' vocal performance and overall production quality, noted its similarities to Beyoncé's 2006 hit, "Irreplaceable", which was also co-written and produced by Stargate. The song peaked at number three in Canada, number five in Australia, and number eight in the United States. It has since been certified platinum in all three countries. The song's music video premiered on Yahoo! Music on November 2, 2007. It was directed by Matthew Rolston and features a cameo appearance from sixth season American Idol runner-up, Blake Lewis. A second music video for "Tattoo" was directed by Scott Speer and released only in European countries in September 2008, due to the song failing to make an impact on the singles charts there.

== Background and release ==
"Tattoo" was written by British songwriters Amanda Ghost, Ian Dench and Norwegian production team Stargate, with the latter also producing the track. According to Sparks, she loved the song the first time she heard it and immediately wanted to record it. In an interview with Digital Spy, she spoke of the song saying:

"Tattoo's a song that can go so many different ways. Some people think of it as a break-up song, but, for me, it's about somebody who comes into your life and really touches you - be they a friend, a family member or someone you're in a relationship with. You know, with that kind of person, you can't just erase them from your memory if things go wrong. They're stuck there like a tattoo."

Sparks also described "Tattoo" as being very "Beyoncé-ish." The song premiered on AOL on August 24, 2007. The single was sent to U.S. Top 40/Mainstream radio on September 25, 2007. Prior to this, it was released for digital download in the United States, Australia and New Zealand on August 27, 2007. An extended play featuring additional remixes of the song, was made available for download in Australia and New Zealand on March 8, 2008. "Tattoo" was released in the United Kingdom in April 2008, but failed to impact the singles chart, where it peaked at number fifty. However, due to the commercial success of "No Air" there, her record company decided to re-release "Tattoo" in the United Kingdom on October 13, 2008 with a new music video.

== Critical reception ==
"Tattoo"
A sample of the song, which has been noted for its similarities to Beyoncé's 2006 hit, "Irreplaceable", which was also co-written and produced by Stargate.

Daniel Wolfe of About.com awarded the song 3½ stars, complimenting Sparks' "powerful, bittersweet vocals" and wrote, "America’s favorite 17-year-old balladeer plays to her strengths, releasing a strong down tempo number while channeling early Mariah Carey." Nick Levine of Digital Spy awarded the song three out of five stars and said it was "a welcome reminder of why she won American Idol in the first place." Michael Slezak of Entertainment Weekly said the song had a "pretty little melody" that reminded him of Beyoncé's "Irreplaceable". This was echoed by Kelefa Sanneh of The New York Times, who said "it sounds like a cousin of Beyoncé’s "Irreplaceable". Editors from Popjustice said the song is "amazing" and felt it was a "cross between Rihanna's "Umbrella" and JoJo's "Too Little Too Late".

== Chart performance ==
In the United States, "Tattoo" entered the Billboard Hot 100 at number fifty-eight on the week dated October 13, 2007. After weeks of climbing the chart, the song reached a peak of number eight on December 29, 2007, becoming Sparks' first top ten hit. It also peaked at number five on the Pop Songs airplay chart. "Tattoo" has since been certified platinum by the Recording Industry Association of America (RIAA), and has sold 2,085,000 copies in the United States. In Australia, the song debuted on the ARIA Singles Chart at number twenty-nine and rose to its peak position of number five in its fifth week on the chart. It certified platinum by the Australian Recording Industry Association (ARIA), for shipments of 70,000 units.

"Tattoo" was a slightly greater success in Canada, where it reached number three on the Canadian Hot 100. In the United Kingdom, "Tattoo" debuted at number ninety on the UK Singles Chart on the week dated March 29, 2008. After weeks of ascending and descending the chart, the song reached its peak position of number twenty-four on November 1, 2008. In New Zealand, the song peaked at number twelve, where it spent a total of thirteen weeks on the chart.

== Music video ==
=== First music video ===
The song's music video was directed by Matthew Rolston and premiered on Yahoo Music on November 2, 2007. In the video, a guy that Sparks likes begins following her, played by model Gregory Stellatos, as she leads him to a merry go round. Sparks appears alone on the merry go round throughout the video. It also shows scenes of her and the guy on the merry go round having a good time. The video is shown in both color and black and white close face shots of Sparks intercut into it. It features a cameo appearance from Blake Lewis, the runner-up on the sixth season of American Idol, who appears briefly with Sparks on the merry go round at the end of the video.

=== Second music video ===
A European version of the music video was directed by Scott Speer and was filmed to coincide with the song's re-release in Europe, due to the lack of interest of the original. The video was released in September 2008. It features Sparks in a room with several other people, at what appears to be a college gathering. As she begins to sing, Sparks is shown with a "love" tattoo on her upper arm, as vines draw themselves down her arm. Following this, the ink begins to appear on the others and the floors of the room, creating tattoos in the process. Some of the people in the room are couples, and the tattoos seem to bring them closer. The created tattoos depict images and words, such as a heart or the words "free" and "peace." Sparks is also shown by herself in an empty room, with a mirror covering the wall throughout. During one point, Sparks self-consciously looks in the mirror, coinciding with the song lyric "when I looked in the mirror, didn't deliver." There are also recurring shots of Sparks in another room against a green wall.

== Track listing ==
Digital download

1. "Tattoo" - 3:52

Germany and UK digital download

1. "Tattoo" - 3:52
2. "Tattoo" (Jason Nevins Extended Remix) - 7:10

Australia and New Zealand digital EP

1. "Tattoo" - 3:52
2. "Tattoo" (Jason Nevins Extended Remix) - 7:10
3. "Tattoo" (Future Presidents Remix) - 5:03

== Charts ==
=== Weekly charts ===
Chart (2007–2008)	Peak position
Australia (ARIA)	5
Austria (Ö3 Austria Top 75)	45
Belgium (Ultratip Bubbling Under Flanders)	2
Canada (Canadian Hot 100)	3
Canada AC (Billboard)	18
Canada CHR/Top 40 (Billboard)	8
Canada Hot AC (Billboard)	2
Europe (European Hot 100)	28
Germany (GfK)	19
Global Dance Songs (Billboard)	36
Ireland (IRMA)	48
Netherlands (Dutch Top 40)	19
Netherlands (Single Top 100)	66
New Zealand (RIANZ)	12
Romania (Romanian Top 100)	21
Slovakia Airplay (ČNS IFPI)	25
Sweden (Sverigetopplistan)	26
UK Singles (OCC)	24
US Billboard Hot 100	8
US Adult Contemporary (Billboard)	7
US Adult Top 40 (Billboard)	12
US Mainstream Top 40 (Billboard)	5
US Rhythmic Airplay (Billboard)	39

=== Year-end charts ===
Chart (2008)	Position
Australia (ARIA)	36
Canada (Canadian Hot 100)	27
UK Singles (OCC)	112
US Billboard Hot 100	30
US Adult Contemporary (Billboard)	12
US Adult Top 40 (Billboard)	36
US Mainstream Top 40 (Billboard)	22

== Certifications ==
Region	Certification	Certified units/sales
Australia (ARIA)	Platinum	70,000^{^}
Canada (Music Canada)	Platinum	40,000^{*}
Canada (Music Canada) Ringtone	Gold	20,000^{*}
New Zealand (RMNZ)	Platinum	30,000^{‡}
United Kingdom (BPI)	Silver	200,000^{‡}
United States (RIAA)	Platinum	1,000,000^{^}
^{*} Sales figures based on certification alone.^{^} Shipments figures based on certification alone.^{‡} Sales+streaming figures based on certification alone.

== Release history ==
Release dates and formats for "Tattoo"
Region	Date	Format	Label	Ref.
United States	September 25, 2007	Contemporary hit radio	Jive	
Germany	October 17, 2008	CD single	Sony BMG	
