= No Air =

2008 song by Jordin Sparks with Chris Brown

Single by Jordin Sparks with Chris Brown

from the album Jordin Sparks
- B-side: "Save Me"
- Released: February 11, 2008
- Recorded: 2007
- Studio: The Underlab (Los Angeles); Battery (New York City)
- Genre: Pop; R&B
- Length: 4:23
- Label: 19; Jive; Zomba; Sony
- Songwriters: James Fauntleroy II; Erik "Blu2th" Griggs; Harvey Mason Jr.; Damon Thomas; Steve Russell
- Producer: The Underdogs

Jordin Sparks singles chronology
"Tattoo" (2007)	"No Air" (2008)	"One Step at a Time" (2008)

Jordin Sparks UK singles chronology
"Tattoo" (2008)	"No Air" (2008)	"Tattoo" (2008)

Jordin Sparks European singles chronology
"No Air" (2008)	"Tattoo" (2008)

Chris Brown singles chronology
"Shawty Get Loose" (2008)	"No Air" (2008)	"Get Like Me" (2008)

Music video
- "No Air" on YouTube

"No Air" is a song by American singer Jordin Sparks with Chris Brown. The song was written by James Fauntleroy II, Harvey Mason Jr., Steve Russell, Erik Griggs and Damon Thomas. It was released in the United States on February 11, 2008, and was the second single from Jordin Sparks, her first album.

"No Air" received mixed to positive reviews from critics and was commercially successful, reaching number one in both Australia and New Zealand and number three in the United States; in New Zealand, it was the most successful single of 2008. In the US, the song has sold 3,596,000 copies, making Sparks the first American Idol alumnus to reach the three million mark. The single is certified platinum or higher in eight countries.

"No Air" won "Favorite Combined Forces" at the 35th People's Choice Awards, where it was also nominated for "Favorite Pop Song". The song also earned Sparks her first Grammy nomination for Best Pop Collaboration with Vocals at the 51st Grammy Awards. Its accompanying music video directed by Chris Robinson won "Best Heartbreak Video" at the 2008 BET Pre-Awards and was also nominated for "Best Female Video" at the 2008 MTV Video Music Awards. "No Air" was covered by American band Boyce Avenue and country singer Rissi Palmer in 2008 and also on the television show Glee in 2009.

Sparks released a new version of the track with NGHTMRE on August 21, 2026.

== Composition and critical reception ==
"No Air"
A sample of the song, featuring both Sparks' and Brown's vocals during the chorus.

"No Air" is a pop and R&B song written by James Fauntleroy II, Steven Russell, Erik “Blu2th” Griggs, Harvey Mason Jr., and Damon Thomas. The song was originally written for a male singer, but after Jordin Sparks heard the song and expressed interest in the song, Mason agreed to give it to Sparks on the condition that they make it an event duet record, and suggested Chris Brown as a singing partner.

Having the chord progression of F♯-E-G♯m-B, the song is written in the key of F♯ Mixolydian. Its time signature is of common time. Both Sparks' and Brown's vocals range from the note of F♯_{3} to the note of F♯_{5}. Nick Levine of Digital Spy called the song "an R&B power ballad" and said it makes "full use of her impressive set of pipes." Bill Lamb of About.com wrote "from the kickoff of Jordin's echoey vocals it sounds like "No Air" is so light and weepy it needs special effects and production tricks to cover up the fact that there really is not much of a song here. Steve Perkins of BBC Music awarded the song five stars and said "by the time ["No Air"] hits the final stretch, the title actually seems rather prophetic, since Jordin and Chris are yodelling away at the tops of their voices to the extent that you wonder how they're concealing their need to gasp for big lung bucketfuls of precious oxygen every thirty seconds."

The song was nominated at the 2008 Teen Choice Awards, in the categories of "Choice Love Song" and "Choice Hook-Up", winning the second award. More nominations included Best Pop Collaboration with Vocals at the 51st Grammy Awards, a nomination for the "Outstanding Duo, Group or Collaboration Award" at the 40th NAACP Image Awards and a nomination for "Best Collaboration" at the 2009 MTV Australia Awards. It also garnered two nominations at the 35th People's Choice Awards for "Favorite Pop Song" and "Favorite Combined Forces", winning the second award. In 2008, Billboard ranked the song twenty-seventh on a special The 40 Biggest Duets of All Time listing.

== Chart performance ==
In the United States, "No Air" entered the Billboard Hot 100 at number ninety-five on the week dated January 19, 2008. After weeks of climbing the chart, the song reached a peak of number three, becoming Sparks' highest-charting single to date. It also became her first single to enter the Hot R&B/Hip-Hop Songs chart, where it peaked at number four. "No Air" peaked the highest on the Pop Songs airplay chart, where it reached number two. The song was certified platinum by the Recording Industry Association of America (RIAA), making Sparks the first American Idol contestant to reach the three million mark. It has sold 3,596,000 copies in the US as of April 2014.

In the United Kingdom, the song debuted at number fifty-eight on the UK Singles Chart on April 20, 2008 – for the week ending date April 26, 2008 – before dropping twenty-seven places to number eighty-five the next week. In its sixth week on the chart, "No Air" reached its peak position of number three on the chart.

It also reached number three on the Canadian Hot 100. In Australia, the song reached number one in its fifth week on the chart. It held the position for a total of four weeks before losing the position to Katy Perry's "I Kissed a Girl". The song has since been certified platinum by the Australian Recording Industry Association (ARIA) for shipments of 70,000 units. In New Zealand, "No Air" entered the Top 40 chart at number six on the week dated March 10, 2008. The following week the song peaked at number one on the week dated March 17, 2008, becoming Sparks' first number one single in that country and stayed atop the chart for seven consecutive weeks. the single was certified platinum on the week dated April 14, 2008, after only 6 weeks on the chart. The single spent 19 weeks on the chart and has since been certified double platinum by the Recording Industry Association of New Zealand (RIANZ), for shipments of 30,000 units.

== Music video ==
The song's music video was directed by Chris Robinson and shot in New York City. The video leaked online on February 20, 2008.

It begins with Sparks playing the piano in her home. Suddenly, she stops playing and makes a phone call on her cell phone, which directs her to an answering machine. The camera cuts to the phone she is presumably calling, which has been left on a counter in a steamy room. Sparks leaves a message, asking Brown to call her when he can. Her silhouetted profile is then seen on the left side against a gray background, as the song begins to play. Sparks then appears at her window drawing a heart shape on the foggy glass window, as she begins to sing the song. Brown then appears in the video wiping a foggy mirror in his bathroom, as he begins to sing his first verse. Brown's silhouetted profile is then seen entering on the right side of the gray background scene, and both their silhouetted profiles face each other. The video then cuts to Brown, who is shown putting on his jacket leaving his home, as he walks through New York City. Sparks then appears standing near the Brooklyn Bridge. She gets into her car and begins driving through the city. Meanwhile, Brown still in the daytime, arrives at Sparks' home. In a climactic sequence Brown confronts Sparks by her piano and the two passionately sing the final chorus to each other. Brown then leaves, and the video ends with their two silhouettes against the gray background, pulling away from each other. The video is also intercut with scenes of Brown singing alone in a recording studio with drums, guitars, and a piano, of which he plays and at the very end when the song's over Sparks is seen sitting on the floor in her house and kneeling her head down in sadness.

At the 2008 BET Pre-Awards, "No Air" won the award for "Best Heartbreak Video". It was also nominated for "Best Female Video" at the 2008 MTV Video Music Awards.

== Promotion and covers ==
Sparks performed "No Air" with Chris Brown during the American Idol top 8 live results show on April 10, 2008. In September 2008, Sparks traveled to Australia and performed the song on Australian Idol on September 15, 2008. After her performance, Sparks was handed her certification of platinum sales for "No Air". The song was also added to her set list of opening Alicia Keys' As I Am Tour in North America, Australia and New Zealand. Sparks also performed the song during the Jesse & Jordin LIVE Tour in the United States.

"No Air" was covered by American country singer Rissi Palmer, for her self-titled album released on October 7, 2008. Released as the first single from the re-release of the album on May 27, 2008, Palmer's rendition of the song spent 15 weeks on the Hot Country Songs charts, peaking at number 47.

Acoustic rock band Boyce Avenue also covered the song, for their Acoustic Sessions Vol. 2 EP, released on September 16, 2008. Additionally, the song was covered on the FOX television show Glee, in the episode "Throwdown". The single peaked at number fifty-two on both the ARIA Singles Chart and the UK Singles Chart, number sixty-five on the Canadian Hot 100 and the Billboard Hot 100 and also at number twenty-nine on the Irish Singles Chart.

== Track listing ==
US digital download

1. "No Air" (with Chris Brown) – 4:23
2. "Tattoo" (Acoustic) – 3:47

Germany digital download

1. "No Air" (with Chris Brown) – 4:23
2. "Save Me" – 3:38

Australia digital EP

1. "No Air" (with Chris Brown) – 4:23
2. "Save Me" – 3:38
3. "No Air" with Chris Brown (Tiesto Remix) – 7:40

== Charts ==
=== Weekly charts ===
Weekly chart performance for "No Air"
Chart (2008–2009)	Peak position
Australia (ARIA)	1
Australian Urban (ARIA)	1
Austria (Ö3 Austria Top 40)	8
Belgium (Ultratop 50 Flanders)	19
Belgium (Ultratip Bubbling Under Wallonia)	2
Canada Hot 100 (Billboard)	3
Canada AC (Billboard)	24
Canada CHR/Top 40 (Billboard)	4
Canada Hot AC (Billboard)	5
CIS Airplay (TopHit)	119
Czech Republic Airplay (ČNS IFPI)	5
Denmark (Tracklisten)	6
Europe (European Hot 100 Singles)	3
Finland (Suomen virallinen lista)	12
French Airplay (SNEP)	3
Germany (GfK)	10
Global Dance Songs (Billboard)	16
Hungary (Rádiós Top 40)	29
Ireland (IRMA)	2
Israel (Media Forest)	2
Italy (FIMI)	41
Japan (Japan Hot 100)	51
Netherlands (Dutch Top 40)	9
Netherlands (Single Top 100)	17
New Zealand (Recorded Music NZ)	1
Norway (VG-lista)	7
Romania (Romanian Top 100)	33
Russia Airplay (TopHit)	113
Scottish Singles Sales (Official Charts)	7
Slovakia Airplay (ČNS IFPI)	74
Sweden (Sverigetopplistan)	10
Switzerland (Schweizer Hitparade)	8
UK Singles (Official Charts)	3
UK Hip Hop/R&B (Official Charts)	1
US Billboard Hot 100	3
US Adult Contemporary (Billboard)	11
US Adult Pop Airplay (Billboard)	12
US Dance Club Songs (Billboard)	41
US Dance Airplay (Billboard)	25
US Hot R&B/Hip-Hop Songs (Billboard)	4
US Pop Airplay (Billboard)	2
US Rhythmic Airplay (Billboard)	4

Chart (2026)	Peak position
US Dance Airplay (Billboard) Nghtmre version	32

=== Year-end charts ===
Annual chart rankings for "No Air"
Chart (2008)	Position
Australia (ARIA)	8
Australian Urban (ARIA)	2
Austria (Ö3 Austria Top 40)	36
Brazil (Crowley)	21
Canada (Canadian Hot 100)	16
European Hot 100 Singles (Billboard)	34
Germany (Media Control GfK)	42
Hungary (Rádiós Top 40)	176
Netherlands (Dutch Top 40)	50
Netherlands (Single Top 100)	88
New Zealand (RIANZ)	1
Sweden (Sverigetopplistan)	18
Switzerland (Schweizer Hitparade)	38
UK Singles (OCC)	21
US Billboard Hot 100	6
US Adult Contemporary (Billboard)	26
US Adult Top 40 (Billboard)	37
US Hot R&B/Hip-Hop Songs (Billboard)	43
US Mainstream Top 40 (Billboard)	7
US Rhythmic Airplay (Billboard)	26

=== Decade-end charts ===
2000s chart rankings for "No Air"
Chart (2000–2009)	Position
Australia (ARIA)	37

== Certifications ==
Certifications for "No Air"
Region	Certification	Certified units/sales
Australia (ARIA)	Platinum	70,000^{^}
Canada (Music Canada)	Platinum	40,000^{*}
Canada (Music Canada) (Ringtone)	Gold	20,000^{*}
Denmark (IFPI Danmark)	Platinum	15,000^{^}
Germany (BVMI)	Gold	150,000^{‡}
New Zealand (RMNZ)	4× Platinum	120,000^{‡}
Norway (IFPI Norway)	2× Platinum	20,000^{*}
Sweden (GLF)	Gold	10,000^{^}
United Kingdom (BPI)	2× Platinum	1,200,000^{‡}
United States (RIAA)	Platinum	3,596,000
United States (RIAA) (Mastertone)	Platinum	1,000,000^{*}
^{*} Sales figures based on certification alone.^{^} Shipments figures based on certification alone.^{‡} Sales+streaming figures based on certification alone.

== Release history ==
Country	Date	Format	Label
United States	February 11, 2008	Airplay	Jive Records
United States	March 4, 2008	Digital download	Jive Records
New Zealand	May 17, 2008	Digital EP	Jive Records, Zomba Recording
Australia	May 20, 2008	Digital EP	Sony Music Entertainment
Germany	May 30, 2008	Digital download, maxi single	Sony Music Entertainment
United Kingdom	July 7, 2008	CD single	Sony Music Entertainment

== See also ==
- List of number-one singles in Australia in 2008
- List of number-one singles from the 2000s (New Zealand)
