= Jordin Sparks discography =

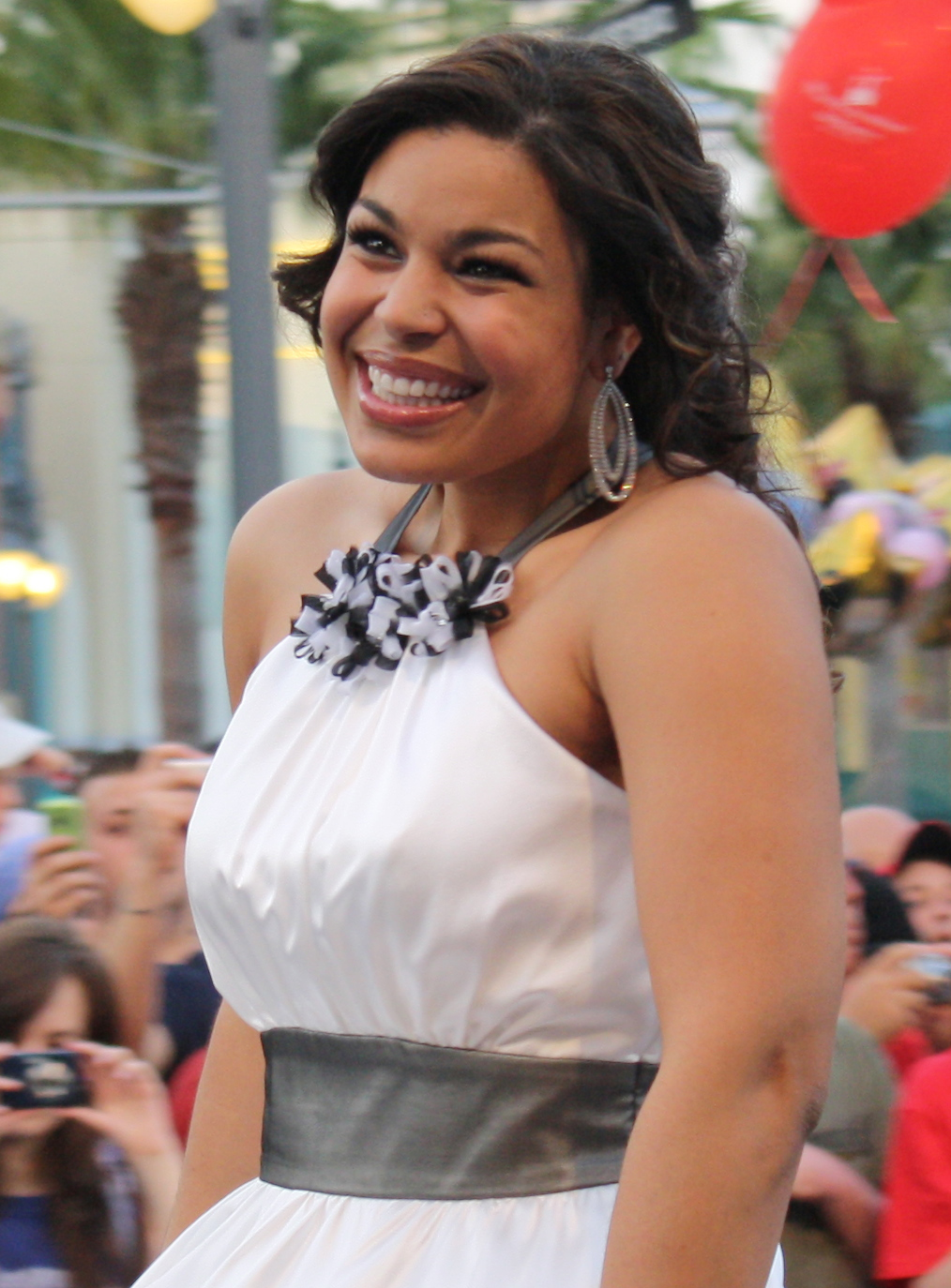
- Sparks in the American Idol Experience motorcade at Walt Disney World in 2009.
- Studio albums: 5
- Extended plays: 5
- Singles: 36
- Music videos: 18
- Soundtrack appearances: 14
- Mixtape: 1

American singer Jordin Sparks has released five studio albums, five extended plays, one mixtape, 36 singles (including two as a featured artist, 14 promotional singles and one charity single), 14 soundtrack appearances and seventeen music videos. According to Recording Industry Association of America, Sparks has sold 2.5 million digital singles and 1 million albums in the United States. At the age of 17, Sparks won the sixth season of American Idol in 2007 and earned a record deal with Jive Records. She made her chart debut with the season's coronation song, "This Is My Now", which peaked at No. 15 on the US Billboard Hot 100 chart.

Sparks' self-titled debut studio album was released in November 2007. The album debuted at No. 10 on the US Billboard 200 chart, and was eventually certified platinum by the Recording Industry Association of America (RIAA). "Tattoo" and "No Air" were released as the album's first and second singles, respectively. Both songs reached the top 10 of the Billboard Hot 100 and received platinum certifications. "One Step at a Time" was released as the third single, and became a top 20 song in multiple countries worldwide. As of November 2010, Jordin Sparks has sold two million copies worldwide.

Sparks' second studio album Battlefield was released in July 2009. The album debuted at No. 7 on the Billboard 200, and was notably unsuccessful compared to Sparks' debut, only selling 190,000 copies in the US as of July 2015. Three singles were released from the album: "Battlefield", "S.O.S. (Let the Music Play)" and "Don't Let It Go to Your Head". The title track reached the top 10 in multiple countries and received gold and platinum certifications in Australia and New Zealand. In November 2009, Sparks was featured on the Guy Sebastian single "Art of Love", which charted within the top 10 in Australia and New Zealand. Sparks' third studio album Right Here Right Now was released on August 21, 2015.

== Albums ==
=== Studio albums ===
Title	Album details	Peak chart positions										Sales	Certifications
Title	Album details	US	AUS	AUT	CAN	GER	IRE	NLD	NZ	SWE	UK	Sales	Certifications
Jordin Sparks	Released: November 20, 2007; Label: 19, Jive; Formats: CD, digital download	10	17	41	12	42	19	41	10	57	17	US: 1,045,000	RIAA: Platinum; ARIA: Gold; BPI: Gold; MC: Gold; RMNZ: Platinum
Battlefield	Released: July 17, 2009; Label: 19, Jive; Formats: CD, digital download	7	34	60	12	68	17	51	17	—	11	US: 190,000	BPI: Gold; RMNZ: Gold
Right Here Right Now	Released: August 21, 2015; Label: 19, Louder Than Life, Sony Music; Formats: CD, digital download	161	—	—	—	—	—	—	—	—	—		
Cider & Hennessy	Released: November 26, 2020; Label: Disrupt Group; Formats: Digital download	—	—	—	—	—	—	—	—	—	—		
No Restrictions	Released: September 13, 2024; Label: LBD Global Group; Formats: CD, digital download	—	—	—	—	—	—	—	—	—	—		
"—" denotes items which were not released in that country or failed to chart.

=== Mixtapes ===
Title	Album details
ByeFelicia	Released: November 25, 2014; Label: Louder Than Life, Sony Music; Format: Digital download

== Extended plays ==
Title	Details
For Now	Released: August 29, 2006; Format: CD
Jordin Sparks	Released: May 22, 2007; Label: 19 Entertainment; Format: Digital download
1990 Forever (with Elijah Blake)	Released: April 5, 2019; Label: Rkeytek, DFMedia; Formats: Digital download, streaming
Sounds Like Me	Released: August 14, 2020; Label: Disrupt Group; Formats: Digital download, streaming
The Gift of Christmas	Released: November 21, 2023; Label: Epidemic Sound; Formats: Digital download, streaming

== Singles ==
=== As lead artist ===
Title	Year	Peak chart positions										Certifications	Album
Title	Year	US	AUS	AUT	CAN	GER	IRE	NLD	NZ	SWE	UK	Certifications	Album
"This Is My Now"	2007	15	—	—	41	—	—	—	—	—	—		—N/a
"Tattoo"	2007	8	5	45	3	19	48	19	12	26	24	RIAA: Platinum; ARIA: Platinum; BPI: Silver; MC: Platinum; RMNZ: Platinum	Jordin Sparks
"No Air" (with Chris Brown)	2008	3	1	8	3	10	2	9	1	10	3	RIAA: Platinum; ARIA: Platinum; BPI: 2× Platinum; BVMI: Gold; IFPI SWE: Gold; MC: Platinum; RMNZ: 4× Platinum	Jordin Sparks
"One Step at a Time"	2008	17	12	—	11	55	42	—	2	53	16	ARIA: Gold; BPI: Silver; RMNZ: Platinum	Jordin Sparks
"Battlefield"	2009	10	4	47	5	40	9	15	3	39	11	ARIA: Platinum; BPI: Gold; RMNZ: Gold	Battlefield
"S.O.S. (Let the Music Play)"	2009	— (Note: "S.O.S. (Let the Music Play)" did not enter the Billboard Hot 100, but peaked at No. 21 on the Bubbling Under Hot 100 Singles chart.)	54	—	46	—	36	15	—	7	13		Battlefield
"Don't Let It Go to Your Head"	2010	—	—	—	—	—	—	—	—	—	—		Battlefield
"I Am Woman"	2011	82	—	—	—	—	—	—	—	—	—		Non-album single
"Celebrate" (with Whitney Houston)	2012	—	—	—	—	—	—	—	—	—	—		Sparkle: Original Motion Picture Soundtrack
"Double Tap" (featuring 2 Chainz)	2015	— (Note: "Double Tap" did not enter the Billboard Hot 100, but peaked at No. 25 on the R&B Songs chart.)	—	—	—	—	—	—	—	—	—		Right Here Right Now
"Unknown"	2020	—	—	—	—	—	—	—	—	—	—		Sounds Like Me
"Red Sangria"	2020	—	—	—	—	—	—	—	—	—	—		Sounds Like Me
"Pink" (with Dolly Parton, Monica, Rita Wilson, and Sara Evans)	2020	—	—	—	—	—	—	—	—	—	—		Non-album singles
"Homebody"	2020	—	—	—	—	—	—	—	—	—	—		Non-album singles
"A Baby Changes Everything" (with Matt Bloyd)	2020	—	—	—	—	—	—	—	—	—	—		Cider & Hennessy
"You Still Think of Me"	2021	—	—	—	—	—	—	—	—	—	—		Non-album single
"Love Me Like I Am" (with For King & Country) (Note: For King & Country and Sparks' new version of "Love Me Like I Am" was released as a standalone single. For King & Country released the original version of the song on What Are We Waiting For? (2022).)	2022	— (Note: "Love Me Like I Am" did not enter the Billboard Hot 100 chart, but peaked at number 38 on the Digital Song Sales chart.)	—	—	—	—	—	—	—	—	—		What Are We Waiting For?
"Call My Name"	2023	—	—	—	—	—	—	—	—	—	—		No Restrictions
"Remember"	2024	—	—	—	—	—	—	—	—	—	—		No Restrictions
"More Than Enough"	2024	—	—	—	—	—	—	—	—	—	—		No Restrictions
"S-N-O-W"	2024	—	—	—	—	—	—	—	—	—	—		Grown Up Holiday
"Safe to Me"	2025	—	—	—	—	—	—	—	—	—	—		Non-album single
"Change" (with Eric Benét & Autumn Paige)	2025	—	—	—	—	—	—	—	—	—	—		The Co-Star
"Who Cares?"	2025	—	—	—	—	—	—	—	—	—	—		Non-album singles
"Secret Santa"	2025	—	—	—	—	—	—	—	—	—	—		Non-album singles
"—" denotes items which were not released in that country or failed to chart.

=== As featured artist ===
Title	Year	Peak chart positions					Certifications	Album
Title	Year	AUS	NZ	US Christ	US Gospel	US Gospel Air	Certifications	Album
"Art of Love" (Guy Sebastian featuring Jordin Sparks)	2009	8	7	—	—	—	ARIA: 2× Platinum; RMNZ: Platinum	Like It Like That
"Is This Love" (Alex Gaudino featuring Jordin Sparks)	2013	—	—	—	—	—		Doctor Love
"Constant" (Maverick City Music and Dante Bowe featuring Jordin Sparks, Anthony Gargiula, and Chandler Moore)	2024	—	—	10	1	1		Love Made a Way (EP)
"Diamond (I See the Glory)" (Maverick City Music and Dante Bowe featuring Jordin Sparks and Mara Justine)	2025	—	—	—	15	—		Love Made a Way (EP)
"—" denotes items which were not released in that country or failed to chart.

=== Promotional singles ===
Title	Year	Peak chart positions	Album
Title	Year	US R&B/ HH Airplay	Album
"Permanent Monday"	2007	—	Jordin Sparks
"The Star Spangled Banner (The National Anthem)"	2008	—	—N/a
"Vertigo"	2009	—	Battlefield
"The World I Knew"	2011	—	—N/a
"Angels Are Singing"	2011	—	—N/a
"Skipping a Beat"	2013	—	—N/a
"11:11"	2013	—	Right Here Right Now
"I Wish We'd All Been Ready"	2014	—	—N/a
"How Bout Now (Remix)"	2014	43	#ByeFelicia
"It Ain't You"	2014	—	Right Here Right Now
"100 Years"	2015	—	Right Here Right Now
"Work from Home" (featuring B.o.B)	2015	—	Right Here Right Now
"Boyz In The Hood"	2015	—	Right Here Right Now
"0To60" (with Brady Rhymer & Dough E. Fresh)	2016	—	—N/a
"Real Love" (with Elijah Blake)	2019	—	—N/a
"—" denotes items which failed to chart.

=== Charity singles ===
Title	Year	Peak chart positions							Notes
Title	Year	US	AUS	CAN	IRE	NZ	SWE	UK	Notes
"We Are the World 25 for Haiti" (with Artists for Haiti)	2010	2	18	8	9	8	5	50	To raise funds for the 2010 Haiti earthquake

== Other charted songs ==
Title	Year	Peak chart positions		Album
Title	Year	US	US Gospel	Album
"A Broken Wing"	2007	66	—	Jordin Sparks
"I (Who Have Nothing)"	2007	80	—	Jordin Sparks
"One Wing"	2012	—	2	Sparkle: Original Motion Picture Soundtrack
"—" denotes items which failed to chart.

== Other appearances ==
=== Album appearances ===
Title	Year	Other artist(s)	Album
"Count on You"	2010	Big Time Rush	BTR
"You Gotta Want It"	2011	—N/a	Official Gameday Music of the NFL
"Chocolate Brown Eyes"	2013	Salaam Remi	One in the Chamber
"Vertigo"	2013	Jason Derulo	Tattoos
"Vertigo"	2014	Jason Derulo	Talk Dirty
"Playing With Fire"	2015	Thomas Rhett	Tangled Up
"Too Late for Love"	2016	DJ Antoine	Provocateur
"Water Guns"	2016	Todrick Hall	Straight Outta Oz
"Chasing"	2017	Danny Gokey	Rise
"Hey Love"	2018	Michael W. Smith	A Million Lights
"Radiating"	2020	Keith Harris	The Keith Harris Experience: Volume: 1
"Solid Gold"	2020	Keith Harris	The Keith Harris Experience: Volume: 1
"Akin Ka Na Lang"	2023	Troy Laureta	Dalamhati: A Troy Laureta OPM Collective, Vol. 3
"Giant"	2023	Dame Dolla & Ty Dolla Sign	Don D.O.L.L.A.
"Damn, If He Didn't Love Me"	2024	Tiera Kennedy	Rooted

=== Soundtrack appearances ===
Title	Year	Other artist(s)	Film
"I'll Be Home for Christmas"	2007	None	This Christmas
"Road to Paradise"	2009	None	Tinker Bell and the Lost Treasure
"If You Dream"	2009	Tyrese, Toni Braxton, Omarion, Faith Evans, JoJo, Charlie Wilson, Tamar Braxton & Steve Russell	More Than a Game
"Reflection"	2010	None	Secrets of the Mountain
"Beauty and the Beast"	2010	None	Beauty and the Beast
"The World I Knew"	2011	None	African Cats
"Angels Are Singing"	2011	None	12 Dates of Christmas
"Jump"	2012	Carmen Ejogo & Tika Sumpter	Sparkle
"Hooked on Your Love"	2012	Carmen Ejogo & Tika Sumpter	Sparkle
"Something He Can Feel"	2012	Carmen Ejogo & Tika Sumpter	Sparkle
"Look Into Your Heart"	2012	None	Sparkle
"One Wing"	2012	None	Sparkle
"Love Will"	2012	None	Sparkle
"Christmas Time to Me"	2013	None	The Best Man Holiday
"New Star in The Sky"	2022	None	Rugrats
"Friendship Sold Separately"	2022	Tori Kelly	Rugrats
"Glittering"	2024	None	Barbie Mysteries: The Great Horse Chase

=== Songwriting & performance credits ===
Title	Year	Artist(s)	Album	Ref
"Skyscraper" (Demo + Backing Vocals)	2011	Demi Lovato	Unbroken	
"The Way"	2013	Ariana Grande (featuring Mac Miller)	Yours Truly	
"A Moment"	2020	Amber Riley	RILEY	
"Forty One Winks"	2024	Tomorrow X Together	The Star Chapter: Sanctuary	

== Music videos ==
List of music videos, showing year released and directors
Title	Year	Other artist(s)	Director(s)	Ref.
As lead artist
"Tattoo"	2007	None	Matthew Rolston	
"No Air"	2008	Chris Brown	Chris Robinson	
"One Step at a Time"	2008	None	Ray Kay	
"Tattoo" (Second version)	2008	None	Scott Speer	
"Battlefield"	2009	None	Philip Andelman	
"S.O.S. (Let the Music Play)"	2009	None	Chris Robinson	
"Beauty and the Beast"	2010	None	Philip Andelman	
"The World I Knew"	2011	None	Christopher Alender	
"Celebrate"	2012	Whitney Houston	Marcus Raboy	
"This Is My Wish"	2013	None	Marius Crowne	
"Double Tap"	2015	2 Chainz	DAPS	
"Right Here, Right Now"	2015	None	Mike Ho	
"They Don't Give"	2015	None	Mike Ho	
"Red Sangria"	2020	None	Jordin Sparks & Jamal Josef	
"A Baby Changes Everything"	2020	Matt Bloyd	Ace & Don Barro	
"You Still Think Of Me"	2021	None	Sean Alexander	
"Deux"	2023	Elijah Blake	Sean Alexander	
"Call My Name"	2023	Jordin Sparks	Alfredo Flores	
As featured artist
"Art of Love"	2009	Guy Sebastian	TWiN	
"Water Guns"	2016	Todrick Hall	Todrick Hall	
Guest appearances
"Little Drummer Boy"	2009	Steph Jones	Valerie Babayan	
"We Are the World 25 for Haiti"	2010	Artists for Haiti	Paul Haggis	
"Marry Me"	2013	Jason Derulo	Hannah Lux Davis	
