= For Now =

For Now may refer to:

- For Now (album), a 2018 album by DMA's
- For Now (EP), an EP by Jordin Sparks
- For Now (song), a song by Pink
