= Bye Felicia =

Bye Felicia may refer to:

- "Bye, Felicia", a two-word phrase originally from the 1995 film Friday
- #ByeFelicia, a 2014 mixtape by American singer Jordin Sparks
