= Skipping a Beat =

Promotional single by Jordin Sparks
- Released: August 13, 2013
- Recorded: 2013
- Genre: R&B; pop
- Length: 3:38
- Label: RCA
- Songwriters: Cainon Lamb; Rebecca Johnson; Taurian Osbourne
- Producer: Lamb

"Skipping a Beat" is a song recorded by American recording artist Jordin Sparks. The mid tempo R&B/pop track was written by Cainon Lamb, Rebecca Johnson & Taurian Osbourne, while the song's production was provided by Lamb. "Skipping a Beat" premiered online via Sparks' official SoundCloud page on August 1, 2013. It was released as a buzz single in promotion of her upcoming third studio album, Right Here, Right Now (2015), and was ultimately not included on the final track listing of the album. The song was made available for digital download to all digital retailers in the United States on August 13, 2013 through RCA Records.

== Background and release ==
On July 22 and 23, 2013, Sparks announced the release of a single via her official Twitter account with the hashtags #10DaysBeforeItBreaks and #9DaysBeforeMagic along with six-second snippets of the songs. This led to speculation of two singles titled "Before It Breaks" and "Magic" being released on August 1, 2013, with Sparks further previewing a snippet of a song with the hashtag #7DaysBeforeItSkips in the days leading up to the specified date. Instead, "Skipping a Beat" premiered online via Sparks' official SoundCloud page on August 1, 2013. The song was made available for download via digital retailers worldwide on August 12, 2013, and a day later in the United States on August 13, 2013.

In an interview, Jordin opined that "Skipping a Beat" was "older, but fun and happy and sexy at the same time." The single was touted as a buzz single and "taste for the new direction" Sparks' third album would be heading toward, as well as a prelude to the release of the album's planned first single "Before It Breaks", which was to feature American R&B singer Jason Derulo. The duet was awaiting an official release date while her label "figure out the budget stuff" for a music video to be shot, but its release was later cancelled.

== Composition ==
"Skipping a Beat" is a midtempo R&B and pop song that has a duration of three minutes and thirty-eight seconds. It was written by Cainon Lamb, Rebecca Johnson and Taurian Osbourne, while the song's production was provided by Lamb. A writer from MTV described the track as a "vaguely old-school '90s R&B track" that features "ultra-romantic lyrics" over a "catchy humming hook".

Lyrically, Sparks plays with music metaphors throughout, comparing switching up the tune on a song to falling in love. The song is a confession on Sparks' behalf, admitting a special love for admittedly her boyfriend Jason Derulo and her strong feelings towards him that causes her heart to start skipping beats, while hoping for more in the future. The first verse introduces the concept of the song: "You make my heart skip like we're playing hopscotch/Hope I'm the one that you wanna put the rock on/Hey, hey, you make it stutter/Hey, hey, think I love ya/Boy I think I'm gonna need an ambulance/Cause you been doing my heart some damage/But I like it, oh you're so exciting."

== Critical reception ==
Following its release, "Skipping a Beat" was well received by most music critics. Mike Wass of Idolator called the track "an infectious mid-tempo pop song with urban roots" comparing it to Ariana Grande's single "The Way" but "with an edge", and added that the track "seems to be an ode to her man. 'You're my lover, you're my friend, you're my gangsta,' she purrs over tinny synths and piano. It takes a couple of listens but the multitude of hooks pull you in and before you're singing along. Always the sign of a great pop song". John Geraghty of Billboard wrote "With its breezy R&B vibe, the mid-tempo song is essentially the polar opposite" of Sparks' 2011 single "I Am Woman", which was originally planned to lead her third album. Jenna Hally Rubenstein of MTV Buzzworthy called it a "vaguely old-school '90s R&B track" and called Sparks' "Battlefield" one of their favorite songs of 2009 and 2010 "so anything post-"Battlefield" is gonna have to work very hard to win our approval... While we totally appreciate the ultra-romantic lyrics and that catchy "humming" hook, we're not entirely convinced that this is Jordin's most progressive offering to date."

== Track listing ==
- Digital download
1. "Skipping a Beat" – 3:38

== Release history ==
List of release dates with formats and record labels
Country	Date	Format	Label
Australia	August 12, 2013	Digital download	Sony Music Entertainment
Belgium	August 12, 2013	Digital download	Sony Music Entertainment
Canada	August 12, 2013	Digital download	Sony Music Entertainment
Denmark	August 12, 2013	Digital download	Sony Music Entertainment
Finland	August 12, 2013	Digital download	Sony Music Entertainment
France	August 12, 2013	Digital download	Sony Music Entertainment
Germany	August 12, 2013	Digital download	Sony Music Entertainment
Ireland	August 12, 2013	Digital download	Sony Music Entertainment
Netherlands	August 12, 2013	Digital download	Sony Music Entertainment
New Zealand	August 12, 2013	Digital download	Sony Music Entertainment
Norway	August 12, 2013	Digital download	Sony Music Entertainment
Portugal	August 12, 2013	Digital download	Sony Music Entertainment
Sweden	August 12, 2013	Digital download	Sony Music Entertainment
United States	August 13, 2013	Digital download	RCA
