= ByeFelicia =

#ByeFelicia

Mixtape by Jordin Sparks
- Released: November 25, 2014
- Recorded: January–November 2014
- Genres: Pop; experimental; R&B
- Length: 25:52
- Labels: Louder Than Life; Sony Music
- Producers: DJ Mustard; LALeakers; Salaam Remi; Crada

Jordin Sparks chronology
Battlefield (2009)	#ByeFelicia (2014)	Right Here Right Now (2015)

Singles from #ByeFelicia
- 1. "It Ain't You" Released: December 2, 2014

#ByeFelicia is the first mixtape by American R&B-pop singer Jordin Sparks. The mixtape was announced in early November 2014. #ByeFelicia is the first release of a body of work since her second album, Battlefield in 2009. The mixtape was released on November 25, 2014 as a precursor for Sparks' third album Right Here Right Now (2015), and featured snippets of new songs, including some that would feature in full on Right Here Right Now.

== Background ==
The song "How Bout Now", a remix of the same song by Drake, addresses the singer's former relationship with fellow American singer Jason Derulo.

At the end of the last track "11:11 (Wish)", Sparks announces that her third studio album Right Here Right Now will be released in early 2015.

== Singles ==
"It Ain't You" was officially released independently of the mixtape. A new version of the song debuted on Sparks' Vevo channel on December 2, 2014. This version differed from the mixtape version production as well as the inclusion of some vocal additions. The song became available digital download December 16, 2014.

== Track listing ==
No.	Title	Writer(s)	Producer(s)	Length
1.	"Work from Home"	Jordin Sparks	Salaam Remi; LALeakers	4:58
2.	"It Ain't You"	Sparks; Dijon McFarlane; Mikely Adam; Tyrone William Griffin Jr.; Salaam Remi	DJ Mustard	3:23
3.	"Gasoline"	Sparks	Remi; LALeakers	1:15
4.	"Right Here, Right Now"	Sparks	Remi; LALeakers	2:17
5.	"How Bout Now (Remix)"	Sparks; Aubrey Graham	Remi; LALeakers; Boi-1da; Jordan Evans	3:25
6.	"They Don't Give"	Sparks	Remi; LALeakers	2:00
7.	"Left, Right"	Sparks	Crada	1:17
8.	"Double Tap" (featuring 2 Chainz)	Jonas Jeberg; Tauheed Epps; Victoria Monet McCants; Thomas "Tommy" Parker Lumpkins	Jonas Jeberg	4:49
9.	"11:11 (Wish)"	Sparks; Elijah Blake	Remi	2:28
Total length:				25:52
