= Crada (record producer) =

German record producer, songwriter

- Born: Christian Kalla; June 26, 1982 (age 44); Marktleuthen, Germany
- Occupations: Record producer; songwriter
- Years active: 2003–present
- Musical career
- Genres: R&B; pop; hip-hop

Christian Kalla (born June 26, 1982) known professionally as Crada, is a German producer, instrumentalist, mix engineer and songwriter from Marktleuthen, Germany. He has produced and written for artists and groups such as Drake, Conor Maynard, Tinie Tempah, Jordin Sparks, and The Lox among others.

== Career ==
=== Early life ===
Kalla began his music career as a DJ in Germany, making beats and creating remixes for various artists. He began travelling to New York City in the late 2000s, resulting in early fruitful production sessions for The Lox and Kid Cudi, and securing "Fireworks," the opening track featuring Alicia Keys from Drake's acclaimed debut album Thank Me Later.

== Discography ==
=== Executive-produced/co-written projects ===
Albums with ~ 40% Crada production/songwriting credits or more
Album	Artist	Year	Label
Am seidenen Faden	Tim Bendzko	2013	Columbia Records; Sony Music
Spiegelbild	Cassandra Steen	2014	Polydor Records; Island Records

=== Selected Crada production / songwriting credits ===
Title	Year	Artist	Album
"Hyyerr" (featuring Chip tha Ripper)	2009	Kid Cudi	Man on the Moon: The End of Day
"Get That Paper"	2009	D-Block	No Security
"Fireworks" (featuring Alicia Keys)	2010	Drake	Thank Me Later
"Uneasy"	2010	Teairra Mari	Sincerely Yours
"Diary of a Broke Nigga" (featuring Kendrick Lamar & Giddy)	2010	Jay Rock	Black Friday
"Freedom"	2011	Clare Maguire	Light After Dark
"Drowning"	2012	Conor Maynard	Contrast
"Tears Run Dry" (featuring Sway Clarke II)	2013	Tinie Tempah	Demonstration
"Super Girl"	2013	Ladies' Code	Code 01 Bad Girl
"Nicht drüber reden"	2013	Yvonne Catterfeld	Lieber so
"Donne-moi"	2013	La Fouine	Drôle de parcours
"You Saved Me from Myself"	2013	Raheem DeVaughn	A Place Called Love Land
"America"	2014	Marlon Roudette	Electric Soul
"Runaround"	2014	Marlon Roudette	Electric Soul
"Body Language"	2014	Marlon Roudette	Electric Soul
"Left....Right?"	2015	Jordin Sparks	Right Here Right Now
"What If"	2016	Bibi Bourelly	Free the Real (Pt. 1)
"Tornado"	2016	Jahméne	Unfathomable Phantasmagoria
"Unconditional"	2017	Sinéad Harnett	Chapter One

== Awards and nominations ==
Year	Ceremony	Award	Result	Ref
2019	German Music Authors' Prize	Composition Hip Hop Award	Won	
