= Ambition (fragrance) =

Perfume endorsed by Jordin Sparks

Fragrance by Jordin Sparks
- Released: November 8, 2012
- Label: CPL Aromas, Preferred Fragrance
- Predecessor: Fascinate
- Website: Official Website

Ambition is the third women's fragrance created by American pop/R&B singer, songwriter Jordin Sparks alongside CPL Aromas & Preferred Fragrance, endorsed by Jordin Sparks. The product was released exclusively to Bon-Ton Department Stores nationwide on November 8, 2012 in store and online. Ambition... was Preceded by two additional releases. her first fragrance "Because of You..." and her second fragrance "Fascinate". Each scent was followed with its own Eau De Parfum release and multiple gift sets.

== Conception ==
=== Development ===
It was announced on October 21, 2012 that Jordin Sparks would be releasing her third fragrance, titled Ambition... the following month. The fragrance was created by Sparks in mid 2012 and it was released, packaged in a clear white and gold plated spherical bottle, in the United States on November 8, 2012. Sparks' first scent Because of You... was geared toward a much younger demographic however, Ambition is said to be aimed at a more higher-end than her last scent set to be more "fresh and edgy", just like the woman who is expected to wear it. The fragrance was initially released exclusively at Bon-Ton Department Stores nationwide, at a retail price of $35 for 65ml / 2.2oz Eau de Parfum, before being released in stores around the country such as Target. According to the Bon-Ton official perfume website, Ambition.. is a "sophisticated and sensual, modern yet classic, unique yet broadly appealing." during a behind the scenes look during the promotional photo shoot for the scent, she revealed the reason behind naming the fragrance Ambition. Sparks states "I want to do it all, that's why Ambition is called what it is, because that's how I feel my life right now. I want to do everything, and I feel there is a lot of people out there like me that are just as ambitious... Right now, I feel like I can take on the world... Ambition is the perfect word for where I am in my life right now." When it came around to Sparks' creating her new scent she was more focused on what to leave out. Specifically, anything that would make her grandmother sneeze or break out in hives. "My nana is allergic to everything!... So for me, one of my big things was that I wanted my nana to smell it and not have an allergic reaction. she also notes that her mother inspired her to get into the beauty business stating "My mom used to have this pretty display with tons of perfume bottles and I’d always look at them. So I knew from a young age that I wanted to make my own fragrance one day.

=== Packaging and scent ===
The perfume is described as an "unusual mixture". The fragrance's Top Notes consists of notes of white tea, bitter orange, lemon zest. In its Heart Notes, the scent features a combination of mint, sea moss, cassis, raspberry, precious woods. The fragrance finishes in its Base Notes with Tahitian vanilla, benzoin, white musk, sandalwood. When speaking on the product Jordin said "For the bottle I wanted something that was really sleek, and I wanted something that was very easy to hold... It kind of looks like leather. I thought that was really cool."

== Promotion ==
Jordin promoted the fragrance during a product launch on December 1, 2012 at Carson's in North Riverside Park Plaza in North Riverside.

== Products ==
The Ambition... lineup includes eaux de parfum in three sets which include two sizes and body lotion plus a carry bag.

Bottle

- 2.2 fl oz Eau de Parfum Spray
- 15 ml Eau de Parfum Mini Spray

Sets
Jordin Sparks Gift Set

- 2.2 fl oz Eau de Parfum Spray
- 2.5 fl oz Body Wash
- 2.5 fl oz Body Lotion
- 10 ml Rollerball

Jordin Sparks Fragrance Set

- 2.2-oz Eau de Parfum Spray
- 0.33-oz Eau de Parfum Rollerball
- 2.5-oz Perfumed Body Lotion
- White Faux Leather Wristlet
