= Because of You... =

Perfume endorsed by Jordin Sparks

Fragrance by Jordin Sparks
- Released: October 6, 2010
- Label: Belmay Fragrances
- Successor: Fascinate
- Website: Official Website

Because of You... is a perfume endorsed by American singer, songwriter Jordin Sparks, which she created alongside Belmay Fragrances. The product was released exclusively to Dots Department Stores on October 6, 2010. Because of You... was followed by two additional releases. Fascinate was intended to be more of a daytime fragrance, and Ambition. Each scent was followed with its own Eau De Parfum release and multiple gift sets.

== Conception ==
=== Development ===
It was announced on October 3, 2010 that Jordin Sparks would release her first fragrance, titled Because of You... that same month. The fragrance was created by Sparks in early January 2010 and it was released, packaged in a pink tinted bottle, in the United States on October 6, 2010. It was exclusively released at Dots Department Stores at a special introductory price of $9.50 for the first month of its launch, before being released in stores around the country such as Target and going up to the regular price of $14.95 on November 1, 2010. According to Sparks' official perfume website, Because of You.. is a "Distinct, innovative, elegant, and subtle, that offers a long lasting sensuality." It was also described to "celebrates the renaissance of extreme femininity and power of spontaneous emotion", summing up that the fragrance reflects "unique combination of luxury, art, and modernity for timeless elegance." In a behind the scenes video, Sparks revealed the reason behind naming the fragrance Because of You.... According to her, it was an ode to her fans that have supported her through the years. By voting for her on American Idol and supporting her music because without them she would not have opportunities like creating her own fragrance. Sparks stated she wanted the product to be affordable for her fans, yet still high end quality. "When I was starting this project, I really wanted it to be affordable. I looked at some other celebrity fragrances, and they were like $80. Even now, I look at a fragrance that's $80, and I can't bring myself to spend that much." she further stated "In this economy especially, my fans deserve a high-quality, reasonably priced scent."

=== Packaging and scent ===
The perfume is described as a "fruity floriental perfume". The fragrance's Top Notes consists of notes of clementine, white imperial currant and orange blossom. In its Heart Notes, the scent features a combination of nectarine, sharry baby orchid and coral charm peony. The fragrance finishes in its Base Notes with "dry-down" of sheer musks, vanilla bean, Baltic amber and blond woods. When speaking on the product Jordin said "I wanted a very holdable bottle with a girly look that catches the eye,". The perfume will be marketed to the 16 to 30 female demographic.

== Promotion ==
Jordin held an interactive contest for her fans where fans submit a 90-second video and tell them how someone in their life helped to inspire them to reach for more. Every submission will be entered into the “Jordin Sparks and Dots Because of You Interactive Competition,” where the submission will compete for the most inspirational story! Viewers will watch the video and vote for their favorite. Jordin will select the overall winner and win the Grand Prize.

Prizes included:

- $500 Dots shopping spree with Jordin Sparks in Dallas, on January 13, 2011
- Round-trip airfare for a fan and a guest
- One night hotel stay in Dallas

Jordin made an in store appearance at dots Department Store in Dallas, Texas, on January 14, 2011, to promote Because of You with contest winner Fabiola Apollon.

== Products ==
The Because of You... lineup includes eaux de parfum in three sets which include two sizes and body lotion.

Bottle

- 2.5 fl oz.

Sets
Jordin Sparks Mini

- Perfumed Body Lotion 1.65 fl oz
- Eau de Parfum Spray 0.50 fl oz

Jordin Sparks Perfume Gift Set

- Eau de Parfum Spray 2.5 fl oz
- Perfumed Body Lotion 3.4 fl oz

== Fascinate ==
Fascinate

Fragrance by Jordin Sparks
- Released: March 2012
- Label: Belmay Fragrances
- Predecessor: Because of You...
- Successor: Ambition

Fascinate is the second perfume endorsed by American pop/R&B singer, songwriter Jordin Sparks, which she created alongside Belmay Fragrances. The product was released exclusively to Dots Department Stores in March 2012. It was revealed that Sparks would be re-releasing her first fragrance by using notes that are meant to be for more of a daytime fragrance. The scent had a limited release exclusively to Dots Department Stores in March 2012 for a price of $9.95. The product was re-released in several different sets that were included in the release of her first fragrance including body lotion, a 0.50 fl oz spray, and mini gift sets. The fragrance's bottle design was the same used for "Because of You..." however had been tinted with a blue color throughout the design.

=== Products ===
The Fascinate... lineup includes eaux de parfum in three sets which include two sizes and body lotion. which were all featured in "Because Of You..."

Bottle

- 2.5 fl oz.

Sets
Jordin Sparks Mini

- Perfumed Body Lotion 1.65 fl oz
- Eau de Parfum Spray 0.50 fl oz

Jordin Sparks Perfume Gift Set

- Eau de Parfum Spray 2.5 fl oz
- Perfumed Body Lotion 3.4 fl oz
