= No Security (D-Block album) =

Compilation album by D-Block
- Released: June 9, 2009
- Recorded: 2007–2009
- Genres: East Coast hip hop, gangsta rap
- Length: 57:01
- Labels: D-Block; E1
- Producers: Vinny "King of Beatz" Idol, Tuneheadz, Wayne Petti, Crada, Bellringer, The Twin, Jesus "Poobs" Fernandez, Scram Jones, The Minnesota Boyz, Marcus D' Tray, Pete Rock

Singles from No Security
- 1. "Get That Paper" Released: May 19, 2009; 2. "So Much Trouble " Released: October 9, 2009

No Security is a compilation album by hip hop group D-Block aka The LOX. It was released on June 9, 2009 on D-Block Records and E1 Music. The album will officially introduce many of the members that make up D-Block and will also be a minor stepping stone to the New L.O.X. Order. It debuted at #40 on the Billboard 200, selling 12,000 copies in its first week. To date the album has sold over 86,000 copies. This album contains The Lox with new D-Block artist such as Bully, Bucky, Straw, Snyp Life, Don-D, T.Y., Large Amount, A.P. and Tommy Star.

Music videos were released for the singles "Get That Paper" and "So Much Trouble". The end of the video for "So Much Trouble" features a verse from the song "From The Block".

== Track listing ==
No.	Title	Producer	Length
1.	"So Much Trouble" (Sheek Louch, Styles P & Bucky; featuring Beanie Sigel)	Vinny "King of Beatz" Idol	3:53
2.	"Thrilla" (Sheek Louch, Snyp Life, Large Amount & Tommy Stars)	Tuneheadz	3:10
3.	"Show Em" (Don D & T.Y.; featuring OJ da Juiceman)	Wayne Petti	4:27
4.	"Get That Paper" (Sheek Louch, Styles P, Jadakiss & S.I.)	Crada	3:30
5.	"Get Ya Bounce On" (Large Amount, A.P. & Bully; featuring Webstar)	Bellringer, The Twin	3:03
6.	"From the Block" (Sheek Louch, Styles P, Bully, T.Y. & Tommy Stars)	Vinny "King of Beatz" Idol	3:10
7.	"That's D-Block" (Styles P, Bucky, Straw, Large Amount, AP & Snyp Life)	Vinny "King of Beatz" Idol	5:02
8.	"Round & Round" (Large Amount, A.P., Bully & Tommy Stars)	Jesus "Poobs" Fernandez	3:04
9.	"Hello" (Sheek Louch, Large Amount, T.Y.; featuring Red Cafe)	Scram Jones	3:44
10.	"Brother's Keeper" (Sheek Louch, Jadakiss, Styles P & Bully)	The Minnesota Boyz	3:19
11.	"Hustler's Prayer" (Styles P, Bully & Straw)	Marcus D' Tray	4:00
12.	"Like That Y'all (Remix)*" (Sheek Louch, Styles P, Jadakiss, A.P., Straw & Snyp Life)	Pete Rock	16:39

Hidden Tracks
No.	Title	Producer(s)	Length
13.	"Let's Get Doe" (Sheek Louch, Styles P, Snyp Life & Bully)	---	3:30
14.	"Let 'Em Know" (Styles P, Straw & Snyp Life)	---	3:46
15.	"Bang Bang" (Sheek Louch, Styles P & Bucky)	---	3:30

== Notes ==
* Track 12 contains 3 hidden tracks which commence at 5:54, 9:31 & 13:17)
