= Right Here Right Now (Jordin Sparks album) =

Studio album by Jordin Sparks
- Released: August 21, 2015
- Recorded: January 2014 – June 2015
- Studios: Encore Recording (Burbank, CA); Glenwood Place (Burbank, CA); Instrument Zoo (Miami, FL); Larrabee (Los Angeles, CA); The Cadillac Castle (Los Angeles, CA); Big Noize (Los Angeles, CA); Paramount Recording (Los Angeles, CA); Brandon's Way (Los Angeles, CA); Blakeslee Recordings (Los Angeles, CA); NightBird (West Hollywood, CA); Platinum Sound (New York City, NY); MSR (New York City, NY); Tailored 4U Music (Brooklyn, NY); Underdog (North Hollywood, CA); NoHo (North Hollywood, CA)
- Genres: Pop; R&B
- Length: 52:07
- Labels: Louder Than Life; RAL; 19
- Producers: Salaam Remi; DJ Mustard; Crada; Jonas Jeberg; Deekay; Dem Jointz; Key Wane; D'Mile; Babyface; Trakmatic; Rochad Holiday; The Underdogs; Mike Free

Jordin Sparks chronology
#ByeFelicia (2014)	Right Here Right Now (2015)	1990 Forever (2019)

Singles from Right Here Right Now
- 1. "Double Tap" Released: March 2, 2015; 2. "Right Here Right Now" Released: July 8, 2015; 3. "They Don't Give" Released: September 2, 2015

Right Here Right Now is the third studio album by American singer Jordin Sparks. It was released on August 21, 2015, through Louder Than Life/Red Associated Labels (RAL), an imprint of Sony Music Entertainment, and 19 Recordings. Following the dissolution of her original label Jive Records in 2011, Sparks was signed to RCA Records, but after years of failed negotiations to release new material under their label, she was released from her contract in 2014 and signed with Louder Than Life/Red Associated Labels. Sparks first confirmed the announcement of the album's release in November 2014, following the release of her mixtape #ByeFelicia. Right Here Right Now marks her first studio album in over six years, since Battlefield (2009).

Sparks described Right Here Right Now as "pretty music with a bump to it", being largely influenced by 1990s R&B. The final edition of the album features a fourteen-track standard edition which was serviced to all domestic and international markets. Contributions to the album's production came from Salaam Remi, Kenneth "Babyface" Edmonds, The Underdogs, Jonas Jeberg and Dem Jointz. "Double Tap", a collaboration with rapper 2 Chainz, was released as the lead single from Right Here Right Now in March 2015, peaking at number 25 on the Billboard Rhythmic Top 40 chart in the United States. The title track was released as the second single in July, followed by "They Don't Give" as the third and final single in September. "It Ain't You" and "They Don't Give" served as promotional singles preceding the album's release.

Right Here Right Now received generally positive reviews from music critics, many of whom commended the production as well as Sparks' musical direction, believing it to be more authentic than her previous releases. While the album was a critical success, it underperformed commercially on the Billboard 200 chart in the United States, peaking only at number 161. It did, however, reach number 11 on the Billboard R&B/Hip Hop Albums chart.

== Background ==
In October 2010, in an interview, Sparks revealed she had started working on her third studio album. In November 2010, during an interview with Good Day New York, Sparks confirmed she would be recording the album in New York and Arizona. In January 2011, it was reported Sparks and John Legend were working together on songs in the studio.

On May 5, 2011, it was revealed Sparks would release a non-album single titled "I Am Woman." To support her new single, Sparks served as an opening act for the NKOTBSB summer tour. On May 12, 2011, Sparks performed "I Am Woman" on the American Idol Top 4 results show. It debuted on the US Billboard Hot 100 at number 82, with 33,000 downloads sold. It also debuted on the US Billboard Digital Songs at number 57. Sparks performed "I Am Woman" on Regis and Kelly on June 14. On August 9, 2012, Sparks stated during her interview with Billboard, she had about seven songs set so far for her third album. Sparks stated, "It's going to be different from what my fans have heard before. With (2009's) 'Battlefield' it was pop/rock and a little bit of pop/R&B, but I'm going for more of the R&B side now, so it's like R&B/pop instead of pop/R&B."

In May 2013, Sparks took to Twitter, to announce that she and RCA Records had come to an agreement regarding the release of new material. The first promotional single "Skipping a Beat" premiered on Sparks' SoundCloud page on August 1, 2013, and was made available for digital download on August 13, 2013. The album was not released until early 2014 due to timing issues with acting projects as well as placement issues within her label RCA.

== Development ==
On August 15, 2014, record producer Salaam Remi announced Sparks was a part of the 'Louder than Life' roster. In an article with Music Connection,, Remi announced he would be producing Sparks' upcoming album. During a promotional tour for Sparks' movie, Left Behind, Sparks said she was in the finishing stages of her new album. Sparks said she was no longer with RCA Records and her single was due by the end of the year, with an album release in 2015. Sparks said she and her label were currently picking the first single, first look and album name.

On October 23, 2014, Remi hosted a music showcase featuring Sparks, showcasing three songs, two of which were performed live. On November 26, 2014, Sparks followed up with an official release of "How Bout Now", which debuted on the 'LALeakers' SoundCloud page and website. Her mixtape, #ByeFelicia, was released on the following day. On the last track of the mixtape, '(11:11) Wish', Sparks stated her upcoming album would be titled 'Right Here Right Now' and it would be released in 2015.

== Record label conflict and new management ==
On October 7, 2011, RCA Music Group announced it was disbanding Jive Records along with Arista Records and J Records. With the shutdown, Sparks would release future material with RCA Records.

Due to RCA's not choosing a placement for her third album in their yearly budget, Sparks set out on other ventures of auditioning for film and television roles. Sparks landed her first major film role in the musical drama Sparkle. The film's original motion picture soundtrack included new original music from Sparks based on the film and included the single "Celebrate", a duet between Sparks and Whitney Houston.

Sparks was released from her contract from RCA records and subsequently signed to Louder than Life, where ReMi would executive-produce with Sparks. As a result of the new deal all the material Sparks' had previously recorded for her third album under RCA had subsequently been scrapped and had since begun re-recording and writing new material since January 2014. An official announcement of Sparks' signing to the new label had only been released a year later in August 2014.

== Recording and composition ==
Right Here Right Now was inspired by Sparks' life experiences over the last couple of years including issues with her previous label, her relationship and her personal growth continuing "my mom just got married, my brother had a baby, he got married – just huge milestones have been happening so I've been really inspired by all of that". Sparks cites soul legends Mariah Carey, Whitney Houston, Boyz II Men and Babyface for their influence on her sound.

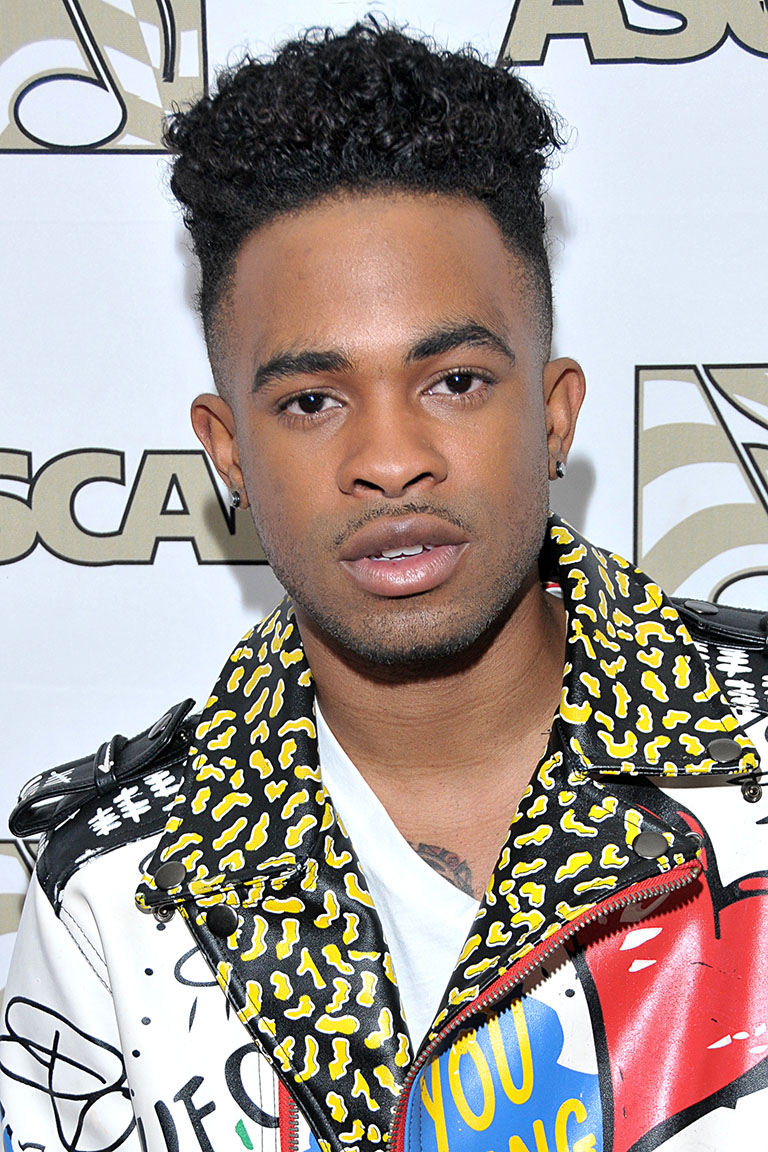
Elijah Blake features on the track "Unhappy" as well as having songwriting and vocal production credits elsewhere on the album.

The album opens with "Work From Home", an uptempo song that features American rapper B.o.B. Salaam Remi produced the "bouncy" and radio friendly beat which speaks about putting in "overtime" in a relationship with someone and "when that particular person comes home, you wanna do whatever you can to make that person happy". Sparks compares the song to Cater 2 U by Destiny's Child for its similarity in topic. Then comes "1000", which features J-Doe, an electro- R&B and saxophone driven track written by Dwayne Abernathy, Alju Jackson & J-Doe, with production handled by Dem Jointz. The song features two prominent interpolations, the first heavily samples "Moanin", by American jazz double bassist Charles Mingus, from his 1960s album Blues & Roots as well as "Ain't Worried About Nuthin'", a 2013 single by American rapper French Montana. It lyrically speaks about "a relationship where there's no strings attached" coming from the perspective of a girl. The album is named after track three, "Right Here Right Now", an uptempo R&B track written by James Fauntleroy and Dwayne Abernath which serves as the second song on the album to include production from Dem Jointz. Rap-Up described the song as a "sexy jam", whilst Idolator's Mike Wass described the song as a "club-banger". upon hearing the song's production Sparks labeled it as an "intricate" track with an "international feel".

The album continues with track four, "Double Tap" which features American rapper 2 Chainz. With production from Jonas Jeberg, who also produced Sparks' 2008 single "One Step at a Time", the song is an ode to all of the Instagram stalkers that don't show their love in the form of the likes. It's also a call to action for those people. Sparks sings "Baby, on the low / You stay on my page cause I guess I’m your favorite / But you won't let it show, no way / If you like what you see then you gotta let me know / Bet you won't double tap that hoe / Bet you won't double tap that hoe". The next song, "Boyz in the Hood" keeps the upbeat energy of the album going with its piano-led snapping production. The "infectious" jam sees Sparks take on her ideal version of the perfect bad boy, describing all different types of guys that peek her interest, "Snap backs, tattoos and a Vee neck / That's all he'll ever need to be fresh / And we rolling down the street / And them J's on his feet / And His chains all on me". Production on the album then moves on to a senual midtempo ballad, "Silhouette" .The song sees Sparks using her falsetto vocals by channeling Mariah Carey's earlier work adopting her "most agile coos". Sparks takes it to the bedroom in speaks of the descriptive and intimate moments she is sharing with her lover " There's no space between us / Tonight we'll be seamless / Painting perfect pictures of what's going on in this bed / Insatiable shadows revealed by the candles / You and me and our silhouette".

This moves onto another track called "They Don't Give" a "sultry" Babyface produced ballad that is "reminiscent of any early ’90s track that had Babyface behind the pen". Lyrically it talks about a being in a relationship and not caring what anyone from the outside has to say, even though no body else understands "They Don't Give an eff about us", They don't know anything about their love. Eighth in the album, is the adult contemporary-influenced, "Left.... Right?". Crada produced the vibey record, which centres on a conversation of a lover asking the other all these questions, expecting an answer but not getting the answer they want. "I'll find my way back to you / That's what you said before you left....right? / I was the one you'd run to / The only one that you had left....right?".

== Concept and title ==
With the release of Sparks' third album it sees her with her first urban rhythmic contemporary album. Sparks spoke on the album's musical growth and maturity siting "My last album came out when I was 19 & 19 – 25 is a big growth spurt for anyone to go through, in the time I was away I got to grow, learn & experience new things, that helped me be able to create a completed body of work that I am so proud of. The album is heavily influenced by 90's Rhythm & Blues and sees Sparks make use of her lower vocal register that aloud her to give the slower records a more urban vibe to their delivery. Sparks cites Whitney Houston and Mariah Carey as major influences on the album.

On November 24, 2014, Sparks released her first official mixtape #ByeFelicia helmed by the LA Leakers, which served as an album sampler and featured nine songs with majority of the mixtape including small snippets of tracks that would eventually appear of the full length album. Most tracks included a small interview with sparks where she spoke on some of the tracks and announced that the official title for her third album would be called "Right Here Right Now" stating "I'm coming into my own Right Here, Right Now, I'm feeling confident Right Here, Right Now & all we have is Right Here, Right Now. So I thought the title was very symbolic in a lot of ways...".

== Artwork ==
In early 2015 Sparks shot the album packaging photo shoot with LA based photographer James White. Salaam Remi had also held a previous photoshoot with Sparks for the album's lead single Double Tap with Sparks perched in front of a blackboard with a chalk drawing of the singles title. The album's final official artwork had been submitted as both the album & single cover for the title track second single. Unlike Sparks previous albums which both included a deluxe edition album with separate artwork, a standard edition of the album had been serviced to all markets. The rest of the album's photo shoot and package design had been inspired by the elements earth, water, air and fire.

== Release and promotion ==
To create buzz for Sparks' upcoming album, Sparks joined forces with the LALeakers to produce a mixtape that would be given to fans for free. The mixtape titled #ByeFelicia was released on November 25, 2014, and contained interview clips where Sparks talked about each song. At the end of the last track, "11:11", Sparks announced that some of the songs from the mixtape, as well as new tracks, would be on her upcoming third album. The same day Sparks released an album pre-order on her official website; giving fans the opportunity to have their names placed in her official album booklet.

In the weeks leading up to the album release Sparks began releasing instant gratification tracks from the album each Friday, in which she called #NewMusicFridays. Beginning on July 24, 2015, Sparks released the album track "100 Years", followed by 'They Don't Give' (a video was also released exclusively through VH1.com on August 7), 'Work From Home (ft. B.o.B)', and 'Boyz in the Hood' in the following weeks. On August 14, Sparks released an exclusive full stream of the album through VH1 and Reese's VH1First program, an entire week before the official album release. Sparks will perform on Today on August 27, 2015,.

- August 14–22 – Various fan Meet & Greets and Public Performances
- August 14 – interview on KTLA, On Air With Ryan Seacrest, and Various Radio & News Outlets
- August 18 – Interview and Performance on REVOLT Live
- August 20 – Performance on the Honda Stage at the iHeartRadio Theatre LA
- August 21 – Ebro in the Morning, Rang the NYSE Closing Bell
- August 27 – Interview on The Today Show & Performance of "They Don't Give".

=== Singles ===
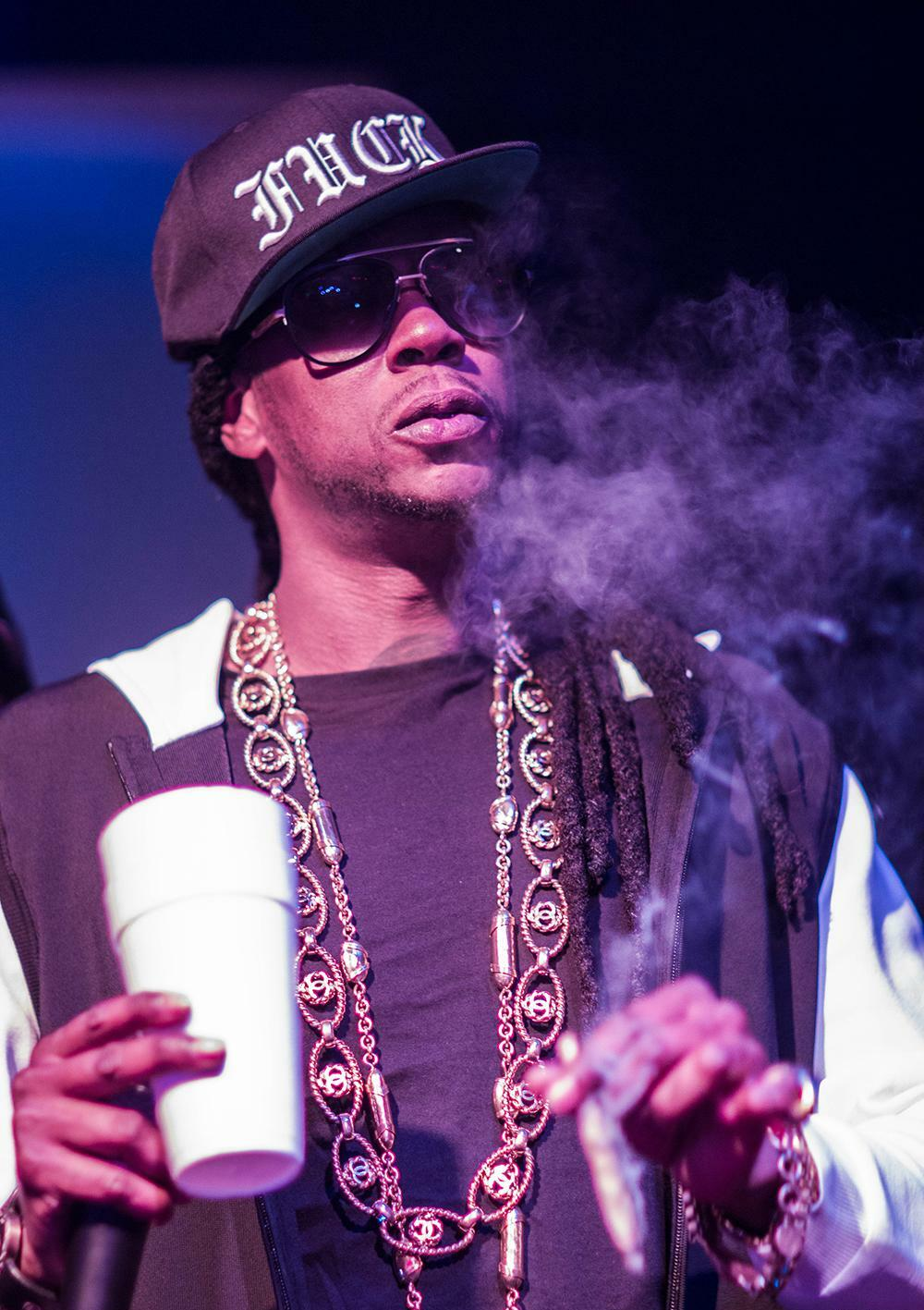
2 Chainz appears on the lead single "Double Tap" with a guest rap verse.

"It Ain't You" was the first release from the album as a promotional single. The song debuted on Sparks' mixtape, #ByeFelicia on November 25, 2014. The official version of the song then debuted on Sparks' Vevo channel on December 2, 2014. This version differed from the version on her mixtape in production as well as some vocal additions. The song became available for pre-order on the same day and was officially released on December 16, 2014.

"Double Tap", featuring 2 Chainz, was announced to be the official lead single from the album. It was originally set to be released on February 24, 2015, however it was pushed back a week to coincide with the radio release date and became available on March 3, 2015, in the United States, but in the United Kingdom it became available on March 2, 2015. It was released to Rhythmic radio in the U.S. on the same day. The music video was shot in Atlanta on February 11, 2015, and premiered on Yahoo Music on March 10, 2015. It was made available to all digital outlets the following day.

The title track, "Right Here Right Now", was released as the album's second official single on July 8, 2015. Its music video premiered on July 9, 2015, in Times Square. "They Don't Give" was serviced to Rhythmic Top 40 Radio on September 2, 2015, as the third single from the album. The song's accompanying music video was shot on June 4, 2015, at the Crescent Bay Beach, Laguna Beach in California. The video was directed by Mike Ho who also directed the video for "Right Here Right Now" and premiered on VH1 on August 10, 2015.

== Critical reception ==
Professional ratings
Review scores
Source	Rating
AllMusic	3.5/5 stars
NY Daily News	3/5 stars
Entertainment Weekly	B
Press Play OK	3/5 stars
Renowned for Sound	3.5/5 stars
Rolling Stone	3/5 stars
Stereogum	favorable

Right Here Right Now received generally favorable reviews from music critics, based on an aggregate score of 69/100 from Metacritic, Sparks highest rating. Many critics cited Right Here, Right Now as Sparks best work to date, applauding her for finally finding her sound.

NY Daily News writes "At 25, Sparks finally sounds like a woman, one in control of both her voice and her character. … The most direct role model for the project seems to be Mariah Carey's better urban records of the '90s and early 2000s. Carey fans may consider the best of "Right Here" the stuff they wished for years that Mariah would cut. ... That hybrid, and Sparks’ new maturity, allows her to find her voice, as well as a potential new role. While many fans have called Ariana Grande the new Mariah, "Right Now" makes Sparks sound like the true heir."

Entertainment Weekly said "On her third album, the Idol alum enlists 2 Chainz and B.o.B to add edge to her sultry R&B sound. But it's Shaggy's support on an island-y ode to committed relationships that pops among a mix of passionate R&B jams and take-charge lady anthems."

== Commercial performance ==
The album debuted at number 161 on the US Billboard 200, number 11 on the US Billboard R&B/Hip Hop Albums, and number 4 on the Billboard R&B albums.

== Track listing ==
No.	Title	Writer(s)	Producer(s)	Length
1.	"Work from Home" (featuring B.o.B)	Jordin Sparks; James Fauntleroy; Salaam Remi; Dwane Weir; Bobby Ray Simmons, Jr.	Key Wane; Remi	4:25
2.	"1000" (featuring J-Doe)	Dwayne Abernathy; Alju Jackson; James "J-Doe" Smith	Dem Jointz	2:37
3.	"Right Here Right Now"	Abernathy; Fauntleroy	Dem Jointz	2:47
4.	"Double Tap" (featuring 2 Chainz)	Jonas Jeberg; Tauheed Epps; Victoria Monet McCants; Thomas "Tommy" Parker Lumpkins	Jeberg	3:25
5.	"Boyz in the Hood"	Sparks; Jeberg; Marlin "Hookman" Bonds; Rickey Deleon; William Calvin Wesson	Jeberg	3:33
6.	"Silhouette"	Lars Halvor Jensen; Johannes R. Joergensen; Nikki Flores	Deekay	3:40
7.	"They Don't Give"	Sparks; Remi; Kenneth Edmonds	Babyface; Remi	3:48
8.	"Left....Right?"	Sparks; Christian Kalla; Meleni Smith	Crada	3:42
9.	"Casual Love" (featuring Shaggy)	Orville Burrell; Reina Gonzalez; Kaciny Emile; Greg "Buggyeye" Desilus; Kurtis Kingston; Dernst Emile II	D'Mile	3:56
10.	"Unhappy" (featuring Elijah Blake)	Anthony C. Williams II; Elijah Blake	Rochad "Catdaddy Ro" Holiday; Trakmatik	4:04
11.	"Tell Him That I Love Him"	The Underdogs; Dewain Whitmore; Steven Russell	The Underdogs	4:56
12.	"11:11"	Sparks; Remi; Blake	Remi	3:56
13.	"100 Years"	Sparks; Weir; Remi	Key Wane	3:57
14.	"It Ain't You"	Sparks; Dijon McFarlane; Mikely Adam; Tyrone William Griffin, Jr.; Remi	DJ Mustard; Mike Free	3:21
Total length:				52:07

== Personnel ==
Adapted from AllMusic and the album liner notes.

Recording locations

- Burbank – Glenwood Place; Encore Recording Studios
- Miami, Florida – Instrument Zoo
- Los Angeles – Larrabee Studios; The Cadillac Castle; Big Noize Studios; Paramount Recording Studio; Brandon's Way Studio; Blakeslee Recordings
- West Hollywood – NightBird Studios
- New York City – Platinum Sound Studios; MSR Studios
- Tailored 4U Music
- North Hollywood – Underdog Studios; NoHo Suite

Creativity

- Salaam Remi – executive producer
- James White – photographer
- Fatima Curry – creative direction
- GWONDERS – art direction
- Kim Lumpkin – project manager
- Jordin Sparks – executive producer
- Martin "martymar54" Medina – design
- Lysa Cooper – styling
- Rob Talty – hairstylist
- Pati Dubroff – make-up
- Tom Coyne – album mastering
- Victoria Varela – publicist

Performers

- Jordin Sparks – lead vocals
- B.o.B – featured artist (track 1 "Work From Home")
- J-Doe – featured artist (track 2 "1000")
- 2 Chainz – featured artist (track 4 "Double Tap")
- Babyface – background vocals
- Shaggy – featured artist (track 9 "Casual Love")
- Elijah Blake – featured artist (track 10 "Unhappy")

Technical

Production

- Producers – Mike Free, Babyface, Crada, D' Mile, Deekay, Rochad "Catdaddy Ro" Holiday, Jonas Jeberg, Dem Jointz, DJ Mustard, Salaam Remi, Trakmatik, The Underdogs, Key Wane
- Songwriters – Dwayne Abernathy, Mikely Adam, Elijah Blake, Marlin "Hookmn" Bonds, Kenneth Edmonds, Dernst Emile II, Kaciny Emile, Greg "Buggyeye" Desilus, James J-Doe, Tauheed Epps, Flauntleroy, Nikki Flores, Reina Gonzalez, Tyrone Williams Griffin Jr., Alja Jackson, Jonas Jeerg, Lars Halvor Jensen, Johannes R. Joergensen, Christina Kalla, Kurtis Kingston, Thomas "Tommy" Parker Lumpkins, Victoria Monet McCants, Dijon McFarlane, Salaam Remi, Shaggy, Bobby Ray Simmons Jr., Meleni Smith, Jordin Sparks, Steven Russell, The Underdogs, Dwayne Weir, William Calvin Wesson, Dewain Whitemore, Anthony C. Williams II

== Charts ==
Chart (2015)	Peak position
US Billboard 200	161
US Top R&B/Hip-Hop Albums (Billboard)	11

== Release history ==
List of release dates, showing region, formats, label, and editions.
Region	Date	Format(s)	Label	Edition(s)	Ref
Australia	August 21, 2015	CD; digital download	Louder Than Life; Sony; 19	Standard	
Canada	August 21, 2015	CD; digital download	Louder Than Life; Sony; 19	Standard	
New Zealand	August 21, 2015	CD; digital download	Louder Than Life; RAL; 19	Standard	
United States	August 21, 2015	CD; digital download	Louder Than Life; RAL; 19	Standard	
