= 12 Dates of Christmas =

2011 television film directed by James Hayman

- Film advertisement
- Written by: Janet Brownell; Blake J. Harris; Aaron Mendelsohn
- Directed by: James Hayman
- Starring: Amy Smart; Mark-Paul Gosselaar; Jayne Eastwood; Richard Fitzpatrick
- Theme music composer: Danny Lux
- Country of origin: United States
- Original language: English

Production
- Producers: Beth Miller; Salli Newman
- Running time: 90 min
- Production company: ABC Family

Original release
- Network: ABC Family
- Release: December 11, 2011

12 Dates of Christmas is a television film starring Amy Smart and Mark-Paul Gosselaar. It premiered on ABC Family on December 11, 2011 in their 25 Days of Christmas programming block. It is directed by James Hayman. The film depicts Smart as Kate, a woman insensitive to the feelings of others and who wants to return to a past relationship, and Gosselaar as Miles, a widower who hopes to find a new romantic partner. After Kate blows off her blind date with Miles on Christmas Eve, she discovers she is stuck in a time-loop, giving her 12 chances to mature, improve her relationships with others, and find romance with Miles.

== Plot ==
Kate Stanton is an advertising agent resentful about her life. Months after her mother died, her boyfriend Jack broke up with her. Now a year later, her father Mike has a new wife, Sally. On Christmas Eve, Kate plans to win back Jack, though her best friend Miyoko is concerned she is denying reality. Kate visits a department store, passing a display of a partridge in a pear tree. She is accidentally sprayed in the face with perfume, then falls and loses consciousness.

Kate then awakes to see a store manager and a man named Jim checking on her. She goes to Nick's Bar, passing by a man named Toby, where she meets architect Miles Dufine, a blind date set up by Sally. Kate is rude and leaves the date to meet Jack only to learn he has a new girlfriend Nancy. At Mike and Sally's family Christmas dinner, Sally remarks that Kate lost a chance at romance with Miles. At midnight, time rewinds.

Kate again wakes up in the department store, confused how she is experiencing the same day. Two children dressed as turtle doves run down the sidewalk. She tries harder to win over Jack, only to now learn he's planning to propose to Nancy. She meets Miles again but storms off when he mentions a wife. Sally explains he is a widower and his wife Laura died a year ago. At midnight, Kate witnesses time moving backwards, returning her to the department store.

On the third day, after seeing chefs carrying three cooked hens, Kate asks Jack about their relationship. Approaching Miles anonymously, she learns more about him. She spends the evening with her neighbor Margine Frumkin, learning how to bake.

On the fourth day, Kate finds Jack at a jewelry store where a display has four calling birds. She accepts their relationship is over. Kate meets Leigh, whose boyfriend Rich has an annual tradition of making a Christmas display for her. They spend the day together and Kate has a late night meeting with Miles. When she sees Toby again, who is consistently waiting for a blind date, Kate thinks he may be causing the time loop. She confronts him, ruining her date with Miles.

On the fifth day, Kate walks past a display case of the Five Golden Rings perfume. Rather than wait for her blind date, she spends the day with Miles. At the family dinner, Kate realizes Sally and Mike do love each other. At mass, Kate admits her deep fear of being alone.

On the sixth day, Kate wakes up and is visibly overwhelmed. Sympathizing, Jim takes her to the botanical gardens where they pass by six children wearing goose hats. The two get to know each other. Later, she misses her date in order to bake with Margine, Leigh, and Miyoko.

On the seventh day, Kate borrows lights from Rich, who is standing near seven plastic swans. This time, she asks Miles what he would like to do for their date. Miles invites her to the hockey rink where he regularly coaches the Lords, a team of children from a group home. One of the kids, Michael, ran away earlier in the day. Miles and Kate ice skate, then visit Prospect Park where she arranged a light display. The two are about to share a kiss when midnight strikes.

On the eighth day, Kate tells Jack she's moved past their relationship. Jack invites Kate for a cup of coffee at a cafe where a label shows eight maids milking. Jack reveals he had intended to propose to Kate in the past, but she changed after her mother died, becoming obsessive and narrow-focused on what her life should be like. Kate realizes she was in love with marriage more than Jack. At Christmas dinner, Kate realizes Jack never bought an engagement ring and panics, ruining her date with Miles. She later learns Jack proposed without a ring.

On the ninth day, Kate is concerned she will never have a relationship with Miles. She goes to the bar early, where nine ladies are dancing, and drinks with Toby.

On the tenth day, Kate suggests Rich use his light display to propose to Leigh. She spots young Michael, who wears his Lords hockey sweatshirt (#10). She chases him, but he leaps over a barrier and vanishes.

On the eleventh day, Kate secretly follows Michael and discovers him cuddling a dog. She reunites him with Miles and then shares an anonymous date with the architect. A delivery truck advertises an eleven-inch pizza from Pied Pipers of Pizza.

On the twelfth day, Kate walks by a display of twelve nutcrackers with drums. She helps Rich propose to Leigh, then plays matchmaker by introducing Margine to Jim and Toby to Miyoko. She invites all six to her family dinner. She briefly tells Jack she wishes him well in his new relationship, and convinces her sister's family to join the dinner. Meeting with Miles, the two quickly hit if off and then find Michael together, after which the kids from the group home also join the dinner. Impressed with Kate, Miles tells her he feels as if he's known her his whole life. The two finally share a kiss. Kate is overjoyed to see reality does not reboot at midnight.

== Cast ==
- Amy Smart as Kate Stanton
- Mark-Paul Gosselaar as Miles Dufine
- Jayne Eastwood as Margine Frumkin
- Peter MacNeill as Mike Stanton
- Mary Long as Sally
- Richard Fitzpatrick as Jim
- Benjamin Ayres as Jack Evans
- Jennifer Kydd as Nancy
- Martin Roach as Dr. Kirschner
- Joe MacLeod as Toby
- Laura Miyata as Miyoko
- Stephan James as Michael
- Cherisse Woonsam as Leigh
- Paul Beer as Rich

== Music and theme song ==
"Angels Are Singing" is a song performed by American recording artist Jordin Sparks, and serves as the theme song of 12 Dates of Christmas. It was released as a digital download on November 27, 2011 on iTunes and Amazon.com.

== Critical reception ==
In Us Weekly, John Griffiths wrote, "This holiday romance steals a page from Groundhog Day and runs with it.... It's a sweet, wacky... and nicely woven journey, with the endearing Smart adding an extra twinkle."

On Common Sense Media, Emily Ashby said, "... 12 Dates of Christmas works in a sappy-sweet, opposites-attract love plot that just happens to take place on Christmas Eve. This holiday tie-in bolsters what's otherwise a lukewarm story marked by a handful of funny moments and the requisite romantic ones. There's little that's remarkable about the story itself, but that doesn't mean the mostly predictable ending won't leave you feeling warm and fuzzy nonetheless."

== See also ==
- List of films featuring time loops
- List of Christmas films
