= Jordin Sparks =

American singer and actress (born 1989)

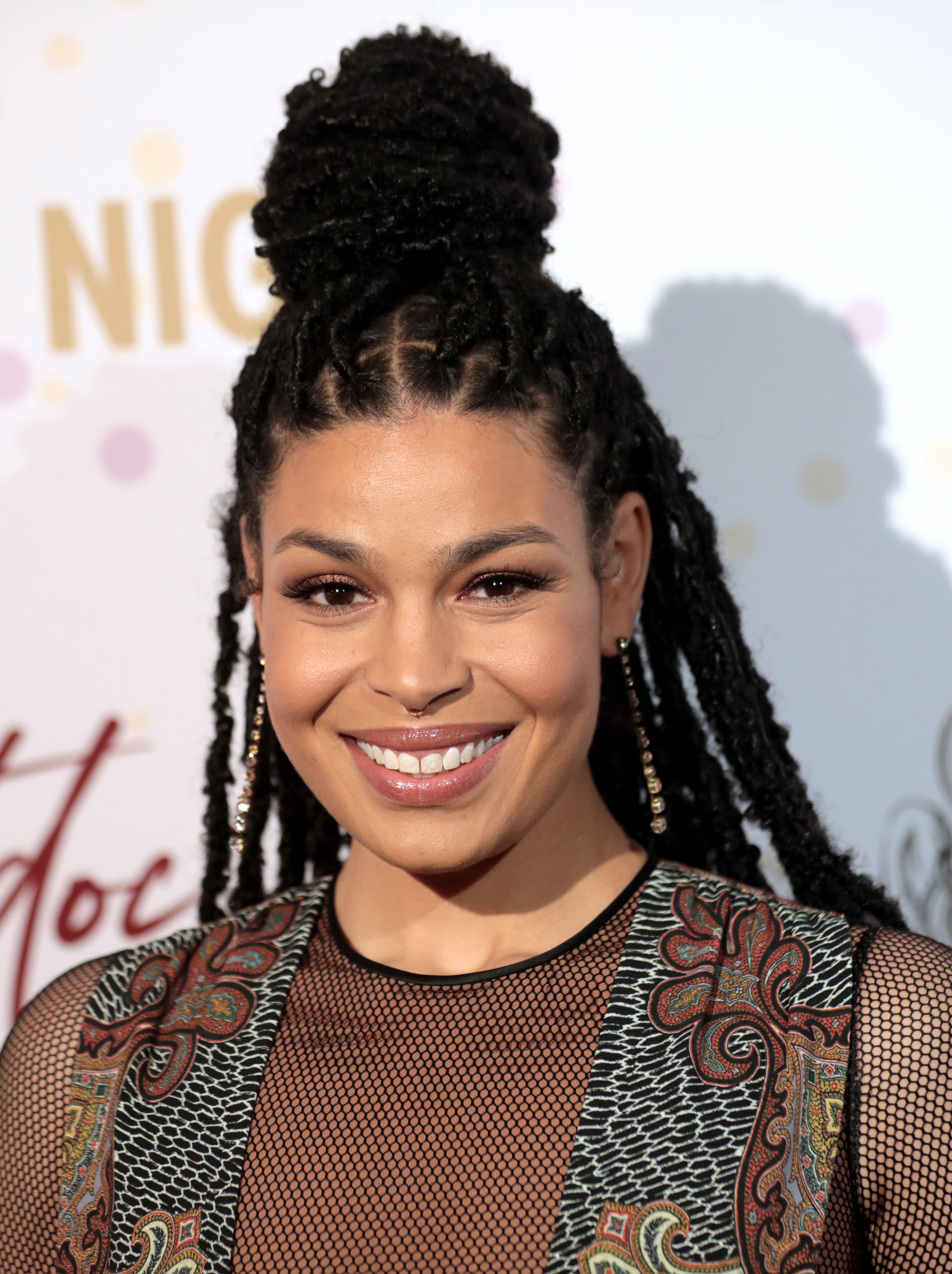
- Sparks in 2022

Background information
- Born: Jordin Brianna Sparks; December 22, 1989 (age 36); Phoenix, Arizona, U.S.
- Genres: Pop; R&B
- Occupations: Singer; actress
- Years active: 2006–present
- Labels: Venice Music; Sony; Louder than Life; 19; Jive
- Spouse: Dana Isaiah (m. 2017)
- Website: jordinsparks.com

Jordin Brianna Sparks Smith (born December 22, 1989) is an American singer and actress. She rose to fame in 2007 after winning the sixth season of American Idol at age 17, becoming the youngest winner in the series' history. Her 2007 self-titled debut studio album was met with critical and commercial success; it peaked at number ten on the Billboard 200, received platinum by the Recording Industry Association of America (RIAA) and sold over two million copies worldwide. The album was supported by the Billboard Hot 100-top ten singles "Tattoo" and "No Air" (with Chris Brown)—the latter received a Grammy Award nomination for Best Pop Collaboration with Vocals and remains the third highest-selling song by an American Idol contestant—with three million digital copies sold in the United States.

Sparks's second studio album, Battlefield (2009) debuted at number seven on the Billboard 200. Its lead single of the same name reached number ten on the Billboard Hot 100 and made Sparks the only American Idol contestant to have their first five singles peak within the top 20 of the chart. After a five-year absence from music, she signed with Salaam Remi's record label Louder Than Life, an imprint of Sony Music to release her debut mixtape, #ByeFelicia (2014). Her third studio album, Right Here Right Now (2015), was met with continued critical praise despite a steep commercial decline. Sparks' fourth album Cider & Hennessy was released in 2020. Her fifth, No Restrictions, followed in 2024.

Throughout her career, Sparks has received numerous accolades, including an NAACP Image Award, a BET Award, an American Music Award, a People's Choice Award and two Teen Choice Awards. In 2009, Billboard magazine ranked her as the 91st Artist of the 2000s Decade. In 2012, Sparks was ranked at number 92 on VH1's list of the "100 Greatest Women in Music". As of February 2012, she had sold 1.3 million albums and 10.2 million singles in the United States alone, making her one of the most successful American Idol contestants of all time. Following the release of Battlefield, Sparks ventured into acting, pursuing television and Broadway. She made her stage debut as Nina Rosario in the musical In The Heights (2010), and her feature film debut as the titular character in Sparkle (2012). Sparks has also released several perfumes, including Because of You... in 2010 as well as Fascinate and Ambition in 2012.

== Early life ==
Sparks was born in Phoenix, Arizona, to Jodi Wiedmann Sparks and former professional American football player Phillippi Sparks. Jordin has a younger brother, Phillippi "PJ" Sparks Jr., who played football at Arizona Christian University. Her father is African American and her mother is of European descent, specifically German, English, Scottish, and Norwegian. She grew up in the suburbs of Ridgewood, New Jersey, while her father played as a defensive back for the New York Giants. After living in New Jersey, Sparks attended Northwest Community Christian School in Phoenix through the eighth grade. Sparks attended Sandra Day O'Connor High School until 2006 when she was homeschooled by her grandmother, Pam Wiedmann, to better concentrate on her singing. Sparks is an evangelical Christian and attended Calvary Community Church in Phoenix. On her American Idol biography, she thanked her parents, grandparents, and God for her win. She won an award for best young artist of the year in Arizona three years in a row.

== Career ==
=== 2006: Career beginnings and American Idol ===
Before appearing on American Idol, Sparks participated in and won such talent competitions as Coca-Cola's Rising Star, the Gospel Music Association Academy's Overall Spotlight Award, America's Most Talented Kids, Colgate Country Showdown, and the 2006 Drug Free AZ Superstar Search. From the time Jordin was nine years old until her win as American Idol 2007, her maternal grandmother, Pam Wiedmann, managed her. Prior to Idol, Sparks frequently performed the national anthem at various local sporting events, notably for the Phoenix Suns, Arizona Cardinals, and Arizona Diamondbacks. Sparks also appeared with Alice Cooper in his 2004 Christmas show and toured with Christian contemporary singer Michael W. Smith in 2006. In 2006, Sparks was one of six winners of the Phoenix Torrid search for the "Next Plus Size Model". She was flown to California, where she was featured in Torrid ads and promotional pieces. A full-page ad for Torrid featuring Sparks ran in the December 2006 issue of Seventeen magazine.

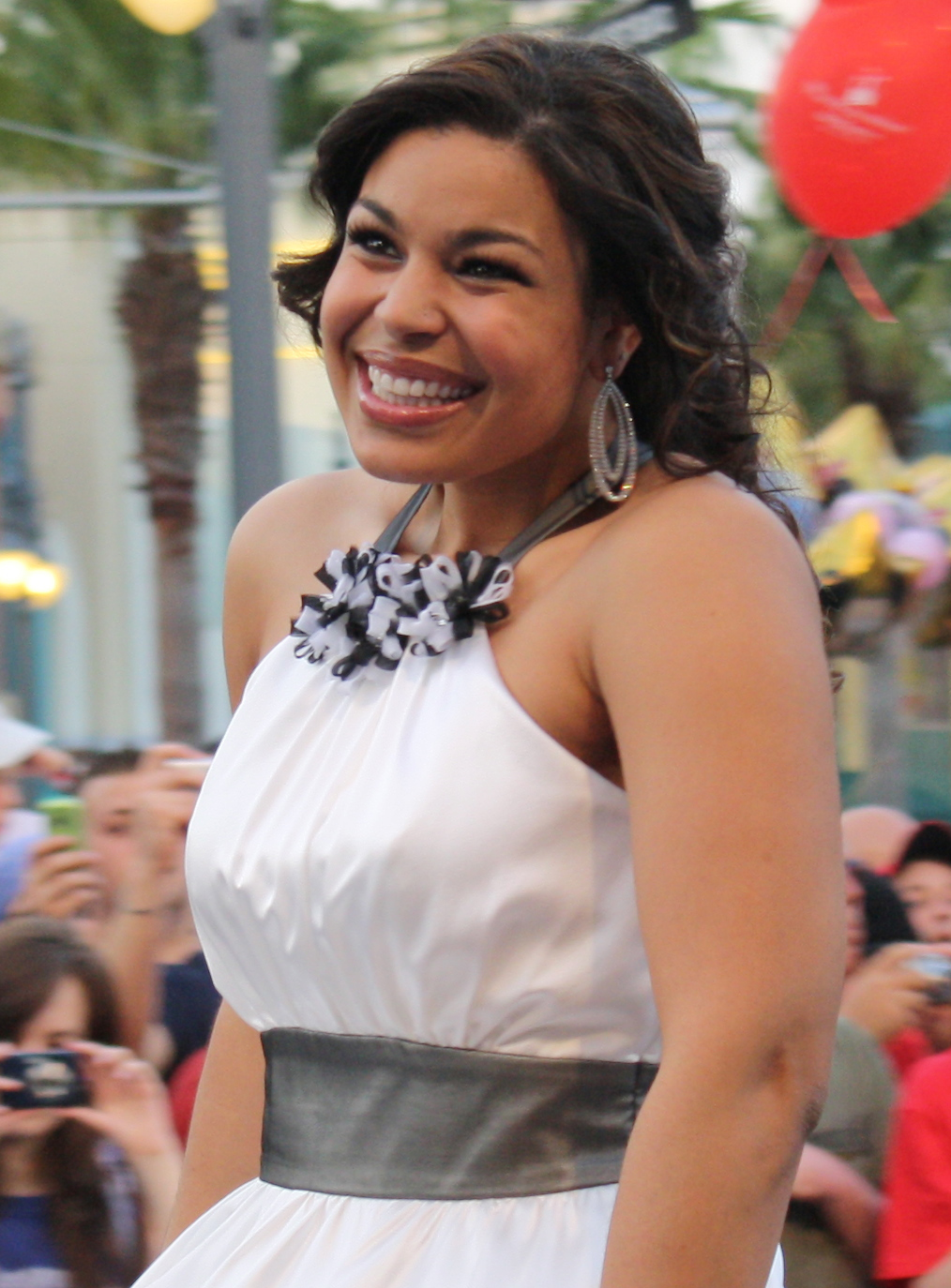
Sparks in the American Idol Experience motorcade at Walt Disney World in 2009

In the summer of 2006, at the age of 16, Sparks auditioned twice for the sixth season of American Idol: once in Los Angeles but failed to make it past the first round; and again in Seattle after winning Arizona Idol, a talent competition conducted by Phoenix Fox station KSAZ-TV. The Seattle audition is the one seen in the January 17, 2007, broadcast of American Idol, in which she earned a "gold ticket" and the right to appear in the Hollywood Round. American Idol judge Randy Jackson made the offhand prediction that "Curly hair will win this year." While on the show, Sparks gained a loyal fan base known as "Sparkplugs". On May 23, 2007, at the age of 17, Sparks won the sixth season of American Idol. She remains the youngest winner in American Idol history. Cowell said, "Jordin was the most improved over the whole season – didn't start the best, but midway through this was the girl who suddenly got momentum." He included that "Young girl, likeable, and the singer won over the entertainer [Lewis]." Four selected songs Sparks had performed on American Idol, including the season's coronation song, "This Is My Now", were made available on her self-titled EP, released on May 22, 2007, the day before the grand finale. The coronation song "This Is My Now" peaked at number fifteen on the Billboard Hot 100, becoming Sparks's first top-fifteen hit on the chart. The following summer, Sparks took part in the American Idols LIVE! Tour 2007 from July 6 to September 23, 2007, along with other contestants in the top ten.

Since her win in 2007, Sparks has returned to Idol six times. She performed twice on the seventh season of American Idol, once on the Idol Gives Back results show singing "No Air" with Chris Brown and again with "One Step at a Time" on May 21, 2008, for the finale. She performed "Battlefield" on the May 13, 2009, episode of American Idol.

The following year, on May 26, 2010, Sparks took part in a tribute to Simon Cowell with other former contestants at the ninth season finale. During the tenth season, Sparks performed her new song "I Am Woman" on the Top 4 results show. She appeared on the finale of the eleventh season singing "You'll Never Walk Alone" alongside that year's fourth-place contestant Hollie Cavanagh. Sparks was the most recent female to win the competition until the twelfth season. In a comedic clip on the finale, "We Were Sabotaged", the boys of the twelfth season realize that she was the "mastermind" behind the girls' sabotage because it was five years since a girl had won.

Performances/results

Episode	Theme	Song choice	Original artist	Order #	Result
Audition	N/A	"Because You Loved Me"	Celine Dion	N/A	Advanced
Hollywood	N/A	"Some Kind of Wonderful"	Soul Brothers Six	N/A	Advanced
Top 24 (12 Women)	N/A	"Give Me One Reason"	Tracy Chapman	6	Safe
Top 20 (10 Women)	Dedication Week	"Reflection"	Christina Aguilera	6	Safe
Top 16 (8 Women)	N/A	"Heartbreaker"	Pat Benatar	1	Safe
Top 12	Diana Ross	"If We Hold on Together"	Diana Ross	12	Safe
Top 11	British Invasion	"I (Who Have Nothing)"	Ben E. King	7	Safe
Top 10	No Doubt/artists who inspire Gwen Stefani	"Hey Baby"	No Doubt	9	Safe
Top 9	American Classics	"On a Clear Day"	Tony Bennett	5	Safe^{1}
Top 8	Latin	"Rhythm Is Gonna Get You"	Gloria Estefan	6	Safe
Top 7	Country	"A Broken Wing"	Martina McBride	2	Safe
Top 6	Inspirational	"You'll Never Walk Alone"	Rodgers and Hammerstein	6	Safe
Top 6^{2}	Bon Jovi	"Livin' on a Prayer"	Bon Jovi	2	Safe
Top 4	Barry Gibb	"To Love Somebody" "Woman in Love"	Bee Gees; Barbra Streisand	4; 8	Safe
Top 3	Judge's Choice (Simon Cowell); Producer's Choice; Contestant's Choice	"Wishing on a Star" "She Works Hard for the Money" "I (Who Have Nothing)"	Rose Royce; Donna Summer; Ben E. King	1; 4; 7	Safe
Finale	New Song; Previous Song; Coronation Song	"Fighter" "A Broken Wing" "This Is My Now"	Christina Aguilera; Martina McBride; Jordin Sparks	2; 4; 6	Winner

- ^Note 1 When Ryan Seacrest announced the results for this particular night, Sparks was declared safe placing in the top three.
- ^Note 2 Due to the Idol Gives Back performance, the Top 6 remained intact for another week.

=== 2007–08: Jordin Sparks and breakthrough ===
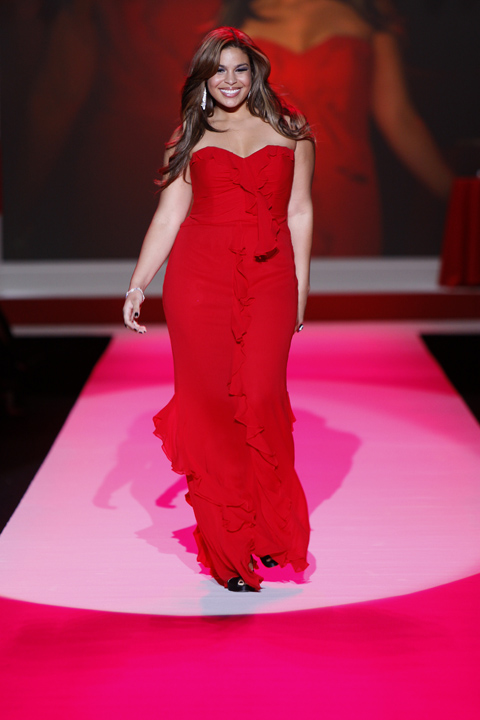
Sparks in Badgley Mischka

After winning American Idol in 2007, Sparks signed to 19 Recordings/Jive Records, becoming the first Idol winner to join the label. On August 27, she released her debut single, "Tattoo", which peaked at number eight on the Billboard Hot 100, becoming Sparks's first top-ten hit on the chart. The song certified platinum in the United States and Australia. To date, "Tattoo" has sold over two million copies in the U.S.

Sparks released her self-titled debut studio album on November 20, 2007, which debuted at number ten on the Billboard 200. To date, it has sold over a million copies in the U.S and was certified platinum by the RIAA. "No Air", a duet with Chris Brown, was released as the second single from the album in February 2008. In the United States, the song peaked at number three on the Billboard Hot 100 becoming Sparks's best-charting single to date. It was also her first song to appear on the Hot R&B/Hip-Hop Songs chart, where it reached number four. To date, the song has sold over three million copies in the U.S., making Sparks the first American Idol contestant to reach the three million mark. It also became Brown's first song to hit three million. "No Air" also charted in Australia and New Zealand, where it reached number one, receiving platinum certifications in both countries.

On February 3, 2008, Sparks sang the National Anthem at Super Bowl XLII. She performed in a tribute to Aretha Franklin at the NAACP Awards in February, as well. She had previously performed in a tribute to Diana Ross in December 2007.

In support of the album, Sparks opened for Alicia Keys on the North America leg of her As I Am Tour, starting on April 19, 2008. Before the tour, a career-threatening throat injury forced Sparks to cancel a few weeks of the shows. Officials revealed she was suffering an acute vocal cord hemorrhage and was ordered strict vocal rest until the condition improved. Sparks was back on the road by April 30, 2008, and remained on the tour until June 18, 2008. Sparks later joined Keys for the tour leg in Australia and New Zealand in December 2008.

The album's third single, "One Step at a Time", was released in June 2008. It peaked at number seventeen on the Billboard Hot 100, giving Sparks her fourth top twenty hit on the chart. This makes Sparks the only American Idol contestant to have her first four singles reach the top twenty of the Hot 100. It also charted in the top twenty in Australia, Canada, and the United Kingdom. In New Zealand, the song reached number two and was certified gold by the RIANZ. In August 2008, Sparks co-headlined the Jesse & Jordin LIVE Tour with Jesse McCartney in the United States and Canada.

Sparks received two MTV Video Music Award nominations for Best Female Video for "No Air" and Best New Artist at the 2008 MTV Video Music Awards. While at the award show, Sparks caused controversy by responding to a joke made by host Russell Brand during his opening monologue, in which he held up a silver ring, claiming to have relieved one of the Jonas Brothers of their virginity, saying he would "take them more seriously if they wore it (the ring) around their genitals". Sparks, who was also wearing a promise ring, began her introduction of T.I. and Rihanna by saying "It's not bad to wear a promise ring because not everybody, guy or girl, wants to be a slut." In response to the controversy over her "slut" remark, Sparks told Entertainment Weekly that she does not regret the remark, commenting that "I wish I would've worded it differently – that somebody who doesn't wear a promise ring isn't necessarily a slut – but I can't take it back now." At the 2008 American Music Awards, Sparks won the award for Favorite Artist in the Adult Contemporary Category.

=== 2009–10: Battlefield ===
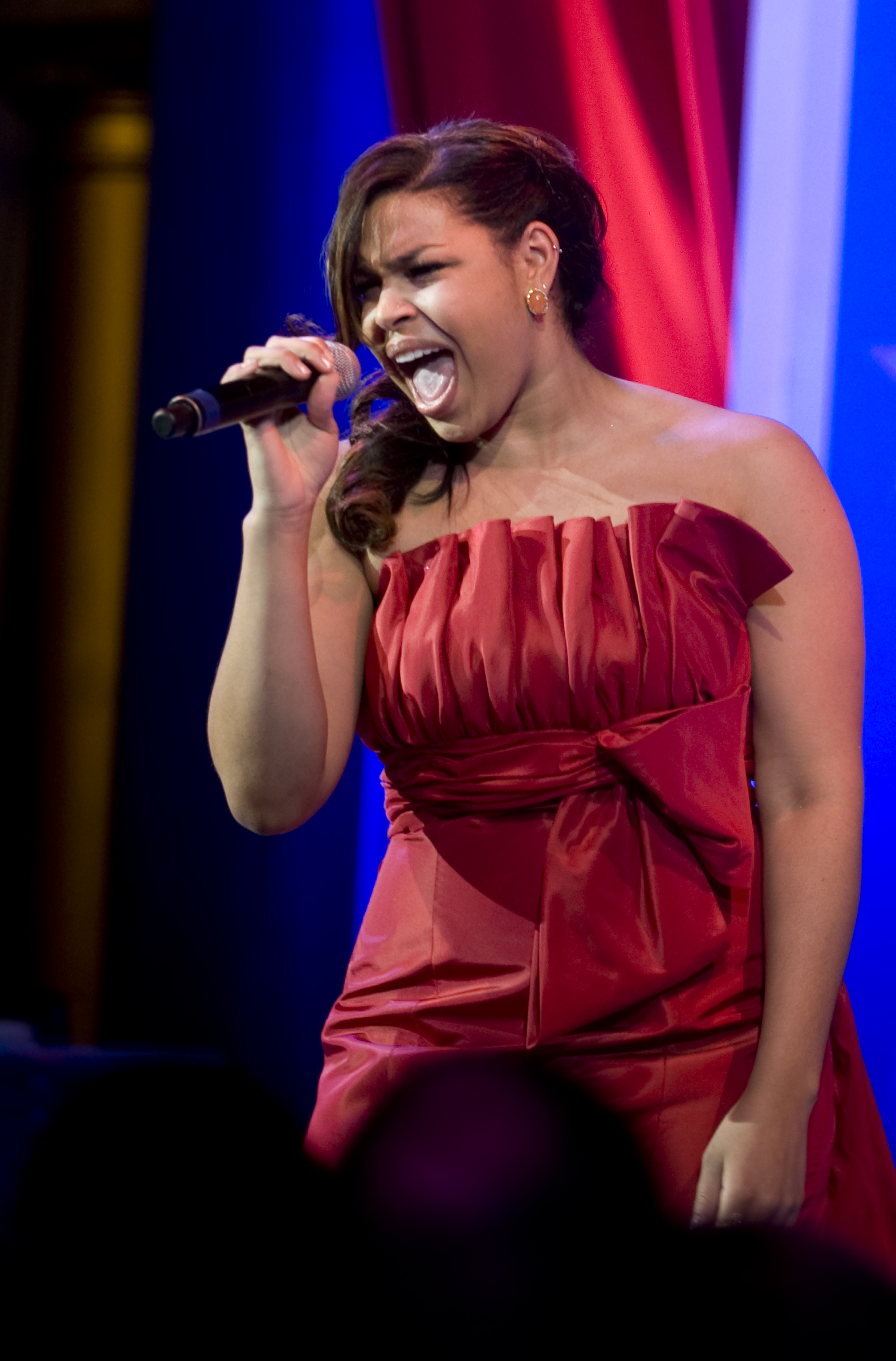
Sparks performing "Faith" at the Commander-in-Chief's Neighborhood Ball at the First inauguration of Barack Obama on January 20, 2009

On January 20, 2009, Sparks performed "Faith" at the Commander-in-Chief's Inaugural Ball hosted by President Barack Obama during the First inauguration of Barack Obama. Her second studio album, Battlefield was released in the United States on July 21. The album's title track was released as the lead single on May 25, 2009, and reached number ten on the Billboard Hot 100. The song peaked in the top five in Australia, Canada, and New Zealand. In the United States, Battlefield debuted at number seven on the Billboard 200, peaking higher than her debut album's position of number ten. However, the album was notably unsuccessful compared to her debut, only selling 177,000 copies in the U.S and having failed to earn any chart certificates.

In support of the album, Sparks opened for The Jonas Brothers on the North America leg of the Jonas Brothers World Tour 2009, starting on June 20, 2009. She also opened for Britney Spears on the second leg of her Circus Tour in North America, beginning on August 24, 2009. Sparks served as a replacement for Ciara. She opened with Kristinia DeBarge, Girlicious, and One Call.

"S.O.S. (Let the Music Play)", was released as the second single from Battlefield on September 15, 2009. The song topped the U.S. Hot Dance Club Songs chart, becoming Sparks's first number one on the chart and peaked in the top fifteen in the United Kingdom. During this time, Sparks also recorded the duet, "Art of Love", with Australian artist Guy Sebastian for his fifth studio album, Like It Like That. The song reached the top ten in Australia and New Zealand and was certified platinum by the Australian Recording Industry Association. The third single from Battlefield, "Don't Let It Go to Your Head", was released in the United Kingdom on January 8, 2010.

In May 2010, Sparks embarked on her first headlining tour in the United States, the Battlefield Tour. It began on May 1, and ended on July 18, 2010, stopping in over 35 major cities in the United States. In support of the DVD/Blu-ray re-release of the Disney animated film, Beauty and the Beast, Sparks recorded a cover of the film's title track for the soundtrack. A music video for the song was released on October 18, 2010.

=== 2010–12: Record label issues, compilations and films ===
In 2010, she was also featured on the Big Time Rush song "Count on You", and the show with the same name, "Big Time Sparks" which aired on June 18. In an October 2010 interview, Sparks revealed she had begun working on her third studio album. During an interview with Good Day New York in November 2010, Sparks confirmed she would be recording the album in New York and Arizona. In January 2011, it was reported that Sparks and John Legend were working on songs in the studio together.

In March 2011, Sparks recorded a music video for a song called "The World I Knew" for the film, African Cats, released on April 22. On May 5, 2011, it was revealed that Sparks would release a non-album single, "I Am Woman". To support her new single, Sparks served as an opening act for the NKOTBSB summer tour. On May 12, Sparks performed "I Am Woman" on the American Idol Top 4 results show. It debuted on the US Billboard Hot 100 at number eighty-two with 33,000 downloads sold. It also debuted on the US Billboard Digital Songs at number fifty-seven. Sparks performed "I Am Woman" on Regis and Kelly on June 14.

On June 16, 2011, Sparks had her first-ever bikini shoot for the cover of People's Most Amazing Bodies issue. When speaking about her weight loss and diet to Access Hollywood, Sparks said, "My diet has pretty much remained the same, like if I want a piece of bread, I'm gonna have a piece of bread, but I'm making healthier decisions like instead of a bag of chips for a snack, I'll see if I can find an apple. I've also upped my intake of vegetables and I'm drinking a lot more water."

Sparks stated in an August 2011 interview there was no scheduled release date for her third album which was still in production. A song, "You Gotta Want It", was to be part of an NFL compilation album, Official Gameday Music of the NFL Vol. 2. According to reports, the song would be available to download on iTunes and Amazon on September 27. The song was co-written by Chris Weaver and Matthew J. Rogers while being produced by Cash Money Records' Cool & Dre. On October 7, 2011, RCA Music Group announced it was disbanding Jive Records along with Arista Records and J Records. With the shutdown, Sparks (and all other artists previously signed to these three labels) would release her future material (including her upcoming third studio album) on the RCA Records brand. On November 14, 2011, it was announced that Sparks had recorded an original song called "Angels Are Singing" as a part of ABC Family's "12 Dates of Christmas". On February 29, 2012, Sparks's boyfriend Jason Derulo took to Twitter announcing the official remix of his single "It Girl" featuring Sparks. There was a video released with the remix, which showed home videos, of Derulo and Sparks together as well as pictures.

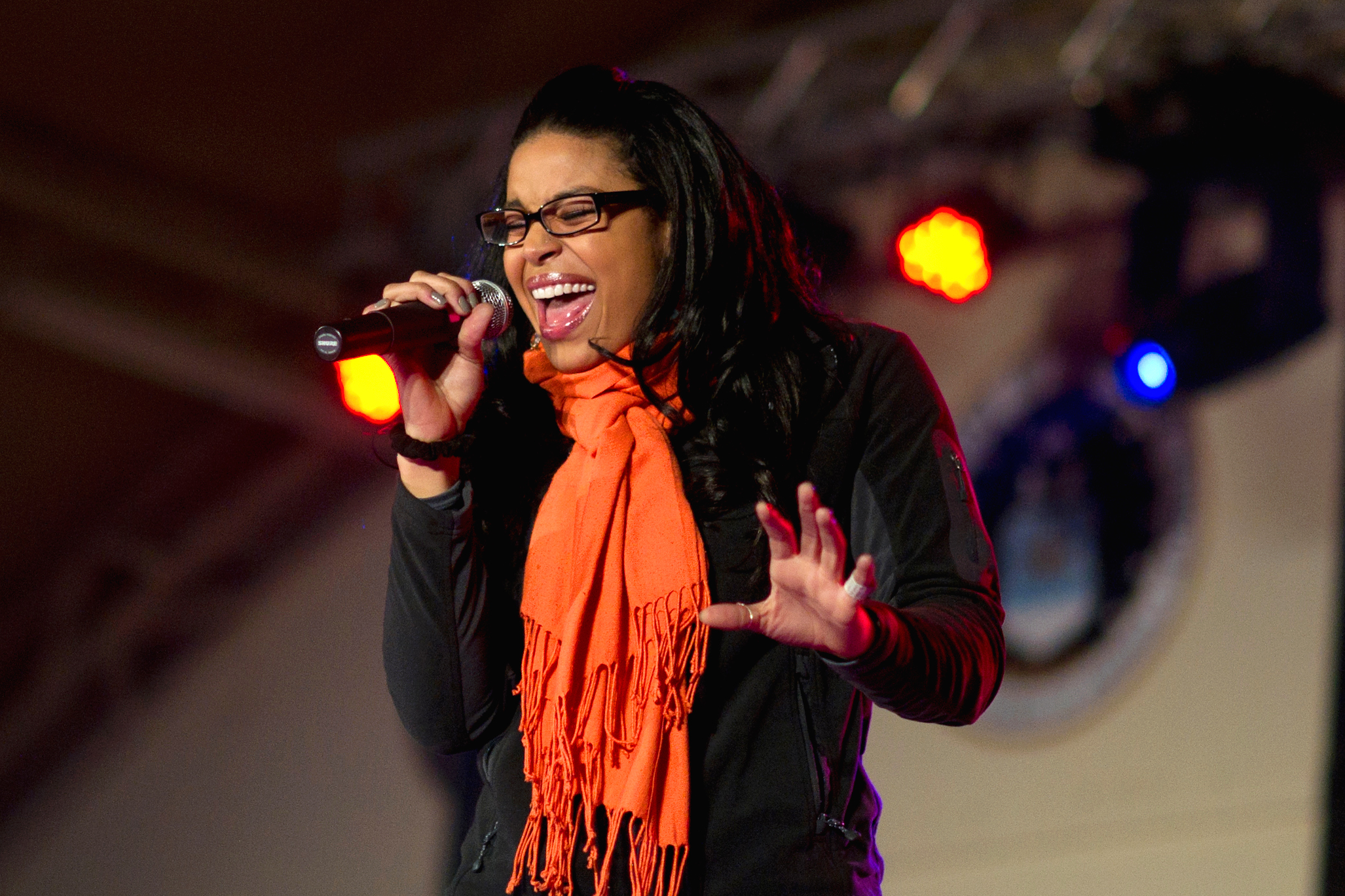
Sparks performing at the USO Show at Camp Buehring in 2011

On September 12, 2011, it was announced that Sparks would be making her feature film debut playing the lead role in the music-themed pic Sparkle, a remake of the 1976 film inspired by the story of The Supremes. The remake was set in 1968 Detroit, during the rise of Motown. The story focused on the youngest sister, a music prodigy named Sparkle Williams (Sparks), and her struggle to become a star while overcoming issues that were tearing her family apart. R&B singer Aaliyah was originally tapped to star as Sparkle; however, following her death in a 2001 plane crash, production on the film, which was scheduled for 2002, had been derailed. Sparkle was filmed in the fall of 2011 over a two-month period. The film, starring both Sparks and Houston, was released on August 17, 2012, in the United States. On May 21, 2012, "Celebrate", the last song Whitney Houston recorded with Sparks, premiered at RyanSeacrest.com. It was made available for digital download on iTunes on June 5. The song was featured on the Sparkle: Original Motion Picture Soundtrack album as the first official single. The accompanying music video for Celebrate was filmed on May 30, 2012. The video was shot over 2 days and was released on June 27. A sneak peek of the video premiered on entertainment tonight on June 4, 2012.

On July 24, 2012, it was officially announced that Sparks would star in her second film, an indie drama titled "'The Inevitable Defeat of Mister & Pete'". Produced by Street State Pictures, the George Tillman Jr-directed film stars Jennifer Hudson, Sparks, Jeffrey Wright, and Anthony Mackie. Alicia Keys is the film's executive producer. Production on the film began on July 23, 2012, in Brooklyn.

On August 9, 2012, Sparks stated in an interview with Billboard, that she had about seven songs set so far for her third album. Sparks stated "It's going to be different from what my fans have heard before. With (2009's) 'Battlefield' it was pop/rock and a little bit of pop/R&B, but I'm going for more of the R&B side now, so it's like R&B/pop instead of pop/R&B." In an interview with MTV, Sparks confirmed she had recorded a duet with Jason Derulo and it would be on the album and could serve as a potential single. Sparks performed on VH1 Divas 2012 with fellow singers Miley Cyrus, Kelly Rowland and Ciara. The show premiered on December 16, 2012. Sparks joined singers Ledisi and Melanie Fiona in a tribute to Whitney Houston.

=== 2013–14: Solo music hiatus, Left Behind and label change ===
In May 2013, Sparks took to Twitter announcing that she and RCA Records had finally come to an agreement about releasing new material. Sparks asked her fans to email her their opinions and frustrations regarding the delay in the release of her third studio album. Sparks later announced that her new music would be released in the fall of 2013.

On July 22, 2013, it was announced that the first promotional track from her upcoming third studio album would be released in August. The song "Skipping a Beat" was officially released on August 1, 2013. The buzz single became available for download on August 13. Sparks was featured on "Vertigo" from Jason Derulo's third studio album, Tattoos, which was released on September 24. It was announced that Sparks's third album had officially been completed and was awaiting release. However, it was later announced that new music from Sparks would not be released until early 2014 due to timing issues with acting projects as well as placement issues within her label RCA.

On August 9, 2013, it was announced that Sparks had signed on to join the cast of the action science fiction-thriller film Left Behind. It was then revealed that Sparks's character was named Shasta, but for the most part, her role was kept under wraps. One of the film's producers Paul Lalonde said that "She will be a passenger on a plane that the film's main character Captain Rayford Steele is piloting". It was later announced that Sparks would co-star alongside Nicolas Cage as Captain Rayford Steele, Chad Michael Murray as Cameron "Buck" Williams and Nicky Whelan as Hattie Durham. Scheduled for release on October 3, 2014, the film's shooting began on August 9, 2013, in Baton Rouge, Louisiana. On October 7, 2013, it was announced that Sparks would guest star in an upcoming episode in the fourteenth season of CSI: Crime Scene Investigation. Sparks played Alison Stone, a high school teacher who somehow found herself scared and covered in blood in a hotel room crime scene. The season episode, "Check In & Check Out" was set to air on November 20, 2013.

On December 9, 2013, Sparks partnered with Glade and the Young People's Chorus of New York City to release a brand new Christmas holiday anthem "This Is My Wish". From December 9 until December 31, 2013, the song was made available for free download through Glade's official website. Sparks made her first televised performance of the song on the same day on The Today Show.

After experiencing multiple delays in the release of Sparks's third album due to RCA refusing to put her in their roster, citing that her acting projects had prevented them from reaching a deal, Sparks was released from her contract with RCA records and eventually signed to Salaam Remi's new label imprint 'Louder than Life', a subsidiary of Sony Music. Remi had previously worked with Sparks on the Sparkle film soundtrack. As a result of the new deal, all the material Sparks had previously recorded for her third album under RCA had subsequently been scrapped and she had been re-recording and writing new material for her third album since January 2014. An official announcement of Sparks's signing to the new label had only been released a year later in August 2014.

=== 2014–2017: #ByeFelicia and Right Here Right Now ===
On May 8, 2014, it was announced that Sparks would be hosting the 2014 Billboard Music Awards 'Samsung Red Carpet', alongside Lance Bass and Ted Stryker. Sparks was also listed to present. In an interview with AOL Radio News on May 30, Sparks announced that the first official single off her upcoming third studio album would have a summer 2014 release, with a fall 2014 album release. The album and single were expected to be released through RCA Records.

On August 15, 2014, Salaam Remi took to Instagram to preview the logo for his new label, Louder than Life, a subsidiary of Sony Music. Remi also announced that Sparks was now a part of the Louder than Life roster. In an article with Music Connection, Remi also announced he would be producing Sparks's upcoming album. During a promotional tour for the film Left Behind, Sparks announced that she was in the finishing stages of her new album. Sparks also confirmed that she was no longer with her previous label, RCA Records, and stated that her single was due by the end of the year, with an album release in 2015. Sparks then mentioned that she and her label were picking the first single, first look, and deciding on the album name.

On September 30, 2014, Sparks's label released a promotional single for Left Behind, titled "I Wish We'd All Been Ready", which became available on music outlets the same day. On October 23, Remi hosted a music showcase featuring Sparks. Sparks showcased three songs, two of which were performed live. Sparks announced this was the first time she performed new music for people outside of the industry. On November 4, Sparks announced that the first single off her upcoming third album would be released in a two-week time frame. Sparks's announcement to Lance Bass brought speculation that the single would be released on November 18, 2014. On November 23, Sparks announced during an interview at the American Music Awards that new music would be released on November 25, 2014. Following that announcement, Sparks posted a clip of a song, "How Bout Now", a remix of Drake's song. On November 24, Sparks followed up with the official release of "How Bout Now", which debuted on the 'LALeakers' SoundCloud page and website. Sparks also stated that the official release of her mixtape, #ByeFelicia, would be released the following day at 11:11 PST.

On November 25, it was announced that Sparks would release her third studio album, Right Here Right Now, in early 2015, under Louder Than Life/Red Associated Labels, subsidiaries of Sony Music Entertainment, in conjunction with 19 Recordings.

On December 2, the song "It Ain't You" from Sparks's mixtape #ByeFelicia, became available for pre-order on major music markets and was also uploaded to Sparks's Vevo YouTube page. The single was released on December 15, 2014, as a promotional single from Sparks's third album. On December 16, Right Here Right Now became available for pre-order on Sparks's official website. On February 11, 2015, Double Tap, the first single for Sparks's album became available for pre-order. The single featuring 2Chainz was released on March 2, followed by the music video on March 10, with the album's release date officially set for August 21, 2015. That year, Sparks performed "The Star-Spangled Banner" at the 2015 Indianapolis 500.

In May 2016, Sparks was cast in the feature film God Bless the Broken Road, based on the song of the same name.

On May 20, 2016, Sparks parted ways with her record company, Louder Than Life.

On October 2, 2016, Food Network aired "Keep it Simple, Sparks", a pilot episode of Sparks's potential series Sugar and Sparks, focusing on her dream to own her own bakery and mastering the baking industry with the help of Duff Goldman. However, the show was not picked up for a full season.

In 2017, Sparks joined Thomas Rhett and Molly Sims in judging Miss America 2018.

=== 2018–2022: Reality show and return to music ===
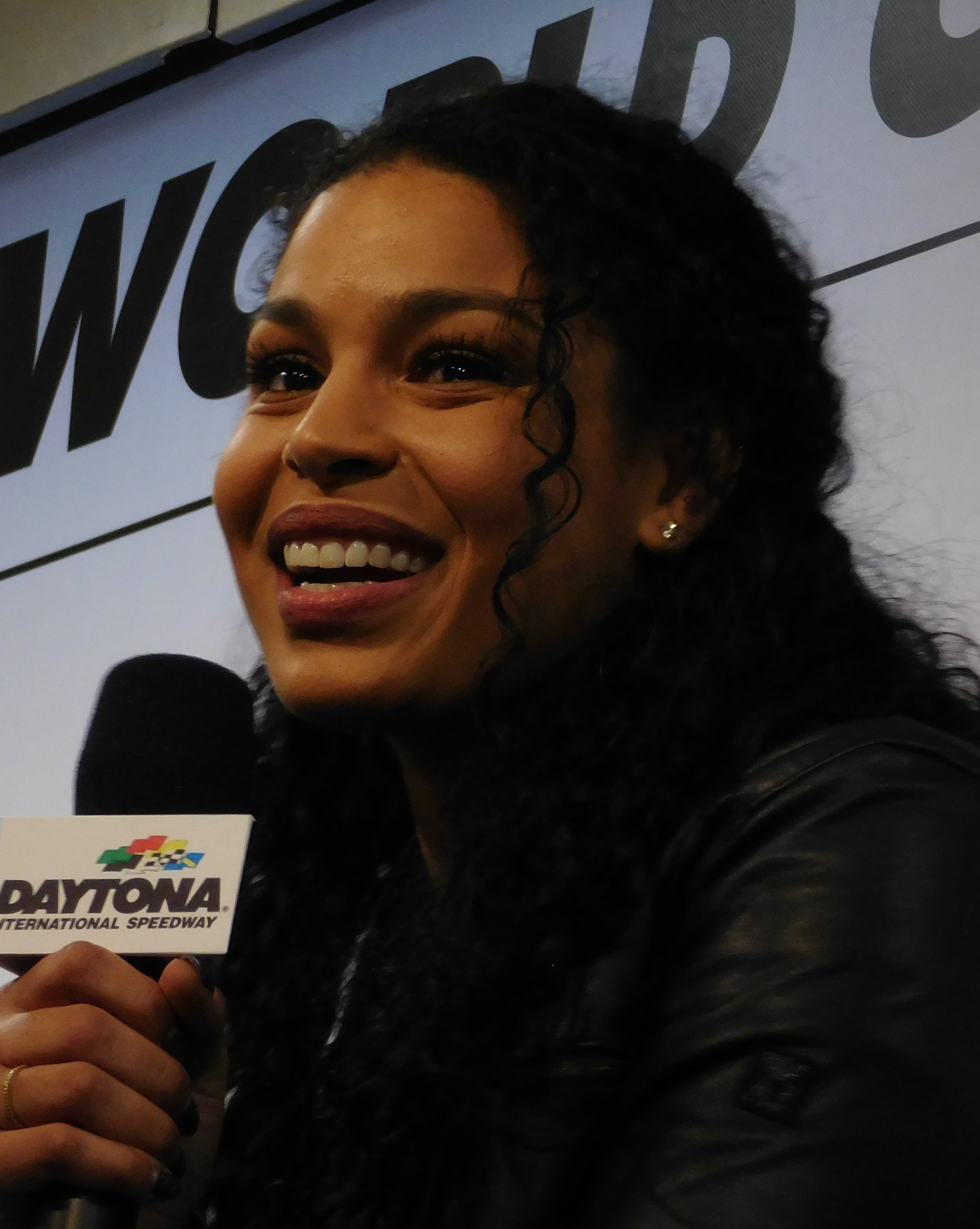
Jordin Sparks in 2017

On February 12, 2018, Sparks stated in an interview with OK magazine that she was recording her fourth album. Sparks, who is currently unsigned, said she had finished five to six songs for the album, drawing inspiration from her new marriage and son.

In May 2018, Sparks and her husband Dana began production on their reality show. She said "they [will] get to see just Jordin. Drop the Sparks and you just get to see Jordin, and you get to see Dana, and you get to see both of us together and how we interact". She continued, saying "I'm super excited for people to see it. It's been a little exhausting. I'm not used to cameras all in my face all the time, but I think it's really going to show a good side of us." In August 2018, KIN Network released a web series, Heart of Batter with Jordin Sparks, focused on Sparks's love for baking. On August 28, it was announced that the pilot for Sparks' special Jordin Sparks: A Baby Story would air September 6 on Lifetime. In 2019, Sparks released 1990 Forever, a joint EP with R&B singer Elijah Blake. That same year, Sparks was cast as a Broadway replacement for Jenna Hunterson in Waitress, from September 16 to November 24.

On June 2, 2020, after over five years of not releasing any solo music, Sparks returned with the single "Unknown". On July 31, she released another new single, "Red Sangria". In 2021, Sparks competed on The Masked Dancer as "Exotic Bird" and finished in fifth place. Sparks was a contestant on the thirty-first season of Dancing with the Stars. She was partnered with Brandon Armstrong, until their elimination on October 31.

In October 2020, Sparks was featured on the single "Pink" alongside Dolly Parton, Monica, Sara Evans and Rita Wilson. The single was released in aid of Breast Cancer Research.

=== 2023–present: No Restrictions ===
On October 10, 2023, Sparks announced the upcoming release of her new single off her upcoming album, "Call My Name", on October 13. The single peaked at No. 18 on iTunes R&B/Soul: USA. "Call My Name" was also the No. 1 added song on Urban/R&B radio for week ending October 21. On October 30, 2023, Sparks sang "The Star-Spangled Banner" before the third game of the 2023 World Series. Sparks released her fifth studio album, No Restrictions on September 13, 2024.

In 2023, Sparks entered into a successful partnership with the soundtracking platform Epidemic Sound. This collaboration resulted in two holiday-themed EPs: The Gift of Christmas (2023) and Joy (2024). The tracks from the first EP generated significant online engagement, with over 511 million views across TikTok and YouTube. The second EP, Joy, featured four classic Christmas covers ("Deck the Halls," "Joy to the World," "O Come, O Come, Emmanuel," and "What Child Is This?") arranged with jazz, gospel, and classical influences.

== Personal life ==
Sparks and Jason Derulo dated for three years, ending their relationship in 2014.

On July 17, 2017, Sparks married Dana Isaiah (born: Dana Isaiah Thomas), a fitness model, in Hawaii. In November 2017, People magazine published news of her pregnancy. On May 2, 2018, Sparks gave birth to her first child, a son.

== Other ventures ==
=== Endorsements ===
In April 2008, it was announced that Sparks would team up with cosmetics company, Avon, to become a spokesperson for the teen-focused line Mark. In November 2008, Sparks teamed up with Wet Seal to create her own clothing line 'Sparks', The line launched on November 19, 2008, featuring sizes XS to XL. Sparks said, "I am so excited that Wet Seal and I have been able to create a line of clothing that will appeal to more girls than ever before."

In October 2010, Sparks released her debut fragrance, Because of You... This fragrance was exclusively distributed at first by Dots Department Stores, but by November was made available to other retail stores. Sparks wanted this product to be affordable for her fans, yet still high end. "When I was starting this project, I really wanted it to be affordable. I looked at some other celebrity fragrances, and they were like $80. Even now, I look at a fragrance that's $80, and I can't bring myself to spend that much." In March 2012, due to the success of her first fragrance, Sparks released her second fragrance, Fascinate, exclusively with Dots Fashions as a sister scent to her first. On October 22, 2012, it was announced that Sparks was releasing her third fragrance Ambition. In an interview Sparks said; "Right now, I feel like I can take on the world. Ambition is the perfect word for where I am in my life right now". Her new scent was made available in retail stores such as Bon-Ton. It was released in stores and online on November 8, 2012, before Sparks presented the fragrance at an official launch party in Milwaukee on December 1, 2012.

=== Acting and Broadway ===
In 2009, Sparks made her acting debut on Disney's The Suite Life on Deck, guest starring as herself in the "Crossing Jordin" episode, which aired on October 23. She also guest starred on the hit Nickelodeon show, Big Time Rush, on June 18, 2010.

On May 3, 2010, it was announced that Sparks would join the cast of the Broadway show In the Heights as Nina Rosario. She took part in the production from August 19 through November 14 for a consecutive 12 weeks. In addition, Sparks did a voice over on Team Umizoomi as the Blue Mermaid. The episode aired on May 13, 2011.

The following year, Sparks made her film debut in Sparkle. Following the release of Sparkle in 2012, Sparks began auditioning for several television and film roles while also receiving scripts from companies interested in having her a part of their projects. First of which was an indie drama film, The Inevitable Defeat of Mister & Pete, which follows two inner-city youths left to fend for themselves over the summer after their mothers are taken away by the authorities. Sparks plays Alice, a neighbor and friend of the character Mister. Playing Nicole Lovely, the preacher's daughter, Sparks would also be in the film, The Grace of Jake, which follows ex-inmate and wandering musician Jake who travels to a small town in Arkansas intent on exacting revenge from his father, but begins to unravel a complicated family history as he befriends the locals. The film was in post production and set for release on October 3, 2014.

In 2013, Sparks played the part of Abby in Dear Secret Santa, a Lifetime Television romantic Christmas film that premiered on November 30. Sparks also guest starred on CSI: Crime Scene Investigation, playing Alison Stone, a high school teacher who somehow finds herself scared and covered in blood in a hotel room crime scene. The season episode, "Check In & Check Out" aired on November 20. Sparks played Shasta Carvell in Left Behind, an apocalyptic thriller, based on the novel series of the same name. The film is a reboot of Left Behind: The Movie, which is based on the idea of a pre-tribulation Rapture.

=== Philanthropy ===
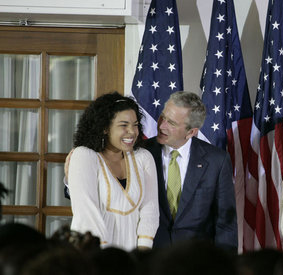
US President George W. Bush congratulates Sparks after she sang the U.S. national anthem during the welcome for President Bush and Laura Bush to the Ambassador's Residence in Ghana

In 2007, Sparks was asked by a relative who works for SOS Children's Villages in Florida to design a denim jacket festooned with Swarovski Crystal to support orphans. In February 2008, Sparks traveled to Ghana. She was part of the delegation of (then presidential couple) George and Laura Bush to help with Malaria No More, an organization with a goal to end malaria deaths in Africa by 2015. Sparks joined Laura Bush at the Maamobi Polyclinic, where the Bushes donated a number of treated bed nets to local female traders in order to help combat the scourge of malaria in Ghana. While there, Sparks sang "Amazing Grace" to the durbar of chieftains who had gathered at the venue to give audience to Laura Bush. Sparks said, "Traveling to Ghana with Malaria No More gives me the incredible opportunity to see for myself what a difference a simple mosquito net can make in the life of a child."

In 2008, Sparks supported Dosomething.org's Do Something 101 campaign by filming a public service announcement explaining the nationwide school supplies drive project. She further supported the campaign by helping out at the Do Something 101 School Supply Volunteer Event held at the Staples Center in Los Angeles.

On May 20, 2009, Sparks became an endorser for the Got Milk? campaign, an American advertising campaign encouraging the consumption of cow's milk. On September 17, Sparks took part in the VH1 Divas special, a concert created to support the channel's Save The Music Foundation. The concert was held at the Brooklyn Academy of Music in New York where Sparks performed the second single from her Battlefield album, S.O.S. (Let the Music Play), as well as "A Broken Wing" with Martina McBride. In February 2010, Sparks was one of the many artists who contributed to "We Are the World 25 for Haiti", a charity single for the victims of the 2010 Haiti earthquake. Sparks teamed up with Pennyroyal Silver creator and designer, Tim Foster, to create her very own necklace design for the company's signature collection. Proceeds of the necklace funded medical units in Haiti.

On July 28, 2011, Sparks performed a live surprise concert in Times Square. Sparks was named the "VH1 Save The Music Foundation Ambassador" in 2011. On November 9, it was announced that Sparks would be a 'Vh1 Save the Music Ambassador' again for 2012. Sparks was joined by fellow American Idol contestant Chris Daughtry, Lupe Fiasco, Katy Perry and others. During Sparks segment as ambassador she hosted a surprise concert series in Times Square. Sparks and VH1 gave fans the opportunity to submit an essay on 'What Music Means to you?'. The winner of the essay contest won a trip for two, to New York City to stand alongside Sparks at her pop-up concert. The winner chosen was Deavan Ebersole, from Hagerstown, Maryland.

Sparks has also shown support for Little Kids Rock, a national non-profit that works to restore and revitalize music education in disadvantaged US public schools, by donating items for auction to raise money for the organization.

=== I'm M.A.D. Are You? campaign ===
Initiated by Sparks and her younger brother P.J. in 2008, the I'm M.A.D. Are You? campaign cultivates community advocacy and volunteerism among teens and young adults. M.A.D. stands for Making A Difference. On February 3, 2010, Sparks and David Archuleta performed at the "Jordin Sparks Experience", held at the Eden Roc Renaissance Hotel in Miami Beach, Florida. All proceeds raised by the event went to a number of charities, including the Miami Children's Hospital Foundation. Since 2008, Sparks and the campaign travels to the Super Bowls designated city to host a week of charitable events, to raise money for several charities. In June 2010, the "Thumbs Up to X the TXT" pledge campaign, established by Allstate, made its way to Sparks's Battlefield Tour, presented by Mike & Ike to encourage teens and their families not to text while driving. Fans at Sparks's concerts made a pledge not to text and drive by adding their thumbprint to a traveling banner at each of her shows. The campaign began at Sparks's Battlefield Tour on June 3, 2010, and ended on July 18, 2010. Sparks is the main spokesperson for the "I'm M.A.D., Are You?" campaign. She also supports Alex's Lemonade Stand Foundation, which helps to raise money for children with cancer. Sparks traveled to Louisiana in June 2010 to visit the Gulf Coast oil spill with the Audubon Society to view the effects of the oil spill on the wildlife and marshes. Since 2008, the campaign has raised over $500,000.

== Discography ==
Studio albums

- Jordin Sparks (2007)
- Battlefield (2009)
- Right Here Right Now (2015)
- Cider & Hennessy (2020)
- No Restrictions (2024)

== Tours ==
=== Headlining ===
- 2010: Battlefield Tour
- 2024: No Restrictions: Live & Intimate

=== Joint tours ===
- 2007: American Idols LIVE! Tour 2007
- 2008: Jesse & Jordin Live

=== Opening act ===
- 2008: As I Am Tour
- 2009: Jonas Brothers World Tour 2009
- 2009: The Circus Starring Britney Spears
- 2011: NKOTBSB Tour

== Filmography ==
=== Film ===
Year	Title	Role	Notes
2012	Sparkle	Sparkle Anderson	
2013	The Inevitable Defeat of Mister & Pete	Alice	
2013	Dear Secret Santa	Abby	Television film
2014	Left Behind	Shasta Carvell	
2015	The Grace of Jake	Nicole Lovely	
2018	Show Dogs	Daisy	Voice
2018	God Bless the Broken Road	Bridgette	
2021	A Christmas Treasure	Lou	Television film
2025	Merry Little Mystery		
2026	The Pout-Pout Fish	Shimmer	Voice

=== Television ===
Year	Title	Role	Notes
2007	American Idol	Herself	Contestant: Season 6
2008	So You Think You Can Dance	Herself/Musical Guest	Episode: "Results Show: Two Dancers Eliminated"
2008	Australian Idol	Herself	Episode: "Top 12 Verdict"
2008	Super Bowl XLII	Herself	National Anthem
2009	Britain's Got Talent	Herself	Episode: "Episode 3.11"
2009	The Suite Life on Deck	Herself	Episode: "Crossing Jordin"
2010	Katelyn Tarver TV	Herself	Episode: "Cambio"
2010	Big Time Rush	Herself	Episode: "Big Time Sparks"
2011	BrainSurge	Herself	Episode: "Episode 2.35"
2011	Majors & Minors	Herself/Mentor	2 episodes
2011	Team Umizoomi	Blue Mermaid	Voice, episode: "The Legend of the Blue Mermaid"
2011	2011 Major League Baseball All-Star Game	Herself	National Anthem
2013	CSI: Crime Scene Investigation	Alison	Episode: "Check In & Check Out"
2014	CollegeHumor Originals	Herself	Episode: "Star Wars Cantina Band Auditions"
2014	Great Performances	Herself/Co-Host	Episode: "Star-Spangled Spectacular: Bicentennial of Our National Anthem"
2015	RuPaul's Drag Race	Herself/Guest Judge	Episode: "Glamazonian Airways"
2015	Wild 'n Out	Herself	Episode: "Jordin Sparks/Snoop Dogg"
2016	Ridiculousness	Herself	Episode: "Jordin Sparks"
2016	Zoe Ever After	Herself	Episode: "Game Face"
2016	Sugar & Sparks	Herself/Host	Main Host
2017	The Real O'Neals	Herself	Episode: "The Real Confirmation"
2017	Miss America 2018	Herself/Judge	Main Judge
2017	Time After Time	Jesse Givens	Episode: "Pilot"
2017	2017 NBA Finals	Herself	National Anthem
2017–25	Hell's Kitchen	Herself	Chef's table guest diner for the red team; 2 episodes
2019	Love & Listings	Herself	Episode: "Can't We All Just Get a Loan?"
2021	The Masked Dancer	Exotic Bird	
2021	Doug Unplugs	Gary's Mom	Voice, episode: "Botty Holidays"
2022	Rugrats	Tabitha	Voice, episode: "Rescuing Cynthia"
2022	Dancing with the Stars	Contestant	Season 31
2023	Whose Line is it Anyway?	Herself	Season 20 Episode 13: "Jordin Sparks"
2023	2023 World Series	Herself	National Anthem
2024	Indianapolis 500	Herself	National Anthem
2025–present	The Chosen Adventures	Fish	Voice only, recurring role

=== Broadway ===
Broadway and Theater roles
Year	Title	Role	Notes
2010	In the Heights	Nina Rosario	Broadway musical
2019	Waitress	Jenna	Broadway musical

== Awards and nominations ==
Year	Award	Category	Nominee / Work	Result
2007	Teen Choice Awards	Choice Female Reality/Variety Star	Herself	Nominated
2008	NAACP Image Awards	Outstanding New Artist	Herself	Won
2008	BET Pre-Awards	Best Heartbreak Video	"No Air"	Won
2008	BET Awards	Viewer's Choice	"No Air"	Nominated
2008	BET Awards	Beautiful Face Award	Herself	Won
2008	Teen Choice Awards	Choice Hook-Up	"No Air"	Won
2008	Teen Choice Awards	Choice Love Song	"No Air"	Nominated
2008	Teen Choice Awards	Choice Breakout Artist	Herself	Nominated
2008	MTV Video Music Awards	Best Female Video	"No Air"	Nominated
2008	MTV Video Music Awards	Best New Artist	Herself	Nominated
2008	American Music Awards	Favorite Adult Contemporary Artist	Herself	Won
2009	Grammy Awards	Best Pop Collaboration with Vocals	"No Air"	Nominated
2009	People's Choice Awards	Favorite Pop Song	"No Air"	Nominated
2009	People's Choice Awards	Favorite Combined Forces	"No Air"	Won
2009	People's Choice Awards	Favorite Star Under 35	Herself	Nominated
2009	BMI Pop Awards		"No Air"	Won
2009	NAACP Image Awards	Outstanding Duo, Group or Collaboration	"No Air"	Nominated
2009	MTV Australia Awards	Best Collaboration	"No Air"	Nominated
2010	ARIA Music Awards	Most Popular Australian Single	"Art of Love" (with Guy Sebastian)	Nominated
2012	Soul Train Awards	Best Gospel/Inspirational Performance	"Celebrate" (with Whitney Houston)	Won
2014	BMI Pop Awards	Songwriter	"The Way" (by Ariana Grande)	Won
2023	Grammy Awards	Best Contemporary Christian Music Performance/Song	"Love Me Like I Am" (with For King & Country)	Nominated

== See also ==
- List of Idols winners
