= Double Tap (Jordin Sparks song) =

Single by Jordin Sparks featuring 2 Chainz

from the album Right Here Right Now
- Released: March 3, 2015
- Recorded: 2014
- Studio: Conway Recording Studios (Los Angeles, CA); Wolf Cousins Studios (Stockholm, Sweden)
- Genre: Hip hop; pop; R&B
- Length: 3:34
- Label: 19; Louder Than Life; Sony Music; RED
- Songwriters: Jonas Jeberg; Tauheed Epps; Victoria Monét; Thomas "Tommy" Parker Lumpkins
- Producer: Jonas Jeberg

Jordin Sparks singles chronology
"It Ain't You" (2014)	"Double Tap" (2015)	"Right Here Right Now" (2015)

2 Chainz singles chronology
"Hood Go Crazy" (2015)	"Double Tap" (2015)	"3500" (2015)

"Double Tap" is a song recorded by American singer-songwriter Jordin Sparks, featuring Atlanta based rapper 2 Chainz. The song was released by Louder Than Life & Sony Music on March 3, 2015, as the lead single from Sparks' third studio album Right Here Right Now (2015). The song was written by Victoria Monét McCants, Thomas "Tommy" Parker Lumpkins & Tauheed Epps and Jonas Jeberg, with the latter also producing the track.

== Music video ==
The music video for "Double Tap" was released on March 11, 2015, via Sparks' VEVO account.

== Formats and track listings ==
- Digital download (catalog number 0886445064872)
1. "Double Tap (featuring 2 Chainz)" - 3:30

== Credits and personnel ==
Recording locations

- Conway Studios, Los Angeles, CA
- Wolf Cousins Studios, Stockholm, Sweden

Vocal credits

- Jordin Sparks – lead vocals
- 2 Chainz – featured artist

Technical credits

- Songwriting – Jonas Jeberg, Tauheed Epps, Thomas "Tommy" Parker Lumpkins, Victoria Monet McCants
- Production – Jonas Jeberg
- Engineering – Finis "KY" White*, Gleyder "Gee" Disla, Jonas Jeberg
- Engineering assistant – Ryan Kaul
- Mixing – Jaycen Joshua
- Mixing engineer – Jaycen Joshua
- Mastering – Ari Blitz, Larry Ryckman

== Charts ==
Chart (2015)	Peak; position
US Hot R&B Songs (Billboard)	25

== Radio and release history ==
Country	Date	Format	Label
Canada	March 2, 2015	Digital download	Sony Music; 19; Louder Than Life
United States	March 2, 2015	Digital download	Sony Music; 19; Louder Than Life
Australia	March 2, 2015	Digital download	Sony Music; 19; Louder Than Life
Belgium	March 2, 2015	Digital download	Sony Music; 19; Louder Than Life
Denmark	March 2, 2015	Digital download	Sony Music; 19; Louder Than Life
Finland	March 2, 2015	Digital download	Sony Music; 19; Louder Than Life
France	March 2, 2015	Digital download	Sony Music; 19; Louder Than Life
Germany	March 2, 2015	Digital download	Sony Music; 19; Louder Than Life
Italy	March 2, 2015	Digital download	Sony Music; 19; Louder Than Life
Netherlands	March 2, 2015	Digital download	Sony Music; 19; Louder Than Life
New Zealand	March 2, 2015	Digital download	Sony Music; 19; Louder Than Life
Norway	March 2, 2015	Digital download	Sony Music; 19; Louder Than Life
Sweden	March 2, 2015	Digital download	Sony Music; 19; Louder Than Life
United Kingdom	March 2, 2015	Digital download	Sony Music; 19; Louder Than Life
United States	March 3, 2015	Rhythmic contemporary	Louder Than Life
Germany	March 6, 2015	CD single	Sony Music; 19; Louder Than Life
