= I Am Woman (Jordin Sparks song) =

Single by Jordin Sparks
- Released: May 17, 2011
- Genre: R&B
- Length: 3:30
- Label: Jive
- Songwriter(s): Ali Pierre, Dean Josiah, Ryan Tedder
- Producer(s): Ryan Tedder

Jordin Sparks singles chronology
"Don't Let It Go to Your Head" (2010)	"I Am Woman" (2011)	"Celebrate" (2012)

"I Am Woman" is a song performed by American recording artist Jordin Sparks. The song was written by Ali Pierre Gaschani, Dean Josiah and Ryan Tedder, who also produced the track. "I Am Woman" premiered online via AOL Music on May 5, 2011, and was later officially released in the United States on May 10, 2011. The song's lyrics contain a message towards female empowerment, which talks about different aspects of the lives of women.

"I Am Woman" received a positive reception from most music critics, who complimented its differences with any of Sparks' previous singles, as well as noting its similarities to the sounds of American R&B singer Beyoncé.

== Background ==
"I Am Woman" premiered online via AOL Music on May 5, 2011. It was written by Ali Pierre, Dean Josiah and Ryan Tedder, who also produced the track. "I Am Woman" was made available for download on iTunes Stores worldwide on May 6, 2011, and later in the United States on May 10, 2011.

On speaking about the song, Sparks said "I Am Woman is a song about different aspects of the lives of women. It could be a mother, a performer, a woman working in a corporate space — it's all about what we go through as women and how our lives are so crazy. Walk a mile in my shoes, or in my stilettos, if you dare and see what happens. It's all about the strengths that a woman has: how we can multitask and carry so much, yet still always be on point when we need to be and on cue when we need to be. It's all about the amazingness of a woman."

== Critical reception ==
Following its release, "I Am Woman" was well received by most music critics. Becky Bain of Idolator wrote "This somewhat experimental, hand-clapping, high energy woman-power track is the most bangin' thing we've heard from Jordin, well, maybe ever. It makes us want to strap on our stilettos and wobble-strut all over the dancefloor!." Nadine Cheung of AOL Radio Blog said the track shows a "new side" to Sparks, and added that she "sings with a feisty attitude, leaving her sweet disposition at the door." Jason Lipshutz of Billboard called it "empowering". James Dinh of MTV Newsroom wrote, "Sparks has taken to her music as a venue to rejoice in her coming-of-age growth and maturity".

Many critics also noted the song's similarities to the sounds of American R&B singer Beyoncé. A writer for WPLJ said "I Am Woman" "is a forceful dance track that's a female empowerment anthem very reminiscent of Beyoncé." Jarett Wieselman of New York Post, described the song as a "pre-teen version" of Beyoncé's "Run the World (Girls)" (2011). Gil Kaufman of MTV News called it a "Beyoncé-like R&B jam".

== Chart performance ==
For the issue dated May 19, 2011, "I Am Woman" debuted on the US Billboard Hot 100 at number eighty-two with 33,000 downloads sold. As of September 2014, the video has not been released.

== Live performances ==
On May 12, 2011, Sparks performed "I Am Woman" live for the first time on the tenth season of American Idol. She wore a silver metallic trench coat and black heels for the first half of the performance, and was accompanied by female back-up dancers. During the second half, Sparks removed the coat to reveal a black, body-skimming, dress, and the female dancers were replaced by male dancers. Sparks performed the song on Live With Regis and Kelly on June 14. "I Am Woman" was performed on the thirteenth season of Dancing with the Stars results show on November 8 by the women dancers of the show.

== Track listing ==
- Digital download
1. "I Am Woman" – 3:30

== Charts ==
Chart (2011)	Peak position
US Billboard Hot 100	82

== Radio and release history ==
List of release dates with formats and record labels
Country	Date	Format	Label
Belgium	May 17, 2011	Digital download	Sony Music
Canada	May 17, 2011	Digital download	Sony Music
Denmark	May 17, 2011	Digital download	Sony Music
Finland	May 17, 2011	Digital download	Sony Music
France	May 17, 2011	Digital download	Sony Music
Germany	May 17, 2011	Digital download	Sony Music
Ireland	May 17, 2011	Digital download	Sony Music
Netherlands	May 17, 2011	Digital download	Sony Music
New Zealand	May 17, 2011	Digital download	Sony Music
Norway	May 17, 2011	Digital download	Sony Music
Portugal	May 17, 2011	Digital download	Sony Music
Sweden	May 17, 2011	Digital download	Sony Music
United States	May 10, 2011	Digital download	Jive Records
United States	May 24, 2011	Mainstream radio	Jive Records
