= Dancing to the Music in My Head =

EP by Sanjaya Malakar
- Released: January 20, 2009
- Genre: Pop
- Label: The Label Record Company NY

Sanjaya Malakar chronology
American Idol Season 6: Greatest Hits (2007)	Dancing to the Music in My Head (2009)

Dancing to the Music in My Head is the independently released debut EP from former American Idol 6 finalist Sanjaya Malakar. It is Malakar's first recording since his stint on the show in 2007. Subsequently, the EP was released the same day as Malakar's memoir, titled Dancing to the Music in My Head: Memoirs of the People's Idol.

== Track listing ==
1. "A Guy Like Me"
2. "I Got It for You"
3. "A Quintessential Lullaby"
4. "Rainy Days"
5. "Tell Me Who I Am"
