= Yaminoys =

Filipino fans of Elliott Yamin

"Yaminoys" refer to the Filipino supporters of American singer Elliott Yamin. The author of the term—a combination of "Yamin" and "Pinoys," which is the colloquial label for "Filipinos"—remains a mystery, though it is widely believed that one of the regular posters at the "Filipino Elliott Fans" thread in Elliott's sub-forum at americanidol.com during American Idol Season 5, came up with the name.

== Early history ==
The Yaminoys thread transferred to Etrainstation.com when the latter was created on May 18, 2006. The Yaminoys Yahoo group was born ten days before that, with the initial goal of having 100 members; this was achieved in June 2006. At that point, members brainstormed on ways to make Elliott aware that he had an active fan base in the Philippines and convince him to come to the country for a concert. These included sending him a birthday gift, posting updates on his MySpace page regarding the status of the group, and coordinating with his marketing arm, the Croshal Entertainment Group, to ask for updates on when his debut and self-titled album would be available in the Philippines. The group would also request radio stations to play Elliott's first single "Wait For You" following its official release in the U.S., and track its status.

== Reaching Public Consciousness ==
The wider public became aware of the group during Elliott's concert tour in the Philippines in the latter part of September 2007. Aside from the tarpaulins welcoming Elliott to the Philippines and cheering him the loudest during his shows, the Yaminoys were noted for their "I (heart) EY" shirts, which followed the design of a similar top from New York City, except that the heart was in Elliott's favorite color, green. At the meet-and-greet session following Elliott's TriNoma show on September 21, some members of the group handed a "mini-me" Elliott doll, with the word "Yaminoys" on the figurine's shirt, to the singer-songwriter. Elliott put up a picture of the said replica on his MySpace profile section, soon afterwards.

== Elliott Yamin and the Yaminoys ==
Elliott acknowledged that, prior to his visit to the Philippines, he did not have an idea on the magnitude of his music's popularity in the country.

"I can't speak for all, but we never really know how big of a following we have and how big American Idol was outside the States," he said during a press conference in Glorietta mall in Makati a few hours after he arrived.

But he revealed being familiar with the world-renowned Filipino warmth.

"I have got some Filipino friends back home, people I have grown up with. I just know how warm and friendly the Filipino culture is. Everybody is so warm and so accepting. I'm just thrilled to be a part of it."

Among those friends is fellow American Idol Season 5 contestant Sway Peñala, who told him to expect royal treatment when he comes to the Philippines.

"To actually get here and to experience it first hand has been such an honor. It's been so amazing. And so far, everybody's been so warm and friendly. They just wanna see me do well and succeed. And it's just great. I'm just honored to be even asked to be here to be able to share my music with everybody here," Elliott said in an interview by Myx Mag.

During his shows, Elliott would give shout-outs to the Yaminoys, repeatedly calling them the warmest people in the world. He would also utter "mabuhay" and "salamat," two Tagalog words he learned in preparation for his tour.

When he came back to the U.S. and went on a nationwide tour there, Elliott would happily recount his experience in the Philippines:

"We got to play five shows there. We had the time of our lives. Everybody knows all the words to all the songs," the pop/soul/R&B artist told Houston Chronicle ahead of his show at the Meridian.

"It was great, to go halfway around the world and see how much love and support is out there. I was blown away by how much they know my music. They're very keen on 'American Idol.' They're 10 times more fanatical than people here . . . [We were there for] a music tour. We did five acoustic shows to help promote my record. My song ['Wait For You'] and video have been No. 1 over there for weeks and weeks and weeks . . . It was really awesome, man. Probably the best shows I've ever had in my life", Elliott said to Richmond Times-Dispatch.

"My experience was unforgettable, amazing. It was very eye-opening as to how powerful music is and how blessed I am to be a part of it. It was amazing to see how strong and how much that Filipinos admire American music and are so devoted to it. Some of the most loyal fans I've ever met, and I honestly can't wait to play a full show over there and do a full set with my band. I had an absolute blast and I would love to go back any day," the highly gifted singer said in response to a question during the live chat sponsored by Oscar Mayer to promote its "Sing the Jingle Be A Star" contest, in October 2007.

Elliot would occasionally mention the Yaminoys in his MySpace blogs. He dedicated his October 21, 2007 entry to his Filipino fans in the wake of the Glorietta blast, which occurred nearly a month after Elliott performed in that mall.

== Yaminoys Today ==
As of May 2008, those registered in the Yahoo group number more than 300. Their online presence has grown—the Yaminoys have Friendster, Multiply, and MySpace accounts. They also exchange views via PinoyExchange.com and a special forum at Etrainstation.com.

The Yaminoys hold meetings on occasion to discuss ways to increase airplay of Elliott's songs and sales of the American Idol alum's debut CD, which is distributed by MCA Music Philippines. Their efforts enabled four songs from "Elliott Yamin" -- "Wait For You," "Movin' On," "One Word," and "You Are The One"—to make the charts in several radio stations.

== Relevant Links ==
- Official Yaminoy Subforum at Etrainstation.com
- Yaminoys Yahoo group
- Yaminoys at Pinoyexchange.com
- Yaminoys at MySpace
- Yaminoys at Friendster
- Yaminoys at Multiply
