= Online health communities =

Type of Internet community

Online health communities (OHCs) are a type of online social network focused on health-related topics. They enable patients, caregivers, and health professionals to exchange information, share experiences, and provide social support. Participants may include individuals living with specific illnesses, medical professionals with shared clinical interests, non-professional caregivers, or a combination of these groups. The term is primarily used in academic and health informatics literature.

Increased internet access has coincided with greater use of online health information resources. Surveys of U.S. adults indicate that most internet users seek health-related information online, and that many individuals with medical conditions use online platforms to connect with others who share similar experiences.

OHCs may operate as standalone platforms or as interactive features within larger health information websites, including discussion forums and peer-support networks. Depending on the structure of the community, participants may share personal illness experiences, exchange knowledge and information about treatments, and discuss disease-specific concerns.

Research has examined the use of OHCs among individuals with conditions such as cancer, HIV/Aids, infertility, diabetes, and other rare diseases. Studies describe these communities as venues for the exchange of informational and emotional support. Research has also identified the presences highly active members in online health communities, sometimes referred to as 'superusers', who are associated with patterns of engagement within these communities .

OHCs differ from static health information websites in that they facilitate interactive communication among users. They vary in scope, membership structure, and accessibility, ranging from open public forums to moderated or condition-specific networks.

== History ==
With the invention of email for ARPANET in 1972, communication through a computer to distant geographies became substantially easier. Listservs, which allow a multitude of respondents to interact with an email thread and Bulletin Boards, an online representation of the community bulletin boards commonly found on campuses, were introduced contemporary with one another. These three tools along with USENET provided the tools for rudimentary online communities to begin to coalesce around health related topics.

In 1991 CERN labs introduced the World Wide Web, allowing a more graphical representation of the topic to be discussed. This change lessened barriers to communication and enhanced community building. For example, the growth potential from linear to geometric was made possible through this change primarily because audiences could access static content more easily without the author's knowledge or synchronicity in time. Furthermore, the graphical nature of the World Wide Web made the exchange of medically relevant information more easily possible. Lastly, the widespread use of the World Wide Web in PC's made during the mid-1990s made the technology available to a much wider audience than previous technologies. By 1997, the World Wide Web was the predominant medium for ad hoc online health communities to form.

Even more, with the evolution of Web 2.0 functionality and Internet penetration during the 2000s, web-based programs became increasingly utilized as a mechanism by which to incorporate social, interactive, and guided behavior change processes. Many of these behaviors for patients and medical providers increasingly centered around the exchange or health-based information.

As these communities emerged, more and more research was conducted assessing their benefits, complications, and other features. Much of this research has supported their beneficial aspects. As a result of these benefits, medical health organizations increasingly began including online health communities as part of their patient support services. Examples of these organizations include Kaiser Permanente, Johns Hopkins, Cleveland Medical Center, and MD Anderson Cancer Center. Currently, online health networks run by both private companies, public hospitals, and even decentralized social groups are a regular part of the illness experience for many individuals.

== Benefits ==
The importance of online health communities is evidenced by their popularity, as well as the significant impact they have on the lives of their members. That said, there is limited consensus on best practices in online health community design, and research on the benefits of online health communities is slightly limited. Despite that lack of extensive research on its benefits, there are still many situations where online health communities appear to aid patients and medical professionals. Additionally, many of these benefits are seen within specific illnesses, and are most beneficial for certain individuals, and would be otherwise unattainable outside of the context of online health communities.

=== Psychological benefits ===
There are multiple psychological constructs that are shown to benefit from online health communities. This list identifies various beneficial outcomes from the most frequently studies constructs.

==== Social support ====
Across a variety of chronic and acute illnesses, online health communities have shown a positive effect on social support. This support can be beneficial to patients in a number of ways, such as helping them adjust to the stress of a particular condition. Support is also a consistent indicator of survival for many conditions. Patients interact with others in online health communities in a number of different ways. As a result, various types of social support occur in communities. When users are seeking advice, education, or referrals about a certain condition or experience, they receive informational support. Alternatively, when users are seeking things like encouragement, empathy, affirmation, or validation, they receive emotional support. Finally, when users are engaging in behaviors such as chatting or humor, they receive support in the form of companionship.

==== Disease knowledge ====
Patients who utilize online health networks often experience increases in knowledge specific to the disease or condition that they are dealing with. This increased disease knowledge can help patients make more informed decisions about their health.

==== Perceived empathy ====
Patients show increased perceptions of empathy as a result of information seeking behavior on online health communities. In general, perceptions of empathy are shown to have potential benefits for impacting the success of health care treatment, as well as the healing process. Furthermore, traditional medical provider empathy is costly and time-consuming. Perceptions of empathy from online health communities can act as a feasible replacement for provider empathy.

=== Behavioral benefits ===
Online health communities not only can have psychological benefits, but they can also have benefits for health behaviors.

==== Treatment adherence ====
Patients who use online health communities may also see increased adherence to health treatments. Given the resources such as social support that these communities provide, they are more able to manage the tasks and responsibilities that their treatment requires.

==== Self management ====
Traditionally, patients are not well-equipped to manage their own illnesses. The resources that online health communities provide cut down on the need for in-person visits with medical professionals and allow patients to address many low level health issues on their own.

=== Institutional benefits ===
Beyond the effects that online health communities can have on specific psychological and behavioral outcomes in various illnesses, there are several other broad benefits that they can provide to the institution and structure of health care.

==== Interdisciplinary collaboration ====
For medical professionals, online health communities can be valuable tools to help foster interdisciplinary collaboration across various institutions. This collaboration can help medical professionals provide more diverse and beneficial care to patients.

==== Medical professional knowledge ====
In online health communities composed of medical professionals, participation can lead to increased exchange of medical information, as well as the adoption of disease specific knowledge that can be used to inform treatment and other medical decisions.

==== Patient centered care ====
Patient centered care is a health care strategy that is focused on engaging patients to become more active participants in their health care. The use of this strategy has shown to improve the efficiency of care, patient-doctor communication, treatment compliance, health outcomes, and decrease overall health care utilization. Through improved access to personalized information, patient participation, and emotional support, online health communities promote patient centered care practices.

==== Health care utilization ====
At current rates, the number of patients who need specialized health care is growing more rapidly than the supply of well-trained professionals who can address these needs. As a result, current utilization rates of health care resources is much higher than is manageable. However, implementations of online health communities are shown to result in a reduction of traditional in-person health care utilization.

==== Health care cost ====
In parallel with increased health care utilization, the cost of providing health care also continues to rise and may become unaffordable as a result of advancement cost and over treatment. Similarly, implementations of online health communities have resulted in both health care cost reductions.

=== Illness benefits ===
There are a wide variety of online health communities. Some of these communities target vary specific conditions, while other are more open ended. That said, patients with certain conditions are shown to specifically benefit from these communities. Broadly, patients with conditions that are more rare or severe may garner stronger benefits given that the online health communities can provide resources they would likely not get elsewhere. More specifically, benefits of these communities have been seen in a variety of conditions such as cancer, HIV/Aids, infertility, diabetes, and other rare illnesses.

=== Social medical capital benefits ===
Participation in online health communities not only provides users with emotional and informational support but also helps them expand their social networks. These communities enable individuals to form connections with others who share similar health experiences, fostering a sense of belonging and mutual understanding. These social bonds can extend beyond health-related discussions, enriching users' overall social lives and contributing to their emotional well-being. Social medical capital is defined as the advantages that any user can gain from participation in the social networks provided by online health communities. From a network-based perspective, social medical capital is rooted in resources socially embedded in connections between users and accessible through these connections. This means not only that users can benefit from one another, but also that whether they can extract value from one another depends on how they interact.

Key role of superusers: Superusers—highly active members—play a pivotal role in sustaining online health communities (OHCs). In the Asthma UK and British Lung Foundation communities, superusers represented just 1% of users but generated more than one-third of all posts. Their consistent contributions foster community cohesion, facilitate connections, and provide emotional and informational support, which enhance patient outcomes and promote active participation. A study in which superusers in the Asthma UK OHC were interviewed found that the superusers' participation was prompted by curiosity about asthma and its medical treatment, and by having the spare time available to participate when they were off work due to asthma exacerbations or had retired from work. Their engagement increased over time as participants furthered their familiarity with the OHCs and their knowledge of asthma and its self-management. Financial or social recognition of the superuser role was not important; their reward came from helping and interacting with others.

Strengthened social networks: Participation in OHCs fosters strong social networks that play a crucial role in reducing feelings of loneliness and isolation, especially for individuals managing long-term conditions. Members benefit from emotional support, validation, and a sense of belonging gained through shared experiences with others facing similar challenges. Superusers significantly enhance these networks by providing consistent peer support through advice, shared knowledge, and empathetic interactions. Their contributions not only create a supportive environment, but also empower other members by improving their knowledge of how to manage their condition, and building confidence in their self-care abilities. This collaborative dynamic reinforces the sustainability of the network, enabling participants to transition from seeking help to giving it, while also driving better health outcomes and adherence to treatment plans.

Network diversity and weak ties: A qualitative study of individuals managing chronic respiratory conditions, such as asthma and COPD, suggested that both online and offline social networks contribute significantly to effective self-management. Diverse networks, including connections with family, friends, and online community members were associated with greater access to emotional and informational resources. Participants reported that online communities provided unique perspectives and support, particularly during periods of isolation, such as hospitalization or lockdowns (during the COVID-19 pandemic). These online interactions complemented offline relationships, creating a comprehensive network of support. The study also highlighted the critical role of weak ties—connections with less familiar individuals—which offered novel information and strategies for managing illnesses. Such interactions enriched participants' networks, enhancing their self-efficacy and ability to manage their conditions effectively.

=== Who benefits most? ===
While online health communities can provide general benefits. There are also particular individuals who may benefit most from them. In particular, online health communities are especially beneficial when they are used in a way that allows for connections and resources that would otherwise be unavailable. For example, while members of an online health community may know one another, a real strength and benefit of them is that they can connect people who would have otherwise been unable to do so. There are certain individuals who may have smaller in-person networks who can adequately address their medical needs. Therefore, for these individuals, online health networks may be particularly beneficial. Specifically, the availability of online health communities is especially appreciated by individuals with impaired mobility, potentially embarrassing medical conditions, or caretaker responsibilities that may prohibit them from receiving adequate face-to-face medical and emotional support.

Beyond this, there are several factors that have been identified for evaluating patient experiences with online health communities and evaluating who they benefit. The four main dimensions that contribute to a patient's experience with online health communities include: pragmatic, empathic, sociability, and usability. The pragmatic dimension refers to the goals of a user, and if the use of the community aids achievement of those goals. The empathic dimension refers to the feelings and emotions of empathy that are felt when interacting with the community. The sociability dimension refers to the overall social experience that a patient feels when interacting with the community. Finally, the usability dimension refers to the experience a patient has when navigating the features of the community. Together these features can help identify for which patients and on what platforms the largest benefits will be seen.

== Complications ==
Despite the benefits that online health communities may provide, there are also several complications that they may pose.

=== Misinformation ===
Given that one of the primary uses of online health communities is the exchange of health information between untrained individuals. In many cases, people do not use the best judgment when sharing and relying on information in online communities, but the consequences of poor information depends on what the information is and how it is used. Medical information can have grave consequences when poor advice is taken or is erroneously applied; or when professional treatment is not sought. The criticality of health-related information necessitates careful consideration of how to design for usability and sociability. Furthermore, patients and their families may be under stress and the emotional burden, which can diminish health literacy, necessitates more careful design and evaluation. In addition, disease and illness have no boundaries, and participants in online health communities can vary considerably in their medical expertise, health literacy, and technological literacy, as well as in their need for education and support about a disease or condition. To combat misinformation in these communities, some communities have incorporated health experts to moderate content for accuracy. While such steps may be beneficial, they also hold their own implications for community dynamics.

=== Trust and safety ===
The sharing of any personal information within a community is often impacted by the level of trust those community members have for each other. Distributing personal information can have many consequences if it is not handled properly. Not only does it decrease ones security, but it can also threaten their safety. In in-person communities, trust is often predictably built over time, and can lead to the open exchange of valuable personal details that can facilitate the exchange of support and other resources. However, in online health communities, many individuals do not know each other personally, and also perceive their health information as a very personal and private subject. For people to receive the benefits discussed previously, they need to over come this barrier in online health networks and build a strong feeling of trust. Within these networks, potential factors that contribute to feelings of cognitive and affective trust include perspective taking, self-efficacy, and network density.

=== Adoption and engagement ===
There has been a wide and rapid adoption of online health communities from patient populations. However, some of the greatest benefits are realized when these communities also are utilized by medical professionals. For patients, there is a clear incentive to increase information, support, and care through these communities. However, there is less of an incentive for medical providers to participate. Doctors can be slow to adopt technologies that deviate or disrupt their regular patterns for providing care. The additional time and responsibility commitments and significant barriers to adoption of these communities for medical providers.

Furthermore, a common issue with online health communities is a lack of engagement from those with medical conditions, even after they have decided to adopt the technology. Users often don't feel they have an obligation to share or create new content, even if they consume content from other individuals. Two major reasons for this behavior are (1) a lack of social responsibility to contribute, and (2) concern about how other may perceive them if they did decide to contribute. Several options for addressing this are shown to be effective. For example, if people are paired with an online "buddy" as part of the larger community, they are more likely to contribute as it can help give a larger sense of social responsibility. Nevertheless, driving adoption and engagement is a major hurtle for many online health communities.

=== Accessibility ===
For the benefits of online health communities to accrue, systems must be developed that are accessible, welcoming, easy to navigate and use, and able to help members discern information quality and interact with other participants in meaningful ways. The successful design of such systems will be facilitated by collaborations among clinicians, informed designers, and patients. Health professionals and patients can help explain the physical and emotional stages that individuals go through once they are diagnosed with a particular disease. Furthermore, health professionals understand the risks of misinformation and the role that health care providers need to play. Patients understand the practical information about coping with a disease and the importance of social support and empathy. Designers and developers are needed to understand and explain the technological options available to online health communities and the implications of specific design choices. Such collaborations are needed to explore topics on which there seems to be no prevailing wisdom, such as how the nature of the disease or illness impacts the online health community design; how to improve health literacy; and which of the many collaborative technologies that are available best support peer interaction. Finally, it is important to track and evaluate new technologies, such as Web 2.0, to understand when and how to deploy technologies that assist in and improve peer health communication. At the same time, access and effective use by others may be restricted due to cultural, language, and other issues.

== Participation ==
An obvious factor for any online community is managing user participation, engagement, and behavior. Different people have different experiences with online health communities, which can lead to differing impacts and implications. Some individuals show high engagement, while others are more passive in their use (lurkers). Understandably, individuals who showed much higher levels of engagement reap the highest benefits in outcomes such as emotional support, help giving, and emotional expression. That said, even lurkers can see some beneficial level of peer support from the online communities.

Beyond the extent to which people participate in these communities, there is also a distinction in the type of engagement that is seen by those who actively participate. Some individuals more frequently share general health information such as hospital information, drug side effects, and health behaviors. Whereas, other individuals choose to share more specific knowledge such as their private health information. Private information can be more valuable for other patients. However, it is also much more difficult to share than general knowledge. Regardless of the type of knowledge being shared, reputation, social support and sense of self-worth all were associated with more sharing. Furthermore, face concern, which is the extent to which a person values the protection and improvement his or her positive social image, promotes general knowledge sharing and inhibits private sharing. Emotions, time, and effort are some of the largest barriers to providing private knowledge. Beyond these factors, there are also various other structural factors that may impact community participation and engagement.

In some online health communities, health experts are incorporated as moderators in order to provide people with accurate clinical knowledge. Inclusion and participation from moderators can help create a more empathic community culture. However, the inclusion of moderators can also give users feelings of inequality if posts do not receive equal responses. In addition, determining which post need clinical expertise, and which would suffice with community expertise is not an easy task, and can cause further issues. From this, when users do receive a response it can mislead them about what kind of consultation they are receiving.

While moderators are often put into place to help guide the conversation and flow of information in these communities, there are also users that occasionally adopt this role naturally. These influential users have accumulated the power to drastically influence other users and the community as a whole. For example, influential users can help build and manage a community, provide marketing, initiate community driven campaigns, and disseminate information.

While these factors help explain the experience and participation of users during a very particular point in their lives, there are also several factors to consider about the experience of patients who stop using or participating in these communities over time. Based on the benefits that these communities can offer, removing yourself from them could stifle the beneficial effects. There are numerous reasons for why someone might stop participating in a community, such as a lack of need, a poor experience, or a failure of a sites design. However, some argue that oftentimes these situations are caused by a logical progression of life changes as a given person's experience with his or her condition evolves. Regardless of the reasons for leaving, both the participation and non-participation of a communities members is a very important factor to consider, as it has strong implications for the overall success of the community.

== Integration with healthcare systems ==
A recent UK study developed a primary care intervention designed to promote patient engagement with an established and nurse-moderated online health community for asthma. This research study, conducted with primary care patients and clinicians in London, developed a structured consultation process to introduce patients to the Asthma+Lung UK online asthma community. The study also highlighted the need to address digital literacy barriers and ensure consistent patient engagement. The intervention is currently undergoing feasibility testing, with plans for a subsequent randomised controlled trial. Promoting the use of OHCs within primary care settings introduces unique ethical and governance challenges. Critical issues include: ensuring data privacy; obtaining informed consent; and addressing the potential risks of clinician involvement in OHC promotion. Interventions need to be co-designed with stakeholders, offering tailored support and clear communication about data usage to maintain patient trust and enhance engagement with these digital platforms. Such considerations are vital for the successful integration of OHCs into healthcare systems to improve patient outcomes without compromising ethical standards.

== Forms ==
As mentioned previously, these communities are distinct from general online communities in that they focus exclusively on health-related topics for those currently navigating the world of diseases, illness, and medicine. Furthermore, they also differ from other health-related sites that only allow users to retrieve information. The main hallmark of these communities is that they allow for communication between multiple people. That said, they can take a variety of forms, and vary drastically in their scope.

These online health communities can be formed across numerous different types of communication platforms such as blogs, chats, forums, wikis, and social media sites. As long as people are able to communicate with each other over the internet about medical conditions, any given communication platform can be used to create an online health community. Beyond the platform used, communities can also vary in terms of how open and accessible they are. Some communities are open and public to anyone who is interested, while others are very private. Furthermore, some communities focus on multiple conditions, while other focus primarily on one. Finally, the target user population can also differ between networks. For example, some communities are targeted towards older adults, while others are exclusively for adolescents.

== Features ==
In terms of functionality, there are several primary features that most online health communities possess. The primary feature that most online health networks have are those that support social learning and networking. Communication is at the core of these communities. This communication can take the form of both one-to-one communication and one-to-many communication. Oftentimes they feature discussions on practical problems faced by people during their condition such as depression, side-effects of medications, etc. and answers to those problems provided by other members.

Another feature type that most online health committees have are those that allow for information distribution. These features often can take the form of a blog, news area, staff-written articles, or even a regularly scheduled email newsletter. These features can allow for the exchange of important information such as recommendations and feedback about certain medications or medical procedures.

A third common feature type are those that allow for guidance. These guidance features often take advantage of the one-to-one and one-to-many communication features mentioned previously. Some communities have specific features that facilitate guidance from medical professionals, while others provide specific tailored mentoring or coaching.

While less common, a fourth feature types that is sometime available in online health communities are those that are designed to drive more user engagement. Examples of these kinds of features include features such as gamification or social recognition.

Finally, another less common feature type are those that allow for the sharing of personal health information. Some community sites allow users to enter or upload specific health information, and share that with other users. This type of feature may raise some privacy and safety concerns for some, which may be why it is not as prevalent as some of the common features.

=== Example communities ===
- Smart Patients
- PatientsLikeMe
- HealthBoards
- MedHelp
- DailyStrength
- WebMD
- GiveForward
- HealthUnlocked
- Inspire

== See also ==
- Diabetes Hands Foundation (Social Networking)
- Community health
