= Fight for Love =

Fight for Love may refer to:

- A Fight for Love, a 1919 silent film starring Harry Carey
- Fight for Love (54-40 album), the group's 1989 album
- Fight for Love (Elliott Yamin album), the artist's 2009 album
  - "Fight for Love" (Elliott Yamin song), the lead single from the album of the same name
- "Fight for Love", a song by Babyface from his 2015 album Return of the Tender Lover
- "Fight for Love" (Courtney Act song), released in 2018
- Fight for Love (TV series), a Hong Kong modern serial drama
- Youngblood (1986 film), an American sports drama film released as Fight for Love in the Philippines in 1992
- Blood in Dispute, a 2015 Philippine-Cambodian film released as Fight for Love in the Philippines
