= Paul Nguyen =

Paul Nguyen may refer to:

- Paul Nguyen (filmmaker), Canadian filmmaker, politician, and activist
- Paul L. Nguyen, American radiation oncologist and researcher
- Paul Lê Nguyễn, Vietnamese swimmer
- Paul Nguyễn Công Anh, Righteous Among the Nations Vietnamese national
- Paul Nguyễn Thanh Hoan, Vietnamese Roman Catholic bishop who served the Roman Catholic Diocese of Phan Thiết
- Paul Nguyễn Văn Hòa, Vietnamese Roman Catholic bishop who served the Roman Catholic Diocese of Nha Trang
- Paul Nguyễn Văn Bình, first Archbishop of Saigon
