= Inspire (company) =

American social network

- Logo of the company Inspire.
- Website type: Social networking service
- Available in: English
- Creators: Brian Loew; Amir Lewkowicz; Walter Wlodarczyk
- Website: inspire.com
- Registration: Yes
- Users: 2,000,000 (2020)
- Launched: January 2005; 21 years ago (as Clinica Health)
- Current status: Active

Inspire is an Arlington, Virginia-based healthcare social network. It builds and manages online health communities for patients and caregivers, and connects patients to life science companies for the purpose of research.

== Overview ==
Founded in 2005, the company serves millions of patients and caregivers in several hundred online support groups. As of the end of 2020, Inspire had more than two million registered members. These online groups are mostly organized around a single condition, such as psoriasis, ovarian cancer, or lung cancer.

Online health communities like Inspire are referenced as components of the empowered patient, or e-patient movement.

== History ==
Brian Loew founded Inspire. It was first known as ClinicaHealth until March 2008. In 2022, the Inspire community had over 2.5 million registered members, more than 40% of whom are affected by cancer. Inspire had about 80,000 members in 2008.

Early employees include Amir Lewkowicz, Walter Wlodarczyk, Beth McNaughton, and contributors Nate Shue and David Marshall.

== Partnerships with nonprofit advocacy organizations ==
Inspire partners with multiple nonprofit patient advocacy organizations, such as the Bladder Cancer Advocacy Network, National Osteoporosis Foundation, American Lung Association, Ovarian Cancer Research Alliance, Genetic Alliance, Kidney Cancer Association, Scleroderma Foundation, Alzheimer's Foundation of America, Tuberous Sclerosis Alliance, Men's Health Network, WomenHeart: The National Coalition for Women with Heart Disease, ThyCa: Thyroid Cancer Survivors' Association, American Liver Foundation, Lupus Foundation of America, Encephalitis Global, Neurofibromatosis Network, American Sexual Health Association, Ehlers-Danlos Society, and the ALS Association to provide online communities for the nonprofit organizations.

== Products and services ==
Inspire generates company revenue from market research and promotional services to pharmaceutical companies. Inspire's market research services include online surveys, user-generated content analysis, and moderated online private research communities.

Examples of promotional projects that Inspire would provide on behalf of a pharmaceutical client include branded or unbranded banner ads that Inspire serves in its online communities and the delivery of targeted, permission-based emails to community members.

== Research projects ==
Healthcare companies and institutions have worked with Inspire on research projects that focus on rare disease populations or populations of patients who have advanced disease, such as metastatic lung cancer.

In October 2020, Precision Oncology News, a publication owned by GenomeWeb, detailed a research project involving Inspire, Pfizer and Boston Children's Hospital. The article stated how Stefan McDonough, executive director of genetics at Pfizer, described the Inspire platform as "an extraordinary resource" because patients are already appropriately consented and are eager to share their medical information to advance treatments. "I would be wearing out multiple sets of shoes going from investigator to investigator, clinician to clinician" to collect this sort of patient data, McDonough was quoted as saying.

Earlier in 2020, Inspire data was cited in a BJU International research paper about the effect of prostate cancer on sleep.

In January 2021, Marina Ness, Inspire's Director of Research, was an author on a paper in European Urology Open Science, the Open Access journal of the European Urology family.

In November 2019, Inspire teamed with Mayo Clinic on a Journal of Medical Internet Research study involving the use of statins, and memory loss.

Earlier in 2019, an Inspire researcher was an author on a Journal of Medical Internet Research paper with researchers from the Food and Drug Administration. Also in 2019, Inspire collaborated with Isabelle Boutron, a professor of epidemiology at the Paris Descartes University and head of the INSERM- METHODS team within the Centre of Research in Epidemiology and Statistics (CRESS), on BioMed Central," a study about "spin" in healthcare news.

In April 2018, an Inspire data scientist was an author of a Nature Genetics correspondence about ways to close the"terminology gap" between medical professionals and patients. Also in 2018, Inspire collaborated with ProPublica and Memorial Sloan Kettering Cancer Center in research that led to a paper in the Journal of Oncology Practice.

Earlier that year, JAMA Oncology published a research letter, based on research involving Stanford University and Inspire. National Public Radio (NPR) reported on the Stanford/Inspire study with the article, How Social Media Can Reveal Overlooked Drug Reactions.

In 2015, members of Inspire's lung cancer group self-organized and submitted a request that helped changed treatment guidelines from the National Comprehensive Cancer Network (NCCN).

Health technology industry executive John Glaser cited Inspire in an industry magazine column citing the importance of healthcare social networks to clinical research. "In addition to helping patients find and take advantage of clinical trials, health care social networks also provide an opportunity for participant-led research," Glaser wrote, "in which members initiate new fields of study. For instance, Inspire members with spontaneous coronary artery dissection persuaded researchers at the Mayo Clinic to launch new research into the condition, which led to the creation of a SCAD registry, a key step in the further study of this rare disease. Indeed, there is tremendous potential for online patient communities to contribute to the project of a continuously learning health system."

== Awards and recognition ==
In December 2020, the nonprofit organization the Invisible Disabilities Association honored Brian Loew with the 2020 Corporate Award for his dedication to patient advocacy organizations.

The Washington Post profiled Loew in April 2017 around the time Inspire's membership surpassed one million patients and caregivers. The article states, "Loew and his company are attached to the surge of patient assertiveness, with more people questioning their health care and taking more of the responsibility out of the hands of professionals."

Brian Loew has been named to PharmaVOICE magazine's "PharmaVOICE 100" three times, in 2014, 2016 and 2017, for his contributions to the life sciences industry." As of 2020, Loew sits on the boards of directors of the Robert Packard Center for ALS Research at Johns Hopkins, and New Jersey Goals of Care.

The Mayo Clinic named Amir Lewkowicz as a keynote speaker at its Healthcare Social Media Summit 2016 in Melbourne, Australia.
