= One Word (disambiguation) =

"One Word" is a 2005 song by Kelly Osbourne

One Word may also refer to:

- "One Word" (Baby Animals song), 1992
- "One Word" (Elliott Yamin song), 2007
- "One Word", a 1982 song by Anya Major
- "One Word", by The Grass Roots, from the 1972 album Move Along

== See also ==
- Oneword, a British radio station
- One (word)
