= Fight for Love (Elliott Yamin song) =

Single by Elliott Yamin

from the album Fight for Love
- Released: March 10, 2009
- Genre: Pop, R&B, Neo-soul
- Length: 3:34 (Radio Edit); 3:48 (Radio Edit with Intro)
- Label: RED Distribution, Hickory Records
- Songwriter: Johntá Austin
- Producers: Johntá Austin, Theodore Thomas

Elliott Yamin singles chronology
"One Word" (2007)	"Fight for Love" (2009)	""Can't Keep on Loving You (From A Distance)""

"Fight for Love" is a song by American pop singer (former American Idol finalist) Elliott Yamin. It is the title track and first single from his second album, Fight for Love. The song was released for streaming to AOL Music on February 13, 2009 and for adds at Top 40 (CHR) and Rhythmic radio on March 10, 2009. It also became available for download at digital music outlets on March 10 in two versions - with or without piano introduction.

== Song information ==
Yamin describes the song:

"'Fight for Love' epitomizes what the record is really about --it’s about love and fighting for it, with it, in it and out of it. I love the lyrics. It’s a feel-good song that's very relatable. Everyone has been through a broken heart before and later found someone better -- someone worthy of fighting for."

== Video ==
The video for "Fight for Love" premiered on AOL Music on May 1, 2009. AOL Music’s PopEater blog describes it as “what might be the world's coolest scavenger hunt”. The video intercuts scenes of Yamin singing as he descends an ornate staircase with scenes of a young woman receiving a series of cards that lead her to an encounter with a magician (Farrell Dillon) and a breakdancer (one of the members of SuperCr3w) and concludes at the Los Angeles Theater. The theater marquee displays “Fight for Love”. Alone in the theater auditorium, the woman reads the last of the cards and turns to find Yamin and his band onstage performing for her. She smiles in joyful recognition and the contents of the cards are revealed to the viewer in flashbacks: each card contains romantic lyrics from the song. The video was directed by Nick Spanos, who also directed the video for Yamin's hit "Wait for You".

== Reception ==
The song received a positive review from Alex Vitoulis of Billboard:

"I'm ecstatic, I feel the magic," are the opening lines that encapsulate the spirit of the lead single from the season-five "American Idol" finalist's second album. Co-written by R&B hitmaker Johnta Austin (Mary J. Blige, Mariah Carey) and Theodore Thomas, Yamin's soulful delivery demonstrates that he is no one-hit wonder. Soaring over a laid-back, smooth R&B beat, his vocals capture the essence of being in love. This gem is already resonating with listeners at top 40 and should have no problem snugly settling in at AC. R&B radio should also take notice: This is a guy who held his own duetting with Blige on "Idol," and he shows those chops here.

== Charts ==
Chart (2009)	Peak position
U.S. Billboard Pop 100	80
