= Nicolas Huỳnh Văn Nghi =

Vietnamese Catholic prelate (1927-2015)

The Most Reverend Nicolas Huỳnh Văn Nghi
- Bishop Emeritus of Phan Thiết
- Province: Sài Gòn
- See: Phan Thiết
- Installed: 6 December 1979
- Term ended: 1 April 2005
- Predecessor: Paul Nguyễn Văn Hòa
- Successor: Paul Nguyễn Thanh Hoan
- Previous posts: Bishop of Phan Thiết (1979–2005); Apostolic Administrator of Phan Thiết (1975–1979); Auxiliary Bishop of Saigon (1974–1975)

Orders
- Ordination: 29 June 1953
- Consecration: 11 August 1974 by Agnelo Rossi

Personal details
- Born: 1 May 1927 Saigon, French Cochinchina
- Died: 6 May 2015 (aged 88) Phan Thiết, Vietnam
- Denomination: Roman Catholic
- Motto: Deus caritas est (Vietnamese: Thiên Chúa là Tình Yêu, English: God is Love)

Nicolas Huỳnh Văn Nghi (1 May 1927 – 6 May 2015) was a Vietnamese Catholic prelate. He was Bishop of Phan Thiết from 1974 to 2005.

== Biography ==
Born in Vĩnh Hội, Saigon, he was sent to the Issy-les-Moulineaux Seminary in France to complete his studies and was ordained a priest in June 1953 at Notre-Dame de Paris cathedral. He then returned to teach in his native country and was named pastor of Gò Vấp Parish (1961-1965) and Tân Định Parish (1965-1974).

On 1 July 1974, the Holy See appointed him Auxiliary Bishop of Saigon (present-day Ho Chi Minh City). On 11 August 1974, at the Notre-Dame Saigon, he was ordained Titular Bishop of Selsea by Cardinal Agnelo Rossi, Prefect of the Congregation for the Evangelization of Peoples. On 19 March 1975, Father Nicolas was appointed Apostolic Administrator of the Diocese of Phan Thiết. In 1979, he was officially appointed as Bishop of Phan Thiết.

In 1993, he was named Apostolic Administrator of the Archdiocese of Ho Chi Minh City, due to poor health condition and then death of Archbishop Paul Nguyễn Văn Bình, until the installation of Archbishop Jean-Baptiste Phạm Minh Mẫn in 1998. On 1 April 2005, Bishop Nicolas resigned due to age limit, and was succeeded by Paul Nguyễn Thanh Hoan. He died on 6 May 2015, five days after his 88th birthday, at the Bishop's Residence in Phan Thiết.
