= Elliott Yamin (album) =

Studio album by Elliott Yamin
- Released: March 20, 2007
- Studios: The Playhouse Studios and Pulse Recording (Los Angeles, California); Firehouse Studios (Pasadena, California); Battery Studios, Chung King Studios and Mojo Studios (New York City, New York); Soapbox Studios (Atlanta, Georgia)
- Length: 41:57
- Label: Hickory
- Producers: Josh Abraham; Busbee; DJ Lethal; Michael Mangini; Stargate

Elliott Yamin chronology
Elliott Yamin (2007)	Fight for Love (2009)

Singles from Elliott Yamin
- 1. "Wait for You" Released: March 13, 2007; 2. "One Word" Released: October 16, 2007; 3. "Movin' On" Released: 2007

Elliott Yamin is the debut studio album by American singer Elliott Yamin. It was released on March 20, 2007, through Hickory Records, while distribution was overseen by Sony BMG-owned RED Distribution. Yamin, an American Idol finalist, collaborated with Sony/ATV Music Publishing to write, produce, and market the record. Collaborators include Josh Abraham, Busbee, DJ Lethal, Michael Mangini, and Stargate. The album includes 11 tracks, although several bonus tracks are offered at different retailers.

The album debuted at number three on the US Billboard 200 and topped the Independent Albums chart. In October 2007, it was certified gold by the Recording Industry Association of America in the United States. Elliott Yamin spawned three singles, including "Wait for You", "One Word" and promotional single "Movin' On." To promote the record, Yamin went on a world tour across North America and Southeast Asia that consisted of clubs, small theatres and radio-station holiday shows.

== Background and development ==
Yamin commented on the album that his "main thing was that I wanted to write some songs on this, and wanted to make sure that we got some music out to the vast fan base that I've established through Idol. A lot of people have been getting antsy, anticipating some music from me. We've really tried to focus on getting it out to the fans while not compromising any style or integrity. He further described the CD as "a vocally driven mix of R&B/pop crossover material with hints of blues and a few club-bangers."

== Promotion ==
Previews of four songs were made available on AOL Music First Listen on February 13, 2007: pre-album promo single "Movin' On", a full version of his acclaimed cover of "A Song for You", a love song titled "You are the One", and "Find a Way". The radio premiere of the first official single, "Wait for You", was on March 1, 2007, on KIIS-FM. The song was released to online music services, including iTunes, on March 13, 2007. Yamin promoted the album during 2007 with a nine-month tour of clubs, small theaters and radio-station holiday shows across the United States, plus shows in Canada, the Philippines, and Malaysia.

The album was released in Japan on May 21, 2008, by Avex Trax. This version was retitled Wait for You and includes "In Love with You Forever" and "Believe" as bonus tracks. On October 8, 2008, a Premium Edition of the album was released in Japan, including 2 more tracks: "A Whiter Shade of Pale" and "I'll Make You Dance", plus Yamin's cover of "Home", originally by Japanese singer Yusaku Kiyama, who recorded a Japanese version of "Wait for You" in return.

== Critical reception ==
Professional ratings
Review scores
Source	Rating
About.com	4/5 stars
AllMusic	3/5 stars
Entertainment Weekly	B
USA Today	2/4 stars

Daniel Wolfe of About.com praised both the genre variety on the record's track list and Yamin's vocal talents over them, saying that, "Whether it is his transcendent vocal on the choir-backed "Free" or his show-stopping cover of Leon Russell's "A Song for You," Elliott Yamin proves on his debut album that he is one of the most talented recording artists American Idol has produced." In a dual review with Paris Bennett's Princess P, Vibe writer Sean Fennessey noted how Yamin maintains his vocal identity when performing traditional tracks and the album's more "vibrant and modern" material. Entertainment Weekly's Dave Karger explained that to get the most out of the record, you have to approach it like a different episode of American Idol.

AllMusic's Stephen Thomas Erlewine was mixed about the album, noting how the tracks can be hit or miss at times with either misplaced styles or manufactured production but gave praise to Yamin's performance for having enough personality to sell the lyrics, saying that "He still sounds effortless and charming, which is why it's a shame he doesn't have the support he would have had if had won Idol: he would have had the biggest budget and the best collaborators, something that would help him make a record as distinctive as he is." Elysa Gardner of USA Today found the album to be a typical Idol release with adequate but generic tracks that are competently performed by Yamin's technically sound delivery, saying that "To his credit, he apes Stevie Wonder and Donny Hathaway as adroitly as Taylor Hicks does Michael McDonald. If that passes for interpretive singing these days, we have Idol, and ourselves, to blame."

== Commercial performance ==
Elliott Yamin debuted at number three on the US Billboard 200 chart, selling 90,000 copies in its first week of release. It was certified gold by the Recording Industry Association of America (RIAA) on October 12, 2007. By March 2010, the album had sold 527,000 copies in the United States. In Japan, the album was certified gold by the Recording Industry Association of Japan (RIAJ) in September 2008.

== Track listing ==
Elliott Yamin track listing
No.	Title	Writer(s)	Producer(s)	Length
1.	"Movin' On"	Leor Dimant; Oliver Goldstein; Ely Weisfeld; Elliott Yamin	Josh Abraham; DJ Lethal	3:41
2.	"Wait for You"	Taj Jackson; Mikkel S. Ericksen; Tor Erik Hermansen	Stargate	4:21
3.	"Find a Way"	Tony Reyes; Weisfeld; Yamin	Abraham; DJ Lethal	3:42
4.	"One Word"	Jackson; Espen Lind; Amund Bjørklund; Ericksen; Hermansen	Stargate; Espionage^{[a]}	3:38
5.	"You Are the One"	Dimant; Goldstein; John O'Brien; Tony Reyes; Yamin	Abraham	4:17
6.	"I'm the Man"	Marshall Altman; Paul Fox	Abraham	4:08
7.	"Train Wreck"	Derek Bramble; Michelle Lewis; Yamin	Bramble	3:02
8.	"Free"	Kevin Risto; Wayne Nugent; Louis Biancaniello; Sam Watters; Robert L. Daniels; Mar'Liana I. Kemp	Michael Mangini	4:06
9.	"Alright"	Dimant; Reyes; Yamin	Abraham; DJ Lethal	3:12
10.	"Take My Breath Away"	David Ryan Harris	Abraham	3:49
11.	"A Song for You"	Leon Russell	Mangini	3:56

Digital edition bonus tracks
No.	Title	Writer(s)	Producer(s)	Length
12.	"Whiter Shade of Pale"	Keith Reid; Gary Brooker; Matthew Fisher	Mangini	5:12
13.	"In Love with You Forever"	Altman; Mike Busbee	Busbee	4:19

Special edition bonus disc
No.	Title	Writer(s)	Producer(s)	Length
1.	"Let Your Heart Lead"	Benjamin Anderson; Jeremy Johnson	Abraham	3:39
2.	"I'll Make You Dance"	Oliver Goldstein; Aaron Goldstein; Reyes; Yamin	Abraham	3:42

Notes

- ^{^[a]} signifies a vocal producer

== Personnel ==
Credits adapted from the album's liner notes.

- Elliott Yamin – vocals
- Oliver Goldstein – synthesizers (1), programming (1, 9), bass (1, 5, 9), additional keyboards (3), acoustic piano (5), acoustic guitar (5), guitars (6, 9)
- Ely "The Creep" Rise – keyboards (1, 3), synthesizers (1, 3), strings (1, 3), acoustic piano (3)
- DJ Lethal – programming (1, 3, 9)
- Mikkel S. Erikson – all instruments (2, 4)
- Tor Erik Hermansen – all instruments (2, 4)
- Amund Bjørklund – all instruments (4)
- Espen Lind – all instruments (4), guitars (4)
- Derek Bramble – keyboards (7), programming (7), bass (7)
- Raymond Angry – acoustic piano (8, 11)
- Adam Pallin – programming (8), additional keyboards (8)
- Rob Bacon – guitars (7)
- John McCurry – guitars (8)
- Ryan Williams – guitars (9)
- Josh Abraham – guitars (10)
- Dave Borla – drums (5)
- Josh Freese – drums (6, 10)
- Amy Wood – drums (7)
- Caesar Griffin – drums (8)
- Miguel Rivera – tambourine (7)
- Derrick Edmondson – saxophones (7)
- Steve Baxter – trombone (7)
- Michael Hunter – trumpet (7)
- Taj Jackson – backing vocals (2, 4)
- Tony Reyes – backing vocals (3, 6), keyboards (5, 6, 9, 10), guitars (5, 10), bass (10)
- Honey Larochelle – backing vocals (8)

=== Production ===
- Josh Abraham – executive producer
- Jeff Rabhan – executive producer
- Rich Christina – A&R
- Danny Strick – A&R
- Monet Corso – A&R coordinator
- Michael Anderson – production coordinator (7)

Technical

- Ryan Williams – mixing (1), engineer (3, 5, 9)
- Mikkel S. Erikson – recording (2, 4)
- Phil Tan – mixing (2, 4)
- Kari Egsieker – engineer (3, 5, 6, 9, 10), mixing (3, 5, 6, 9, 10)
- Colin Miller – mixing (7)
- Howie Beno – engineer (8, 11)
- Jason Goldstein – mixing (8)
- Josh Houghkirk – assistant engineer (2, 4)
- Micah Laughlin – assistant engineer (5, 6, 10)
- Marcus Samperio – assistant engineer (5, 6, 10)
- Chris Gehringer – mastering (1)
- Tom Coyne – mastering (2–11)
- Sterling Sound (New York, NY) – mastering location

Imagery

- Nick Spanos – photography
- Brian Porizek – art direction and design

== Charts ==
=== Weekly charts ===
Weekly chart performance for Elliott Yamin
Chart (2007–08)	Peak position
Japanese Albums (Oricon)	8
US Billboard 200	3
US Digital Albums (Billboard)	3
US Independent Albums (Billboard)	1
US Top Internet Albums (Billboard)	3
US Top R&B/Hip-Hop Albums (Billboard)	11

=== Year-end charts ===
Year-end chart performance for Elliott Yamin
Chart (2007)	Position
US Billboard 200	114
US Independent Albums (Billboard)	11
US Top R&B/Hip-Hop Albums (Billboard)	91

Chart (2008)	Position
Japanese Albums (Oricon)	96

== Certifications ==
Certifications and sales for Elliott Yamin
Region	Certification	Certified units/sales
Japan (RIAJ)	Gold	100,000
United States (RIAA)	Gold	527,000

== Release history ==
Elliott Yamin release history
Region	Date	Edition	Format	Label	Ref(s)
United States	March 20, 2007	Elliott Yamin standard edition	CD; Digital download	Hickory; RED	
Japan	May 21, 2008	Wait for You standard edition	CD; Digital download	Avex Trax	
Japan	On October 8, 2008	Wait for You premium edition	CD; Digital download	Avex Trax	
