= Paul L. Nguyen =

American doctor and researcher

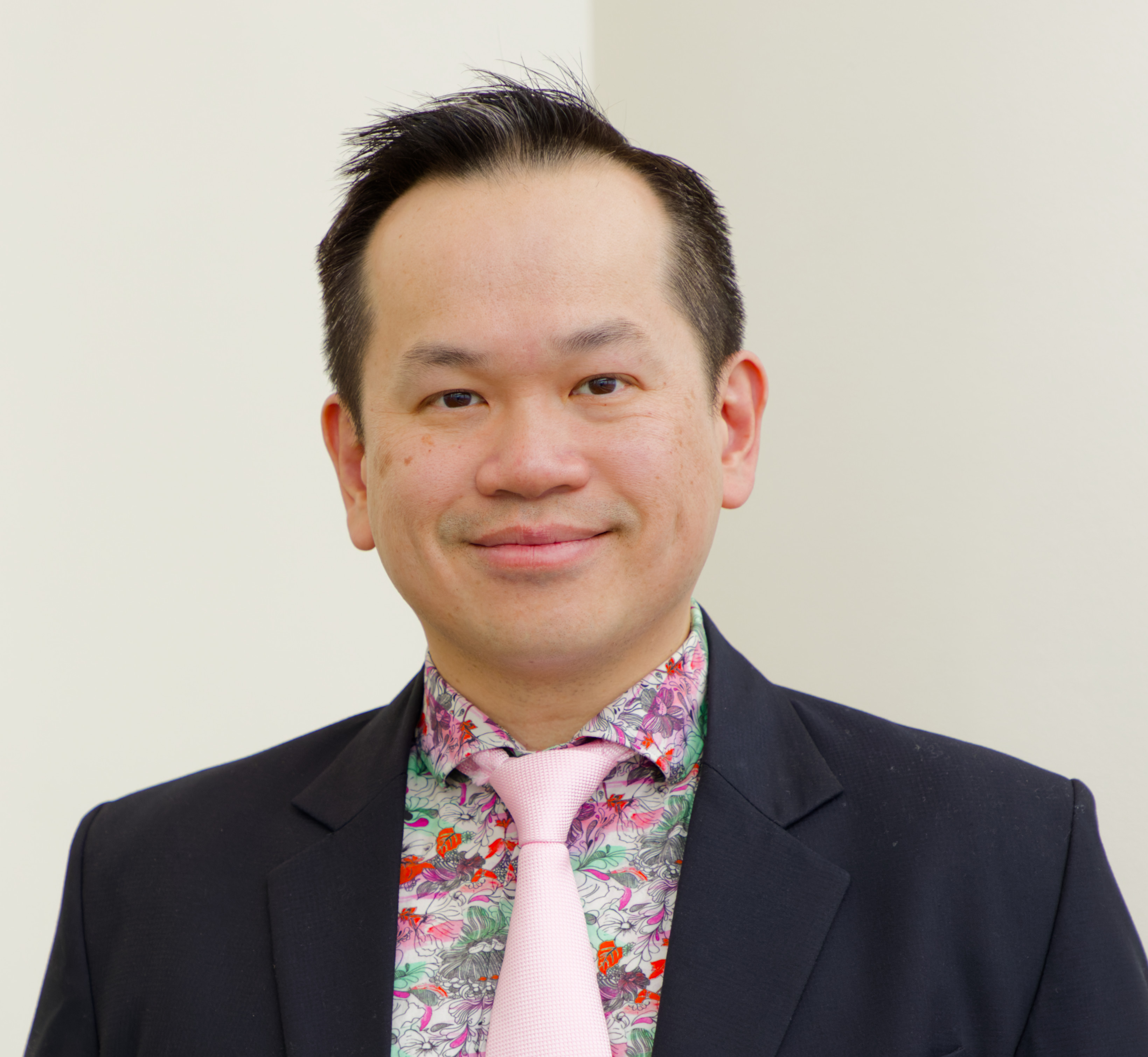
- Nguyen in 2025
- Born: Paul Linh Nguyen
- Education: Harvard University (AB); Harvard Medical School (MD); Massachusetts Institute of Technology (MBA)
- Occupations: Radiation oncologist; Researcher
- Employers: Dana-Farber Cancer Institute; Brigham and Women's Hospital; Harvard Medical School
- Known for: Radiation oncology

Paul L. Nguyen is an American radiation oncologist and researcher specializing in prostate cancer research and clinical care. Nguyen has worked with the Dana–Farber Cancer Institute, the Brigham and Women's Hospital, and Harvard Medical School, and his research has sought to assess the effectivity of hormone-targeted therapy in treating prostate cancer, the importance of social systems like marriage on cancer-related outcomes, and the personalization of therapy for prostate cancer patients based on genetic risk, among other questions.

== Early life and education ==
Nguyen received an AB from Harvard University in 1998; he had studied philosophy while on the pre-med track. After graduating, he deferred his acceptance to Harvard Medical School for two years to work at Boston Consulting Group.

Afterward, Nguyen earned an MD from Harvard Medical School; he also completed an MBA program at the MIT Sloan School of Management. He then completed his residency at the Harvard Radiation Oncology Program as a chief resident.

== Career ==
Nguyen is the director of radiation oncology at the Dana–Farber Cancer Institute's Lank Center for Genitourinary Oncology. He also serves as its vice-chair for clinical research, in addition to serving as a professor in the Department of Radiation Oncology at Harvard Medical School.

At Brigham and Women's Hospital, Nguyen is the Baldwin-Politi Distinguished Chair in Oncology and the Associate Director of the Harvard Radiation Oncology Program residency. In particular, he directs fellowships/residencies in Adult CNS Radiosurgery/Radiotherapy, Brachytherapy, and Supportive and Palliative Radiation Oncology.

In addition to his roles at the Dana-Farber Cancer Institute and the Brigham and Women's Hospital, Nguyen serves in several positions elsewhere in the field of cancer research and radiation oncology. He is the Co-Chair of the GU Steering Committee in the National Cancer Institute, Chair of the American Radium Society/American College of Radiology's Appropriateness Criteria Committee for Prostate Cancer, and Chair of the Annual Refresher Course at the American Society for Radiation Oncology. In 2025, Nguyen was appointed the chair of the NRG Oncology GU Cancer Committee.

== Research ==
=== Androgen deprivation therapy ===
Androgen deprivation therapy has been considered standard treatment for aggressive prostate cancer, but there have also been debates about ADT's side effects "including hot flashes, weight gain, diabetes and loss of sex drive—and, more recently, to cardiovascular risks"; a 2011 study also associated ADT with higher risk of blood clots.

In 2011, a study in the Journal of the American Medical Association led by Nguyen found that hormone-targeted therapy, specifically ADT, reduced the "overall risk of death" for individuals with aggressive prostate cancer. The observation resulted from the collated data of 11 studies that either assigned high-risk prostate cancer patients to receive hormone-targeted therapy or not; in total, 2,500 men were treated, and 2,300 weren't. Ultimately, the study found that 38% of the men with hormone-targeted therapy died, while 44% of the men without it died. The study also found no increase in the risk of cardiovascular disease from ADT, "as about 11 percent of men in both groups died of cardiovascular causes".

=== Marital status ===
In 2013, Nguyen was the senior author of a study investigating "the impact of marital status on stage at diagnosis, use of definitive therapy, and cancer-specific mortality among each of the 10 leading causes of cancer-related death in the United States." The study identified 1,260,898 patients diagnosed between 2004 and 2008 and analyzed 734,889 patients from them. Ultimately, the study found that married patients were "less likely to present with metastatic disease... and less likely to die as a result of their cancer" and that the benefit was greater in males than females. In particular, "the survival benefit associated with marriage was larger than the published survival benefit of chemotherapy" for prostate, breast, colorectal, esophageal, and head and neck cancers.

=== Penile size study ===
Following treatment for prostate cancer, some men have reported shrinking of their penises on internet forums like MedHelp. One man, 32 years old at the time, stated:

I specifically asked my doctors before the surgery multiple times about possible complications and cosmetic outcomes and never once was possible penile shortening mentioned... Erectile length probably shouldn't matter if the surgery is otherwise successful, but I would've preferred at the very least a warning about the risk of shortening—even if temporary—so I could've at least psychologically prepared for the possibility or perhaps opted for another treatment.

In 2013, Nguyen led a study investigating the extent to which men with prostate cancer, after receiving surgery, radiotherapy, or radiotherapy with androgen deprivation therapy, perceived a reduction in penis size. No measurements were taken, as the study concerned whether patients thought their penises "seemed shorter after treatment." However, Nguyen noted that other, actual "measurement studies" found an average reduction of one centimeter in size and speculated that such a reduction could be due to "some shrinking or fibrosis of the prostate or erectile tissue that makes it firmer and less elastic."

The study, published in Urology, found that only 25 men out of 948 reported reduced penis size; stratified by treatment, the study observed that the reports came from those who received surgery or radiotherapy with androgen deprivation therapy. The study's conclusions noted an association between perception of reduced penile size with "greater interference with close emotional relationships and increased treatment regret" and recommended the discussion of perceived reduced penile size as a side effect of prostate cancer treatment.

=== FORMULA-509 trial ===
Nguyen was the principal investigator of the FORMULA-509 trial, a randomized, multi-center, open-label trial in prostate cancer. The trial concerned post-radical prostatectomy patients and whether salvage radiotherapy paired with six months of gonadotropin-releasing hormones (GnRH), specifically abiraterone acetate plus prednisolone (AAP) and apalutamide (Apa), could improve outcomes in progression-free survival and metastasis-free survival. The study found statistically significant benefits for certain groups of patients, stratified by prostate-specific antigen (PSA), but not others.

=== PREDICT-RT trial ===
Nguyen was the principal investigator for the NRG-GU009 or PREDICT-RT trial at NRG Oncology. The trial utilized the Decipher score, a genomic assay used to stratify high-risk prostate cancer patients based on genetic risk. Nguyen's interest in genetic markers for prostate cancer had emerged from a dissatisfaction with the "one-size-fits-all" approach in prostate cancer treatment at the time: "When a man is diagnosed with high-risk prostate cancer, we don’t have a widely accepted way to sub-classify their cancer and truly personalize their therapy, but we think we will in the near future."

In 2021, Nguyen reported to the American Society for Radiation Oncology that Decipher scores were "independently associated with distant metastases (DM), prostate cancer-specific mortality (PCSM) and overall survival (OS)". The PREDICT-RT trial thus sought to investigate new ways of personalizing therapy and determine whether to intensify or de-intensify therapy depending on genetic risk determined by the Decipher score. Specifically, in the trial, individuals with lower genetic risk were given hormone therapy treatment schedules lasting 12 months rather than 24 while individuals with higher genetic risk were given the standard 24 months along with Apa.
