= HealthBoards =

Health-based social networking website

HealthBoards.com
- Company type: Private
- Industry: Healthcare, Internet
- Founded: July 26, 1998; 27 years ago Los Angeles, California, U.S.
- Headquarters: El Segundo, California, U.S.
- Key people: Charles Simmons, Founder and President (1998-2011); Robert Brisco, President and CEO, Internet Brands
- Website: http://www.healthboards.com/

HealthBoards is a long-running social networking support group website, consisting of over 280 Internet message boards for patient to patient health support (also referred to as a virtual community or an online health community). HealthBoards was one of the first stand alone health community websites. Health communities prior to it had generally been part of large web portals (WebMD, Yahoo, iVillage, etc.). The HealthBoards members post messages to share information and support on a wide range of health issues such as cancer, back pain, autism, and women's health. As of October 2013, the site had over 1 million registered members, 5 million posted messages, and over 10 million monthly visitors.

== History ==
HealthBoards was founded in 1998 by Charles Simmons, a software engineer in Los Angeles, California. In 1997, after experiencing a variety of symptoms for which doctors had no explanation, Simmons turned to the Web for answers and support. When he did not find online support groups in the areas he needed, he realized that there was a need for a health support website covering a wide range of health topics. After a year of development, HealthBoards was launched on July 26, 1998, with 70 message boards. The original site was developed using custom Perl software written by Simmons. HealthBoards quickly gained popularity. In January 2001, the site began using an internet forum software package called UBB. By November 2003, HealthBoards had reached 100,000 members. Due to considerable growth in traffic and problems with UBB, the site was transitioned to VBulletin 3.0, a more robust internet forum software system. After 2003 HealthBoards experienced its most rapid growth and became one of the largest health communities on the Web. In 2005 HealthBoards was rated as one of the top 20 health websites by Consumer Reports Health WebWatch. Selection for inclusion as a "Top 20" site was based solely on web traffic volume. These sites were then evaluated using criteria developed by Consumers Union in partnership with Health Improvement Institute. Areas of evaluation included ease of use, accessibility, transparency, editorial adequacy, advertising, and information reliability among others. The site was among eight that received an overall good rating though its evaluation at the time noted its content ”...has no authoritative information, anyone can post any claim”. In 2011 the site was acquired by Internet Brands.

== Operation ==
On HealthBoards, health topics are given individual message boards. Each message board topic typically contains thousands of discussion threads, each relating to a specific question, comment, or response initiated by a HealthBoards member. Participation on HealthBoards is free and requires registration and agreement and adherence to the Posting Policy, enforced by volunteer member moderators. An anonymous login username and an email address are required. Unregistered guests may still view and search the contents of the message boards, but cannot post messages.

The support group is limited to registered member's own experience and opinion though members who are healthcare professionals may not disclose their backgrounds or credentials. All professional advice or opinion is discouraged per Healthboards.com posting policy. Excerpts from members' own posts may be shared on the boards or blogs. The boards and blogs are moderated to keep them free of spam, inappropriate comments, unverifiable information, and unapproved links. Copying and pasting from other than the member's own posts is restricted. Links to research sites are not allowed "for any reason" nor links to outside health related sites without express approval of healthboards.com. United States .gov URLs are allowed "ONLY IF specifically requested by the thread originator" as stated in the healthboard.com posting policy.

== Revenue model ==
HealthBoards's business model is advertisement based which provides free access to registered members. Only paid advertising is allowed. Advertising posted by members is not permitted on the message boards or blogs and will be removed by moderators. Advertisers may buy ads directly from HealthBoards or through partners such as Google.

== See also ==
- Online communities
- List of Internet forums
