= Elliott Yamin =

American singer (born 1978)

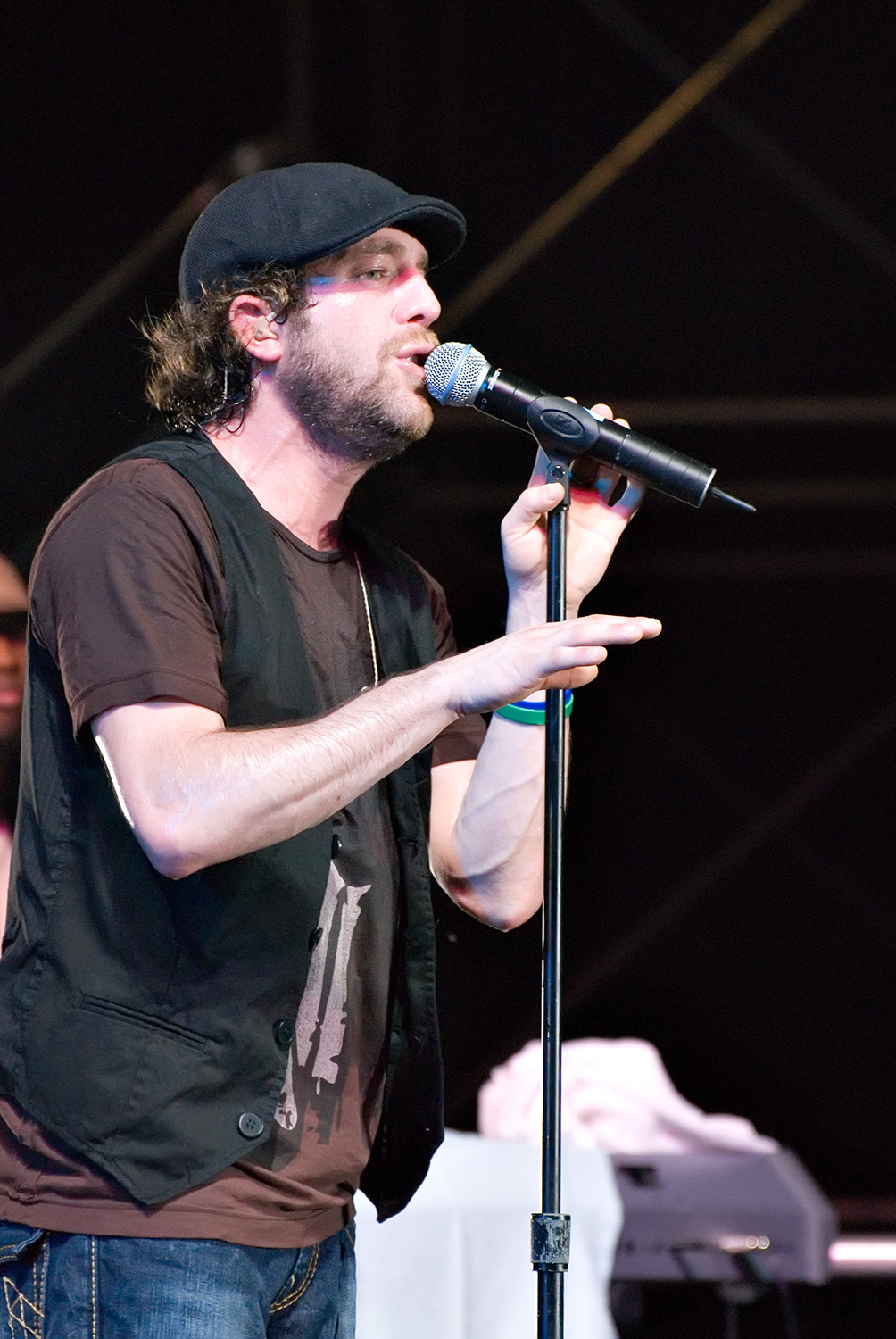
- Yamin performing live at Live & Loud Kuala Lumpur 2007 in at the Bukit Kiara Equestrian Park in Kuala Lumpur, Malaysia, on December 1, 2007

Background information
- Also known as: E-Dub
- Born: Efraym Elliott Yamin
- Origin: Richmond, Virginia, U.S.
- Genres: Pop; R&B
- Occupations: Singer; songwriter
- Years active: 2005–present
- Labels: Hickory; TRP; Fontana; Avex

Ephraim Elliott Yamin (born July 20, 1978) is an American singer known for his hit single "Wait for You" and for placing third on the fifth season of American Idol.

His self-titled album, released March 20, 2007, debuted at number one on the Billboard Independent Albums chart and at number three on the Billboard 200. The album was certified gold in the United States in October 2007. Retitled Wait for You, the album was released in Japan in May 2008 and certified gold in that country in September 2008.

Yamin also released two Christmas collections: Sounds of the Season: The Elliott Yamin Holiday Collection in October 2007 and My Kind of Holiday in October 2008.

Yamin's second album, titled Fight for Love, was released on May 5, 2009. The album's first single, "Fight for Love", premiered on AOL Music on February 13, 2009.

His third album, Gather 'Round was released in Japan in 2011. It was retitled in the United States as Let's Get to What's Real and released in 2012. The first single in Japan and the United States was "3 Words".

His fourth album, As Time Goes By, was released exclusively for the Japanese market on November 5, 2015. Previous to the album release, a video for the single "Katy" was released on late October 2015. Yamin travelled to Japan to promote the album in early November.

== Biography ==
=== Early life ===
Ephraim Elliott Yamin was born to an Israeli-Iraqi father whose Iraqi Jewish family moved from Baghdad to Israel and Claudette Goldberg Yamin, a former professional singer known for her "fiery spirit". His mother is also known for receiving the "Golden Idol for Proudest Family Moment Award" from Ryan Seacrest during her son's American Idol competition. His family relocated to Richmond, Virginia, when Yamin was 11, and his parents divorced when he was 14, his father returning to Los Angeles. Yamin went to school in Richmond at Tuckahoe Middle School, and later, Douglas S. Freeman High School. Dropping out of high school in his sophomore year, he later achieved a high school GED while working at Foot Locker (in their management program), a pharmacy, and as an on-air disc jockey for local R&B radio station WCDX/Power 92 FM, using the name E-Dub before auditioning for American Idol. Yamin has an older half-sister and a younger brother.

A history of ear infections as a child and eardrum replacement surgery at 13 left Yamin with 90% hearing loss in his right ear. He was diagnosed with Type I diabetes at the age of 16 and wears an insulin pump to help him manage his diabetes. Yamin is 5'6" tall.

Yamin first discovered his vocal talent while singing karaoke in his late teens. Although he had not been musically trained, he sang in a local jazz band and in amateur performance forums emulating Stevie Wonder, Whitney Houston, and Donny Hathaway.

=== American Idol ===
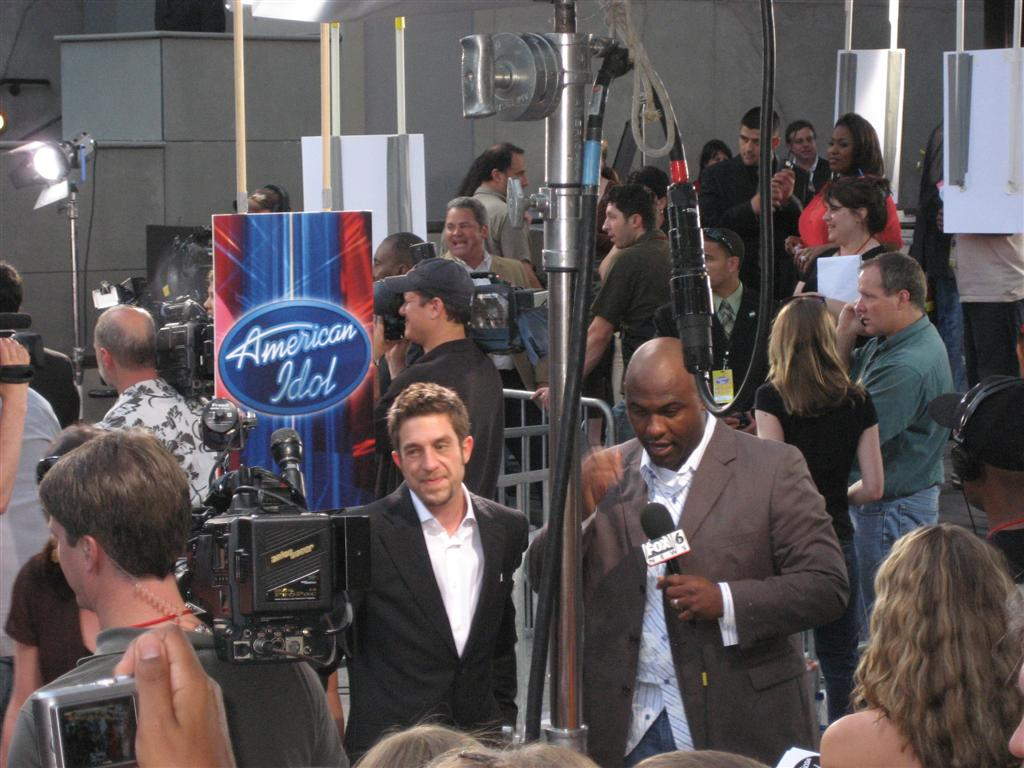
Yamin on May 24, 2006, back stage at American Idol

Yamin auditioned in Boston, Massachusetts, singing Leon Russell's "A Song for You", but his audition was not aired (it was later aired on October 24, 2009, as part of the American Idol Rewind – season 5 show). He performed the song again in front of the judges during Hollywood rounds, as well as Rascal Flatts's "Bless the Broken Road". During the group auditions, Yamin and his group performed "It's In Her Kiss" (aka "The Shoop Shoop Song") from Betty Everett; Simon Cowell disliked the group performance, but Randy Jackson said Yamin was the best one in his group, and Paula Abdul said it was a good thing she could look past two left feet, in a way of saying he did not dance well but he could definitely sing. He was sent through by the judges and made it through to the finals of the competition.

During one weekly rehearsal, guest coach Stevie Wonder told Yamin that he should definitely pursue a career in music. Simon Cowell stated that he thought Yamin was "potentially the best male vocalist" in five seasons on American Idol and later, after Yamin's "A Song for You" performance, he declared that it was a "vocal masterclass". His performance of "A Song for You" ranked third on Entertainment Weekly's countdown of the 16 best American Idol performances in the series history.

On the May 10, 2006, results show Yamin, Taylor Hicks, and Katharine McPhee were announced as the top three finalists. All three returned to their respective hometowns for a day of festivities in their honor. Yamin's homecoming visit included radio and television interviews; performing "Home" for more than 4,000 fans, capped by Mayor Douglas Wilder presenting the key to the city; and meeting Governor Tim Kaine, whom Yamin greeted with a hug. Yamin threw out the first pitch before a sold-out crowd at The Diamond for a Richmond Braves game and sang a verse a cappella of "A Song for You". Video highlights were shown on the top three results show.

Yamin was eliminated from American Idol on May 17, 2006, after the tightest race; each of the three top contestants received an almost exactly equal percentage of the viewer votes necessary for advancement to the remaining two spots.

==== Performances and results ====
Week #	Theme	Song choice	Original artist	Order #	Result
Audition	N/A	"A Song for You"	Leon Russell	N/A	Advanced
Hollywood	N/A	"Bless the Broken Road"	Nitty Gritty Dirt Band	N/A	Advanced
Hollywood – Group Performance	N/A	"The Shoop Shoop Song (It's in Her Kiss)"	Betty Everett	N/A	Advanced
Top 50	N/A	"A Song for You"	Donny Hathaway	N/A	Advanced
Top 24 (12 Men)	N/A	"If You Really Love Me"	Stevie Wonder	9	Safe
Top 20 (10 Men)	N/A	"Moody's Mood for Love"	James Moody	2	Safe
Top 16 (8 Men)	N/A	"Heaven"	Bryan Adams	7	Safe
Top 12	Stevie Wonder	"Knocks Me Off My Feet"	Stevie Wonder	3	Safe
Top 11	1950s	"Teach Me Tonight"	The DeCastro Sisters	9	Safe
Top 10	2000s	"I Don't Want to Be"	Gavin DeGraw	10	Safe
Top 9	Country	"If Tomorrow Never Comes"	Garth Brooks	3	Bottom 2
Top 8	Queen	"Somebody to Love"	Queen	6	Bottom 3
Top 7	Great American Songbook	"It Had to Be You"	Sam Lanin	4	Safe
Top 6	Love songs	"A Song for You"	Leon Russell	2	Safe
Top 5	Year They Were Born (1978); Current Billboard Top 10	"On Broadway" "Home"	The Crystals; Michael Bublé	1; 6	Bottom 2^{1}
Top 4	Elvis Presley	"If I Can Dream" "Trouble"	Elvis Presley	3; 7	Safe
Top 3	Clive Davis's Choice; Judge's Choice (Paula Abdul); Contestant's Choice	"Open Arms" "What You Won't Do for Love" "I Believe to My Soul"	Journey; Bobby Caldwell; Ray Charles	1; 4; 7	Eliminated

- ^Note 1: When Ryan Seacrest announced the results for this particular night, Yamin was among the Bottom 2 but declared safe when Paris Bennett was eliminated.

Semi-finals:

- Week 1: "If You Really Love Me" (Stevie Wonder) The judges loved his performance. Jackson called him a hot one and brilliant, Abdul said it was a great performance since beginning to end, and Cowell called him potentially the best male vocalist in the show in five seasons.
- Week 2: "Moody's Mood For Love" (James Moody) Jackson gave Yamin a stand-up ovation, Abdul said his performance was brilliant, and Cowell said although he was growing on confidence and gave a great performance, he "can't win a show like this with a song like that".
- Week 3: "Heaven" (Bryan Adams) Jackson said he would sign Yamin right after his performance, and Abdul called him phenomenal, amazing and fantastic. Cowell though said it was a copout and for the first time there was a disconnect between Yamin and the song.

Finals:

- Week 1: Stevie Wonder – "Knocks Me Off My Feet" Jackson said it was not Yamin's best performance but at the end it was good. Abdul loved his passion, and Cowell said it lacked of originality and lacked the "wow" factor, although it was a good rendition. Guest Stevie Wonder confessed to be impressed with Yamin, and said he should definitely choose singing as a profession.
- Week 2: Songs of the '50s – "Teach Me Tonight" (Al Jarreau) Jackson said Yamin chose the toughest song of the night and he worked it out. Abdul said she was moved by his performance, and Cowell said it was fantastic. Guest Barry Manilow said Yamin sings great but should keep remembering him about the story on the song.
- Week 3: Songs of the 21st Century – "I Don't Want To Be" (Gavin DeGraw) Jackson and Abdul liked the performance and the arrangements, Jackson calling Yamin a hot one, while Abdul called him "a funky white boy". Cowell said: "great song, terrible arrangement, good vocals and hideous dancing"; show host Ryan Seacrest liked the equation.
- Week 4: Country Songs – "If Tomorrow Never Comes" (Garth Brooks) Jackson said the competition finally started with Yamin's rendition. Abdul called him humble and understated, and stated he has a reckless abandon. Cowell called it safe and thought Yamin was nervous that night, which Yamin agreed. Guest Kenny Rogers thought Yamin could do great with the song. Yamin was in the Bottom 2 that week.
- Week 5: Queen – "Somebody to Love" Jackson said he sang the hardest song and loved it despite some pitch problems. Abdul said he was the best vocals of the night and said it was his best performance so far. Cowell agreed in that Yamin chose the tough one and he pulled it off. Guests Brian May and Roger Taylor (Queen members) thought Yamin chose the tough one that night and did a good job. Yamin was in the Bottom 3 that week.
- Week 6: Songs from The Great American Songbook – "It Had to Be You" (Frank Sinatra) Jackson said Yamin did a very nice job, and Abdul loved his performance. Cowell said it was a good vocal, but that he showed no personality, to what Yamin replied "I disagree"; Jackson and Abdul disagreed with Cowell too. Guest Rod Stewart called Yamin a blue-eyed soul.
- Week 7: Love Songs – "A Song for You" (Leon Russell as performed by Donny Hathaway) Jackson hated the arrangements but loved Yamin's performance. Abdul was moved to tears and called Yamin an American Idol and said he celebrates what the competition is about. Cowell called it superb and said it was in part a vocal masterclass. Guest David Foster seemed impatient with Yamin, but recognized he sings well.
- Week 8: Songs from the contestant's birth year (1978); Songs from the Top 10 of any Billboard Chart – "On Broadway" (by Barry Mann & Cynthia Weil, recorded by George Benson); "Home" (Michael Bublé) Jackson and Abdul said Yamin started rough in "On Broadway", but then got it together, while Cowell said it was disjointed. After "Home", Jackson said Yamin showed a tender side and made a nice job, and Abdul said it showed the richness of his voice. Cowell though said he was slightly worried for Yamin for singing a song that states he wants to go home and because the song has not enough of a hook. Yamin was in the Bottom 2 that week.
- Week 9: Elvis Presley – "If I Can Dream"; "Trouble" The judges liked his rendition of "If I Can Dream"; Jackson said it was hot, Abdul said it was his best vocal performance during the season, and Cowell said Yamin came to the show that night as the underdog, chose a song that not many people know and yet gave the best performance. Jackson and Abdul said "Trouble" was Yamin's best performance ever, and Cowell said Yamin fought, showed personality and deserved to get through to the next round. Guest Tommy Mottola said Yamin is a laidback kid and that he pulled it off well.
- Week 10: Clive Davis' pick; Judge's pick (Paula Abdul); Contestant's pick – "Open Arms" (Journey); "What You Won't Do for Love" (Bobby Caldwell); "I Believe to My Soul" (Ray Charles, as performed by Donny Hathaway) The judges had divergent opinions about "Open Arms", with Jackson saying he had problem in the chorus and he should take chances, Abdul said he was in excellent voice and did a great job, and Cowell said he was stiff and he should loosen up. Same happened with "What You Won't Do for Love": Jackson said Yamin was sharp, Abdul liked it and Cowell said he was pretty good because the style suit him although it was not the best song in the world. After "I Believe To My Soul" Jackson said it was not the perfect song for him but he could definitely sing and he did a good job, Abdul said nobody can sing songs like that like he did and called him a funky white boy again, and Cowell said Yamin is a great guy and a great singer and has made his mother proud, but also stated his song choices would not carry him through to the next round. Yamin was eliminated that week.

Finale: Yamin performed a duet with Mary J. Blige and participated in the Top 12 Burt Bacharach's medley and the "guys' medley".

- Guys Medley: "Takin' Care Of Business" (Bachman–Turner Overdrive) / "Tobacco Road" (John D. Loudermilk) / "Don't Stop" (Fleetwood Mac).
- "One" (U2 as performed by Mary J. Blige & U2) with Mary J. Blige
- "A House is Not a Home" (by Burt Bacharach)

=== After Idol ===
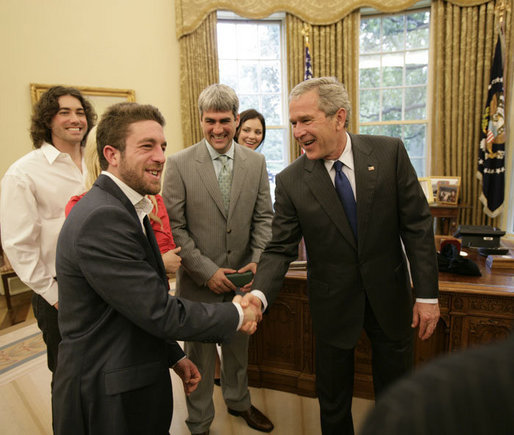
Former President George W. Bush welcomes Yamin in the Oval Office at the White House on Friday, July 28, 2006, along with Yamin's fellow performers, from left to right, Ace Young, Kellie Pickler, American Idol winner Taylor Hicks and runner-up Katharine McPhee.

Yamin appeared on several talk shows, including The Tonight Show, Live with Regis and Kelly and the Fox News Channel program, Dayside. On June 11, 2006, he performed "The Star-Spangled Banner" a cappella at Game 2 of the NBA finals.

He also appeared in the annual Pop Tart-sponsored national American Idols LIVE! Tour between July and September 2006. The tour included a sold-out show at the Richmond Coliseum in Yamin's hometown.

On October 8, 2006, Yamin performed at the Virginia State Fair as the closing act. He was the first contestant from Season 5 to have his own solo concert. His backup band was the Little Memphis Blues Orchestra. There was no new material featured in the concert; instead, he sang nine cover songs.

Virginia State Fair Song List
- "Use Me" (Bill Withers)
- "Ready For Love" (Bad Company)
- "Little Ghetto Boy" (Donny Hathaway)
- "I Believe To My Soul" (Donny Hathaway)
- "You've Got a Friend" (James Taylor)
- "Empty Arms" (Stevie Ray Vaughan)
- "I Love You More Than You'll Ever Know" (Donny Hathaway)
- "What's Going On?" (Marvin Gaye)
- "Whipping Post" (The Allman Brothers Band)

On December 8, 2006, Yamin sang "The Star-Spangled Banner", Marvin Gaye's "What's Going On?" and his newly released single, "This Christmas", as part of the 2006 Genworth Children's Advantage Classic (sponsored by the Genworth Foundation) at the Alltel Pavilion at the Virginia Commonwealth University's Stuart C. Siegel Center in Richmond. Proceeds from the tennis event, which featured James Blake, Andre Agassi, Lindsay Davenport, and Steffi Graf, benefited local programs for disadvantaged youth.

== Music career ==
=== Pre-Idol recordings ===
In 2005, Yamin was featured on three tracks ("Sound Doctrine", "Song of Hope", and "Whatchacomeherefoe?") of Richmond, Virginia gospel musical artist Big Planz's album Sound Doctrine. Four renditions of another song he recorded with Big Planz, "The Storm", were released on iTunes.

=== Post-Idol recordings ===
In December 2006, Yamin announced a music publishing contract with Sony/ATV Music Publishing. On January 25, 2007, Yamin signed a record deal with Hickory Records, a Sony/ATV-owned imprint set up as a "virtual label", with distribution handled by RED Distribution. Yamin has stated that "Sony invested in [him] as a partner" as part of a 50/50 deal, which means that "[they] both stand or fall".

=== 2007–2008: Elliott Yamin ===
As a teaser, Yamin released the song "Movin' On" from his self-titled debut album on AOL's First Listen and iTunes in February 2007. His first radio single, "Wait for You", was released on March 13, 2007.

Elliott Yamin was released on March 20, 2007, debuting at number three on the Billboard 200 chart with sales of 90,000 copies in its first week. The album was the highest new artist debut on an independent label in SoundScan history. The album was certified gold status by the RIAA on October 12, 2007.

To promote his album, Yamin made TV appearances on Live with Regis and Kelly, The Ellen DeGeneres Show, "Rachael Ray", Jimmy Kimmel Live!, and TRL, where the video for the song "Wait for You" was premiered on March 20, 2007. He also signed CDs at the New York Times Square Virgin Megastore across from the TRL studio and at Circuit City in his hometown, Richmond, Virginia, where the line went around the building.

During April and May 2007, Yamin embarked on a radio tour which included interviews and acoustic in-studio performances, accompanied by guitarist Russel Ali. Mark Gorlick (VP Artist Development & Marketing, Sony/BMG RED) emphasized the importance of this type of promotion: "We put together a five-week promo tour across the country, and just worked it...When programmers saw that the Elliott in person was consistent with the Elliott they saw on television that was huge."

On May 16, 2007, Yamin performed his hit single, "Wait for You", on the American Idol Season 6 Top 3 results show. The song jumped 60 spots on iTunes in a few hours as well as from 80 to 31 on the Billboard Hot 100. Following the performance, sales of his self-titled album increased, jumping 47 spots on the Billboard 200, from 67 to 20.

Yamin toured North America during May and June 2007, with pop/R&B singer Josh Hoge opening for him. The tour continued in October and November 2007, again with Hoge opening and adding the rock band The Last Goodnight. Fellow American Idol 5 alumnus José "Sway" Penala was added to Yamin's band to provide backing vocals.

Yamin performed in Washington, DC, at the country's biggest Independence Day celebration, "A Capitol Fourth", televised live on PBS on July 4, 2007, singing "In Love with You Forever" and "America the Beautiful". During August 2007, Yamin visited several local television morning shows for interviews and acoustic performances. He also appeared as himself on the television soap opera The Bold and the Beautiful (aired August 24) and the television drama Lincoln Heights (aired September 20), performing "Wait for You".

Yamin visited the Philippines in September 2007 for a free mall concert tour of the Ayala Malls to promote his self-titled album. During his press conference at the Glorietta Activity Center, Yamin expressed his excitement at being a part of the "warm and friendly...Filipino culture" and his desire to return with his full band for a concert tour. Following his TriNoma show on September 21, members of his fan group Yaminoys presented him with a "mini-me" Elliott doll. During the last concert held at the Alabang Town Center, Yamin accidentally stepped on the cord of his microphone while performing "Wait for You", inadvertently unplugging his microphone from the cord. A video of this can be seen on YouTube.

On December 1, 2007, Yamin performed at the Live & Loud 07 Music Festival in Kuala Lumpur, Malaysia, where he was the opening act for one of his personal idols, Whitney Houston. However he did not meet Houston.

Elliott Yamin placed on four-year-end Billboard charts for 2007, ranking at number 3 on the Independent Albums chart and at number 114 on The Billboard 200 chart, as well as ranking at number 39 on the Independent Albums decade-end chart (2009). "Wait for You" placed on six-year-end Billboard charts for 2007, ranking at number 11 on the Pop 100 Airplay chart and at number 41 on the Billboard Hot 100 Songs chart. "Wait for You" was honored as one of the most performed songs in the ASCAP repertory during 2007; Yamin performed it at the 25th Annual ASCAP Pop Music Awards on April 9, 2008, at the Kodak Theatre in Los Angeles. The song was certified Platinum in digital sales on October 16, 2008.

Yamin traveled to the United Kingdom, Belgium, the Netherlands and Germany to entertain service members as part of a USO/Armed Forces Entertainment tour from February 12 to 21, 2008.

On March 2, 2008, accompanied by Fantasia and a film crew, Yamin went on a four-day trip to Angola as a guest of Idol Gives Back sponsor ExxonMobil for the "Idol Gives Back" special. Footage of the pair distributing mosquito nets to villagers as part of the Malaria No More program was shown on the American Idol Season 7 Top 11 results show (March 19, 2008). Fantasia sang "Amazing Grace" and, following the local custom of naming a newborn after a visitor, a baby boy was named "Elliott", which reduced Yamin to tears. Yamin attended but did not perform on the Idol Gives Back show, broadcast on April 9, 2008.

On April 16, 2008, Yamin performed on the American Idol Season 7 Top 7 results show – dedicating the song "Free" to his late mother, Claudette Yamin (See Personal Life).

A Japan edition of Yamin's debut album was released on May 21, 2008, by Avex Trax. Retitled Wait for You, the album included bonus tracks "Believe" and "In Love With You Forever", the latter song featured in a Toyota Vitz commercial airing in Japan. Yamin made several trips to Japan during 2008 for media interviews and appearances to promote the album and performed 10 shows at Billboard Live venues in Tokyo, Osaka, and Fukuoka in August. The album was certified gold by the Recording Industry Association of Japan (RIAJ) in September 2008. A Premium Edition was released on October 8, 2008, containing additional bonus tracks: "A Whiter Shade of Pale" and "I'll Make You Dance", plus Yamin's cover version of "Home", originally from Japanese singer Yusaku Kiyama, who recorded a Japanese version of the song "Wait for You" in return. Kiyama and Yamin performed together during Yamin's October visit to promote the release of the Wait for You Premium Edition. Yamin was named one of the Best 3 New Artists (International) by the 23rd Annual Japan Gold Disc Awards along with Leona Lewis and Flo Rida. A standard edition and a special edition of Wait for You with different bonus tracks were also released in Taiwan in July and September 2008, respectively.

=== 2009–2010: Fight for Love ===
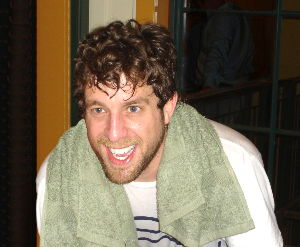
Yamin at a meet-and-greet after a May 2009 concert

"Fight for Love", the title track and lead single from Yamin's second album, premiered on AOL Music on February 13, 2009. The song, co-written and co-produced by Johntá Austin, became available at iTunes and other digital outlets on March 10, 2009; and was officially released for Top 40 and Rhythm radio airplay the same day.

Fight for Love was released on May 5, 2009. Yamin recorded 35 songs from which to choose the final track list and worked with various producers, including Jermaine Dupri, Eman, Harvey Mason, Jr., Steve Russell and Stargate. Yamin has described the album as more contemporary R&B pop than his debut with three or four more "radio-friendly" singles. Yamin co-wrote the majority of songs for the album, including "Someday", a song about his feelings of loss following the death of his mother. His collaboration with Jermaine Dupri, "When I'm Gone", became a bonus track on the Japanese edition, which was released on May 20, 2009. A Premium Edition of the album was released in Japan on October 21, 2009.

During March through early June 2009, Yamin promoted the new album with acoustic performances on air at radio stations and at radio-sponsored concerts, as well as a few club shows with his full band. Promotion in June 2009 included a three-week visit to Japan with 14 shows at Billboard Live venues and other appearances.

The second single, "Can't Keep on Loving You (From a Distance)", was released to Adult Contemporary radio on August 10, 2009.

Yamin and his band began their second USO/Armed Forces Entertainment tour on October 7, 2009, performing four concerts for troops and their families over 10 days in Guam and Japan.

On January 2, 2010, Yamin kicked off a month-long Fight for Love tour, which he described as "acoustic with a cool twist", in Alexandria, Virginia. The tour schedule included dates in the Northeastern and Southeastern United States, as well as Arizona and California, although the California dates were subsequently cancelled.

In February 2010, Yamin returned to Angola as a representative of Idol Gives Back, this time accompanied by Kara DioGuardi. During his performance at the 1st Annual Washington Ideas Forum on October 2, 2009, Yamin had announced a $100,000 grant to the Saint Isabel Orphanage and School in Luanda, Angola, from ExxonMobil as part of their malaria prevention program. The grant was made to enable the school, which Yamin had visited in 2008 with Fantasia, to improve and expand their facility. Video of Yamin and DioGuardi visiting the ongoing construction of the school dormitory, as well as distributing bed nets, was shown on the American Idol Season 9 Top 9 (second week) results show (April 14, 2010). Sister Domingas Loureira, director of the orphanage, flew to Los Angeles as a guest of American Idol and ExxonMobil and sat next to Yamin at Idol Gives Back performance on April 21, 2010. Later that week, Yamin performed "The Star-Spangled Banner" in honor of World Malaria Day at Washington Nationals and Chicago White Sox baseball games.

From February 22 to 27, 2010, Yamin represented the U.S. in the international competition of the LI Festival Internacional de la Canción de Viña del Mar (LI International Song Festival of Viña del Mar), in Chile, against interpreters from Argentina, Chile, Cuba, France, Italy, Mexico, Peru, Spain and UK The competition's theme was "Songs with History", and Yamin performed "Rock Around the Clock". On February 25, he was announced as one of the five semi-finalists in the Festival, along with the representative artists of Argentina, Cuba, Italy and Chile. On February 26 the three finalists were announced: Argentina, Cuba and Italy; Chile and the USA were eliminated from the competition that night.

During the early morning hours of February 27, as the festival entered its final day, Chile experienced a magnitude 8.8 earthquake. Yamin was uninjured – relaying his experience via multiple Twitter messages and phone interviews with American media the morning of the 27th.

On March 7, 2010, Yamin performed at the 11th Annual Children Uniting Nations Oscar Celebration, held at the Beverly Hilton Hotel in Beverly Hills, California.

In June 2010, Yamin was invited by United Airlines to fly on its inaugural flight from Washington, DC, to Accra, Ghana. While in Ghana, he helped the non-profit organization Malaria No More deliver mosquito nets donated by ExxonMobil to a children's hospital in Accra.

=== 2011: Gather 'Round/Let's Get to What's Real ===
On February 2, 2011, Yamin released, exclusively for the Japanese market, his third studio album, Gather 'Round, which contains 12 tracks. The album's first single was 3 Words.

A May 2011 interview with American Idol blogger Rodney Ho of the Atlanta Journal-Constitution indicated Yamin was no longer with Hickory Records and had not signed with another US label.

In January 2012, it was announced that his third studio album, Gather 'Round, would be released in the United States under the title Let's Get to What's Real on April 10, 2012, on the E1/Purpose Music Group label. The album contains all but three of the tracks from the Japanese version, and includes two new songs: "Enough Love" and "Up, Down, All Around". The lead single is the song "3 Words" which was also released as the first Japanese single.

=== 2015–present: As Time Goes By ===
On November 5, 2015, Yamin released, again exclusively for the Japanese market, his fourth studio album, As Time Goes By, which contains 12 tracks.

A video for the single "Katy" was released in Japan in late October 2015. Yamin travelled to Japan to promote the album in early November.

=== Holiday collections ===
==== Sounds of the Season: The Elliott Yamin Holiday Collection ====
On October 14, 2007, Yamin released Sounds Of The Season: The Elliott Yamin Holiday Collection, a Christmas album with 8 tracks, including two originals recorded specifically for the album. Distributed exclusively through Target stores during the 2007 holiday season, it sold 81,000 copies.

==== My Kind of Holiday ====
On October 7, 2008, Yamin released another holiday album titled My Kind of Holiday. It includes the 8 tracks from Sounds of the Season: The Elliott Yamin Holiday Collection, plus 2 new tracks: "Back Door Santa" and "Christmas Without Carol", which he co-wrote.

My Kind of Holiday Track Listing
1. "This Christmas"
2. "Warm Me Up"
3. "Jingle Bells"
4. "A Very Merry Christmas"
5. "Little Drummer Boy"
6. "Back Door Santa"
7. "The Christmas Song"
8. "Merry Christmas, Baby"
9. "Let's Be Naughty (And Save Santa the Trip)"
10. "Christmas Without Carol"

The Japan Exclusive Edition of the album was released on December 10, 2008, and includes three bonus tracks: "Sharing the Night Together", an acoustic version of "Home", and "Wait for You (The Standard Club Piano Dance Remix)".

=== Compilation albums ===
==== Randy Jackson's Music Club, Vol. 1 ====
On March 11, 2008, producer Randy Jackson released his first studio album, in which Yamin features in a duet with American Idol co-contestant Katharine McPhee. The song, "Real Love", is a cover of a Lee Ryan song, using the male/female structure of the Trinity Stone featuring Ne-Yo cover. The song was released as a single for radio airplay on April 22, 2008.

==== DisneyMania 6 ====
Yamin covered Elton John's Academy Award-winning song in 1994, "Can You Feel the Love Tonight" from Disney's The Lion King, for the compilation album DisneyMania 6, released on May 20, 2008.

On October 27, 2008, Yamin performed in a concert as part of the celebration of the 10th anniversary of the Peres Center for Peace in Israel. The concert was titled "Believe: Celebrating a Decade of Peacebuilding Activities" and took place at the Tel Aviv Performing Arts Center. Yamin performed "Can You Feel the Love Tonight", and then closed the concert in a duet with singer Liel Kolet, performing "I Wish That...", a song written by Diane Warren. Other artists that were scheduled to perform include Andrea Bocelli, Slash and Dave Koz.

=== Collaborations ===
==== Taylor Hicks: The Distance ====
Yamin collaborated with fellow American Idol Taylor Hicks on Hicks' second album, The Distance, released on March 10, 2009. They recorded a duet of a cover of Bobby Womack's "Woman's Gotta Have It".

==== Sanjoy: OBVI ====
Yamin collaborated with Bangladeshi American DJ Sanjoy in the fast-paced pop EDM "OBVI," released on January 13, 2017. Yamin was selected as the singer after "OBVI" brought Sanjoy back memories of his first kiss in high school to Yamin's song "Wait for You".

==== Philthy: Party Crashers ====
Yamin collaborated with jazz musician Phil Lassiter in his second album Party Crashers, released digitally on July 6, 2018. The album contains 11 tracks featuring former member of Prince & The New Power Generation, Philip Lassiter, members of Snarky Puppy, Bobby Sparks, Mark Lettieri & Jason Thomas, and Mono Neon.

On April 21, 2018, Yamin performed "The Star-Spangled Banner" for the Toyota Owners 400 Monster Energy NASCAR Cup Series race at Richmond Raceway in Richmond, Virginia.

== Advocacy ==
As a diabetic, Yamin supports and works as a spokesman for various organizations, including the Juvenile Diabetes Research Foundation (JDRF). In October 2006, Yamin sang "The Star-Spangled Banner" at the Dodger Stadium (LA) and cut the ribbon during the JDRF International Walk to Cure Diabetes. In addition, a portion of the proceeds from his Virginia State Fair concert benefitted the JDRF. The Central Virginia Chapter of the JDRF honored Yamin for his commitment to diabetes awareness and research at its 8th Annual Spring Gala on March 1, 2008; more than $400,000 was raised at the event. He returned for the 9th Annual Spring Gala on April 4, 2009.

In August 2007, Yamin visited Capitol Hill as International Celebrity Advocate Co-chair of the Promise to Remember Me Campaign to petition Representatives for their support to extend the Special Diabetes Program, which provides federal funding for type 1 diabetes research.

In October 2007, Yamin was named Global Ambassador to promote the Inspired by Diabetes Creative Expression Competition, a global contest in which people with diabetes, as well as their friends and families, can share through art, music, or essay how the disease has impacted their lives.

During his fall 2007 concert tour, Yamin announced that 100% of proceeds from the sale of designated T-shirts and pins would benefit the Life for a Child Program, which provides insulin, as well as diabetes-related care and supplies, for children in developing countries.

On World Diabetes Day, November 14, 2007, Yamin was joined by children with diabetes for a performance of the song "Promise to Remember Me" in the United Nations' Rose Garden. Following the World Diabetes Day ceremonies, Yamin taped a segment of the Montel Williams Show during which he shared his experiences learning to live with the disease and performed "Wait for You". The 30-minute segment was aired on November 29, 2007.

During October 2009, Yamin was a guest speaker at the World Diabetes Congress in Montreal, Canada, speaking at an open forum on "Living with diabetes and its complications: perspective of someone with diabetes".

On November 3, 2010, Yamin appeared on Don't Forget the Lyrics, contesting for two charities: JDRF and Malaria No More. He won $5,000 for them.

On November 5, 2010, Yamin was a guest performer at the 40th Anniversary of Africare.

During October and November 2012, Yamin was an integral part of the Big Blue Test campaign organized by Diabetes Hands Foundation, to raise awareness of the importance of exercise and help people with diabetes in need.

== Discography ==
=== Studio albums ===
Title	Details	Chart positions						Sales	Certifications (sales threshold)
Title	Details	US	US R&B	US Indie	US Digital	US Holiday	JPN	Sales	Certifications (sales threshold)
Elliott Yamin	Released: March 20, 2007; Label: Hickory	3	11	1	3	—	8	US: 527,000	RIAA: Gold
Sounds of the Season: The Elliott Yamin Holiday Collection	Released: October 14, 2007; Label: Hickory	32	20	4	—	1	—	US: 81,000	
My Kind of Holiday	Released: October 7, 2008; Label: TRP/Fontana/Avex Trax	162	19	22	—	18	—	US: 27,000	
Wait for You	Released: May 21, 2008 (Japan); Label: Hickory	—	—	—	—	—	8	JPN: 130,800	
Fight for Love	Released: May 5, 2009; Label: Hickory	26	—	4	26	—	19	US: 49,000	
Gather 'Round	Released: February 2, 2011 (Japan); Label: Avex Trax	—	—	—	—	—	61		
Let's Get to What's Real	Released: March 27, 2012; Label: E1/Purpose Music Group	—	30	39	—	—	—	US: 2,000	
Best for You	Released: March 6, 2013 (Japan); Label: Avex Trax	—	—	—	—	—	—		
As Time Goes By	Released: November 4, 2015 (Japan); Label: Avex Trax	—	—	—	—	—	—		
"—" denotes the album failed to chart or not released

=== Singles ===
Title	Year	Peak chart positions					Certifications (sales thresholds)	Album
Title	Year	US	US Pop	US AC	CAN	JPN	Certifications (sales thresholds)	Album
"This Christmas"^{[A]}	2006	—	—	21	—	—		Non-album single
"Wait for You"^{[B],[C]}	2007	13	5	4	22	3	RIAA: Platinum; RIAJ: Gold	Elliott Yamin
"One Word"^{[D]}	2007	—	—	—	—	—		Elliott Yamin
"Real Love" (with Katharine McPhee)	2008	—	—	—	—	—		Randy Jackson's Music Club, Vol. 1
"Home"	2008	—	—	—	—	91		Wait for You Premium Edition (Japan)
"In Love with You Forever"	2008	—	—	—	—	79		Wait for You Premium Edition (Japan)
"Warm Me Up"	2008	—	—	—	—	—		My Kind of Holiday
"Fight for Love"	2009	—	80	—	—	—		Fight for Love
"You Say"	2009	—	—	—	—	8		Fight for Love
"Can't Keep on Loving You (From a Distance)"	2009	—	—	27	—	—		Fight for Love
"3 Words"	2011	—	—	24	—	—		Gather 'Round/Let's Get to What's Real
"Self Control"	2013	—	—	—	—	—		Let's Get to What's Real

=== Other songs ===
Title	Year	Peak chart positions			Album
Title	Year	US	US Pop	US Bubbling	Album
"Moody's Mood for Love"^{[E]}	2006	—	73	1	American Idol Season 5: Encores
"Movin' On"^{[F]}	2007	61	49	—	Elliott Yamin
"Quiet Storm" (Big Planz featuring Elliot Yamin)	2007	—	—	—	The Storm EP
"Troubling Storm" (Big Planz featuring Elliot Yamin)	2007	—	—	—	The Storm EP
"Sudden Storm" (Big Planz featuring Elliot Yamin)	2007	—	—	—	The Storm EP
"Can You Feel the Love Tonight"	2008	—	—	—	DisneyMania 6
"Shelter" (Steven Russell Harts featuring Joe Little, Al B. Sure!, Keith Washington, Elliott Yamin & Howard Hewitt)	2014	—	—	—	Shelter Deluxe: Steven & Friends EP
"Take Me to the River" (Rick Braun featuring Elliott Yamin, Euge Groove)	2014	—	—	—	Can You Feel It
"Wildflower" (Euge Groove featuring Elliott Yamin)	2014	—	—	—	Got 2 Be Groovin'
"Obvi" (Sanjoy featuring Elliott Yamin)	2017	—	—	—	—N/a
"Victim of Love" (Sanjoy featuring ARS, Stephen Rezza and Elliott Yamin)	2017	—	—	—	—N/a

Notes

- A Yamin's cover of Donny Hathaway's song "This Christmas" was originally released as a single online to AOL Music and iTunes on December 6, 2006. The rendition was later included on Sounds of the Season: The Elliott Yamin Holiday Collection, released in October 2007. Although the song was first released in 2006, it achieved its peak Billboard chart position in January 2008.
- B "Wait for You" was the first official single released from Yamin's self-titled debut. It premiered on radio on March 1, 2007, and was released to iTunes on March 13, 2007. The song was added to Z100 NYC's (the most listened radio station in the U.S.) Top 40 list in late May 2007, making Yamin one of the few independent artists to be played on that radio station.
- C "Wait for You" has been included in the Now That's What I Call Music! 25 collection, the Radio Disney Jams, Vol. 10 compilation, and the Kidz Bop 13 album. The Jason Nevins GTR Mix of the song has been included on Ultra.2008, a collection of dance club remixes. An instrumental version of the song has also been included in the Strung Out Vol. 2: The String Quartet Tribute to Modern Rock Hits album.
- D On August 16, 2007, Yamin announced his second radio single, "One Word", on Fox 5 News in Washington, DC. It was released to radio on October 16, 2007.
- E "Moody's Mood for Love" was not released as a standard single in the U.S.; no songs from the American Idol Season 5: Encores CD were made available as singles for radio airplay. The chart position was attained strictly from sales of the individual track from various Internet music download sites.
- F "Movin' On" was not released as a single, but rather as a pre-album track made available to U.S. online music retailers on February 13, 2007.

=== Music videos ===
Title	Year	Director	Ref.
"Wait for You"	2007	Nick Spanos	
"One Word"	2007	Shaun Peterson	
"Fight for Love"	2009	Nick Spanos	
"You Say"	2009	Nick Spanos	
"3 Words"	2012	Chan Andre	
"Self Control"	2013	Keith Rivers	
