= Fight for Love (Elliott Yamin album) =

Studio album by Elliott Yamin
- Released: May 5, 2009
- Length: 45:56
- Labels: Hickory; RED
- Producers: Josh Abraham; Busbee; Jermaine Dupri; Eman; Espionage; Warren "Oak" Felder; Calvin "Joonie" Gray, Jr.; Rob Knox; Madd Scientist; Midi Mafia; Tawgs Salter; Stargate

Elliott Yamin chronology
Elliott Yamin (2007)	Fight for Love (2009)	Gather 'Round (2011)

Singles from Fight for Love
- 1. "Fight for Love" Released: 2009; 2. "You Say" Released: 2009; 3. "Can't Keep on Loving You (From a Distance)" Released: 2009

Fight for Love is the studio second album by American singer Elliott Yamin. It was first released on May 5, 2009, by the independent label Hickory Records and distributed through Sony BMG-owned RED Distribution. Yamin recorded 35 songs from which to choose the final track list and worked with various producers including Jermaine Dupri, Dave Tozer, Eman, Harvey Mason, Jr., Steve Russell and Stargate. He described Fight for Love as more contemporary R&B pop than his debut with three or four more "radio-friendly" singles. Yamin co-wrote the majority of songs for the album, including "Someday," a song about his feelings of loss following the death of his mother to which he dedicated Fight for Love.

Several singles were issued in support of the album. The title track and lead single premiered on AOL Music on February 13, 2009. The song was released to online music services, including iTunes, and for adds at Top 40 and Rhythmic radio on March 10, 2009. Yamin shot two music videos, for "Fight for Love" as well as for the song "You Say", which became the second single in Japan. They were shot on April 11 and 12, 2009, in Los Angeles, California. The video for "Fight for Love" premiered on AOL Music on May 1, 2009. The second US single, "Can't Keep on Loving You (From a Distance)", was released to Adult Contemporary radio on August 10, 2009.

== Critical reception ==
Professional ratings
Review scores
Source	Rating
About.com	4/5 stars
AllMusic	2.5/5 stars
Billboard	(positive)
People	2.5/4 stars
Slant	1.5/5 stars
US Magazine	2/4 stars

AllMusic editor Stephen Thomas Erlewine rated the album two and a half stars out of five. He found that "the problem for Yamin is that his husky voice bristles against the cold, sequenced rhythms that comprise Fight for Love, creating not tension but dissonance. Of course, it would help if he had compelling material, either songs or productions, but everything here feels written to convention instead of written to order. Yamin remains an ingratiating presence, possessed with a natural, almost accidental charm that's so endearing that it's hard not to wish that he was in warmer surroundings than these, or at least had a better collection of songs to sing." People remarked that the "likable Yamin largely eschews the old-school soul of 2007's self-titled debut for a more contemporary sound. Cuts like the title-track single and the Stargate-produced "Don't Be Afraid" find him smoothly moving in on Ne-Yo. But the songs [...] are not quite in Ne-Yo's league, and the slow-to-midtempo grooves start to blend together after a while."

== Track listing ==
No.	Title	Writer(s)	Producer(s)	Length
1.	"Let Love Be"	Elliott Yamin; Oliver Goldstein; Calvin "Joonie" Gray, Jr.	Gray; Josh Abraham	3:32
2.	"Know Better"	Waynne Nugent; Kevin Risto; Steve Russell; Dapo Torimiro	Midi Mafia; Russell^{[a]}	3:57
3.	"Fight for Love"	Johntá Austin; Terry "Madd Scientist" Thomas	Thomas; Austin^{[b]}	3:41
4.	"You"	P. Taj Jackson; Mikkel S. Ericksen; Tor Erik Hermansen; Amund Bjorklund; Espen Lind	Stargate	3:57
5.	"Can't Keep on Loving You (From a Distance)"	Tawgs Salter; Hakim Abdulsamad; Nasri Atweh; M. Kasprzyk	Salter	3:14
6.	"Don't Be Afraid"	Jackson; Eriksen; Hermansen	Stargate	4:03
7.	"You Say"	Yamin; Reed Vertelney; Lindy Robbins; Jess Cates	Emanuel Kiriakou	3:41
8.	"Apart from Me"	Yamin; Nugent; Risto; Russell; Torimiro	Midi Mafia; Russell^{[a]}	3:42
9.	"Cold Heart"	Yamin; Felix Bloxsom; Aaron Goldstein; O. Goldstein; Bonnie McKee	Abraham; Oligee^{[b]}	3:34
10.	"How Do I Know"	Yamin; Emanuel Kiriakou; Robbins	Kiriakou	3:48
11.	"This Step Alone"	Yamin; Abraham; Alex James; Torimiro	Abraham; Torimiro^{[b]}	3:48
12.	"Someday"	Yamin; Dave Tozer; Marcus John Bryant; Corey Latif Williams	Tozer	5:16

Walmart bonus tracks
No.	Title	Writer(s)	Producer(s)	Length
13.	"The Bridge Is Burning"	Yamin; Marshall Altman; Mike Busbee	Altman; Busbee	3:50
14.	"Don't Change"	Bjorklund; Lind; Geir Hvidsten; Jackson	Espionage	3:26

iTunes Store bonus tracks
No.	Title	Writer(s)	Producer(s)	Length
13.	"Doorway"	James Fauntleroy; Rob Knox; Harvey Mason, Jr.	Knox; The Underdogs	3:47
14.	"Forever in You"	Yamin; Fauntleroy; Nugent; Torimiro; Risto	Midi Mafia	3:37

Japanese edition bonus tracks
No.	Title	Writer(s)	Producer(s)	Length
13.	"Forever in You"	Yamin; Fauntleroy; Nugent; Torimiro; Risto	Midi Mafia	3:37
14.	"When I'm Gone"	Jermaine Dupri; Crystal Johnson; Manuel Seal, Jr.	Dupri; Seal^{[b]}	3:55
15.	"Don't Change"	Bjorklund; Lind; Hvidsten; Jackson	Espionage	3:26

Japanese premium edition bonus tracks
No.	Title	Writer(s)	Producer(s)	Length
16.	"Good Outweigh the Bad"	Yamin; J. Almos; O. Goldstein; McKee; Ely Weisfeld	Abraham	3:49
17.	"The Bridge Is Burning"	Yamin; Marshall Altman; Mike Busbee	Altman; Busbee	3:50
18.	"Always"	Frankie Storm; Mason; Warren "Oak" Felder; Fauntleroy; Russell	Oak; The Underdogs	3:38
19.	"Shelter"	Russell; Priya Jay; Anthony Renoir	Abraham; Russell^{[a]}	3:58

Notes

- ^{^[a]} signifies a vocal producer
- ^{^[b]} signifies a co-producer

== Charts ==
Weekly chart performance
Chart (2009)	Peak position
Japanese Albums (Oricon)	19
US Billboard 200	26
US Independent Albums (Billboard)	4

== Sales ==
Sales for Fight for Love
Region	Certification	Certified units/sales
United States	—	49,000

== Release history ==
Release dates and formats for Fight for Love
Region	Date	Edition(s)	Format(s)	Label(s)	Ref.
United States	May 5, 2009	Standard	CD; digital download	Hickory; RED	
Japan	May 20, 2009	Standard	CD; digital download	Avex Trax	
Japan	October 21, 2009	Premium	CD; digital download	Avex Trax	
