= Diabetes Hands Foundation =

Defunct nonprofit organization

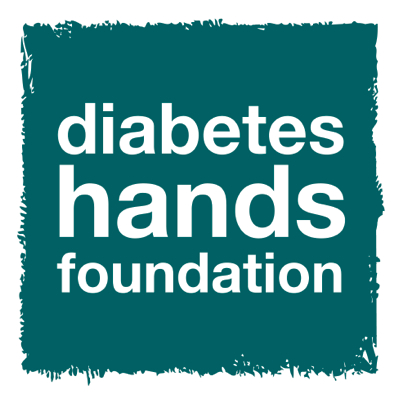
- Founded: March 2008
- Founders: Manny Hernandez, Andreina Davila
- Purpose: "No one touched by diabetes should ever feel alone."
- Location: Berkeley, CA, U.S.
- Region served: Global

Diabetes Hands Foundation was a 501(c)(3) non-profit organization based in Berkeley, California, founded in 2008. It was funded through sponsorship income, donations, grants, and earned income. Diabetes Hands Foundation closed in June 2017, nine years from its founding, handing the administration of its online community programming off to fellow nonprofit Beyond Type 1.

== Programs ==
=== Online Communities ===
The Spanish language web site EsTuDiabetes, shut down in 2020 and a corresponding English language web site TuDiabetes were social networks for people touched by diabetes. The sites were established in 2007 as the first social networks for people with diabetes and their families. TuDiabetes and EsTuDiabetes have more than 65,000 registered members and are visited by over 200,000 people per month. Initially built on the Ning platform, both nonprofit online communities were moved to the Discourse platform in 2015 to continue helping patients live with diabetes without feeling alone.

Between 2010 and 2013, Diabetes Hands Foundation partnered with Children's Hospital Boston to develop TuAnalyze (in English) and EsTuAnalisis (in Spanish), two diabetes data collection, mapping, and surveying applications. Members of the online communities could submit their hemoglobin A1C data to be aggregated and displayed on maps. The project's goal was to rapidly survey and better understand populations of people with diabetes through data donations. A research paper detailing the first lessons learned in connection with TuAnalyze was published in the Public Library of Science in 2011, and many other survey results have been published by the Boston research team.

=== Big Blue Test ===

The Big Blue Test was a program started by Diabetes Hands Foundation to raise awareness of the importance of exercise for people with diabetes. The program took place leading up to World Diabetes Day (November 14). It reinforced the importance of exercise in managing diabetes by having participants test their blood sugar, get active, test again, and share the results online. The results typically showed how exercise reduces blood sugar levels for both people with diabetes and people without diabetes. For each Big Blue Test submitted, a donation to a diabetes charity was made to help people with diabetes in need of supplies and/or education.

In 2012, American Idol's Elliott Yamin and The Amazing Race's Nat Strand were integral to the Big Blue Test campaign.

=== Diabetes Advocates ===
Diabetes Advocates is a program that serves as a platform for connecting individuals and organizations that have taken a leadership role in assisting people with diabetes and offered assistance in accurate reporting about diabetes in the media. Many of the program's members have been featured on Health.com and other publications.

== Other Initiatives ==
=== HealthSeeker ===
HealthSeeker was a social game on Facebook aimed at helping people live healthy lifestyles. The game was developed in 2010 by the Diabetes Hands Foundation in collaboration with the Joslin Diabetes Center. Players select missions such as stress-reducing or exercise-inducing activities to complete within a given period of time to help create a healthier lifestyle. In November 2010, the game was made available in Spanish. In June 2011, a HealthSeeker mobile app became available for iPhone and Android users. In late 2012, Diabetes Hands Foundation sold HealthSeeker to Ayogo Health, the original developer of the game.
