= GenomeWeb =

Online genomics news organization

- Industry: Online journalism
- Founded: 1997
- Founder: Dennis Waters
- Headquarters: New York City, New York, United States
- Key people: Ed Winnick (editor-in-chief)
- Website: www.genomeweb.com

GenomeWeb LLC is an online news organization based in New York City, New York. Established in 1997, it aims to report scientific and business news related to genomics.

== History ==
GenomeWeb LLC was founded in 1997 by publishing entrepreneur Dennis Waters. It initially published only two newsletters: BioInform and Agricultural Genomics. Soon afterward, the company launched several more newsletters, as well as a magazine and a set of blogs on their website. By 2011, the company published eight newsletters, a news website, and the print magazine Genome Technology. In September 2019, it was acquired by Crain Communications.
