= Wait for You (Elliott Yamin song) =

Single by Elliott Yamin

from the album Elliott Yamin
- Released: March 13, 2007
- Recorded: 2006
- Genre: Pop; R&B
- Length: 4:21 (Album Version); 3:59 (Radio Edit)
- Label: RED Distribution, Hickory
- Songwriters: Tor Erik Hermansen, Mikkel Eriksen, Taj Jackson
- Producer: Stargate

Elliott Yamin singles chronology
| "Movin' On" (2007) | "Wait for You" (2007) | "One Word" (2007) |

"Wait for You" is a song by former American Idol contestant Elliott Yamin. It is the first official single from his self-titled album Elliott Yamin (following the retail-only promotional hit "Movin' On").

== Song information ==
"Wait for You" is a slow-tempo ballad in C major. He mentions in the song waiting indefinitely for the one he loves to come back to him. Despite the fact she has left him, he insists he knows she still loves him.

== Charts ==
The song debuted on the U.S. Billboard Hot 100 at number 67. After two weeks the song dropped off the chart, but was resurrected by airplay which improved the song's digital sales. The song experienced an increase in popularity after Yamin's performance on American Idol, and went on to become a hit single on multiple charts in the U.S. It rose to #14 in the iTunes Store and #13 on the Hot 100, giving Yamin his first top 20 hit on the chart. It also became a top five hit for Yamin on the Pop 100, Pop 100 Airplay, and on the Hot Adult Contemporary chart. The song enjoyed great radio longevity, staying in the top ten of Mediabase's Mainstream Top 40 chart for four months before finally falling out of the top ten in early October 2007. The song was the 6th most played song of 2007 on Top 40 radio and it was certified Platinum in digital sales on October 16, 2008. U.S. sales as of April 30, 2010 are 1,113,000. In February 2014, the song was retroactively certified Platinum by the RIAJ for 250,000 downloads.

=== Weekly charts ===
| Chart (2007) | Peak position |
|---|---|
| Canada Hot 100 (Billboard) | 22 |
| Japan (Japan Hot 100) | 3 |
| US Billboard Hot 100 | 13 |
| US Adult Contemporary (Billboard) | 4 |
| US Adult Pop Airplay (Billboard) | 13 |
| US Dance Club Songs (Billboard) | 16 |
| US Pop Airplay (Billboard) | 4 |

=== Year-end charts ===
| Chart (2007) | Position |
|---|---|
| US Billboard Hot 100 | 41 |
| US Adult Contemporary (Billboard) | 23 |
| Chart (2008) | Position |
| Japan (Japan Hot 100) | 75 |
| US Adult Contemporary (Billboard) | 15 |

== Reception ==
The song received a positive review from Chuck Taylor of Billboard, complimenting the "rapid-fire, R. Kelly-esque verses [that] adeptly mesh[ed] with [Yamin's] muscular, emotive vocal."

== Music video ==
The music video for the song (directed by Nick Spanos) shows Yamin in a variety of locations reminiscing about his girlfriend who has left him. The video shows Yamin on the beach, in his bedroom, and simply walking on a sidewalk picturing his ex-girlfriend's smiling face, and pleading for her to come back, just like in the lyrics of the song. The video features a recurring close up face shot of Yamin, in a black and white tone. Yamin is also shown in the studio recording the song throughout the video. In the end, his ex-girlfriend finally approaches him on the beach.

The video debuted at number one on VH1's VSpot Top 20 Countdown, and was number one for four consecutive weeks until July 28, 2007, when it went down to #2 with "Hey There Delilah" by Plain White T's in the top spot, but the following week it returned to number one. The video spent 17 weeks on the countdown, which included eight weeks at number one, and was number 19 on VH1's countdown of the Top 40 Videos of 2007.

== Covers, remixes, and compilations ==
Filipino R&B singer Kyla covered the song on her sixth album entitled Heartfelt. In Super Eurobeat Volume 192, a cover version of "Wait for You" was performed by eurobeat artist, Ace. This cover was later featured in Initial D Fifth Stage. Japanese singer Yusaku Kiyama covered this song in 2008, while Yamin covered Kiyama's song, "Home," in exchange.

The Midi Mafia featuring Bruce Waynne remix of "Wait for You" is available on iTunes. The Jason Nevins GTR Mix of the song has been included on Ultra.2008, a collection of dance club remixes. Another remix features the duo Nina Sky.

"Wait For You" has been included in the Now That's What I Call Music! 25 collection and the Radio Disney Jams, Vol. 10 compilation.

"Wait For You" is featured on the soundtrack, 'Wangan Midnight The Movie - Special Driving Style.' (湾岸ミッドナイト THE MOVIE - Special Driving Style) The movie itself is a film adaption of the popular Manga and Anime series, Wangan Midnight which was released in theaters across Japan in September 2009. The song appears as the twelfth track on the album. It is also played in one part when Tatsuya and Eriko go to the gas station.
