= Paul Nguyễn Thanh Hoan =

Vietnamese Catholic bishop (1939–2014)

The Most Reverend Paul Nguyễn Thanh Hoan
- Bishop of Phan Thiết
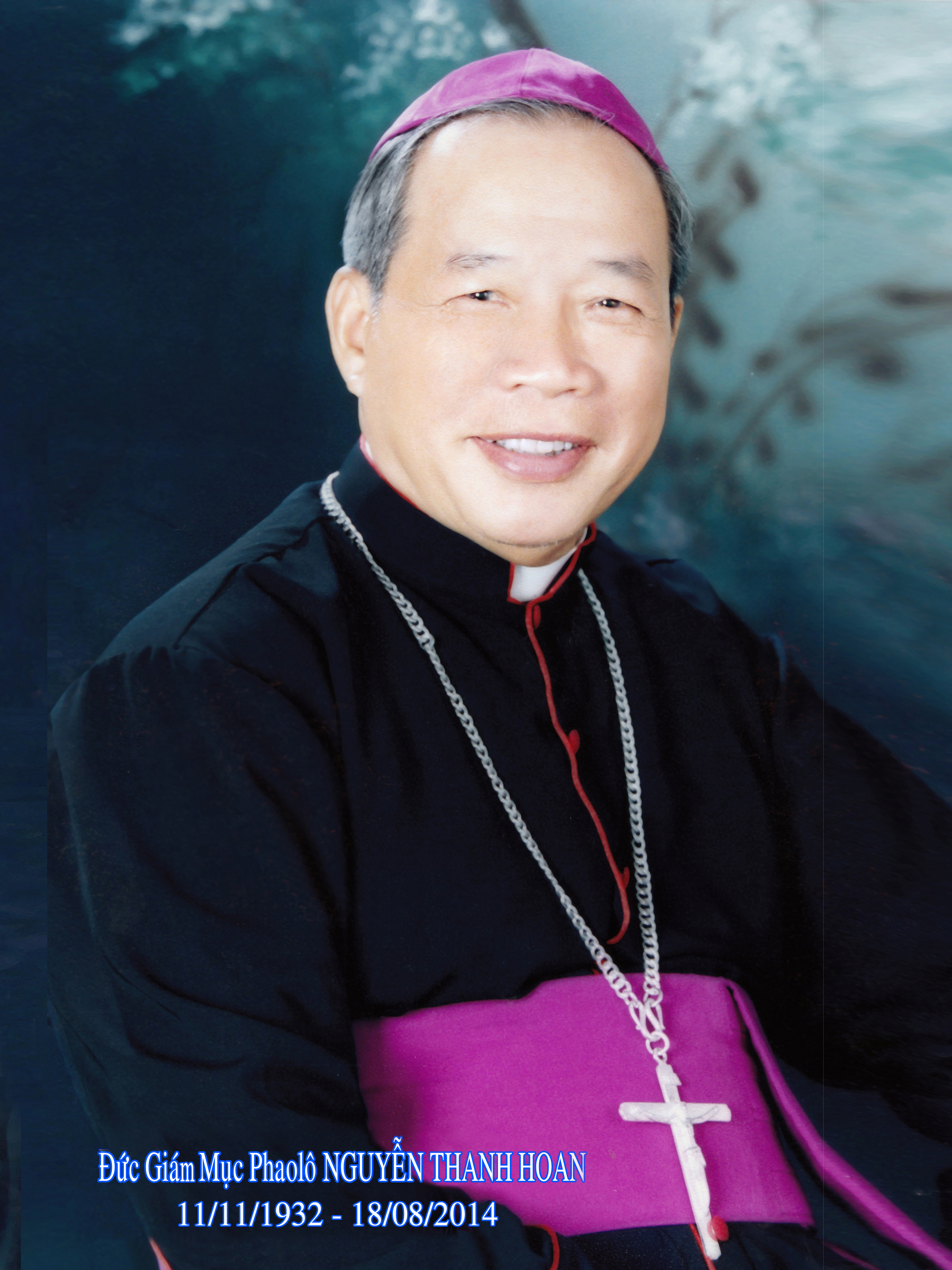
- Native name: Phaolô Nguyễn Thanh Hoan
- Province: Sài Gòn
- See: Phan Thiết
- Installed: 1 April 2005
- Term ended: 25 July 2009
- Predecessor: Nicolas Huỳnh Văn Nghi
- Successor: Joseph Vũ Duy Thống
- Previous posts: Bishop of Phan Thiết (2005-2009); Coadjutor Bishop of Phan Thiết (2001-2005)

Orders
- Ordination: 29 April 1965
- Consecration: 11 August 2001 by Nicolas Huỳnh Văn Nghi

Personal details
- Born: November 11, 1932 Nghệ An
- Died: 18 August 2014 (aged 81) Phan Thiết
- Denomination: Roman Catholic
- Motto: Evangelizare pauperibus Vietnamese: Tin Mừng cho người nghèo khó
- Coat of arms: Paul Nguyễn Thanh Hoan's coat of arms

Paul Nguyễn Thanh Hoan (11 November 1932 – 18 August 2014) was a Vietnamese prelate of the Roman Catholic Church in Vietnam. He served as Coadjutor Bishop (2001–2005) and subsequently as the Diocesan Bishop of the Diocese of Phan Thiết (2005–2009).His episcopal motto was "Evangelizare pauperibus misit me" ("He has sent me to preach the Good News to the poor") or "Evangelizare pauperibus'' ( ''The Gospel to the Poor'' ). Within the Catholic Bishops' Conference of Vietnam, he served as Chairman of the Committee for Charity and Social Affairs – Caritas for two consecutive terms, from 2001 to 2007.

Born in Nghệ An in 1932 into a Catholic family, Nguyễn Thanh Hoan began his religious vocation at the age of 12. Following a period of migration and studies at several Catholic seminaries, he was ordained a priest in Saigon in April 1965.

Known for his strong commitment to Christian charity, the newly ordained priest was appointed as assistant parish priest and head of the Paris Foreign Missions Society (MEP) mission in Đông Hà, Quảng Trị. After a relatively short period, owing to the severe fighting in the demilitarized zone during the Vietnam War, Father Hoan relocated the people under his care, along with a large number of parishioners, to Hàm Tuy (now part of Bình Thuận Province). There, he was appointed parish priest of Bồ Câu Trắng, a parish he had founded. He organized numerous charitable activities and worked to improve the living conditions of local residents regardless of their religious affiliation.

With the agreement of the Holy See and the Vietnamese government, Father Nguyễn Thanh Hoan, despite his advanced age, was appointed Coadjutor Bishop of Phan Thiết. His appointment was announced in mid-July 2001, and his episcopal consecration took place on 11 August of the same year. After serving as coadjutor bishop for four years, he succeeded to the office of Diocesan Bishop in April 2005. He retired in July 2009 upon reaching the retirement age.

Bishop Nguyễn Thanh Hoan died in August 2014 at the Social Charity Congregation (Tu đoàn Bác Ái Xã Hội).

== Early life and education ==
Bishop Nguyễn Thanh Hoan was born on 11 November 1932 (although Holy See records give his year of birth as 1939) in Phi Lộc Parish, Diocese of Vinh, located in Minh Châu Commune, Nghệ An Province. He was the eighth of nine sons in his family. His parents were Paul Nguyễn Bá Linh and Mary Vũ Thị Đa.

On 13 August 1944, his family enrolled the young Hoan at Tập Xuân Phong School. Three years later, in August 1948, Nguyễn Thanh Hoan entered Xã Đoài Minor Seminary. In 1954, he was subsequently transferred to the Migrant Minor Seminary.

After completing his studies, he taught at St. Peter Nguyễn Khắc Tự Major Seminary in Thủ Đức (the relocated Vinh Seminary) from 1957 to 1959. In August 1959, seminarian Nguyễn Thanh Hoan continued his ecclesiastical studies by enrolling at the Saint-Sulpice Major Seminary, studying in Thị Nghè (Saigon), Huế, and Vĩnh Long.

Styles of Paul Nguyen Thanh Hoan
- Reference style: His Excellency
- Spoken style: Your Excellency
- Informal style: Bishop

== Priesthood ==
Nguyễn Thanh Hoan was ordained a priest on 29 April 1965 at the Notre-Dame Cathedral Basilica of Saigon. Following his ordination, the young priest was appointed assistant parish priest of Đông Hà, Quảng Trị. Owing to his strong commitment to social charity, he was also appointed head of the Paris Foreign Missions Society (MEP) mission in Đông Hà.

In 1966, one year after his ordination, Nguyễn Thanh Hoan was appointed head of the Cultural and Social Programme of the Archdiocese of Huế. Two years later, with the approval of Archbishop Philippe Nguyễn Kim Điền, Father Hoan established and served as principal of the Đắc Lộ (Alexandre de Rhodes) Orphanage and Private Upper Secondary School, providing assistance to orphaned children affected by the war in the demilitarized zone.

In 1968, Father Paul Hoan graduated from the Faculty of Arts at the University of Huế with a Bachelor of Arts degree in Philosophy. In the same year, following the Tet Offensive, Father Hoan established a charitable home called "White Dove Family" (Gia đình Bồ Câu Trắng), which provided shelter for victims of the war.

In 1972, amid the intense fighting of the Easter Offensive in Quảng Trị, he relocated the Đắc Lộ School and 202 orphaned children from Quảng Trị to Bình Tuy (now part of Hàm Tân District, Bình Thuận Province), where he established the White Dove Children's Village. Approximately 300,000 Catholics and members of the White Dove Family also accompanied the migration.

In 1978, after the new Vietnamese government took over the school facilities and children's village, Father Hoan was reassigned to serve as parish priest of Bồ Câu Trắng Parish, now known as Thánh Linh Parish.

In the late 1980s, while visiting his hometown of Phi Lộc Parish in the Diocese of Vinh, Father Nguyễn Thanh Hoan encountered numerous impoverished families living on fishing boats. He subsequently invited them to relocate with him to Tân Hà Commune, Hàm Tân District, Bình Thuận Province, despite the considerable hardships involved.

Beginning in 1994, Father Hoan organized numerous charitable and social welfare programmes aimed at poverty alleviation, while also conducting missionary activities among impoverished rural communities. He travelled extensively on an old Honda Cub 81 motorcycle, whose loose turn signals were nearly falling off. Through his charitable work, he became widely known among the residents of Tân Hà Commune, Hàm Tân District, Bình Thuận Province.

His social assistance programmes served people regardless of religious affiliation. These initiatives included drilling wells to provide clean water, improving village roads, constructing charitable housing, extending electricity networks to rural settlements, and supporting agricultural development through livestock credit programmes, known as "credit pigs and cattle". He also oversaw the construction of irrigation dams and established free traditional medicine clinics. Many local residents subsequently converted to Catholicism.[9]

One of his notable social projects was the construction of a large water reservoir and dam to provide irrigation for more than 100 hectares of agricultural land belonging to approximately 300 families. The project was funded by a German charitable community.

From 1999 to 2001, Father Nguyễn Thanh Hoan served as Dean of the Hàm Tân Deanery.

== Bishop ==
=== Coadjutor Bishop of Phan Thiết ===
On July 14, 2001, Father Paul Nguyễn Thanh Hoan was appointed by the Holy See as Coadjutor Bishop of the Diocese of Phan Thiết, with the right of succession.

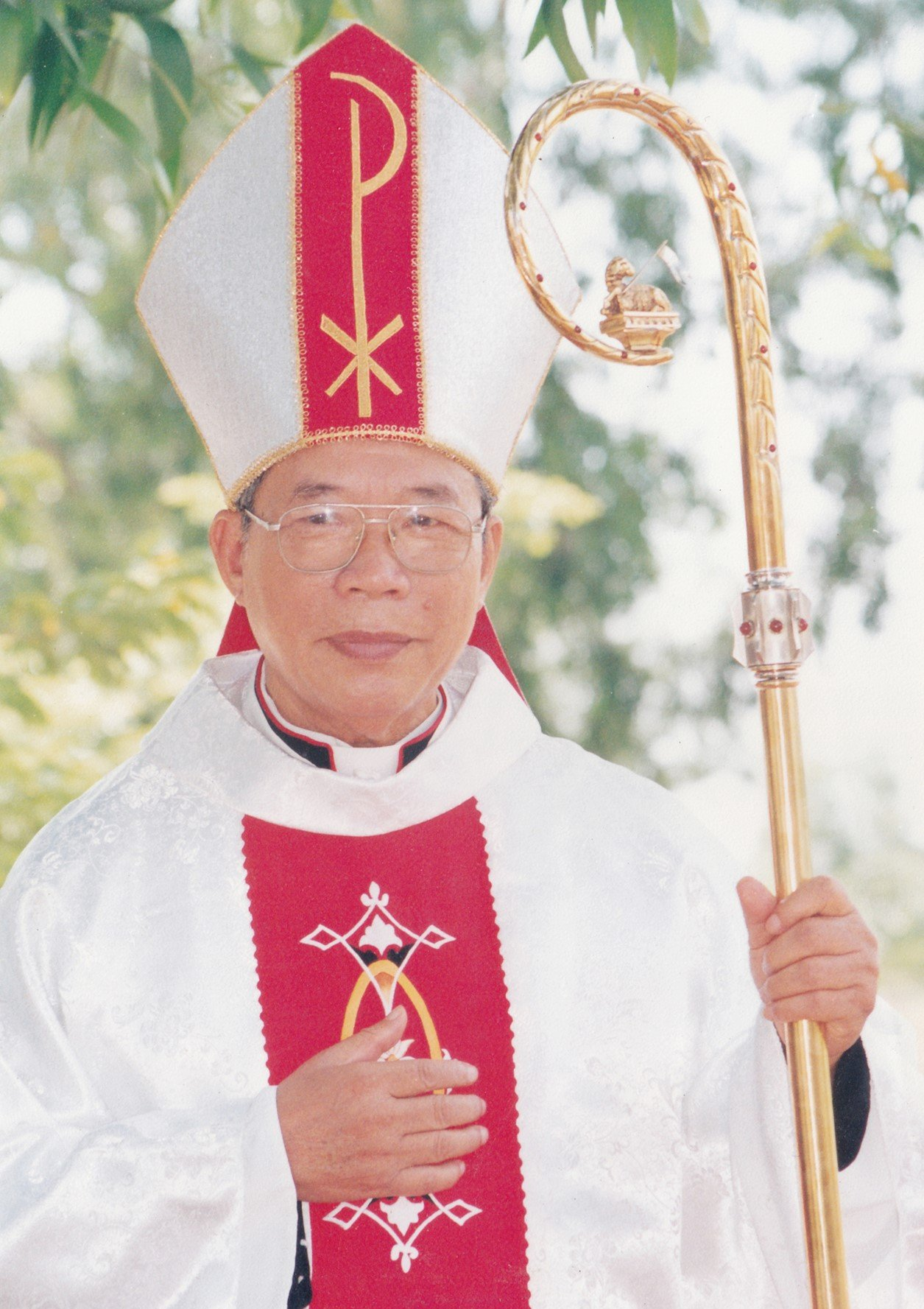
The newly appointed Bishop Paul Nguyễn Thanh Hoan in 2001.

In the same round of appointments, the Holy See also appointed two other new bishops: Joseph Hoàng Văn Tiệm as Bishop of the Diocese of Bùi Chu, and Joseph Vũ Duy Thống as Auxiliary Bishop of the Archdiocese of Ho Chi Minh City.

The newly appointed bishops were the outcome of a round of negotiations held in June of the same year between the Vatican and the Vietnamese government.In addition to the aforementioned appointments, which had received the Vietnamese government's approval of the Holy See's nominations, the government had previously rejected candidates for the position of Archbishop of Hanoi, a candidate for Bishop of the Diocese of Hưng Hóa (which had been vacant since 1992), and a candidate for the Diocese of Hải Phòng, whose episcopal see had been vacant for three years.

The episcopal ordination of the newly appointed Bishop Nguyễn Thanh Hoan was subsequently celebrated on August 11 of the same year. The principal consecration rites were presided over by the principal consecrator, Bishop Nicholas Huỳnh Văn Nghi, Bishop of Phan Thiết, assisted by two co-consecrators: Bishop Peter Nguyễn Văn Nhơn, Bishop of the Diocese of Đà Lạt, and Bishop Thomas Nguyễn Văn Trâm, Auxiliary Bishop of the Diocese of Xuân Lộc.

His episcopal motto was "The Gospel to the Poor."

On September 19, 2001, the Committee for Charitable and Social Activities was established during the Eighth Plenary Assembly of the Catholic Bishops' Conference of Vietnam. The newly established committee appointed Bishop Paul Nguyễn Thanh Hoan as its chairman. However, the committee did not officially begin its charitable and relief activities until after its meeting on September 26, 2002.

Bishop Nguyễn Thanh Hoan, accompanied by the secretary-priest of the Ecclesiastical Province of Saigon, attended the World Congress of the Pontifical Council for Justice and Peace, held for the first time in Rome from October 27 to 30, 2004.

On December 29, 2004, with the approval of Bishop Nicholas Huỳnh Văn Nghi, Bishop Nguyễn Thanh Hoan established the Congregation of Charity and Social Activities, now known as the Servant Brothers of Christ the Servant (male branch) and the Servant Sisters of Christ the Servant (female branch), with the aim of assisting the poor.

=== Bishop of Phan Thiết ===
On April 1, 2005, the Holy See announced that it had accepted the retirement of Bishop Nicholas Huỳnh Văn Nghi and appointed Bishop Nguyễn Thanh Hoan as the new Bishop of the Diocese of Phan Thiết, Vietnam. Four days later, he officially assumed his new position.

On May 13 of the same year, he presided over the groundbreaking ceremony for a church dedicated to Our Lady of Tà Pao.[15] To facilitate visits by the faithful and pilgrims to the statue of Our Lady of Tà Pao, on August 13, 2006, he presided over the groundbreaking ceremony for a road leading up Mount Tà Pao and the Our Lady of Tà Pao Pilgrimage Center. More than one million people, regardless of religious affiliation, attended the Mass.

In early October 2006, Typhoon Xangsane devastated nine provinces and cities in central Vietnam. The accompanying floods and destruction caused numerous deaths and extensive property damage. In response, the Committee for Charitable and Social Activities of the Catholic Bishops' Conference of Vietnam, chaired by Nguyễn Thanh Hoan, called on Catholics to make donations to support the victims. Local diocesan Caritas organizations raised a total of more than VND 500 million to assist those affected, regardless of their religious affiliation. During this relief effort, the committee also provided VND 100 million each to the dioceses of Kon Tum and Đà Nẵng.

On October 24, 2007, a group of individuals wearing military uniforms demolished Sông Mao Church, located in Hải Ninh Commune, Bắc Bình District, Bình Thuận Province. The church was completely destroyed, with only two auxiliary structures—the bell tower and the grotto of Our Lady—remaining.

In response to the incident, on October 31, Bishop Nguyễn Thanh Hoan sent a letter to various provincial and local government authorities in Bình Thuận, including the Provincial People's Committee, the Provincial People's Council, and the Provincial Committee for Religious Affairs, expressing his objections to the demolition. Bishop Hoan stated that the clergy, religious members, and Catholic faithful were deeply distressed by the incident.

In his letter, Bishop Hoan argued that the demolition of Sông Mao Church was unlawful because the property was still subject to a dispute and, according to him, no official document authorizing its expropriation had been issued. He further maintained that the incident contradicted the government's religious policies, disregarded the religious community's ownership rights over its places of worship, and offended the feelings of the Catholic faithful.

Nguyễn Thanh Hoan also asserted that the use of military personnel to demolish the church was intended to intimidate the religious community. In response, he called for the preservation of the site in its existing condition and raised several questions concerning which authority had ordered the demolition, the apparent difference in the handling of the church and a Buddhist temple facing similar legal circumstances, and the timeframe for resolving the church's legal status and addressing the religious needs of the Catholic community in Sông Mao.

On January 8, 2008, Bishop Nguyễn Thanh Hoan issued a pastoral letter concerning Catholic faith and doctrine. Citing numerous incidents over the preceding five years that had caused confusion among the faithful, affected their religious lives, and undermined unity within the Church, he addressed the bishop's responsibility to safeguard Catholic doctrine.

Drawing upon general criteria established by the Holy See's Congregation for the Doctrine of the Faith, Bishop Hoan declared that several alleged supernatural occurrences did not meet the Roman Catholic Church's criteria for recognition as miracles. These included the alleged Eucharistic Miracle at Tánh Linh Church (2002), Exorcism Miracle at Tánh Linh Church (2002), Bleeding Sacred Heart Miracle at Phước An Parish (2007), Healing of a Person with a Paralyzed Leg at Thánh Linh Parish (2007), and other similar incidents.

In mid-March 2008, Bishop Hoan participated in the National Conference on Catholic Social Teaching and Charitable and Social Activities, held on the grounds of the Xuân Lộc Episcopal Residence, where he delivered an address.

Bishop Hoan observed that Catholic clergy and religious in Vietnam had not devoted sufficient attention to charitable activities (referred to as charity in Catholic terminology) when living out their vows of chastity, obedience, and poverty. He also acknowledged that he himself had not given the matter adequate attention. He argued that recipients of charitable assistance should not be encouraged to convert to Catholicism and expressed his desire for charitable activities to be organized and systematized in the same manner as pastoral and evangelization programs.

On October 22 and 23, 2008, he participated in the inaugural conference of Caritas Vietnam. On the first day of the conference, Bishop Hoan delivered a speech entitled Caritas and Human Life. On April 1, 2009, he attended the inauguration of Caritas Phan Thiết Diocese, which became the first diocese in Vietnam to implement the diocesan-level Caritas model.

From June 21 to July 4, 2009, Bishop Nguyễn Thanh Hoan participated in an ad limina visit to the Holy See in Vatican City alongside other Vietnamese bishops. While in Rome, on June 27, he attended an audience with Pope Benedict XVI, together with the Vietnamese episcopal delegation.

The Holy See accepted Bishop Nguyễn Thanh Hoan's resignation effective July 25, 2009, and appointed his successor, Joseph Vũ Duy Thống, formerly Auxiliary Bishop of the Archdiocese of Ho Chi Minh City. Following his retirement, Bishop Hoan resided at the Congregation of Charity and Social Activities.

July 25 also marked the anniversary of the episcopal consecrations of Huỳnh Văn Nghi and Nguyễn Thanh Hoan. Bishop Hoan explained that, despite his advanced age, he had decided to assume leadership of the diocese, even if only for a relatively short period, because reaching an agreement between the Vietnamese government and the Catholic Church had been extremely difficult. He expressed happiness that his successor was a younger bishop.

Bishop Nguyễn Thanh Hoan died at the Congregation of Charity and Social Activities at midnight on August 18, 2014, at the age of 82. His funeral was held on August 21, presided over by his successor, Bishop Joseph Vũ Duy Thống, and attended by 14 bishops and more than 200 priests from various dioceses.

== Contributions ==
Bishop Nguyễn Thanh Hoan was recognized for his extensive charitable and social welfare activities. His initiatives included assisting local residents regardless of religious affiliation through the drilling of clean-water wells, widening village roads, constructing numerous charitable houses, and extending electricity networks to remote villages. He also established clean-water facilities serving impoverished communities, provided transportation for students, and created scholarship and assistance funds for students from rural areas.

In addition, he supported agricultural development through initiatives such as livestock microcredit programs providing pigs and cattle, the construction of irrigation dams, and the establishment of free traditional medicine clinics. He also participated in initiatives providing agricultural land, as well as free food and medicine to more than 4,000 patients each month.

Among his most notable irrigation projects was a dam providing water for approximately 100 hectares of agricultural land, which was equally distributed among 300 farming families cultivating rice.

He also invested capital in small-scale local business projects, including the cultivation of plants used in traditional medicine, small pig farms, and other small enterprises. Through these initiatives, he reportedly provided support and employment opportunities for more than 150,000 workers.

Bishop Hoan was also the founder of the two branches of the Congregation of Charity and Social Activities, comprising male and female members. The congregation was established to continue his work in charitable and social services.

As of 2014, the congregation had collaborated with municipal authorities to assist 239 impoverished families by providing them with small-scale credit packages. These charitable initiatives were recognized by local authorities.
