= MedHelp =

MedHelp International
- Type: Private
- Industry: Healthcare, Internet
- Founded: Melbourne, Florida, United States (February 14, 1994)
- Headquarters: San Francisco, California, United States
- Key people: Cindy Thompson, Co-Founder; Phil Garfinkel, Co-Founder; Francis deSouza, Chairman; John deSouza, CEO; Khaled Hassounah, VP of Engineering
- Products: "Ask an Expert" forums, "Medical Communities" support forums, "Health Topics" medical dictionary, "MedTalk" doctor blogs
- Website: www.medhelp.org

MedHelp was an American private corporation that was founded in February 1994 and pioneered the field of consumer health information and communities on the Internet, before WebMD, Microsoft or Yahoo!. Co-founded by Cindy Thompson and Phil Garfinkel, the company partners with doctors and medical research institutions to deliver online discussion boards and personal health applications.

== Overview ==
MedHelp partners with doctors from hospitals and medical research institutions to deliver online discussion boards on healthcare topics. The company's slogan is "Finding Cures Together."

In December 2008, MedHelp was ranked 3,090 in the Alexa Internet 3 month traffic rankings of all sites on the web and gets over 7 million unique visitors each month.

== History ==
The founders of MedHelp, Cindy Thompson and Phil Garfinkel, met in December 1993, while conducting research in CompuServe's Med-Sig Forum. Both had family members that had struggled with life-threatening illnesses. They discussed the difficulties they encountered in obtaining medical information in lay terminology. Cindy mentioned that one of her dreams was to create a service where patients would be able to contact leading physicians and scientists, who could answer specific questions, in lay terminology, regarding their diagnoses. Based on that vision, they incorporated the company on February 14, 1994 and launched the MedHelp bulletin board system (BBS) on April 1, 1994 with a 386 computer, two modems, and two phone lines.

In 1995, MedHelp updated its BBS so that it could also be accessed by the emerging Web browsers. At that point, only a handful of institutions such as the University of Iowa and Columbia University School of Medicine delivered health information on the Internet. The National Cancer Institute had an FTP presence, but not a Web presence.

By August 1995, MedHelp had about 38,000 visitors a month. MedHelp continued to grow and by January 2009, MedHelp was getting over 6 million unique visitors monthly.

== Operation ==
=== Forums ===
MedHelp hosts 3 types of forums - "Ask a Doctor" forums, "Health Communities" forums and "International Forums" on healthcare topics such as Addiction, Allergy, Cancer, Cosmetic Surgery, Dental, Dermatology, Disaster Preparedness, Ear Nose & Throat, Fitness, Gastroenterology, Gynecology, Heart, Hepatitis, HIV, Neurology, Orthopedics, Pain Management, STD, Weight Loss, Women's Health, Pet Health and Urology. The forums are moderated by MedHelp. In the "Ask a Doctor" forums, users can ask questions to medical specialists from MedHelp's partner institutions like the American Academy of Ophthalmology, Partners HealthCare, The Cleveland Clinic Foundation, National Jewish Medical & Research Center, Juvenile Diabetes Research Foundation, Johns Hopkins, drugstore.com and Mount Sinai Medical Center.

The "Ask a Doctor" forum has been shut down since June 2014; MedHelp has not indicated whether or not they plan to reactivate it.

In the "Health Communities" forums, users post questions, comments and get responses and support from other users.

=== Personal Health Applications ===
MedHelp offers a series of Personal Health Applications, including Personal Health Records and Trackers, interactive tools to allow users to manage various conditions and goals such as Weight Management, Exercise, Diabetes, Sleep, Mood, Pain, Ovulation and Pregnancy.

=== Revenue model ===
MedHelp states that its business model is advertisement-based, and advertisers can buy ads directly from MedHelp or through partners such as Google.

== See also ==
- Online communities

== Sources ==
- CBS News, Paperless Rx For Better Health; Oct 29, 2007
- The Cleveland Clinic Heart & Vascular Institute
- Consumer Reports HealthRatings.org Top 20 Health Information Websites
- Wall Street Journal, A Guide to Some of the Internet's Best—And Most Overlooked—Health Sites, By Tara Parker-Pope; Eastern edition; Jul 6, 2004; D.1;
- Wall Street Journal, Can't Get In to See That Famed M.D.? Top Docs Now Keep Office Hours Online, By Tara Parker-Pope; The Wall Street Journal; Eastern edition; Jan 7, 2003; D.1;
- Wall Street Journal, Finding Someone Who Feels Your Pain: Matching Services Connect Sick Patients, By Tara Parker-Pope; The Wall Street Journal; Eastern edition; Dec 17, 2002; D.1;
- US Dept. of State's Global Issues Magazine, Med Help International: Where There's a Doctor on the Web, November 2000
- Time Magazine, A Web of Deceit, By Christine Gorman, Health Editor, Monday, Feb. 08, 1999
