= One Word (Elliott Yamin song) =

Single by Elliott Yamin

from the album Elliott Yamin
- Released: October 16, 2007
- Genre: Pop; R&B
- Length: 3:38
- Label: RED Distribution, Hickory Records
- Songwriters: Espen Lind, Amund Bjørklund, Mikkel S. Eriksen, Tor Erik Hermansen, Taj Jackson
- Producers: Stargate, Espionage

Elliott Yamin singles chronology
"Wait for You" (2007)	"One Word" (2007)

"One Word" is the second official single from Elliott Yamin's self-titled album Elliott Yamin (following his first single "Wait for You" and the radio-only promotional hit "Movin' On")

== Song information ==
"One Word" is a midrange tempo ballad in which Yamin sings about how grateful he is for his love. He sings about how truly amazing she is and how much he appreciates everything she has done for him.

The song was confirmed as a single on Fox News in Washington D.C., and was officially released on October 16, 2007.

== Music video ==
The video was confirmed to have been shot in Nashville on October 25, with Shaun Peterson as the director. The release date of the video was November 16, 2007.

Scenes of Yamin singing in a wallpapered room are intercut into the video. There are scenes of Yamin driving through streets and walking on a sidewalk, trying to find the girl he loves, at the same time many signs he pass say "Amazing". At the third verse, he is singing in a totally white room, wearing white clothes and surrounded by a few chandeliers. His lover comes into the room and they kiss. Then the scene of Yamin walking on the sidewalk returns, and he finds his lover and they kiss once again, and separate and smile at each other. Yamin is chasing the girl he loves in this video, opposed to waiting for her, like he did in the "Wait for You" video.
