= Movin' On (Elliott Yamin song) =

Promotional single by Elliott Yamin

from the album Elliott Yamin
- Released: February 27, 2007
- Recorded: 2006
- Genre: Pop, R&B
- Label: RED Distribution, Hickory
- Songwriters: Elliott Yamin, Leor Dimant, Oliver Goldstein, Ely Weisfeld

"Movin' On" is a song by American singer Elliott Yamin from his self-titled debut album. It was released to U.S. online music retailers on February 27, 2007. A preview of the song was released to AOL on February 9.

The song was not released as a single, rather as a pre-album release track. Despite this many fans thought this was the first single, and the song received a large amount of attention and high downloads. The song debuted at #61 on the Billboard Hot 100 for the chart week of 3-17-2007. This is Yamin's first appearance on the chart. He also has a #49 debut on the U.S. Pop charts.

The song talks about getting tired of waiting on someone to want to take the relationship to the next level, and "movin on" to someone else. Elliott described the song as "a really upbeat mid-tempo song that you can dance to", and revealed it had been made before he left the American Idol tour on the summer of 2006 and was the first song recorded.

== Charts ==
Chart (2007)	Peak position
US Billboard Hot 100	61
US Digital Song Sales (Billboard)	37
US Billboard Pop 100	49
