= Taylor Hicks discography =

- Studio albums: 3
- Live albums: 2
- Compilation albums: 1
- Singles: 9
- Music videos: 3

The following article is a complete discography of every album and single released by American pop, soul and blues music artist Taylor Hicks, who won the fifth season of American Idol in 2006.

== Albums ==
=== Studio albums ===
Year	Album details	Peak			Certifications
Year	Album details	US	US Indie	CAN	Certifications
2005	Under the Radar: Release date: May 9, 2005; Label: Independent; Format: CD	—	—	—	US: 17,000
2006	Taylor Hicks: Release date: December 12, 2006; Label: Arista; Format: CD, digital download	2	—	43	US: Platinum; US: 705,000
2009	The Distance: Release date: March 10, 2009; Label: Modern Whomp; Format: CD, digital download	58	5	—	US: 52,000
"—" denotes releases that did not chart

=== Live albums ===
Year	Album	Sales
1997	In Your Time: Release date: 1997; Label: Independent; Format: CD	US: 1,500
2006	The Little Memphis Blues Orchestra with Taylor Hicks "Live at the Workplay Theater", Birmingham, AL, August 7, 2006: Release date: 2006; Label: Independent; Format: CD	

=== Compilation albums ===
Year	Album	Sales
2008	Early Works: Release date: August 12, 2008; Label: Modern Whomp; Format: CD, digital download	US: 4,400

== Singles ==
Year	Title	Peak chart positions				Album
Year	Title	US	US AC	US Pop	CAN	Album
2006	"Do I Make You Proud"	1	14	1	1	Non-album singles
2006	"Takin' It to the Streets"	69	—	—	—	Non-album singles
2007	"Just to Feel That Way"	—	20	—	—	Taylor Hicks
2007	"Heaven Knows"	—	19	—	—	Taylor Hicks
2009	"What's Right Is Right"	—	24	—	—	The Distance
2009	"Seven Mile Breakdown"	—	—	—	—	The Distance
2010	"SOS (Save My Body, Save My Soul)"	—	—	—	—	Non-album singles
2015	"Silent Night"	—	—	—	—	Non-album singles
2017	"Call Paul"	—	—	—	—	Non-album singles
2017	"Six Strings and Diamond Rings"	—	—	—	—	Non-album singles

== Music videos ==
Year	Video	Director	Executive producer
2009	"What's Right Is Right" (Single)	Jake Davis	Kerri Kleiner
2009	"Seven Mile Breakdown" (Single)		Ryan Kohler
2010	"Whomp at the Warfield" (Concert Video)	Eric Cochran	Taylor Hicks
