= Nick Lachey discography =

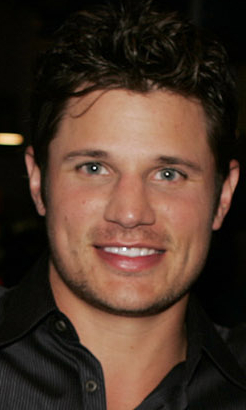
- Studio albums: 4
- Singles: 8
- Music videos: 4

American pop singer Nick Lachey has released four studio albums, eight singles, and four music videos under Motown Records, Universal Records and Jive Records.

Lachey's debut album, SoulO, was released on November 11, 2003, reached number 51 on the US Billboard 200 chart. Two singles were released: "Shut Up" and "This I Swear". However, only the latter charted, where it reached number 11 on the US Billboard Bubbling Under Hot 100 chart.

His second album, What's Left of Me, was released on May 9, 2006. It was a bigger success on the Billboard charts, where it reached a number 2 peak. The title track was released as the first single from the album and it became Lachey's first Top 10 single on the Hot 100. The following single, "I Can't Hate You Anymore", only reached number 87 on the Hot 100. A third and final single, "Resolution" was released, however, it only reached number 77 on the Pop 100 (now the Mainstream Top 40).

In 2009, two more singles were released. They were intended as being the lead singles for an upcoming third studio album, but it was announced in January 2010 that Lachey's label, Jive Records, had put the album on hold indefinitely.

== Albums ==
List of albums, with selected details, chart positions and certifications shown
Title	Album details	Peak chart positions				Certifications (sales threshold)
Title	Album details	US	AUS	IRE	UK	Certifications (sales threshold)
SoulO	Release date: November 11, 2003; Label: Universal	51	—	—	—	
What's Left of Me	Release date: May 9, 2006; Label: Jive	2	13	21	91	RIAA: Gold
A Father's Lullaby	Release date: March 13, 2013; Label: Fisher-Price, Inc./Mood Entertainment	—	—	—	—	
Soundtrack of My Life	Release date: November 11, 2014; Label: Little Nicky	—	—	—	—	

== Singles ==
List of singles, with selected chart positions and certifications shown
Year	Single	Peak chart positions							Certifications	Album
Year	Single	US	US Pop	US Adult	AUS	NZ	SWE	SWI	Certifications	Album
2003	"Shut Up"	—	—	—	—	—	—	—		SoulO
2003	"This I Swear"	— (Note: "This I Swear" did not enter the Billboard Hot 100, but peaked at number 11 on the Bubbling Under Hot 100 Singles chart.)	—	—	—	—	—	—		SoulO
2006	"What's Left of Me"	6	5	14	7	33	13	25	RIAA: Gold; ARIA: Gold	What's Left of Me
2006	"I Can't Hate You Anymore"	87	25	33	33	—	—	—		What's Left of Me
2006	"Resolution"	—	77	—	—	—	—	—		What's Left of Me
2007	"Ordinary Day"	—	—	—	—	—	—	—		Non-album single
2009	"Patience"	—	75	33	—	—	—	—		Non-album single
2009	"All in My Head"	—	—	—	—	—	—	—		Non-album single
2011	"Last One Standing"	—	—	—	—	—	—	—		Non-album single
2017	"Someone to Dance With"	—	—	—	—	—	—	—	"—" denotes releases that did not chart	Non-album single
