= Resolution (Nick Lachey song) =

Single by Nick Lachey

from the album What's Left of Me
- Released: December 12, 2006 (U.S.)
- Recorded: Hollywood, California
- Genre: Acoustic rock (original); Alternative rock (full band)
- Length: 3:49
- Label: Jive
- Songwriters: Nick Lachey; Rob Wells; Lindy Robbins; Jess Cates
- Producer: Rob Wells

Nick Lachey singles chronology
"I Can't Hate You Anymore" (2006)	"Resolution" (2006)	"Ordinary Day" (2007)

"Resolution" is a song by American singer-songwriter Nick Lachey, released as the third and final single from his second solo album What's Left of Me in 2006. An exclusive EP of the song, titled Resolution (Full Band Mix) - EP, was released on iTunes on February 20, 2007. The single went for adds at mainstream radio in January 2007. The song was not released as a full single because Lachey at the time was working on his third studio album (he later released A Father's Lullaby and re-formed 98 Degrees), and as a result the song only peaked #77 on the Billboard Pop 100 and failed to match up to the success of "What's Left of Me". The original version of "Resolution" that appears on What's Left of Me was recorded as a demo, on the day it was written. Jive loved it so much, they insisted on it being the final version on the record.

== Track list ==
Resolution (Full Band Mix) - EP:

1. "Resolution" (full band version)
2. "What's Left of Me" (The Passengerz remix) [radio edit]
3. "What's Left of Me" (Jack D. Elliot remix)

== Chart performance ==
Chart (2006)	Peak position
U.S. Billboard Pop 100	77
