= What's Left of Me =

What's Left of Me may refer to:

- What's Left of Me (album), a 2006 album by Nick Lachey
  - "What's Left of Me" (song), the title track from the album
- What's Left of Me (novel), a 2012 novel by author Kat Zhang
- "What's Left of Me", a 2003 song by Rodney Atkins from the album Honesty (Rodney Atkins album)
