= In Our Time =

In Our Time may refer to:

- In Our Time (1944 film), a film starring Ida Lupino and Paul Henreid
- In Our Time (1982 film), a Taiwanese anthology film featuring director Edward Yang; considered the beginning of the "New Taiwan Cinema"
- In Our Time (short story collection), a collection of short stories by Ernest Hemingway
- In Our Time (Wolfe book), a collection of illustrations by Tom Wolfe
- In Our Time (EP), an EP by Cuff the Duke
- In Our Time (radio series), a BBC discussion programme
- In Our Time, a book by Susan Brownmiller
- In Our Time, a book by William Manchester

== See also ==
- In Your Time, a 1997 album by Taylor Hicks
- Nostra aetate (Latin: "In our time"), the 1965 Declaration on the Relation of the Catholic Church with Non-Christian Religions
- Peace in our time (disambiguation)
