= Deemi =

- Also known as: The Hoodz Princess
- Born: Tahu Aponte
- Origin: Bedford-Stuyvesant, Brooklyn, New York, United States
- Genres: R&B; hip hop; soul
- Occupations: Singer; songwriter; record producer; rapper
- Years active: 2007–present
- Label: Atlantic Records
- Website: Deemi.com

Tahu Jessica Aponte, better known by her stage name, Deemi, is an American singer, songwriter, record producer and rapper.

== Career ==
In 1998, she met producers Chris Styles and Bruce Waynne. The two helped her create a demo. Instead of merely talking about common relationship themes, they instead encouraged her to talk about her own life (including physical abuse at the hands of her father, as well as being the mother of two children prior to turning 21). Eventually she signed to Atlantic through a partnership between organizations run by Styles (Dangerous LLC.) and Waynne (the latter is one half of Midi Mafia).

Her first single is called "Soundtrack of My Life." Her debut album titled the same name, "Soundtrack of My Life" was supposed to be released on July 10, 2007. In "Soundtrack of My Life", she talks about her life story from the relationship with her mother, cutting crack for her boyfriend, and drug and alcohol consumption. Eventually the album was shelved and she left Atlantic.

In 2013, after years of hiatus she resumed her musical career by uploading new songs on her official YouTube account.

== Discography ==
=== Albums ===
2007 Dying Get Rich (MIX CD for streets. released only in Japan)
2007 Soundtrack of My Life (unreleased)

=== Solo singles ===
Year	Song	U.S. Hot 100	U.S. R&B	UK singles	Album
2007	"Soundtrack of My Life" produced by Midi Mafia	–	–	–	"Soundtrack of My Life"
2007	"On the Radio	–	113	–	"Soundtrack of My Life"
2010	"Jump" featuring NORE	–	–	–	"Deemi"
