= Lindy Robbins =

American songwriter

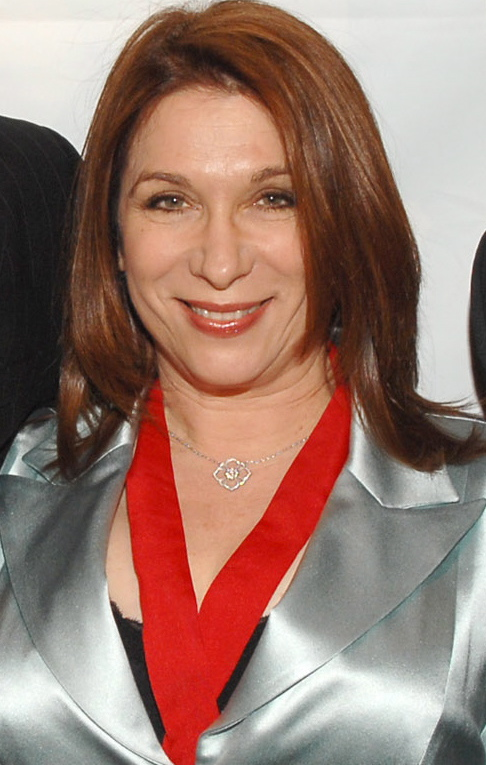
- Robbins in 2007

Background information
- Origin: Los Angeles, California, U.S.
- Genres: Pop; rock; R&B; EDM; country; dance
- Occupation: Songwriter
- Years active: 1997–present
- Website: lindyrobbins.com

Lindy Robbins is an American songwriter from Los Angeles, California. Her songwriting credits includes multiple hit songs, including Demi Lovato's "Skyscraper", Jason Derulo's "Want to Want Me", David Guetta's "Dangerous", MKTO's "Classic", Hot Chelle Rae's "Tonight, Tonight", Jason Derulo's "It Girl" and Astrid S' "Hurts So Good".

== Background ==
Robbins grew up in the San Fernando Valley, California. She started singing with her musician father Wally when she was three years old, and was a performer in New York City and Los Angeles before becoming a full-time songwriter in 1997. Robbins now resides in Los Angeles.

== Career ==
Robbins has written songs for many artists in the music industry.

Number-one hits include: "Want to Want Me" by Jason Derulo, "Dangerous" by David Guetta (feat. Sam Martin), and "Tonight, Tonight" by Hot Chelle Rae. Other chart-toppers include: "Skyscraper" by Demi Lovato, "Classic" by MKTO, "Slow Down", "It Girl", "Miss Movin' On" by Fifth Harmony, "Hurts So Good" by Astrid S, "Day Drunk" by Morgan Evans, and "Crybaby" by Paloma Faith.

Lindy is also known for the following top-five singles: "Incomplete" by the Backstreet Boys, "What's Left of Me" by Nick Lachey, and Cinderella" by The Cheetah Girls.

Additional key releases include songs recorded by: Dua Lipa, Zedd, Bebe Rexha, LeAnn Rimes, One Direction, Jennifer Hudson, Rachel Platten, 5 Seconds of Summer, Jennifer Lopez, Leona Lewis (featuring OneRepublic), Faith Hill, Brandy, Britney Spears, Jason Mraz, Westlife, Shaggy, Jordin Sparks, Lisa Loeb, Clay Aiken, Toni Braxton, Monica, and Audra McDonald.

== Discography ==
2026

Tokio Hotel	Wanderlust	Writer
Allie Sherlock	Trying to Unlove You (single)	Writer
Jamie Hannah	Oblivion (single)	Writer
MONSTA X	Heal (single)	Writer
Matteo Bocelli	Si No Estás Aquí	Writer
North of Dewdney	REMEDY (single)	Writer
KONG.	THE BEST IS YET TO COME. (single)	Writer

2025

Jordin Sparks	Secret Santa (single)	Writer
Toby Gad & Victoria Justice	Blessed	Writer
Toby Gad & Jordin Sparks	Christmas Takes Me Back Home	Writer
Toby Gad & Loren Allred	Wonderful Night	Writer
Toby Gad & Joelle James	Kiss Me for Christmas	Writer
Rondé	Never Been Better (single)	Writer
Miyeon	You and No One Else	Writer
Michael Patrick Kelly	Love Found Us	Writer
Matteo Bocelli	If I Can't Have You	Writer
DASUTT	Love Me More (single)	Writer
Hilary Roberts	Woman to Woman (single)	Writer
Stein Torleif Bjella & Hver gang vi møtes	Om det brenn	Writer

2024

Dark of the Moon: A New Musical (The Sunset Sessions)	The Ballad of Barbara Allen (Part One); Wildflower; Certified Rock Star; Maybe; Under Our Spell; Ordinary Life	Writer, co-producer
Skinny Living	Strawberry Jam (single)	Writer
Klingande & RUG	On or Off (single)	Writer

2023

Naya Rivera & Cast of Glee	Prayer for the Broken (single)	Writer
Sam Fischer	Hard to Love (single)	Writer
KISS OF LIFE	Gentleman	Writer
Stephanie J. Block	Manhattan in December	Writer
Søren Emil	Ghosted	Writer, arranger
Idina Menzel	ROYALTY	Writer
U-KNOW	Spotlight	Writer, producer, arranger
Jeremy Jordan & Cast of Spinning Gold	Greatest Time (Spinning Gold)	Writer
Cafuné	Perspective (single)	Writer
Dark of the Moon: A New Musical	All songs	Writer
Thomas Daniel	Love Me Better (single)	Writer

2022

Aitana	La úItima (single)	Writer
MISIA	Every Wish Deserves a Dream (single)	Writer
Clif Magness	Let Me Let Go	Writer
Onew	Sunshine	Writer

2021

Joyce Cheng	But I'm Not Lonely	Writer
Kelly Clarkson	Blessed	Writer
Rita Wilson	Aftershock	Writer
Faustix, Zookeepers & Alexandra Stan	Future Calling (single)	Writer
Pentatonix	The Lucky Ones (single)	Writer

2020

Dixie D'Amelio feat. Wiz Khalifa	One Whole Day (single)	Writer
Joey McIntyre	Own This Town (single)	Writer
Ben Lesser feat. Emily Vaughn	Letter to the World	Writer
Keith Urban	Say Something	Writer
Matt Simons	Better Tomorrow (single)	Writer
Alice Chater	Pretty in Pink (single)	Writer
McFly feat. Ximena Sariñana	Those Were the Days	Writer
Connell Cruise	Damaged People (single)	Writer
Jasmin Abraha	Make It like It Was (single)	Writer
Ai	Good as Gold	Writer

2019

Backstreet Boys	Passionate	Writer
Backstreet Boys	Is It Just Me	Writer
Austin Mahone	Dancing With Nobody	Writer
Bebe Rexha	Right Here Right Now	Writer
Afrojack, Rae Sremmurd & Stanaj	Sober (single)	Writer
Rita Wilson	Tear By Tear	Writer
Varsity	Od'd	Writer
Billy Stritch	Manhattan in December	Writer
Louis Baker	Alive	Writer

2018

Andra Day	Amen (single)	Writer
MKTO	How Can I Forget (single)	Writer
Morgan Evans	Day Drunk (single)	Writer
Chromeo	One Track Mind (single)	Writer
Max George	Barcelona (single)	Writer
Maddie Poppe	Going Going Gone (single)	Writer
Oli Fox	Cruel (single)	Writer
Westside Cast & Caitlin Ary	Can't Find the Words	Writer
Westside Cast	Westside Finale	Writer
Catherine McGrath	Wild (single)	Writer
Catherine McGrath	I Thought It Was Gonna Be Me (single)	Writer
SKOLES	Berlin (single)	Writer
Keshia Chanté	Lights Out; Freedom	Writer
Skinny Living	I Still Love You (single)	Writer
Mága Jennifer	Til Tomorrow (single)	Writer
Poesy	Soldier of Love (single)	Writer
Don Diablo feat. Betty Who	Higher (single)	Writer
Sam Fischer	Smoke (single)	Writer
Johnnie Mikel	Live While You Can	Writer

2017

Jennifer Hudson	Burden Down (single)	Writer
Rachel Platten	Collide; Thank You for Being a Friend	Writer
DJ Snake feat Lauv	A Different Way (single)	Writer
Paloma Faith	Crybaby (single)	Writer
LeAnn Rimes	Love Is Love Is Love (single)	Writer
Dua Lipa	No Goodbyes	Writer
Pitbull feat Jason Derulo	Educate Ya	Writer
Nashville (season 5) (Season 5: Vol 1)	All of Me	Writer
Kumi Koda	Heartless	Writer
Zuri Star	After All	Writer
Levina	Perfect Life (Official German Eurovision Song)	Writer
Carlos Marco	Saturday Night	Writer
Soul System	Satisfaction	Writer
Johnnie Mikel	Come with Me (single)	Writer
Mads Langer	Unusual (single)	Writer
Citizen Four	Want You Back (single)	Writer
Swallow	Can't Hold Me Down	Writer

2016

Tini Stoessel	Still Standing	Writer
Tini Stoessel	Sigo Adelante	Writer
Jason Derulo	If It Ain't Love (single)	Writer
Astrid S	Hurts So Good (single)	Writer
Daniel Skye	Lovesick Day	Writer
Idina Menzel	Extraordinary	Writer
Olivia Holt	In the Dark	Writer
Alfie Arcuri	Cruel (single)	Writer
Medina	We Survive (single); Liquid Courage	Writer
Kandace Springs	Too Good To Last	Writer

2015

Jason Derulo	Want to Want Me (single)	Writer
Jason Derulo	Cheyenne (single)	Writer
Jason Derulo feat Jennifer Lopez and Matoma	Try Me	Writer
Olly Murs	Kiss Me (single)	Writer
China Anne McClain	Night is Young (Descendants Soundtrack)	Writer
Prince Royce	Handcuffs	Writer
Bea Miller	We're Taking Over	Writer
MKTO	Bad Girls (single)	Writer
Hilary Duff	Outlaw	Writer
Hilary Duff	Night Like This	Writer
Zedd feat Troye Sivan	Papercut	Writer
Zedd	Straight into the Fire	Writer
Abraham Mateo	If I Can't Have You; When You Love Somebody	Writer
Brenna Whitaker	Love Back	Writer
Nova Rockafeller	Made in Gold (single)	Writer
Forever in Your Mind	Whenever	Writer
Borgeous	They Don't Know Us (single)	Writer
Rachel Platten	Superman	Writer
Aubrey Peeples	The Way I Was	Writer
Ace Wilder	Do U Like	Writer
MYNAME	Everlastin' Luv	Writer
Daniel Skye	LoveSick Day (single)	Writer
Haraeki Stage A	paranoia	Writer
Juliana Joya	Looking for Trouble (Peligrosa)	Writer
Lindsey Ray	Save Me	Writer
Monique	Pienk Champagne (single)	Writer
Nina Repeta	Turn Around	Writer
Cold Shoulders	Do Yourself a Favor	Writer

2014

David Guetta feat Sam Martin	Dangerous (single)	Writer
David Guetta feat Trey Songz, Chris Brown and Sam Martin	Dangerous Part 2	Writer
Prince Royce	Perdóname	Writer
Selena Gomez	Mas	Writer
Bella Thorne	Paperweight	Writer
Ella Henderson	Beautifully Unfinished	Writer
Cash Cash	Surrender (single)	Writer
G.R.L.	Don't Talk About Love	Writer
MKTO	Classic (single); American Dream (single); Heartbreak Holiday; Wasted; Goodbye Song	Writer
5 Seconds of Summer	Heartbreak Girl	Writer
5 Seconds of Summer	Wherever You Are	Writer
Britney Spears	Unbroken	Writer
Breathe Carolina feat. Karmin	Bang it Out (single)	Writer
Borgeous	Invincible (single); Wildfire (single)	Writer
Lucy Hale	Kiss Me	Writer
The Vamps	Lovestruck	Writer
Guano Apes	Close to the Sun (single)	Writer
Dove Cameron	Count Me In (single)	Writer
SHINee	Boys Meet U (single)	Writer
Jacky Cheung	It's Not Too Late; Not Bad	Writer
Girls' Generation	Goodbye	Writer
Michael Paynter	Another You	Writer
Tyler James Williams & Coco Jones	Me and You	Writer
Brandon Mychal Smith, Spencer Lee & Tyler James Williams	Tonight's the Night	Writer
Ruben Studdard	Unconditional	Writer
Nikkole	Walking on the Sky; What Love Is; One Track Mind; Just Give Him My Best	Writer
G Hannelius	Friends Do	Writer
KARA	Shake It Up	Writer
Yulianna	Forgiveness; No Looking Back	Writer
Natalia Szroeder	Nie pytaj jak (single)	Writer
Jess Lee	Give Me Love	Writer
Nick Howard	Untouchable	Writer
NRG	Mayday (single)	Writer
Roxanna	Close Your Eyes (single)	Writer
Brooklyn Haley	Crash	Writer

2013

Selena Gomez	Slow Down (single); Undercover	Writer
One Direction	Half a Heart	Writer
Demi Lovato	Fire Starter; Warrior	Writer
Fifth Harmony	Miss Movin' On (single)	Writer
R5	Loud (single); (I can't) Forget About You (single); Fallin For You; One Last Dance; I Want U Bad; Love Me Like That	Writer
Sam Bailey	Skyscraper (single)	Writer
Stooshe	Your Own Kind Of Beautiful; Jimmy	Writer
LIVVIA	Before It Began (single)	Writer
Union J	Beethoven; Save The Last Dance; Where Are You Now; Skyscraper	Writer
Christina Grimmie	Absolutely Final Goodbye	Writer
Nick Lachey	Another Day Is Done; Father's Lullaby; Sleepy Eyes; Little Big Dreamer; Dreamland	Writer
David Archuleta	Nothing Else Better To Do	Writer
Sarah & Pietro	This Is It	Writer
Sara Paxton	How Can I Remember to Forget	Writer
Katy Tiz	Heart (single)	Writer
Jana	That's What Love Is	Writer

2012

One Direction	Summer Love; Truly Madly Deeply; Taken	Writer
Breathe Carolina	Hit and Run (single)	Writer
Big Time Rush	If I Ruled The World (feat. Iyaz) (single); Cover Girl	Writer
Kris Allen	Blindfolded	Writer
Victoria Justice & Victorious Cast	Shut Up and Dance	Writer
Victoria Justice & Ariana Grande	L.A. Boyz	Writer
Leon Thomas III & Victoria Justice	365 Days	Writer
Victoria Justice & Victorious Cast	Here's 2 Us	Writer
Ricki-Lee	Because I Can	Writer
Charlotte Perrelli	Just Not Tonight (single)	Writer
Greyson Chance	Leila; California Sky	Writer
Markéta Poulíčková	Jen jednou (single)	Writer
Youngblood	Tenderly	Writer
Roveena	I Lied (single)	Writer
Stefano	Last Day	Writer
It Boys!	Start the Party (single)	Writer
It Boys! & BC Jean	Torn in Two	Writer
Rachel Crow	My Kind of Wonderful	Writer
YU-A & MYNAME	SWITCH	Writer
Jedward	What It Feels Like	Writer
Monique	By Jou Voel Ek Beautiful; If I Could (500 Tears)	
Kumi Koda	Boom Boom Boys	Writer
Zendaya & Bella Thorne	The Same Heart	Writer
Blush feat. Snoop Dogg	Undivided (single)	Writer

2011

Demi Lovato	Skyscraper (single)	Writer
Jason Derulo	It Girl (single)	Writer
Hot Chelle Rae	Tonight, Tonight (single); I Like it Like That (single feat. New Boyz); Beautiful Freaks; Radio (feat. Bei Major)	Writer
Sophie Ellis-Bextor	Homewrecker	Writer
Javier Colon	Stitch By Stitch (single)	Writer
Days Difference	Down With Me (single)	Writer
David Cook	Hard To Believe	Writer
f(x)	Beautiful Goodbye	Writer
Victoria Justice	All I Want Is Everything (single)	Writer
Matthew Morrison	Don't Stop Dancing	Writer
China Anne McClain	Exceptional	Writer
Bridgit Mendler	Somebody (single)	Writer
Chris Brochu	Don't Ya Wish U Were Us?	Writer
Dia Frampton	Daniel	Writer
Chord Overstreet	Beautiful Girl (single)	Writer
Jedward	Everyday Superstar	Writer
Girls' Generation	You-a-holic	Writer
Tohoshinki	Superstar (single)	Writer
The McClymonts	Rock the Boat	Writer
Debby Ryan	Hey Jessie	Writer
Amanda Stott	Sail On	Writer
Heinz Winckler	Weight of the World; Blindfolded; Wat Jy Nooit Sal Vergeet Nie	Writer
Chrizaan	Spaceman	Writer
Charlize Berg	Sit My Net Saggies Neer; Parachutes & Airplanes	Writer
Elizma Theron & Nicholis Louw	Die Wêreld Is Ons S'n	Writer
Izak Davel	Jys Die Een; Vanaand	Writer
Michael Paynter	Praying for Rain	Writer
Logen Hall	On My Way (single)	Writer
Michael Feinstein & the Carmel Symphony Orchestra	With You	Writer

2010

Selena Gomez and the Scene	A Year Without Rain (single); Intuition	Writer
BoA	Adrenaline	Writer
Lee DeWyze	Live It Up; Dear Isabelle; Brooklyn Bridge; Earth Stood Still	Writer
Big Time Rush	Stuck; I Know You Know (feat. Cymphonique)	Writer
David Archuleta	Parachutes and Airplanes	Writer
Emily Osment	Lovesick (single)	Writer
AJ McLean	Sincerely Yours	Writer
Ryan Star	Unbreak	Writer
Tarja	I Feel Immortal (single)	Writer
The Fireflies	It's Useless (single); Can't Make Me Love You; Break It to My Heart; Tears Run Dry	Writer
Sons of Sylvia	Revelation	Writer
LIVVIA	Promises	Writer
Varsity Fanclub	I'm Your Guy (single)	Writer
Ben Montague	Did You Know It	Writer
Shanna Crooks	Why Can't I	Writer
Tom Jordan	Alive	Writer
Lipstick	Piosenka o zapominaniu	Writer

2009

Leona Lewis (feat. OneRepublic)	Lost Then Found	Writer
Demi Lovato	Here We Go Again (single); Everything You're Not	Writer, background vocals
Westlife	No More Heroes	Writer
Gloriana	The World is Ours Tonight (single); Come and Save Me	Writer
Selena Gomez and the Scene	More; I Don't Miss You At All; I Promise You	Writer, background vocals
Jordin Sparks	Let it Rain; Papercut; Emergency (911); Faith; Average Girl	Writer
Kris Allen	Before We Come Undone; Can't Stay Away; I Need to Know; From the Ashes	Writer
Ashley Tisdale	Me Without You	Writer, background vocals
Mitchel Musso	Get Out	Writer
Kate Voegele	Who Are You Without Me	Writer
Sweetbox	When Will It Be Me; These Dayz	Writer
Bowling for Soup	I Just Wanna Be Loved	Writer
The Friday Night Boys	Permanent Heartbreak; Suicide Sunday; She's Finding Me Out; Can't Take That Away; Hollow; The First Time (Natalie's Song); Unforget You	Writer
Elliott Yamin	You Say; How Do I Know	Writer
Lisa Lois	Too Much Is Never Enough	Writer
Gene Thomas	Forever's Gonna Start Tonight	Writer
Renee Cassar	It's Not You (single)	Writer
Liz Callaway	Just Another Face	Writer
Emily Robins & Maddy Tyers	Not in Love	Writer
Cherine Nouri	Outcast; Unlove	Writer
The Dares	Love Me When I Leave	Writer
Lindsey Ray	Strange World	Writer
Rouge	Ready or Not	Writer
Brian Joo	Tears Run Dry	Writer
Alessandra	Lo Que Siempre Soñé	Writer
Stephanie J. Block	The Hardest Part of Love	Writer

2008

Brandy	Human; Gonna Find My Love	Writer
Lesley Roy	Crushed	Writer
Nádine	Made Up My Mind; Uncovered; I Will Be Strong	Writer
Stanfour	Lonely Life; I Will Be	Writer
Shannon Noll	You're Never Alone	Writer
Idina Menzel	Let Me Fall	Writer
Nikki Clan	Ya No Tengas Miedo	Writer
Jason Mraz, Van Hunt & Jon McLaughlin	Something To Believe In	Writer
The Afters	Falling into Place	Writer
eVonne Hsu	万众瞩目 (WAN ZHONG ZHU MU)	Writer
Cortés Alexander	Every Other Thought	Writer

2007

Backstreet Boys	Inconsolable (single); You Can Let Go; Everything But Mine; One in a Million; Any Other Way; In Pieces; Downpour; Close My Eyes; Nowhere to Go	Writer
Jordin Sparks	Next to You; Permanent Monday; Worth the Wait	Writer
JC Chasez	You Ruined Me (single)	Writer
Katharine McPhee	Ordinary World	Writer
No Angels	A Reason	Writer
Skye Sweetnam	Kiss a Girl	Writer
Dean Geyer	I Don't Wanna Wait	Writer
Younha	Delete	Writer
Natalie Gauci	Here I Am (single)	Writer
Constantine Maroulis	Fading into You	Writer
Niki Saletta	No Lolita	Writer
Kim Wayman	Sweet Spot	Writer
Lexy	Fly on Your Wall	Writer
Julianne Hough	Unraveling	Writer
Michael Duff	Overcome	Writer
Tess	Hold On (single)	Writer

2006

Ashley Parker Angel	Along the Way; Beautiful Lie	Writer
Nick Lachey	What's Left of Me (single); I Can't Hate You Anymore (single); Resolution (single); Run to Me; Outside Looking In	Writer
Taylor Hicks	Just to Feel That Way (single)	Writer
Michelle Culbertson & Brian Culbertson	Can't Remember the Rain	Writer
KILLERS	Bunny♀&Monkey♂	Writer
Eva Avila	Fallin' for You (single)	Writer
Rex Goudie	One Good Reason	Writer
Tata Young	Superhypnotic	Writer
Claire Lynch	Love Will Find You Again	Writer
Guy Sebastian	Unbreakable (single)	Writer
Kate Alexa	All I Hear (single); We All Fall Down; Under the Influence of You	Writer
Babado Novo	Pedindo Um Pouco Mais (Innegable)	Writer
Leandro Lopes	Deixo a voz me Levar (single)	Writer
Becki Ryan	Alive	Writer
NKD	What I Believe (single); What's That Noise; Unreal	Writer
Axiz	Welcome to My Sunny Day	Writer
Kristy Frank	Don't Even Think About It	Writer
Nikki Flores	Dream	Writer
SiEn Vanessa	Evenly Matched	Writer
Bianca	Ex Factor	Writer

2005

Backstreet Boys	Incomplete (single)	Writer
Brie Larson	She Said (single)	Writer, vocal arranger
Bo Bice	Hold On To Me	Writer
Shaggy feat. Nicole Scherzinger	Supa Hypnotic	Writer
Melissa O'Neil	Alive (single)	Writer
Kate DeAraugo	Maybe Tonight (single); The Most Beautiful Place	Writer
L5	Rendez-Moi La Vie	Writer
Chris Hajian	Kathy Griffin: My Life on the D-List theme song	Writer
Simon Webbe	Only Love; Sanctuary	Writer
Peter Ryan	Hold On To Me	Writer
Jon	Every Girl I've Wanted (single)	Writer
The Rhythm Slaves & D'Rox	Inside Your Eyes (single)	Writer
Anna Sahlene	Damn Good Try; Do Ya?	Writer
Niki Saletta	Sunny Day	Writer
Chenoa	Te Encontré	Writer
Dean Miller	Coming Back to You	Writer
Jesse McCartney	The Best Day of My Life	Writer

2004

Donny Osmond	Broken Man	Writer
Javine	Best of My Love (single)	Writer
Sita	Ce Qui Nous Rend Fous (single)	Writer
Casey Donovan	Shine	Writer
BoA	Feel Me	Writer
Tata Young	Cinderella (single)	Writer
Beverley Knight	Spin	Writer
soulDecision	Light It Up	Writer
Michelle McManus	Once in a Lifetime	Writer
Chrisie Santoni	It's All Inside	Writer
Deborah Tranelli	Gentle Souls and Tenderhearted Fools	Writer
Lisa Loeb	Try; Diamonds	Vocal arranger, vocal producer

2003

The Cheetah Girls	Cinderella (single)	Writer
Clay Aiken	Shine; I Will Carry You	Writer
Alcazar	Ménage à Trois (single)	Writer
Julie	Never Really Mine	Writer
S.H.E	Half Sugarism	Writer
Diadems	L'Amour À L'Amiable	Writer
Jang Na-ra	Oh! Happy Day	Writer
Nika	Quién Dijo Que Era El Fin (single)	Writer
Anna Sahlene	Disappear	Writer
Gareth Gates	All Cried Out; Just Say Yes	Writer
Dewi	Been There Done That	Writer
Hinda Hicks	Do What You Gotta Do	Writer
Ann Hampton Callaway	Manhattan in December	Writer
Linn S. Andersen	It's Alright with Me	Writer
Maureen McGovern	I'll Never Know	Writer
Sharon McNight	The Well Spoken Man	Writer

2002

Faith Hill	Back To You	Writer
Play	Cinderella (single); Never Neverland	Writer
Lisa Loeb	The Way It Really Is; Bring Me Up; Someone You Should Know	Writer, vocal arranger
Donna McKechnie	Astaire	Writer
Dana Glover	A Reason	Writer
Stephen Schwartz	The Roads Untaken	Writer
Ann Hampton Callaway	7th Street and Avenue A	Writer
Seiko	Everything I Am	Writer
Yasmeen	When Will It Be Me	Writer
Lisa Richard	I Break so Easily; Reach for the Moon	Writer
Tommi Mischell	To Give	Writer
Alan Williams & David Pomeranz	The Princess and the Pea	Background vocals

2001

Kristine Blond	All I Ever Wanted (single)	Writer, vocal arranger, vocal producer
Monica	Just Another Girl (single)	Writer
Anastacia	I Dreamed You	Writer
Blue	Sweet Thing	Writer
Sweet Female Attitude	Don't Tell Me (single)	Writer
L5	Ce Que Je Veux De Toi	Writer
2Be3	My Favourite Flavour	Writer
Brian Culbertson & Dave Koz	I Could Get Used to This	Writer
Michael Feinstein	A Place Called Home	Writer
LaTangela	Not While I'm Around	Writer
The Swingtown Lads	LUV S.C.U.D.	Writer

2000

A-1	No More (single)	Writer
3LW	I'm Gonna Make You Miss Me	Writer
Wilshire	Brave	Writer
i5	Cinderella; The Recipe	Writer
Bardot	Got Me Where You Want Me	Writer
CoCo Lee	Natural Reaction	Writer
Audra McDonald	Was That You?	Writer
Kieran Goss	Our Love Endures	Writer
Tanya Leah	The Love We Never Made	Writer
Jodie Brooke Wilson	Show Me Now	Writer
Jason Graae	Something That I Wanted You to Know	Writer

1999

Michael Feinstein & Maynard Ferguson	The Rhythm of the Blues	Writer
Ann-Margret	Get Bruce!	Writer
Joan Ryan	The Moon & the Stars	Writer

1998

Audra McDonald	The Allure of Silence	Writer
Lainie Kazan	Gone as a Man Can Get	Writer
Sasja Velt & Jan Hayston	Nie ohne dich (single)	Writer

1997

David Campbell	Gentle Souls and Tenderhearted Fools	Writer
Billy Stritch	Gently; I Don't Want to Be Away from You	Writer
Brian Lane Green	Never Really Mine to Lose; I'll Find a Way	Writer
Patrick DeGennaro	Why'd You Have to Do It so Good	Writer
The Gay 90s original cast	Desmond, Sam & Ellen; Well Spoken Woman	Writer
John Bucchino	Smile for Me Sometime; Paper and Pen	Writer, performer
The Tonics	More (Live at the Doolittle Theatre); Ridin' High (Live at the Luckman Theater)	Performer
Stephen Schwartz	Dreamscape; Crowded Island	Background vocals
Bill Graves	Why Do We Carry on This Way?	Background vocals

1995

Harvey Fierstein	This Is Not Going to Be Pretty; The Final Song	Writer
Billy Stritch	What Am I to Do	Writer
Andrea Marcovicci	Strangers Once Again	Writer
Happy Holidays musical by Martin Casella	Original music contributions	Writer
The Tonics	Any Place I Hang My Hat Is Home (Live at Wilshire Theatre)	Performer
Louis Nichole	Betty Botter	Background vocals

1994

Eric Michael Gillett	Flying in Your Dreams; Children of the Rainbow; Colors of the World	Writer
George & Ira Gershwin: A Musical Celebration	I Got Rhythm	Vocalist

1993

Ringling Bros. and Barnum & Bailey Circus	Various theme songs and original music	Writer
The Tonics	Good Thing Going (Live at Carnegie Hall)	Performer, arranger

1991

Wendy MaHarry	Fountain of Youth	Background vocals

1990

The Tonics	Original music for performances (1990-1997)	Writer
