= LMBO =

LMBO or LmbO may refer to:

- Leveraged Management Buy-out, a management buyout that is also a leveraged buyout
- Laughing My Bones Off, an Internet slang expression related to LOL
- The LMBO group, a French venture capital company that indirectly funded the European e-commerce website Pixmania
- LmbO, a protein involved in the biosynthesis of Lincomycin
- Legion Merchandising and Branding Officer, a kind of leader in the 501st Legion, an international Star Wars fan organization
- Little Memphis Blues Orchestra, a band previously known as the "Taylor Hicks Band"

== See also ==
- Limbo, a part of the afterlife in Catholic theology
- LMAO (Laughing My Ass Off), another Internet slang expression
