= Just to Feel That Way =

Single by Taylor Hicks

from the album Taylor Hicks
- Released: February 5, 2007
- Recorded: October–November 2006
- Studio: EMBLEM/Castle Oaks, Calabasas, California
- Length: 3:10
- Label: Arista
- Songwriter(s): Lindy Robbins, Jess Cates, Emanuel Kiriakou
- Producer(s): Matt Serletic

Taylor Hicks singles chronology
"Do I Make You Proud" (2006)	"Just to Feel That Way" (2007)	"Heaven Knows" (2007)

"Just to Feel That Way" is the first single from Taylor Hicks' major label debut album Taylor Hicks, released by Arista Records. It was written by Lindy Robbins, Jess Cates and Emanuel Kiriakou, and produced by Matt Serletic. It was officially released to radio on February 5, 2007, nearly two months after the album. Hicks said that fan reaction contributed to releasing it as a single instead of "The Runaround", as originally planned. The video starts with a black-and-white vision, then shows Hicks performing with the band.

== Critical reception ==
AllMusic's Stephen Thomas Erlewine put "Just to Feel That Way" alongside "Places I've Been" and "Wherever I Lay My Hat" as being "professional and pleasant" cuts from the record, calling it "plodding yet anthemic" with Hicks delivering "just enough personality". A writer for Billboard praised Hicks for delivering "a powerhouse vocal that goes from coarse growl to cool-guy sensitivity", and called the track "more convincing than most anything he sang on the show."

== Chart performance ==
On the week of February 24, 2007, "Just to Feel That Way" debuted at number 30 on the Billboard Adult Contemporary chart, and peaked at number 20 the week of April 7, staying on the chart for 18 weeks.

Chart (2007)	Peak position
US Adult Contemporary (Billboard)	20
