= I Can't Hate You Anymore =

2006 single by Nick Lachey

Single by Nick Lachey

from the album What's Left of Me
- Released: July 24, 2006
- Length: 3:54
- Label: Jive
- Songwriters: Nick Lachey; Rob Wells; Jess Cates; Lindy Robbins
- Producer: Rob Wells

Nick Lachey singles chronology
"What's Left of Me" (2006)	"I Can't Hate You Anymore" (2006)	"Resolution" (2006)

"I Can't Hate You Anymore" is a song by American singer-songwriter Nick Lachey, released as the second single from his second solo album, What's Left of Me, on July 24, 2006.

== Music video ==
The video for "I Can't Hate You Anymore" was filmed on June 27, 2006, on a beach in Malibu, California. This date was only a few days before Lachey's divorce from singer-actress Jessica Simpson became final, and coupled with the rainy atmosphere that appears in the video adds further poignancy to the melancholy lyrics of the song. The video premiered on MTV's Total Request Live on July 26, 2006, and debuted on the TRL Countdown Chart at number nine on July 27, 2006.

The music video utilizes a slightly different mixed track from the album version. Noticeable differences in this unnamed mix are the rising of the guitar and vocal echoes during the second verse. For example, the line "you're not the person that you used to be", "used to be" echoes in a following blended effect (not found on the original album release nor UK CD single). This version can only be found in the music video.

== Track listings ==
European CD single

1. "I Can't Hate You Anymore"
2. "Did I Ever Tell You"

Australian CD single

1. "I Can't Hate You Anymore" – 3:52
2. "Did I Ever Tell You" – 3:53
3. "Because I Told You So" – 3:45

== Charts ==
Chart (2006)	Peak position
Australia (ARIA)	34
Canada CHR/Top 40 (Billboard)	49
US Billboard Hot 100	87
US Adult Pop Airplay (Billboard)	33
US Pop Airplay (Billboard)	25

== Release history ==
Release dates and formats for "I Can't Hate You Anymore"
Region	Date	Format	Label(s)	Ref.
United States	July 24, 2006	Mainstream airplay	Jive; Zomba	
