= Heaven Knows (Taylor Hicks song) =

Single by Taylor Hicks

from the album Taylor Hicks
- Released: May 28, 2007
- Studio: EMBLEM/Castle Oaks, Calabasas, California
- Length: 3:38 (album version); 3:24 (radio edit)
- Label: Arista
- Songwriters: Cory Rooney; Makeba Riddick; Kara DioGuardi; Matt Serletic; Ray Charles; Pete Moore; Smokey Robinson; Bobby Rogers; Marvin Tarplin
- Producer: Matt Serletic

Taylor Hicks singles chronology
"Just to Feel That Way" (2007)	"Heaven Knows" (2007)	"What's Right Is Right" (2009)

"Heaven Knows" is the second single by Taylor Hicks from his self titled debut. It was announced as the second single by Clive Davis on the sixth season finale of American Idol, where Hicks subsequently performed the song. Arista hoped the song would revive sales of Hicks' album, after the underperformance of Hicks' first single "Just To Feel That Way". It hit the radio adds on May 28, 2007. By July 2008, it had sold about 11,000 copies. As of October 2007 the single had fared only slightly better than his first single, and had not increased sales of the album as hoped.

The song samples Ray Charles' "What'd I Say" and Marvin Gaye's "Ain't That Peculiar".

== Chart performance ==
Chart (2007)	Peak position
U.S. Billboard Adult Contemporary	19
