= What's Left of Me (song) =

2006 single by Nick Lachey

Single by Nick Lachey

from the album What's Left of Me
- Released: February 21, 2006
- Recorded: 2005
- Genre: Soft rock
- Length: 4:05
- Label: Jive; Zomba
- Songwriters: Nick Lachey; Jess Cates; Emanuel Kiriakou; Lindy Robbins
- Producer: Emanuel Kiriakou

Nick Lachey singles chronology
"This I Swear" (2003)	"What's Left of Me" (2006)	"I Can't Hate You Anymore" (2006)

"What's Left of Me" is a song co-written and recorded by American singer Nick Lachey. It was released on February 21, 2006, as the lead single from his second album, What's Left of Me. To date, it is Lachey's most successful single as a solo artist, reaching number 6 on the Billboard Hot 100 chart.

The song has also been recorded by Leandro Lopes, winner of the first season of Brazilian reality television show Ídolos, and was released as Lopes's first single.

== Composition ==
"What's Left of Me" is a pop rock ballad that lasts for 4 minutes and 5 seconds. The song's instrumentation includes string instruments and guitars. Lyrically, the song expresses the pain of Lachey's divorce from his first wife Jessica Simpson since they separated in the previous year in 2005 and later divorced in June.

== Track list ==
Digital download:

1. What's Left of Me (main version)

Europe CD single:

1. What's Left of Me (album version)
2. Don't Shut Me Out (bonus cut)
3. What's Left of Me (Passengerz remix)
4. What's Left of Me (Jack D. Elliott remix)

== Music video ==
Lachey was documented on a MTV special that was aired on April 22, 2006, called "What's Left of Me". Following the special, a Making The Video was aired, covering the production process. The clip itself was premiered to the world at the end of the show. The video features Vanessa Minnillo (whom he would later marry), a former Miss Teen USA, and former Total Request Live VJ, who in the video clip presumably plays Jessica Simpson.

As the video progresses, objects from a house begin to disappear, such as a laptop computer, a stereo, some pictures, furniture, and products inside the fridge. At the end of the video, the wedding ring that Minnillo is wearing on a necklace also disappears, and seconds later Minnillo disappears before Nick's eyes. A final shot of Lachey standing on an empty house projects the theme of the song, and shows that there's nothing 'left of him'.

Many references to Lachey's personal life with Simpson are made: most specifically the wedding ring on the necklace disappearing, and the presence of a camera crew filming Lachey and Minnillo (a reference to Lachey's personal discomfort over the making of the show Newlyweds: Nick and Jessica).

== Chart performance ==
"What's Left of Me" debuted at No. 89 on the US Billboard Hot 100 and eventually reached a peak position of No. 6 becoming Lachey's highest-charting song as a solo artist. "What's Left of Me" remained on the Billboard Hot 100 for a total of twenty-five weeks. The song also performed well on other Billboard charts, including the Billboard Pop 100 where it reached a peak position of number 5. Thanks to the success of the single the album had an extremely strong debut at No. 2 on the Billboard 200 for the week of May 14, 2006. What's Left of Me sold 172,000 copies for that week, which was already a significant improvement upon the first week sales of his debut album, SoulO, which only sold 171,000 in total.

=== Weekly charts ===
Chart (2006–07)	Peak Position
Australia (ARIA)	7
Austria (Ö3 Austria Top 40)	54
Belgium (Ultratip Bubbling Under Flanders)	4
Canada Digital Song Sales (Billboard)	8
Canada AC (Billboard)	3
Canada CHR/Pop Top 40 (Radio & Records)	8
Canada CHR/Top 40 (Billboard)	23
Canada Hot AC Top 40 (Radio & Records)	22
Canada Hot AC (Billboard)	24
Germany (GfK)	40
Ireland (IRMA)	47
Netherlands (Dutch Top 40 Tipparade)	18
Netherlands (Single Top 100)	88
New Zealand (Recorded Music NZ)	33
Scottish Singles Sales (Official Charts)	16
Slovakia Airplay (ČNS IFPI)	64
Sweden (Sverigetopplistan)	13
Switzerland (Schweizer Hitparade)	25
UK Singles (Official Charts)	47
US Billboard Hot 100	6
US Adult Contemporary (Billboard)	3
US Adult Pop Airplay (Billboard)	14
US Dance Airplay (Billboard)	1
US Pop Airplay (Billboard)	5

=== Year-end charts ===
Chart (2006)	Position
Australia (ARIA)	33
Sweden (Hitlistan)	87
US Billboard Hot 100	54
US Adult Contemporary (Billboard)	9
US Adult Top 40 (Billboard)	39
US Mainstream Top 40 (Billboard)	34

== Release history ==
Release dates and formats for "What's Left of Me"
Region	Date	Format	Label(s)	Ref.
United States	March 14, 2006	Mainstream airplay	Jive	

== Leandro Lopes version ==
"Deixo A Voz Me Levar"

Single by Leandro Lopes
- Released: October 6, 2006
- Genre: Pop
- Length: 3:09
- Label: Sony BMG
- Songwriters: Jess Cates, Milton Guedes, Emanuel Kiriakou, Nick Lachey, Lindy Robbins

=== Background ===
In the same year of "What's Left of Me"'s original release, Sony BMG's executives chose for Leandro Lopes and Lucas Poletto, the two finalists of the first season of Ídolos, to record the song which was called "Deixo A Voz Me Levar" (Portuguese for "Let The Voice Carry Me"), in preparation for a single release as soon as the winner was announced.

Leandro and Lucas sang the song on July 27, 2006. Upon Leandro winning the competition, "Deixo A Voz Me Levar" was released on October 6, 2006, as the first single from his first album entitled Leandro Lopes: Por Você (English: Leandro Lopes: For You).

=== Music video ===
Filming of Leandro Lopes' first music video started around September 2006 in São Paulo, São Paulo. The video was directed by Pietro Sargentelli and first premiered on October 13, 2006, on MTV Brasil.

=== Track listings ===
- CD single
1. "Deixo A Voz Me Levar" – 3:09
