= What's Left of Me (album) =

Studio album by Nick Lachey
- Released: May 9, 2006
- Recorded: October 2005–February 2006
- Studio: Various: Chalice Studios (Los Angeles); Westlake Recording Studios (Los Angeles); Bliss Recordings (Hollywood, CA); Glorified Mono Productions (Nashville); Glomo Studios (Nashville); Warner-Chappell Studios (Los Angeles); Little Nicky's Studio (Calabasas, CA); Murlyn Studios (Stockholm); Decibel Studios (Stockholm); Dark Horse Studios (Franklin, TN); Rocket Carousel Studio (Los Angeles)
- Genre: Pop rock
- Length: 44:30
- Label: Jive; Zomba
- Producer: Xandy Barry; Wally Gagel; Emanuel Kiriakou; Dan Muckala; Rob Wells; Anders Bagge; Andreas Carlsson; Peer Åström

Nick Lachey chronology
SoulO (2003)	What's Left of Me (2006)	A Father's Lullaby (2013)

Singles from What's Left of Me
- 1. "What's Left of Me" Released: February 21, 2006; 2. "I Can't Hate You Anymore" Released: July 24, 2006; 3. "Resolution" Released: December 12, 2006

Professional ratings
Review scores
Source	Rating
AllMusic	3/5 stars

What's Left of Me is the second solo album by American singer-songwriter Nick Lachey, released on May 9, 2006, by Jive Records and Zomba. The album includes the hit ballad "What's Left of Me", which to date is Lachey's most successful single as a solo artist. Other singles included are titled "I Can't Hate You Anymore" and "Resolution". On June 14, 2006, What's Left of Me was certified Gold by the Recording Industry Association of America for shipments of over 500,000 copies, making it the first Lachey solo album to be certified by the RIAA. Lachey embarked on the What's Left of Me Tour in support of the album.

== Track listing ==
No.	Title	Writer(s)	Producer(s)	Length
1.	"What's Left of Me"	Nick Lachey; Jess Cates; Emanuel Kiriakou; Lindy Robbins	Emanuel Kiriakou	4:06
2.	"I Can't Hate You Anymore"	Lachey; Cates; Robbins; Rob Wells	Rob Wells	3:54
3.	"On Your Own"	Xandy Barry; Wally Gagel; Luke McMaster	Wally Gagel; Xandy Barry	3:06
4.	"Outside Looking In"	Dan Muckala; Robbins; Cates; Lachey	Dan Muckala	3:20
5.	"Shades of Blue"	Muckala; Liz Vidal	Muckala	4:18
6.	"Beautiful"	Andreas Carlsson; Anders Bagge; Lachey; Peer Åström	Anders Bagge; Peer Åström; Andreas Carlsson	3:34
7.	"Everywhere But Here"	Wells; Greg Johnston; David Martin	Wells	3:29
8.	"I Do It for You"	Carlsson; Bagge; Lachey; Åström	Bagge; Åström; Carlsson	3:23
9.	"Run to Me"	Muckala; Robbins; Cates; Lachey	Muckala	3:32
10.	"Ghosts"	Jamie Cullum; Kara DioGuardi; Greg Wells	Greg Wells; Kara DioGuardi	4:10
11.	"You're Not Alone"	Carlsson; Bagge; Lachey; Åström	Bagge; Åström; Carlsson	3:43
12.	"Resolution"	Lachey; R. Wells; Robbins; Cates	R. Wells	3:55

=== Additional tracks ===
1. "Did I Ever Tell You" (Nick Lachey, Adam Anders, Pamela Sheyne) (US Target stores bonus track) – 3:53
2. "Alone" (UK and Japanese bonus track) – 3:28
3. "Because I Told You So" (Jonatha Brooke) (Japanese bonus track) – 3:45
4. "Don't Shut Me Out" (Nick Lachey, Adam Anders, Pamela Sheyne) (What's Left of Me single B-side) – 3:37

== Personnel ==
Credits adapted from the album's liner notes.

Vocals

- Emanuel Kiriakou – background vocals (1)
- Xandy Barry – background vocals (3)
- Dan Muckala – background vocals (4)
- Luke Brown – background vocals (5, 9)
- Nick Lachey – background vocals (1, 5, 9)

Instrumentation

- Emanuel Kiriakou – bass, acoustic guitar, electric guitar, piano, keyboards (1)
- Greg Johnston – bass, electric guitar (2, 4)
- Sebastian Nylund – bass (6, 8), guitar (6, 8, 11)
- Greg Wells – bass, drums (9)
- Adam Lester – guitar (4, 9)
- Corky James – guitar (8, 11)
- David Martin – acoustic guitar (7)
- Chuck Butler – acoustic guitar, electric guitar (4, 5, 9)
- Jess Cates – piano (1)
- Peter Ljung – piano (6)
- Jamie Cullum – piano (10)
- Rob Wells – piano (2, 7, 12)
- Dan Muckala – piano, keyboards (4, 5, 9)
- Dan Needham – drums (4, 5, 9)
- Joey Waronker – drums, percussion (3)
- Jimi Englund – percussion (1)

Technical

- Chris Lord-Alge – mixing
- Dim'e Krnjaic – assistant mix engineer
- Keith Armstrong – assistant mix engineer
- Tom Coyne – mastering

Artwork

- Olaf Heine – photography
- Jackie Murphy – art direction, design
- Sean Kinney – art direction, design
- Samantha McMillen – stylist
- Diana Schmidtke – groomer

== Charts ==
=== Weekly charts ===
Weekly chart performance for What's Left of Me
Chart (2006)	Peak position
Australian Albums (ARIA)	13
Irish Albums (IRMA)	21
German Albums (Offizielle Top 100)	93
Swiss Albums (Schweizer Hitparade)	57
UK Albums (OCC)	91
US Billboard 200	2

=== Year-end charts ===
Year-end chart performance for What's Left of Me in 2006
Chart (2006)	Position
US Billboard 200	107

== Certifications ==
Region	Certification	Certified units/sales
United States (RIAA)	Gold	500,000^{^}
^{^} Shipments figures based on certification alone.
