= What's Right Is Right =

Single by Taylor Hicks

from the album The Distance
- Released: January 27, 2009
- Recorded: November/December 2008
- Genre: Blue-eyed soul
- Length: 3:48 (single version)
- Label: Modern Whomp Records
- Songwriter: Simon Climie/Dennis Morgan
- Producer: Simon Climie

Taylor Hicks singles chronology
"Heaven Knows" (2007)	"What's Right Is Right" (2009)	"Seven Mile Breakdown" (2009)

"What's Right Is Right" is the first single from Taylor Hicks' second studio album The Distance.

== Single release ==
The single was released to Adult Contemporary radio adds and digital outlets on January 27, 2009. A music video for the song was filmed on January 12, 2009 in Chicago by director Jake Davis. "What's Right Is Right" represents the start of a musical comeback for Hicks, who has not released new music since his major label debut album Taylor Hicks in December 2006. It is the first single to be released by Hicks on an independent label; his first three were released and promoted by Arista Records. It has peaked at number 24 on the Hot Adult Contemporary Tracks on billboard.

== Chart performance ==
Chart (2009)	Peak position
U.S. Billboard Hot Adult Contemporary Tracks	24
