= Taylor Hicks (album) =

Studio album by Taylor Hicks
- Released: December 12, 2006
- Recorded: October–November 2006
- Studios: EMBLEM/Castle Oaks (Calabasas, California)
- Genres: Pop, blues rock
- Length: 41:14
- Label: Arista
- Producer: Matt Serletic

Taylor Hicks chronology
Under the Radar (2005)	Taylor Hicks (2006)	Early Works (2008)

Singles from Taylor Hicks
- 1. "Just to Feel That Way" Released: February 5, 2007; 2. "Heaven Knows" Released: May 28, 2007

Taylor Hicks is the major label debut album by the American Idol fifth-season winner of the same name. The album was released on December 12, 2006, in the United States by Arista Records in association with 19 Recordings Limited, nearly seven months after Hicks won the reality-talent competition in May. Hicks coined the phrase "modern whomp" to describe the album's sound—an amalgam of soul, blues, funk, and Cajun influences with a contemporary twist. The first single from the album was the ballad "Just to Feel That Way".

The album debuted at the number two spot on the U.S. Billboard 200 chart, selling 298,000 copies in its first week. Within one month of its release, Taylor Hicks was certified platinum by the Recording Industry Association of America for shipping over one million copies. However, over a year later it had reached sales of only about 700,000 copies, making it the second lowest selling debut album by an American Idol winner, after Kris Allen and Lee DeWyze's debuts. The album has sold 704,000 copies as of December 2010.

== Album background ==
Recording for the album took six weeks, between October and November 2006, right after the culmination of the American Idols LIVE! Tour. The album, Hicks's first full-length endeavor, includes contributions from Bryan Adams, Diane Warren, and Rob Thomas, as well as a few of Hicks's originals which have appeared on his previous self-produced effort Under the Radar. Producer Matt Serletic had only heard about Taylor Hicks for the first time when he was approached for the Idol winner's project.

Collaborations with other artists such as Robert Randolph and John Mayer were mentioned by Hicks in interviews, but failed to materialize due to scheduling problems and the goal to release the album before Christmas. Hicks had also been invited by the estate of Ray Charles to record at Charles's own historic 2107 West Washington Boulevard Studio (a.k.a. 2107-RPM) in Los Angeles, but those plans also had to be postponed until a future album. Hicks would have been the first person to record in the studio since Charles himself.

Fan blog Gray Charles, under contract with Hicks and his record company, gradually released first-hand details of the album, with Hicks providing weekly updates via audio blog. "The Runaround" was the first track premiered on Gray Charles on November 21, followed by "Dream Myself Awake" and "The Right Place", even before they were made available on Hicks's official website and MySpace page. The full album was made available for preview on the VH1 website on December 5.

"The Runaround" was originally intended to be the first single released from the album, and Hicks performed the song on The Tonight Show with Jay Leno and The Martha Stewart Show in the run-up to the album's release. Instead, "Just to Feel That Way" was announced as the first "official" single after nearly two months. Hicks admitted that fan reaction to the album contributed to the decision. His second single release was "Heaven Knows" The album's singles, "Just to Feel That Way" and "Heaven Knows" peaked at #20 and #19 respectively on Billboard's Hot Adult Contemporary Tracks chart.

== Critical reception ==
Professional ratings
Review scores
Source	Rating
AllMusic	4/5 stars
Billboard	mixed
Entertainment Weekly	C
Los Angeles Times	2.5/4 stars
PopMatters	6/10
USA Today	2.5/4 stars

Taylor Hicks garnered mixed reviews from critics. AllMusic's Stephen Thomas Erlewine gave high praise to the record's balancing of modern adult contemporary pop and throwback retro soul throughout the track listing, Matt Serletic for capturing the "lived-in warmth" of Hicks' performances, and Hicks for selling both genres with "enough personality", highlighting the soulful tracks made by the studio pros ("The Right Place", "The Runaround") and Hicks himself ("Soul Thing", "The Deal"), concluding that "he's created an album that fits all of American Idol's requirements -- it's big, clean, catchy and commercial -- without losing his own identity, so he's sneaked blue-eyed soul back into the mainstream. But he never would have gotten this chance if American Idol's huge audience didn't recognize that he had this talent and if they didn't realize that he was making music that they had forgotten to hear, and fortunately, 19 Entertainment, in turn, realized this and let Taylor Hicks make an album that will surely satisfy anybody who loved to hear him on the show, and an album that stands as one of the best Idol-related records yet made." Mike Joseph of PopMatters praised Serletic for translating Hicks' "good-natured and earnest" Idol personality onto record and Hicks for elevating even the weaker songs by adding enough "emotional investment" to his performance without any histrionics, concluding that: "While the hipster-types will hate on sight, Taylor Hicks is a solid album of meat-and-potatoes music. With a smart blend of rock & soul not seen since the days when Hall & Oates ruled MTV, the grey haired dude with the spastic dance moves has actually made one of the better albums to sprout from the American Idol machine." Ann Powers of the Los Angeles Times felt that the "speedily produced" debut was filled with "store-bought stuff" that didn't display Hicks' musical stylings like his own originals, concluding that: "Maroon 5 is doing blue-eyed soul better right now, but Hicks, who's not as artistically mature as his back story suggests, could get there. He just needs some more real blues." Entertainment Weekly writer Henry Goldblatt felt the album was hampered by Hicks' "limited vocal range" being centered and taking away any joy and energy the tracks had. Elysa Gardner of USA Today wrote that: "The mostly generic tunes provided by a predictable posse of studio vets include a few surprisingly savvy showcases for Hicks' gray-haired soul shtick. Alas, a pair of hokey originals should dispel any notions of the crooner as a budding troubadour."

== Track listing ==
Taylor Hicks track listing
No.	Title	Writer(s)	Length
1.	"The Runaround"	Loren Gold; James Renald	3:13
2.	"Dream Myself Awake"	Rob Thomas	3:38
3.	"Heaven Knows"	Cory Rooney; Makeba Riddick; Kara DioGuardi; Matt Serletic; Ray Charles; Warren Moore; Smokey Robinson; Robert Roberts; Marvin Tarplin	3:35
4.	"Gonna Move" (Paul Pena cover)	Paul Pena	4:22
5.	"Wherever I Lay My Hat (That's My Home)" (Marvin Gaye cover)	Marvin Gaye; Barrett Strong; Norman Whitfield	3:32
6.	"Give Me Tonight"	Taylor Hicks; Kevin Kadish; Brandon Jane; Leah Crutchfield; DioGuardi; Serletic	3:34
7.	"Just to Feel That Way"	Lindy Robbins; Jess Cates; Emanuel Kiriakou	3:11
8.	"The Maze"	Scott Cutler; Anne Preven	2:47
9.	"Places I've Been"	Diane Warren	3:29
10.	"Soul Thing"	Hicks	3:20
11.	"The Deal"	Hicks	3:17
12.	"The Right Place"	Bryan Adams; Jim Vallance	3:16

Available exclusively on selected CDs at Wal-Mart.
No.	Title	Writer(s)	Length
17.	"Hell of a Day"	Hicks	3:40

Notes

- "Soul Thing", "The Deal" and "Hell of a Day" are reworkings of the original version from Hicks's previous album Under the Radar (2005); the latter also contains an additional verse.

Sample credits

- "Heaven Knows" contains samples from "What'd I Say" by Ray Charles and "Ain't That Peculiar" by Marvin Gaye.

== Personnel ==
Credits adapted from the album's liner notes.

Vocals

- Kara DioGuardi – background vocals (6)
- Nikisha Grier – background vocals (3, 6)
- Taylor Hicks – lead vocals (all tracks), background vocals (4)
- Judith Hill – background vocals (3, 6)
- Tom Leonard – background vocals (6, 8, 9)
- Jason Morales – background vocals (3, 6)
- Josef Powell – background vocals (1, 12)
- Louis Price – background vocals 1, 12)
- Matt Serletic – background vocals (3)
- Matt Tryggestad – background vocals (2, 7)
- Oren Waters – background vocals (1, 12)
- Terry Young – background vocals (1, 12)

Instrumentation

- Leland Sklar – bass (5, 8–12)
- Paul Bushnell – bass (2, 6, 7)
- Reggie Hamilton – upright bass (1, 3), electric bass (1), bass (4)
- Chris Bruce – bass, guitar (6)
- James Harrah – guitar (all tracks)
- Rusty Anderson – guitar (3, 8, 9)
- Greg Leisz – lap steel solo (10), pedal steel (9, 10)
- Stevie Blacke – cello, lap steel (4), strings (7, 9)
- Jamie Muhoberac – clavinet (10), organ (1, 3, 4, 5, 8, 10–12), piano (1, 2, 5, 8, 9, 11, 12)
- Matt Serletic – keyboards (5, 7, 8, 12), piano (10), percussion (11), Wurlitzer (6)
- Patrick Warren – keyboards (2, 3, 7–9)
- Kevin Kadish – organ (6)
- Greg Adams – trumpet (1–4)
- Lee Thornburg – trumpet (1–4)
- Eric Marienthal – tenor saxophone (1–4)
- Johnnie Bamont – tenor saxophone, baritone saxophone (1, 2, 4)
- Nicholas Lane – trombone (1–4)
- Taylor Hicks – harmonica (4, 5), marching drums (1)
- Lenny Castro – percussion (1, 2, 4, 5, 7, 10, 12)
- Alex Richbourgh – programming (1–6, 8, 10, 12)
- Pete Davis – programming (5, 7, 9)
- John O'Brien – programming (2)
- Curt Bisquera – drums (all tracks)
- The Weekend Warrior's Drum Corps – marching drums (1)

Technical

- Serban Ghenea – mixing (1–3, 6, 8)
- David Thoener – mixing (4, 5, 7, 9–12)
- Greg Collins – additional engineering
- Jess Sutcliffe – additional engineering
- Patrick Woodward – additional engineering
- Erik Reichers – assistant engineer (4, 5, 7, 9–12)
- Kevin Mahoney – assistant mix engineer (1–3, 6, 8)
- Tim Roberts – assistant mix engineer (1–3, 6, 8)
- Brent Paschke – digital editing
- Stephen Marcussen – mastering

Imagery

- Jane Morledge – creative direction and design
- Charlie Becker – additional design
- Chris LeBeau – art production
- Jim Wright – photography
- Chris Ehrlich – styling
- Rhea Willis – grooming

== Charts ==
=== Weekly charts ===
Weekly chart performance for Taylor Hicks
Chart (2006)	Peak position
US Billboard 200	2

=== Year-end charts ===
Year-end chart performance for Taylor Hicks in 2007
Chart (2007)	Position
US Billboard 200	74

== Certifications ==
Region	Certification	Certified units/sales
United States (RIAA)	Platinum	1,000,000^{^}
^{^} Shipments figures based on certification alone.
