= Room Raiders =

Television program

- Genre: Reality competition Dating show
- Country of origin: United States
- Original language: English
- No. of seasons: 8

Production
- Running time: 30 minutes

Original release
- Network: MTV
- Release: October 13, 2003 – May 13, 2009

Room Raiders is a dating/reality series that aired on MTV.

== Premise ==
On the show, three men or women have their rooms inspected, or "raided" by another single man or woman. The raider does not meet or see any of the three singles (any personal photographs of the contestant are removed from the room or covered with a smiley face sticker). At the end of the episode, the raider chooses to go on a date with one of them based on the contents of their rooms. The three contestants watch and comment, while sitting in a van, as their rooms are inspected. After the raider has finished with each of the rooms, the three contestants then raid the raider's room. Finally, the raider confronts the three contestants and makes his or her choice.

== Seasons ==
=== Room Raiders ===
The first episode was filmed at Tulane University, and featured Jessica Simpson and Nick Lachey to promote the program. It was branded as "Dorm Raiders", although the rest of the season used the branding "Room Raiders."

== International versions ==
- (Lithuania) A Lithuanian version debuted in 2010 on LNK.
