= Peace in Our Time =

Peace in Our Time, a phrase taken from the Book of Common Prayer, may refer to:

- "Peace for our time", a phrase spoken by British Prime Minister Neville Chamberlain regarding the Munich Agreement of 1938, frequently misquoted as "Peace in our time"

== Film, television, and theatre ==
- Peace in Our Time (film) or The Silent Battle, a 1939 British film
- Peace in Our Time (play), a 1946 play by Noël Coward
- "Peace in Our Time", an episode of Please Sir!
- True Stories: Peace in Our Time?, a 1988 British television film featuring John Cleese as Neville Chamberlain

== Music ==
=== Albums ===
- Peace in Our Time (Big Country album) or the title song (see below), 1988
- Peace in Our Time (Good Riddance album), 2015

=== Songs ===
- "Peace in Our Time" (Big Country song), 1989
- "Peace in Our Time" (Jennifer Holliday song), 1988; notably covered by Eddie Money (1989) and Cliff Richard (1993)
- "Peace in Our Time", by 10cc from Mirror Mirror, 1995
- "Peace in Our Time", by Carter the Unstoppable Sex Machine from Peace Together, 1993
- "Peace in Our Time", by Elvis Costello from Goodbye Cruel World, 1984
- "Peace in Our Time", by Gorky Park from Gorky Park, 1989
- "Peace in Our Time", by Ray Davies from Working Man's Café, 2007
- "Peace in Our Time", by Globus from Cinematica, 2022
- "Da pacem Domine", a Latin hymn whose traditional English translation includes the phrase "Give peace in our time, O Lord"

== Other uses ==
- Peace in Our Time, a 1923 novel by Oliver Onions
- Peace in Our Time?, a 1985 non-fiction book by David Atkinson
- Peace in Our Time?, a 1991 non-fiction book by June Goodfield and Mary Fitzgerald
- Peace in Our Time, an expansion set to the wargame Europa

== See also ==
- In Our Time (disambiguation)
