= Early Works (Taylor Hicks album) =

Compilation album by Taylor Hicks
- Released: August 12, 2008
- Genre: Blue-eyed soul, blues, blues rock
- Label: Modern Whomp Records

Taylor Hicks chronology
Taylor Hicks (2006)	Early Works (2008)	The Distance (2009)

Professional ratings
Review scores
Source	Rating
Allmusic	3.5/5 stars

Early Works is a compilation album by the American Idol fifth-season winner Taylor Hicks. The album was released on August 12, 2008 in the United States by Modern Whomp Records. The album was available exclusively at Target Stores until November 24, 2008, when it was released to iTunes and other various online retailers. Early Works includes songs from In Your Time and Under the Radar, Hicks two pre-Idol CDs.

== Track listing ==
1. "Soul Thing" (Hicks)
2. "The Fall" (Hicks)
3. "Hold on to Your Love" (Hicks)
4. "The Deal" (Hicks)
5. "Heart and Soul" (Hicks)
6. "In Your Time" (Hicks)
7. "West Texas Sky" (Hicks)
8. "Somehow" (Hicks)
9. "Tighten Up" (Archie Bell)
10. "Son of a Carpenter" (Hicks)
11. "My Friend" (Hicks)
12. "Georgia" with Billy Earl McClelland (Stuart Gorrell, Hoagy Carmichael)
