= Newlyweds: Nick and Jessica =

- Starring: Nick Lachey; Jessica Simpson
- Opening theme: "This I Swear" by Nick Lachey
- Country of origin: United States
- Original language: English
- No. of seasons: 3
- No. of episodes: 40

Production
- Executive producers: Greg Johnston; Lois Curren; Rod Aissa
- Running time: 23 minutes

Original release
- Network: MTV
- Release: August 19, 2003 – March 30, 2005

Newlyweds: Nick and Jessica is an American reality television series that aired on MTV. It followed the marriage of then husband and wife Nick Lachey and Jessica Simpson. It premiered on August 19, 2003 and ended on March 30, 2005, with a total of 40 episodes over the course of 3 seasons.

== Background ==
Jessica Simpson's infamous "Chicken or fish?" moment in the first episode of Newlyweds.

Part of the show's gimmick involved displaying Simpson's naive personality, playing on the popular stereotype of "dumb blondes". Perhaps the most famous example comes from the first episode, in which Simpson, confronted with a can of Chicken of the Sea tuna, asked Nick "Is this chicken, what I have, or is this fish? I know it's tuna, but it says 'Chicken... by the Sea' [sic]."

Over the span of the first season, Simpson's popularity began growing, as many of her "dumb blonde" antics gave her much publicity. By the close of 2003, Simpson and Lachey had both become household names.

Simpson and Lachey were married on October 26, 2002, and filed for divorce on December 16, 2005. On June 30, 2006, Jessica and Nick's divorce was finalized.

== Episodes ==
=== Series overview ===
Season	Episodes	Originally released	
Season	Episodes	First released	Last released
1	10	August 19, 2003	October 14, 2003
2	20	January 21, 2004	August 18, 2004
3	10	January 26, 2005	March 30, 2005

=== Season 1 (2003) ===
No. overall	No. in season	Title	Original release date
1	1	"Chicken of the Sea"	August 19, 2003
2	2	"The Dancers"	August 26, 2003
3	3	"Newlyweds Go Camping"	September 2, 2003
4	4	"Newlyweds Go Golfing"	September 9, 2003
5	5	"The Platypus"	September 16, 2003
6	6	"Buffalo Wings"	September 23, 2003
7	7	"Newlyweds Decorate"	September 30, 2003
8	8	"The Video Shoot"	October 7, 2003
9	9	"Jessica's Birthday"	October 14, 2003
10	10	"Jessica Cooks Dinner"	October 14, 2003

=== Season 2 (2004) ===
No. overall	No. in season	Title	Original release date
11	1	"The Anniversary"	January 21, 2004
12	2	"Nick's 30th B-Day"	January 28, 2004
13	3	"The Newlyweds Shop"	February 4, 2004
14	4	"The French Language"	February 11, 2004
15	5	"The Duet"	February 18, 2004
16	6	"A Newlyweds Christmas"	February 25, 2004
17	7	"Jessica's 'Dessert'"	March 3, 2004
18	8	"Puppy Madness"	March 10, 2004
19	9	"The Newlyweds Vacation"	March 17, 2004
20	10	"Valentine's Day"	March 24, 2004
21	11	"CaCee Moves In"	June 16, 2004
22	12	"Mismatched Threesome"	June 23, 2004
23	13	"Celebrity Issues"	June 30, 2004
24	14	"Eye Surgery"	July 7, 2004
25	15	"Newlyweds Baby"	July 14, 2004
26	16	"The Kentucky Derby"	July 21, 2004
27	17	"Nick and Joe"	July 28, 2004
28	18	"The Traveling Newlyweds"	August 4, 2004
29	19	"Nick's Lawn"	August 11, 2004
30	20	"The Newlyweds"	August 18, 2004

=== Season 3 (2005) ===
No. overall	No. in season	Title	Original release date
31	1	"Newlyweds Two Year Anniversary"	January 26, 2005
32	2	"Jess Gets a Root Canal"	February 2, 2005
33	3	"Training Daisy"	February 9, 2005
34	4	"The Dukes of Hazzard"	February 16, 2005
35	5	"New Year's Eve"	February 23, 2005
36	6	"The Orange Bowl"	March 2, 2005
37	7	"Boys Weekend in Cabo"	March 9, 2005
38	8	"Newlyweds Together Again"	March 16, 2005
39	9	"The Valentine's Day Budget"	March 23, 2005
40	10	"Newlyweds Series Finale"	March 30, 2005
