= Leandro Lopes =

Brazilian singer-songwriter (born 1984)

- Born: Leandro Lopes Luis; January 24, 1984 (age 42); Rio de Janeiro
- Genres: Pop, axé
- Occupations: Singer, songwriter
- Instruments: Vocals, guitar
- Years active: 2006–present
- Labels: Sony BMG (2006–2007); Universal Music Group (2008–present)

Leandro Lopes Luiz (born January 24, 1984), best known as Leandro Lopes, is a Brazilian pop rock and axé music singer and songwriter.

He rose to fame after winning the first season of the reality television show Ídolos Brazil. He also received the nickname "Pica-Pau" (Woody Woodpecker, 1940s cartoon series) because of his red-dyed hair at one point in his career.

== Biography ==
Leandro Lopes was born on January 24, 1984 in Santíssimo neighborhood of Rio de Janeiro, Brazil. Adopted at age 15, he played drums in a pop rock band. At 16, he segued to a frontman role and joined a pop rock and heavy metal band. He then began performing at night, partying with his best friend of 13 years.

His repertoire includes the musical inspiration from artists such as Zé Ramalho and Bruce Dickinson from Iron Maiden.

== Ídolos Brazil ==
=== Overview ===
Lopes auditioned for the first season of Ídolos Brazil on Rio de Janeiro, Rio de Janeiro.

=== Performances ===
Week #	Theme	Song Choice	Original Artist	Order #	Result
Audition	Auditioner's Choice	"Tempos Modernos"	Lulu Santos	N/A	Advanced
Theater	First Solo	"A Sombra Da Maldade"	Cidade Negra	N/A	Advanced
Top 30	Semi-final/Group 3	"Noite Do Prazer"	Cláudio Zoli	10	Advanced
Top 10	My Idol	"Paraíso"	Cláudio Zoli	6	Safe
Top 9	Male Singers	"Último Romântico"	Lulu Santos	8	Safe
Top 8	Female Singers	"Lanterna dos Afogados"	Cássia Eller	1	Safe
Top 7	Birth Year Songs	"Frisson"	Tunai	4	Safe
Top 6	Jovem Pan Hits	"Do Seu Lado"	Jota Quest	6	Safe
Top 5	Jovem Guarda	"O Bom"	Eduardo Araújo	3	Safe
Top 5	Jovem Guarda	"Vem Me Ajudar"	The Fevers	8	Safe
Top 4	Brazil Regional	"Eva"	Rádio Táxi	3	Safe
Top 4	Brazil Regional	"Admirável Gado Novo"	Zé Ramalho	7	Safe
Top 3	Contestant's Choice	"As Sete Vampiras"	Léo Jaime	2	Safe
Top 3	Contestant's Choice	"Eu Me Rendo"	Fábio Júnior	5	Safe
Top 2	Winner's Single	"Deixo A Voz Me Levar"	Leandro Lopes	2	Winner
Top 2	Challenging Songs	"Queixa"	Caetano Veloso	4	Winner
Top 2	Judge's Choice	"Quero Te Encontrar"	Kid Abelha	6	Winner
Top 2	Best of the Season	"Paraíso"	Cláudio Zoli	8	Winner
Top 2	Celebrity Duet	"Admirável Gado Novo" with Zé Ramalho	Zé Ramalho	10	Winner

== Career ==
Lopes signed a recording contract with Sony BMG, managed by SBT in July 2006, as part of his Ídolos Brazil prize package.

=== Por Você ===
Studio recording sessions for the eponymous major label debut Leandro Lopes ran in São Paulo, São Paulo, started in August 2006 and finished in September in the same year.

Leandro Lopes: Por Você was released on October 6, 2006, in Brazil, with the song "Deixo A Voz Me Levar" (English: Let The Voice Carry Me) as first single.

==== First Single Music Video ====
Filming of Leandro Lopes' first music video started around September 2006 in São Paulo, São Paulo. The video was directed by Pietro Sargentelli and first premiered on October 13, 2006, on MTV Brasil.

=== Rapazolla ===
During Carnival 2008, Leandro joined the axé music band Rapazolla as a vocalist, where he remains until today.

=== Discography ===
==== Studio albums ====
Year	Album details	Certifications (sales threshold)
2006	Ídolos Brazil – First Season: Released: 2006; Label: Sony BMG; Format: CD	BRA: N/A
2006	Leandro Lopes: Por Você: Released: 2006; Label: Sony BMG; Format: CD	BRA: 50.000
2008	Rapazolla: Ao Vivo Em Salvador: Released: 2008; Label: Universal Music; Format: CD	BRA: N/A

==== Singles ====
Year	Single	Album
2006	"Deixo A Voz Me Levar"	Leandro Lopes: Por Você
2006	"Será?"	Leandro Lopes: Por Você
2007	"Nosso Amor É Assim"	Leandro Lopes: Por Você
2007	"Por Você"	Leandro Lopes: Por Você
2008	"De Bem Com a Vida"	Rapazolla: Ao Vivo Em Salvador

Preceded by None	Ídolos Brazil winner 2006	Succeeded by Thaeme Mariôto
