= Ídolos Brazil season 1 =

Ídolos Brazil
- Season 1
- Hosted by: Beto Marden; Lígia Mendes
- Judges: Carlos Eduardo Miranda; Arnaldo Saccomani; Cyz Zamorano; Thomas Roth
- Winner: Leandro Lopes
- Runner-up: Lucas Poletto
- Finals venue: Anhanguera TV Center

Release
- Original network: SBT
- Original release: April 5 – July 27, 2006

Season chronology
- Next → Season 2

Ídolos Brazil 1 (known as Ídolos 2006) was the first season of Brazilian reality interactive talent show Ídolos (and first aired on SBT), which premiered April 5, 2006 with the season finale airing on July 27, 2006.

Beto Marden and Lígia Mendes were the hosts and the judging panel consisted of Carlos Eduardo Miranda, Arnaldo Saccomani, Cyz Zamorano and Thomas Roth.

Leandro Lopes won the competition with Lucas Poletto as the first runner-up and Osnir Alves finishing third.

== Early Process ==
=== Regional Auditions ===
Auditions were held in the following cities:

Episode Air Date	Audition City	Audition Date	Audition Venue
April 6, 2006	Recife	Nov 25, 2005	Sport Club Recife
April 12, 2006	Rio de Janeiro	Jan 13, 2006	Ribalta Events
April 13, 2006	Brasília	Dec 08, 2005	Porto Vittória Events
April 19, 2006	São Paulo	Jan 20, 2006	Anhembi Arena
April 20, 2006	Porto Alegre	Dec 15, 2005	Hotel De Ville

== Theater Round ==
=== Chorus Line ===
The first day of Theater Week featured the one hundred fifteen contestants from the auditions round. Divided into groups, each contestant should go on stage and sing a song a capella for the judges until they stopped them. Seventy-five contestants advanced.

=== Groups ===
The seventy-five remaining contestants were divided in groups of four or three. They had to pick a song and sing. The contestants were divided into three rooms. All the contestants in room 2 were eliminated, while contestants in rooms 1 and 3 advanced.

=== Solos ===
Forty-five made it to the final round, which required the contestants singing solo. In the end, the judges take the contestants in groups of five and tell them if they made the final thirty.

== Semi-finals ==
The thirty semifinalists were randomly split into different groups. Each contestant would then sing in their respective group's night. There were three separate groups and the top three contestants from each group made it to the finals.

=== Wild Card ===
Eight contestants who failed to make it to the finals were invited back to perform for another chance at a spot in the finals. Only one wildcard contestant (Davison Batista) was chosen by the public vote.

== Finals ==
=== Finalists ===
Contestant	Age	Hometown	Audition Location	Voted Off
Leandro Lopes	22	Rio de Janeiro	Rio de Janeiro	Winner
Lucas Poletto	20	Medianeira	Porto Alegre	Jul 27, 2006
Osnir Alves	24	Araguaína	Brasília	Jul 20, 2006
Vanessa Oliveira	24	Guaratinguetá	São Paulo	Jul 13, 2006
Paulo Neto	24	Timbaúba	Recife	Jul 6, 2006
Angel Duarte	29	Brasília	Brasília	Jun 29, 2006
Giovana Félix	19	São Paulo	São Paulo	Jun 22, 2006
Davison Batista	27	Lorena	São Paulo	Jun 15, 2006
Thaís Moreira	24	Brasília	Brasília	Jun 08, 2006
Pollyana Papel	18	Bebedouro	São Paulo	Jun 01, 2006

== Elimination chart ==
Legend
Did Not Perform	Female	Male	Top 30	Top 10	Winner

Safe	Safe First	Safe Last	Eliminated

Stage:		Semi-Finals			WC	Finals								
Stage:		Top 30			WC	Top 10	Top 9	Top 8	Top 7	Top 6	Top 5	Top 4	Top 3	Top 2
Week:		5/4	5/11	5/18	5/25	6/1	6/8	6/15	6/22	6/29	7/6	7/13	7/20	7/27
Place	Contestant	Result												
1	Leandro Lopes	N/A	N/A	Top 10	N/A	Safe	Safe	Safe	Safe	Safe	Safe	Safe	Safe	Winner
2	Lucas Poletto	Top 10	N/A	N/A	N/A	Safe	Safe	Bottom 3	Safe	Bottom 2	Safe	Bottom 2	Safe	Runner-up
3	Osnir Alves	Top 10	N/A	N/A	N/A	Safe	Bottom 3	Safe	Bottom 3	Safe	Bottom 2	Safe	Elim	
4	Vanessa Oliveira	N/A	Top 10	N/A	N/A	Bottom 3	Bottom 2	Bottom 2	Bottom 2	Bottom 3	Safe	Elim		
5	Paulo Neto	Top 10	N/A	N/A	N/A	Bottom 2	Safe	Safe	Safe	Safe	Elim			
6	Angel Duarte	N/A	N/A	Top 10	N/A	Safe	Safe	Safe	Safe	Elim				
7	Giovana Félix	N/A	N/A	Top 10	N/A	Safe	Safe	Safe	Elim					
8	Davison Batista	N/A	Elim	N/A	Top 10	Safe	Safe	Elim						
9	Thaís Moreira	N/A	Top 10	N/A	N/A	Safe	Elim							
10	Pollyana Papel	N/A	Top 10	N/A	N/A	Elim								
Wild; Card	Joseane Nogueira	N/A	Elim	N/A	Elim									
Wild; Card	Karina Silva	Elim	N/A	N/A	Elim									
Wild; Card	Larissa Raci	Elim	N/A	N/A	Elim									
Wild; Card	Ludmila Anjos	N/A	N/A	Elim	Elim									
Wild; Card	Marielhe Borges	N/A	N/A	Elim	Elim									
Wild; Card	Reginaldo Paulino	Elim	N/A	N/A	Elim									
Wild; Card	Talita Garcia	N/A	Elim	N/A	Elim									
Semi- Final 3	Alan Santos	N/A	N/A	Elim										
Semi- Final 3	Lana Oliveira	N/A	N/A	Elim										
Semi- Final 3	Paulo Azevedo	N/A	N/A	Elim										
Semi- Final 3	Polyanna Hellena	N/A	N/A	Elim										
Semi- Final 3	Ruy Felipe	N/A	N/A	Elim										
Semi- Final 2	Diogo Lima	N/A	Elim											
Semi- Final 2	Gabriel Chagas	N/A	Elim											
Semi- Final 2	Gisele Dias	N/A	Elim											
Semi- Final 2	Márcio Bellini	N/A	Elim											
Semi- Final 1	Ebert Rodrigues	Elim												
Semi- Final 1	Fernanda Azevedo	Elim												
Semi- Final 1	Juliana Souza	Elim												
Semi- Final 1	Millane Fortes	Elim												
