= Little Memphis Blues Orchestra =

US musical group

Little Memphis Blues Orchestra (also known as L.M.B.O. or LiMBO) is the band formerly known as the Taylor Hicks Band, assembled by Taylor Hicks two years before he won American Idol in 2006. The band was initially formed in Alabama, but has since based themselves throughout the Southern United States and, later (after American Idol), nationwide. The band features Brian Less on keyboard/piano/vocals, Sam Gunderson on lead guitar/vocals, Mitch Jones on bass guitar, Zippy Dieterich on drums/vocals, and Jeff Lopez on saxophone/backing vocals.

The band toured the United States during the American Idol concert tour, playing numerous after-parties that sometimes featured Hicks on stage, along with Hicks's friends and fellow American Idol finalists, Elliott Yamin, Ace Young, Bucky Covington, and Chris Daughtry (they, along with Hicks, made up the top five men). One of the LiMBO "after-party" concerts was at Workplay Theatre in Taylor Hicks and LiMBO's hometown of Birmingham. This concert was the night of the Birmingham stop of the American Idol tour, and Hicks, Yamin, Young, and Covington appeared with the band. The entire performance was recorded on audio and video, and LiMBO released both a CD and DVD version of that performance.

The LiMBO name has a double meaning. As Taylor Hicks gained fame during the American Idol competition, the remaining members of the Taylor Hicks Band continued to play professionally. To ensure no one assumed that Taylor Hicks would appear with the band, they decided on a name change. The keyboard player, Brian Less, is originally from Memphis, Tennessee, and is shorter compared to his bandmates; Taylor Hicks (who played basketball in high school) and Sam Gunderson are relatively taller, so it unintentionally presented Less, Hicks, and Gunderson as the frontmen for the band. Less than acquired the nickname "Little Memphis." The other meaning was that the band was in limbo, not knowing when or if Hicks would return.
