= In Our Time (Wolfe book) =

1980 book by Tom Wolfe

- First edition
- Author: Tom Wolfe
- Language: English
- Publisher: Farrar, Straus & Giroux
- Publication date: 1980
- Publication place: United States
- Media type: Print
- Pages: 119
- ISBN: 0-330-26224-6
- OCLC: 16603218

In Our Time is a book of essays and illustrations written and drawn by Tom Wolfe, published in 1980.
