= The Distance (Taylor Hicks album) =

Studio album by Taylor Hicks
- Released: March 10, 2009
- Recorded: 2008 at Glenwood Place Studios, Los Angeles, California
- Genres: Blue-eyed soul, pop
- Length: 41:57
- Label: Modern Whomp
- Producer: Simon Climie

Taylor Hicks chronology
Early Works (2008)	The Distance (2009)

Singles from The Distance
- 1. "What's Right Is Right" Released: January 27, 2009; 2. "Seven Mile Breakdown" Released: May 4, 2009

The Distance is the second studio album by American blue-eyed soul singer Taylor Hicks, released on March 10, 2009. It is the first release by Hicks under his own independent label, Modern Whomp, after parting ways with Arista Records.

The Distance was produced by Simon Climie and features eleven tracks on the main version, including the single "What's Right Is Right" and "Nineteen", which tells the story of a teenage football star who joins the armed forces after the 9/11 attacks. Several tracks feature Nathan East and Doyle Bramhall II, both longtime members of Eric Clapton's band. "Seven Mile Breakdown" was originally recorded by Alabama indie band Spoonful James. It debuted at number 58 on the Billboard 200 and number five on the Top Independent Albums charts with sales of 9,000 copies in its first week of release.

== Reception ==
Professional ratings
Review scores
Source	Rating
Allmusic	link
Entertainment Weekly	(C) link
People Magazine	(March 23, 2009 issue)

Critical reception to the album was mixed to positive, with publications like Allmusic saying that "Hicks doesn't show great sensitivity as an interpreter(...) but as an entertainer he pulls out all the stops, determined to get every last person in the joint to crack a smile. It's a trait that served him well in those small clubs and on television, and it still serves him well here." Entertainment Weekly, however, gave the album a decidedly negative review, with Entertainment Weekly writer Simon Vozick-Levinson stating that Hicks is "no worse than any of the countless other graying dudes singing what they believe to be the blues in hotel lobbies and dive bars across the nation".

== Track listing ==
No.	Title	Writer(s)	Length
1.	"The Distance"	Taylor Hicks, Gary Nicholson, Kenny Greenberg	4:05
2.	"What's Right Is Right"	Simon Climie, Dennis Morgan	3:48
3.	"New Found Freedom"	Hicks, Climie, Morgan	4:25
4.	"Nineteen"	Jeffrey Steele, Tom Hambridge, Nicholson	3:10
5.	"Once Upon a Lover"	Hicks, Climie, Morgan	4:09
6.	"Seven Mile Breakdown"	Hicks, Wynn Christian	4:18
7.	"Maybe You Should"	Hicks, Nicholson, Mike Reid	3:45
8.	"Keepin' It Real"	Hicks, Delbert McClinton, Nicholson, Hambridge	3:46
9.	"I Live on a Battlefield"	Paul Carrack, Nick Lowe	4:08
10.	"Wedding Day Blues"	Hicks, Alan Little	2:45
11.	"Woman's Got Have It" (Featuring Elliott Yamin)	Darryl Carter, Bobby Womack, Linda Cooke	3:38

Bonus tracks
No.	Title	Writer(s)	Length
12.	"Yes We Can" (iTunes bonus track)	Allen Toussaint
13.	"Hide nor Hair" (Wal-Mart exclusive)	Ray Charles	3:41
14.	"Indiscriminate Act of Kindness" (Target exclusive)	Foy Vance	7:22

== Singles ==
- "What's Right Is Right" peaked at number twenty-four on the US Billboard Hot Adult Contemporary Tracks.
- "Seven Mile Breakdown" was released on May 4, 2009 to country radio.

== Personnel ==
- Taylor Hicks – vocals, acoustic piano, harmonica
- Toby Baker – keyboards, acoustic piano, Fender Rhodes, Wurlitzer electric piano, strings
- Tim Carmon – acoustic piano, Hammond B3 organ, backing vocals
- Doyle Bramhall II – guitars, electric guitar, dobro, slide guitar
- Simon Climie – acoustic guitar, backing vocals
- Alan Little – guitars
- Josh Smith – guitars
- Michael Thompson – guitars, acoustic guitar, dobro
- Jay Leach – pedal steel guitar
- Nathan East – bass
- Abraham Laboriel – bass, nylon guitar
- Abe Laboriel Jr. – drums, percussion
- Nicky Shaw – programming, percussion
- Dennis Caplinger – percussion, violin solo
- Charlie Sanchez – percussion
- Sharon White – percussion
- Brian Gallagher – saxophones
- Simon Gardner – trumpet, flugelhorn
- Elliott Yamin – vocals (12)

=== Production ===
- Simon Climie – producer, arrangements, engineer, mixing
- Don Murray – engineer, mixing
- Joel Evenden – engineer, mixing, digital editing, mix assistant
- Isha Erskine – assistant engineer
- Bob Ludwig – mastering at Gateway Mastering (Portland, Maine)
- Rick Di Loretto – package design

== Chart performance ==
The album sold approximately 9,000 copies in the US during its first official week of released; debuting at number 58 on the Billboard 200 and number five on the Top Independent Albums chart. It has sold 52,000 copies to date.

Chart (2009)	Peak position
U.S. Billboard 200	58
U.S. Billboard Top Independent Albums	5
