= Jess Cates =

American songwriter

- Born: July 27, 1976 (age 50); Nashville, Tennessee, United States
- Occupation: Songwriter

Jess Cates (born July 27, 1976 in Nashville, Tennessee) is an American songwriter who has co-written songs such as Nick Lachey's "What's Left of Me" and the Backstreet Boys' 2005 hit "Incomplete". In recent years, Cates has worked in a songwriting team with Lindy Robbins and Emanuel Kiriakou. In its 2008 "Roundup", ASCAP characterized the trio as "award-winning, multi-platinum selling songwriters."

Other artists who have recorded his songs include Kevin Paige, Jordin Sparks, Britt Nicole, The Jonas Brothers, LeAnn Rimes, Clay Aiken, Kimberley Locke, The Afters, Bo Bice, JC Chasez, Taylor Hicks, plus international artists including Australian Idol's Shannon Noll and Dean Geyer, Canadian Idol's Melissa O'Neil and Ryan Malcolm, Germany's Stanfour and Tobias Regner, and Latin singer David Bisbal.

Cates wrote five songs for Nick Lachey's album "What's Left of Me", including the first two singles, the title track, and "I Can't Hate You Anymore". In April 2007, Cates received an ASCAP Award for "What's Left of Me" being among the most performed songs of 2006. In 2002, Cates was recognized by ASCAP for cowriting "I Don't Want to Go", one of the year's most frequently performed Christian songs.

In 2008, he co-wrote David Archuleta's debut single, "Crush". Ben Ratliff of The New York Times wrote that it was one of the "few dollops of good writing" on Archuleta's debut album.

== Songs ==
David Archuleta:
"Crush"
"Falling Stars"

Elliott Yamin:
"You Say"

Martina McBride
"I Just Call You Mine"

Ashley Tisdale
"Tell Me Lies"

Tyrone Wells
"In Between the Lines"

Nick Lachey:
"What's Left of Me"
"I Can't Hate You Anymore"
"Resolution"
"Run to Me"
"Outside Looking In"

Jordin Sparks:
"Next to You"
"Worth The Wait"

Jonas Brothers:
"Underdog"
"Take a Breath"
"Fall (from the JONAS L.A. soundtrack)"

Backstreet Boys:
"Incomplete"
"Inconsolable"
"Any Other Way"
"Everything But Mine"
"One in a Million"
"You Can Let Go"
"Downpour"
"In Pieces"
"Dont Turn Out the Lights

Kimberley Locke:
"Change"

LeAnn Rimes:
"Strong"
"For the First Time"
"Break Me Down"

JC Chasez:
"You Ruined Me"

Ty Herdon:
"In the Arms of the One Who Loves Me"
"Hide"

The Afters:
"Falling into Place"

John-Mark:
"On Your Side"
"Hard Enough to Miss You"

Bo Bice:
"Hold On to Me"

Clay Aiken:
"I Will Carry You"
"I Survived You"

Taylor Hicks:
"Just to Feel That Way"

Stanfour:
"I Will Be" "Lonely Life"

Bebo Norman:
"Disappear"

Sabrina Carpenter:
“Silver Nights”

== See also ==
- Songs written or co-written by Jess Cates
