= Billy Earl McClelland =

American musician

Billy Earl McClelland (September 19, 1950 – October 3, 2013) was an American session guitarist and songwriter.

== Overview ==
Born in Cusseta, Alabama, United States, McClelland left high school to go to Nashville, Tennessee, and was signed by a record label. As a session guitarist in Nashville, he worked with B.J. Thomas, Willie Nelson, Tony Joe White, Hank Snow, Townes Van Zandt, Brenda Lee, and Mel Tillis. He wrote songs for Hank Williams Jr., Waylon Jennings, Jerry Jeff Walker, T.G. Sheppard, Sawyer Brown and Delbert McClinton.

Eventually, he released a rock-oriented record on Elektra. A second album, 'Ready or Not', remains unreleased by the label.

Later, McClelland moved to Memphis, Tennessee at the urging of Skip McQuinn. While there, his passion for the blues led him to produce the first Big Bill Morganfield recording, engineered by Mike Durff and Tyler Bell.

McClelland continued to be a regular in clubs and festivals throughout the Southeast. McClelland also worked with Bo Diddley and Albert Collins. His album Judgment Day (2000) received critical acclaim from all of the major blues magazines.

McClelland helmed Mojo:Saint, a contemporary blues project, along with veteran drummer David Brazeal and bassist Jack Hall [Wet Willie].

He was inducted into the Alabama Music Hall of Fame.

McClelland died on October 3, 2013, from complications after a heart attack at the East Alabama Medical Center in Opelika, Alabama.

== Discography ==
- Billy Burnette, Polydor Records, 1979, As a member of Billy Burnette's group
- Zero Hindsight, Elektra Asylum Records, 1980
- 'Ready or Not', Elektra Asylum Records, unreleased - 1980
- Murdered By Love, 1986, as a member of the band Blue Monday
- For the Fathers of Rock and Roll, Personal Records, 1986
- Nineteen Years Old: A Tribute to Muddy Waters, Taxim, 1999, producer and member of Big Bill Morganfield's band
- Judgment Day, MojoBlues Records, 2000
- Now And Then, Then And Now, Chips Moman Records, 2001, as a member of Billy Joe Royal's band
- Even More Good Whiskey Blues, Taxim, compilation, 2005
- Blues From the Heart of Dixie, Taxim, compilation, 2006
- Floral Park Bootleg, Jammates Records, 2006
