= SoulO =

Studio album by Nick Lachey
- Released: November 11, 2003
- Genre: Pop; dance-pop; pop rock
- Length: 46:59
- Label: Universal
- Producer: Walter Afanasieff; Gary Baker; Stuart Brawley; Guy Chambers; David Eriksen; Trina Harmon; Nick Lachey; Anthony Little; The Matrix; Steve Power

Nick Lachey chronology
| SoulO (2003) | What's Left of Me (2006) |

Singles from SoulO
- 1. "Shut Up" Released: 24 June 2003; 2. "This I Swear" Released: 6 April 2004

Professional ratings
Review scores
| Source | Rating |
|---|---|
| Allmusic | link |
| Entertainment Weekly | B− link |
| Slant Magazine | link |
| Stylus Magazine | C+ link |

SoulO is Nick Lachey's debut album as a solo artist, after leaving the boy band 98 Degrees. The album was released in the US on November 11, 2003 on Universal Records.

"Could You Love" was recorded earlier by Youngstown on their second album, Down For the Get Down (2001).

== Track listing ==
1. "Shut Up" (Nick Lachey, Lauren Christy, Graham Edwards, Scott Spock) – 3:23
2. "Let Go" (Lachey, Christy, Edwards, Spock) – 3:41
3. "This I Swear" (David Eriksen, John Reid) – 4:33
4. "Could You Love" (Eriksen) – 4:04
5. "Carry On" (Lachey, Guy Chambers) – 3:35
6. "You're the Only Place" (Billy Mann, Walter Afanasieff) – 4:47
7. "Can't Stop Loving You" (Lachey, Chambers) – 3:34
8. "Edge of Eternity" (Lachey, Chambers) – 3:59
9. "It's Alright" (Lachey, Christy, Edwards, Spock) – 3:09
10. "I Fall in Love Again" (Gary Baker, Anthony Little, Kevin Richardson, George Teren) – 4:01
11. "Open Your Eyes" (Lachey, Dan Hill, Keith Stegall) – 4:11
12. "On and On" (Lachey) – 3:40
13. "Think I'm Losing You" (Japan bonus track)
14. "Uh Huh (Yeah Yeah)" (Japan bonus track)

== Singles ==
- "Shut Up" was the debut single from Nick Lachey's debut solo album SoulO. The single was a commercial failure in the United States, failing to chart. Video directed by Constantine Paraskevopoulos.

The first version of the music video featured a group of female dancers (including Kimberly Wyatt from The Pussycat Dolls) dancing around Lachey and featured several close-ups of him. Lachey filmed the video, and later won the right to redo it.

The second video featured Dax Shepard and Jennifer Morrison living in a trailer outside of Lachey's real-life home.

- "This I Swear" was the second single from Nick Lachey's debut album SoulO. The ballad has lyrics in which he expressed how he felt about the marriage and love he had for his then wife, Jessica Simpson. Part of the song lyrics includes "I will love you, until forever, until death do us part we'll be together". The song was also the theme song to the hit reality TV show Newlyweds: Nick and Jessica. It was sent to radio in the United States on September 28, 2003.

"This I Swear" reached #11 on the Billboard Bubbling Under Hot 100. Despite being heavily promoted, the single became Lachey's second single to not chart on the Billboard Hot 100.

== Chart performance ==
The album was expected to be successful because the album was released during the popularity of Lachey's television show, Newlyweds. However, despite being heavily promoted, the album debuted at #51 on the Billboard 200, selling only 28,000 copies in its first week. The album was considered a commercial failure, both in terms of sales and chart performance; the album sold 171,000 copies in the United States and stayed on the Billboard 200 for just 11 weeks.

| Year | Chart | Peak position |
|---|---|---|
| 2003 | Billboard 200 (US) | #51 |
