= Taylor Hicks =

American musician

- Hicks in 2023

Background information
- Born: Taylor Reuben Hicks; October 7, 1976 (age 50); Birmingham, Alabama, U.S.
- Genres: Blue-eyed soul; blues rock; country; pop
- Occupations: Singer-songwriter; restaurateur; advocate
- Instruments: Vocals; guitar; harmonica; B3 organ
- Years active: 1995–present
- Labels: Arista; 19 (2006–2008); Modern Whomp (2008–present)
- Formerly of: Little Memphis Blues Orchestra
- Website: taylorhicks.com

Taylor Reuben Hicks (born October 7, 1976) is an American singer who won the fifth season of American Idol in May 2006. Hicks got his start as a professional musician in his late teens and performed around the Southeastern United States for well over the span of a decade, during which he also released two independent albums. Upon winning Idol, he was signed to Arista Records, under which his self-titled major label debut was released on December 12, 2006.

His energetic stage performances and influences derived from classic rock, blues, and R&B music had earned him a following of devout fans dubbed the "Soul Patrol". Hicks performed on Broadway in 2008 and on national tour in 2009 in Grease playing Teen Angel, the role originated by Alan Paul. He is the first Idol winner to secure a long-term residency at a Las Vegas casino. He began his residency at Bally's Las Vegas in June 2012 and moved to a larger venue, Paris Las Vegas, in January 2013. In 2016, Hicks began hosting the INSP original series State Plate, and released a single, "Six Strings and Diamond Rings", in 2017.

== Early life ==
Taylor Hicks was born in Birmingham, Alabama, on October 7, 1976, to Bradley Hicks and Pamela Dickinson. He and his family moved to the suburb of Hoover when he was eight years old. His hair started turning gray by the time he was 14. His parents divorced, and stepmother Linda shared custody of their son until he came of age. Hicks has suggested his difficult childhood as the reason for his turning to soul and blues music for solace. He has a younger half-brother, Sean, who later convinced him to audition for American Idol.

He bought his first harmonica when he was 16, for $2 at a flea market in Bessemer, Alabama, and taught himself to play blues harp. He discovered that he possessed perfect pitch when he was able to recognize the pitches of ordinary noises and mimic them on the harmonica. Hicks was 18 when he wrote his first song, "In Your Time", and he taught himself to play electric guitar and the church organ when he was 19. When he was in college, he played in a Widespread Panic cover band.

Hicks graduated from Hoover High School in 1995. He played varsity baseball, soccer, and basketball while studying in Hoover. He then pursued a major in business and journalism at Auburn University.

== Career ==
=== Independent music ===
"The Fall" excerpt
"The Fall" is an acoustic ballad about a painful, failed relationship.

While in college, Hicks was part of a band called Passing Through, which he later quit to start his own band. In 1997, he independently recorded In Your Time, an album which included both studio and live tracks. In 2000, he moved to pursue a music career in Nashville, Tennessee, where he worked with Nashville veterans Billy Earl McClelland and Percy Sledge to record a three-track demo but was unable to find a label that would sign him. He left Nashville after a year due to what he called the "oversaturation of the market". Hicks returned to Alabama and launched a professional music career, performing at various venues and parties mostly around the Southeastern United States, including The War Eagle Supper Club (a popular college bar) in Auburn, Alabama. Hicks has performed with the likes of Widespread Panic, James Brown, Tom Petty, Jackson Browne, Drive-By Truckers, Robert Randolph, Snoop Dogg and Keb Mo. He also performed in the huge infield of Talladega Superspeedway in 2004 during a NASCAR race weekend.

He recorded, produced, and released a second album, Under the Radar, in 2005. Despite releasing two albums prior to appearing on American Idol, he did not violate their requirements for contestants, as he had never held a recording contract.

Hicks has allowed audience members to record his concerts for personal, non-commercial use, and has authorized the Internet Archive to create a section for fans to upload and share their recordings. The Archive does not accept the upload of concerts recorded after January 1, 2006, due to the terms of his American Idol contract.

=== American Idol 2006 ===
Hicks auditioned for American Idol in Las Vegas, Nevada, on October 10, 2005. Hicks passed the audition with the approval of judges Randy Jackson and Paula Abdul, but not Simon Cowell, who said that Hicks would never make it to the final round. On Hicks's first performance for the voting public, Cowell called back to this quote, admitting he was wrong.

On the May 10, 2006, results show, Hicks along with Katharine McPhee and Elliott Yamin, were announced as the top 3 finalists. On May 12, Idol producers brought Hicks to Birmingham for a weekend of promotional events including television interviews for the local Fox affiliate, a downtown parade, concerts, and an audience with Governor Bob Riley. May 12 was proclaimed "Taylor Hicks Day" and Hicks was given the Key to the City. Also on May 12, Gov. Riley issued a proclamation making May 16 "Taylor Hicks Day".

Hicks was named the new American Idol on May 24, 2006, winning the title over McPhee, with over 63.4 million votes cast in total. The proclamation was aired to a worldwide audience of 200 million television viewers. With his win at age 29, Hicks became the oldest contestant to win American Idol. He was also the first male contestant to win the competition without ever being in the bottom two or three.

In June 2006, Ford Motor Company, the show's major sponsor, signed Hicks to promote Ford's "Drive on Us" year-end sales event. He was also named Hottest Bachelor by People for 2006, appearing on the magazine's cover.

Week	Theme	Song Sung	Artist	Result
Top 24	12 Men	"Levon"	Elton John	Advanced
Top 20	10 Men	"Easy"	Commodores	Advanced
Top 16	8 Men	"Takin' It to the Streets"	The Doobie Brothers	Advanced
Top 12	Songs of Stevie Wonder	"Living for the City"	Stevie Wonder	Safe
Top 11	'50s Hits	"Not Fade Away"	The Crickets	Safe
Top 10	2000s Songs	"Trouble"	Ray LaMontagne	Safe
Top 9	Country Music	"Take Me Home, Country Roads"	John Denver	Safe
Top 8	Songs of Queen	"Crazy Little Thing Called Love"	Queen	Safe
Top 7	Great American Songbook	"You Send Me"	Sam Cooke	Safe
Top 6	Love Songs	"Just Once"	James Ingram	Safe
Top 5	Year They Were Born; Current Billboard Top 10	"Play That Funky Music" "Something"	Wild Cherry; The Beatles	Safe
Top 4	Songs of Elvis Presley	"Jailhouse Rock" "In the Ghetto"	Elvis Presley	Safe
Top 3	Clive Davis's Choice; Judges' Choice; Idol's Choice	"Dancing in the Dark" "You Are So Beautiful" "Try a Little Tenderness"	Bruce Springsteen; Joe Cocker; Otis Redding	Safe
Top 2	Finale	"Living for the City" "Levon" "Do I Make You Proud?"	Stevie Wonder; Elton John; Taylor Hicks	Winner

== Post-Idol career ==
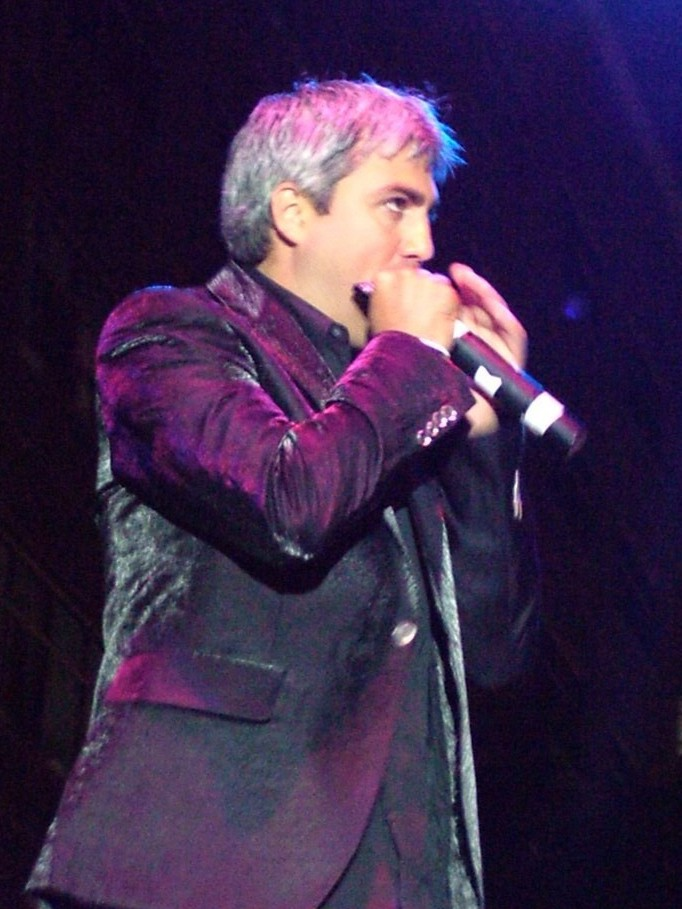
Hicks played harmonica and guitar on every date of the American Idols LIVE! Tour.

Hicks signed a recording contract with 19 Recordings Limited/Arista Records, managed by American Idol creator Simon Fuller, in May 2006. Hicks's debut single "Do I Make You Proud" debuted on the number one spot on the Billboard Hot 100 and was subsequently certified gold by the RIAA.

Hicks joined his fellow Top 10 Idol finalists on the American Idols LIVE! Tour which ran from July to September. The members of the former Taylor Hicks Band, formed by Hicks two years prior, regrouped as the Little Memphis Blues Orchestra and shadowed the Idols' tour route. Hicks occasionally appeared as a "special guest" when circumstances permitted, and was accompanied at times by the other Idols, such as Elliott Yamin, Chris Daughtry, Ace Young, and Bucky Covington.

In August 2006, Hicks's lawyers sued a producer with whom he worked in Nashville, for redistributing without permission songs that Hicks had copyrighted in 1997. The lawsuit was dropped when the masters were handed over to Hicks.

Hicks received a US$750,000 deal to write his memoir. Titled Heart Full of Soul: An Inspirational Memoir About Finding Your Voice and Finding Your Way and ghostwritten by Rolling Stone writer David Wild, the book was released in July 2007 by Random House.

On June 6, 2008, Hicks joined the cast of the Broadway musical Grease in the Brooks Atkinson Theatre. He played the role of "Teen Angel". Once his 18-month tour in the traveling Broadway show 'Grease' ended, Hicks performed in over 20 live shows.

=== 2006–2008: Taylor Hicks and Early Works ===
Studio recording sessions for the eponymous major label debut Taylor Hicks ran in Calabasas, California, between October and November 2006, and took six weeks in total. The album was released on December 12, 2006, and debuted at the number two spot on the Billboard 200 charts. It was certified as a platinum album by the RIAA on January 17, 2007. Hicks embarked on a three-month US promotional tour for his album that started on February 21 in Jacksonville, Florida, and ended in Seattle, Washington on May 12.

Arista Records confirmed in January 2008 that it had dropped Hicks from its roster. Hicks had, at that stage, the lowest selling American Idol winner's album.

In 2008, Hicks signed a distribution deal with Vanguard/Welk records to distribute a compilation album Early Works. He also starred in Grease in the national tour as the Teen Angel after playing the role on Broadway. Early Works was released on August 12, 2008.

=== 2009–present: The Distance ===
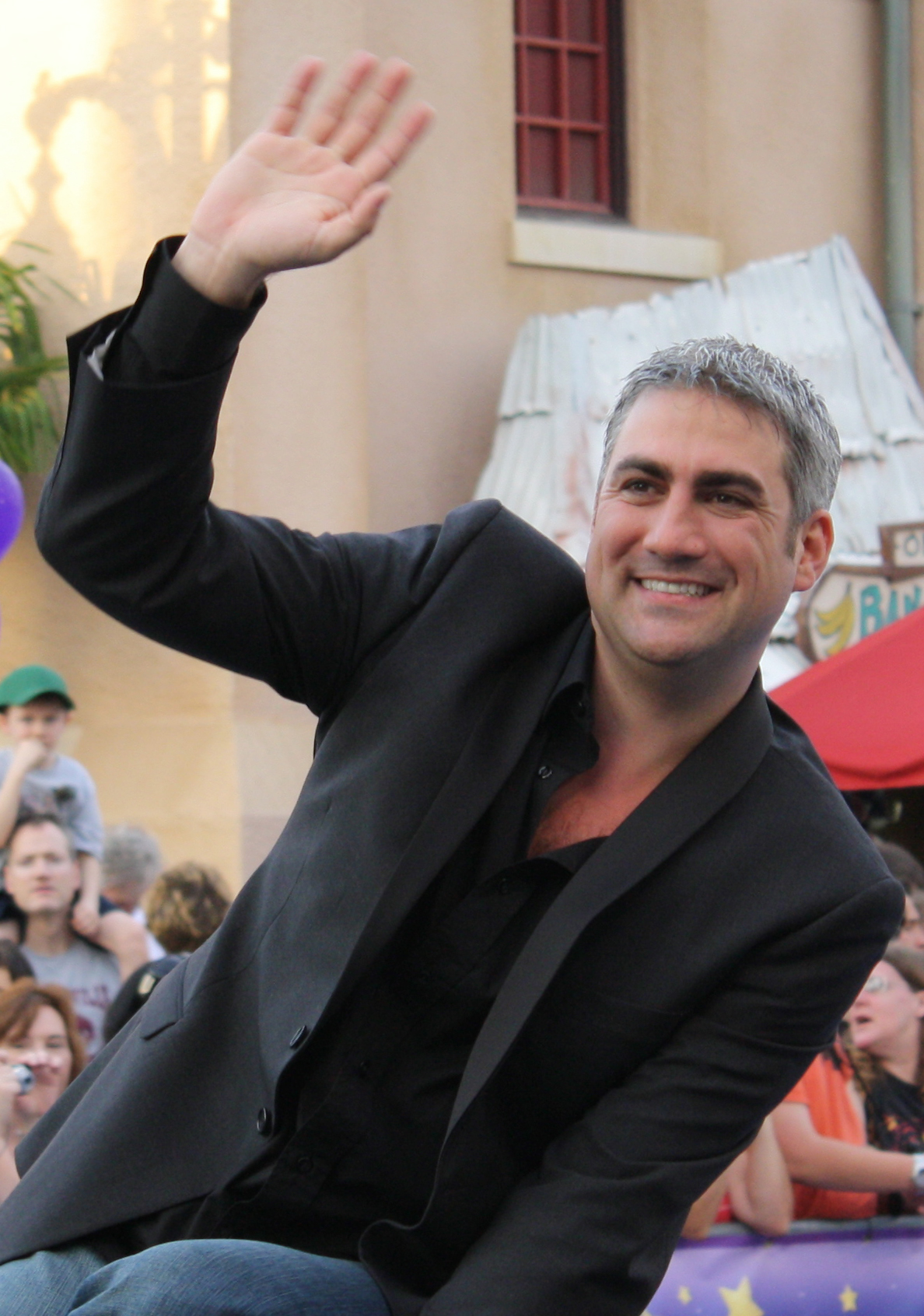
Hicks in the American Idol motorcade at Walt Disney World in February 2009.

In 2009 Hicks released his second album, The Distance, on his own label, Modern Whomp Records, on March 10, 2009. The first single, "What's Right Is Right", was added to AC adds on January 27, 2009. The single reached number 24 on Hot Adult Contemporary Tracks. It was produced by Simon Climie and Dennis Morgan.

In May 2009, Taylor Hicks made Forbes' "Top Ten earning American Idol stars" list, coming in at number 10, with over $300,000 earned from album sales and from his role as "Teen Angel" in the national tour of Grease.

In May 2011, Taylor Hicks opened Ore Drink and Dine restaurant in Birmingham, Alabama. Birmingham Magazine readers voted Ore as Birmingham's "Best New Restaurant" in the fall of 2011. Ore Drink and Dine re-opened as Saw's Juke Joint, a barbecue and live music bar, on October 30, 2012.

On June 14, 2011, Taylor Hicks performed at Bama Rising: A Benefit Concert For Alabama Tornado Recovery at the Birmingham Jefferson Convention Center. According to Billboard, the Bama Rising benefit concert raised an estimated $2.2 million for Alabama tornado relief efforts.

On April 19, 2012, Hicks appeared on American Idol and announced he would begin a one-year residency at Bally's in Las Vegas on June 26 that has been extended until December 2013. Entertainment Weekly magazine revealed that Hicks would be a celebrity contestant on Fox's dating show The Choice.

On August 30, 2012, Hicks performed for the 2012 Republican National Convention in Tampa, Florida.

Hicks was the first male Idol to be featured on a Grammy-winning album when he performed "Friday" on Jimmy Fallon's Blow Your Pants Off, which won for Best Comedy Album in 2013.

In July 2013, Hicks attended the Evolution 2013 fighting game tournament as a competitor for Super Smash Bros. Melee. Hicks finished tied for 257th overall out of 709 players.

In January 2017, Hicks recorded "Call Paul" — the theme song for ESPN's Paul Finebaum show.

In September 2017, Taylor Hicks premiered his song, "Six Strings and Diamond Rings" with Billboard Music, his first musical release in eight years.

Hicks hosted State Plate via the INSP channel for three seasons from 2016 to 2018 where he featured iconic dishes and ingredients from each state in the United States.

Hicks debuted in his starring role as Charlie Anderson in the Serenbe Playhouse production of Shenandoah in March 2019.

Hicks released the single, "Porch Swing", on February 20, 2023. Hicks made his Grand Ole Opry debut on June 16, 2023.

== Discography ==
- Under the Radar (2005)
- Taylor Hicks (2006)
- The Distance (2009)

== See also ==
- List of Billboard number-one singles
- List of artists who reached number one in the United States
- List of Billboard Hot 100 chart achievements and milestones
- List of Idols winners
