= Nick Lachey =

American singer, actor, producer and television personality

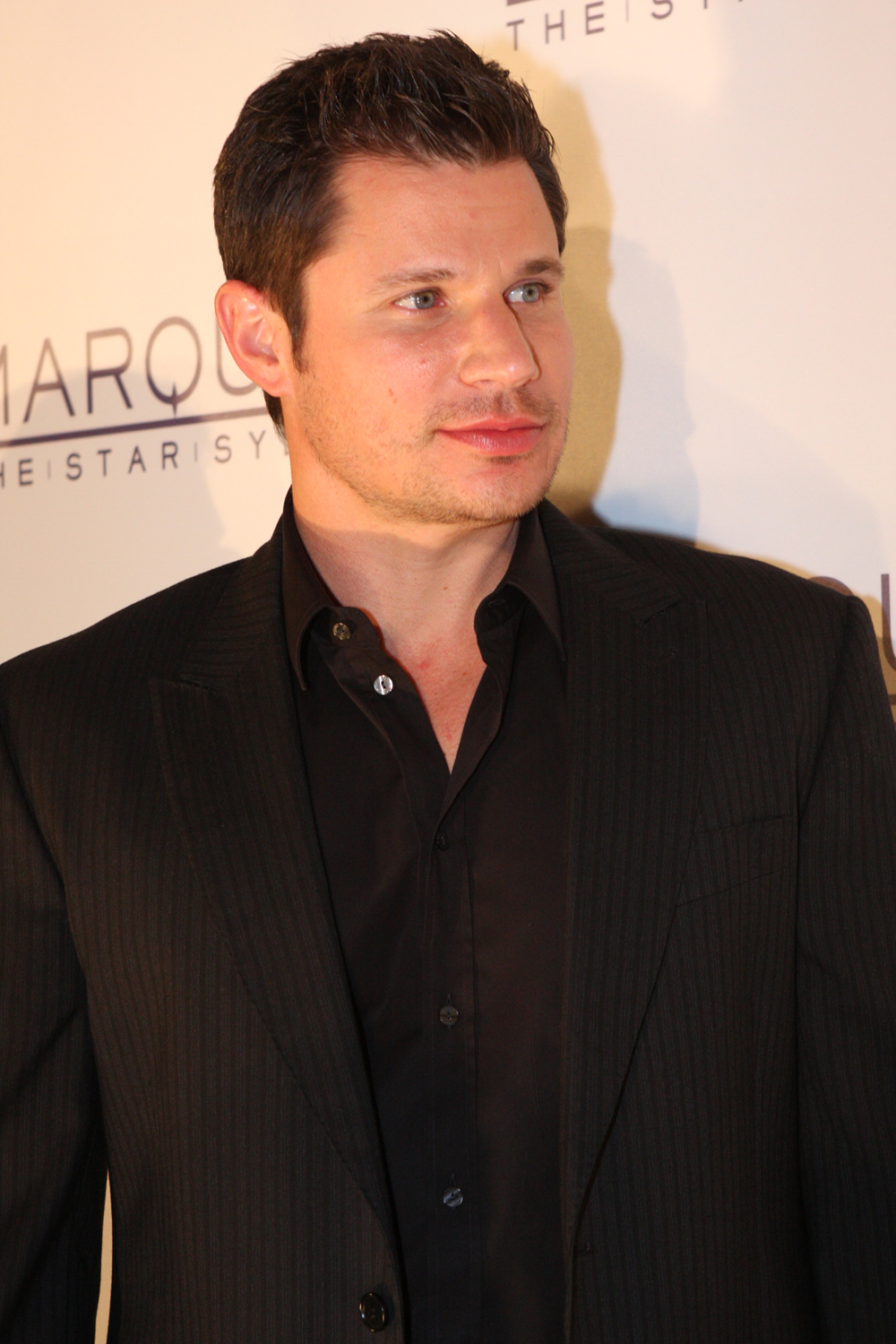
- Lachey in March 2012
- Born: Nicholas Scott Lachey; November 9, 1973 (age 53); Harlan, Kentucky, U.S.
- Occupations: Singer-songwriter; TV personality; producer; actor
- Years active: 1995–present
- Spouses: Jessica Simpson (m. 2002; div. 2006) Vanessa Minnillo (m. 2011)
- Children: 3
- Relatives: Drew Lachey (brother)
- Musical career
- Genres: Pop; pop rock; R&B
- Instrument: Vocals
- Labels: Motown; Universal; Jive; Zomba
- Member of: 98 Degrees

Nicholas Scott Lachey (/ləˈʃeɪ/ lə-SHAY; born November 9, 1973) is an American singer-songwriter, TV personality, producer and actor. He rose to fame as the lead singer of the multi-platinum-selling boyband 98 Degrees and later starred in the reality series Newlyweds: Nick and Jessica with his then-wife, Jessica Simpson. He has released four solo albums: SoulO, What's Left of Me, A Father's Lullaby, and Soundtrack of My Life. He also had a recurring role on the television series Charmed. He hosted NBC's The Sing-Off, co-hosted VH1's Big Morning Buzz Live from 2014 to 2015, and Nickelodeon's America's Most Musical Family, and co-hosts the Netflix shows Love Is Blind and The Ultimatum with his wife Vanessa Lachey. He is also the sole host of Perfect Match for Netflix. In 2021, Lachey won the fifth season of The Masked Singer.

== Early life ==
Nicholas Scott Lachey was born in Harlan, Kentucky, to Cathalyn (née Fopma) and John Lachey. He is the brother of singer and actor Drew Lachey, alongside whom he has worked closely. His maternal grandfather, Robert James Fopma, was of Dutch descent. Nick's other ancestry is English, Scottish, German, and distant Welsh and French. He attended Clovernook Elementary School in the Cincinnati suburb of North College Hill, Ohio, and the School for Creative and Performing Arts in Cincinnati. He attended Miami University in Oxford, Ohio, where he joined Sigma Alpha Epsilon. In the fall of 1992, he allegedly enrolled at the University of Southern California, according to a "statement" he made during his guest appearance on The Arsenio Hall Show on December 12, 2013.

== Career ==
Lachey started his professional singing career at Kings Island with best friend Justin Jeffre in the mid-1990s singing in a doo-wop singing group quartet throughout the park and water park. Lachey was a member of the boyband 98 Degrees along with his brother, Drew, Justin Jeffre, and Jeff Timmons. Their debut album was the self-titled 98 Degrees; however, the band's first real success came with their follow-up album 98 Degrees and Rising. 98 Degrees has sold over 10 million records. 98 Degrees performed a one-off summer reunion show in Hershey, Pennsylvania, at the Summer Mixtape Festival on August 18, 2012, their first concert in more than a decade.

During the summer of 2003, the reality show Newlyweds: Nick and Jessica, starring Lachey and then-wife Jessica Simpson, began airing on MTV. The couple starred in the television special The Nick and Jessica Variety Hour, which aired in 2004 and was compared to The Sonny & Cher Show. In 2005, Newlyweds won a People's Choice Award for Favorite Reality Show before wrapping shortly after. On November 11, 2003, his solo debut album, SoulO, was released. Despite being released during the success of Newlyweds, the album was a commercial failure. Lachey took a recurring role in the series Charmed where he played a dyslexic ghostwriter between 2004 and 2005.

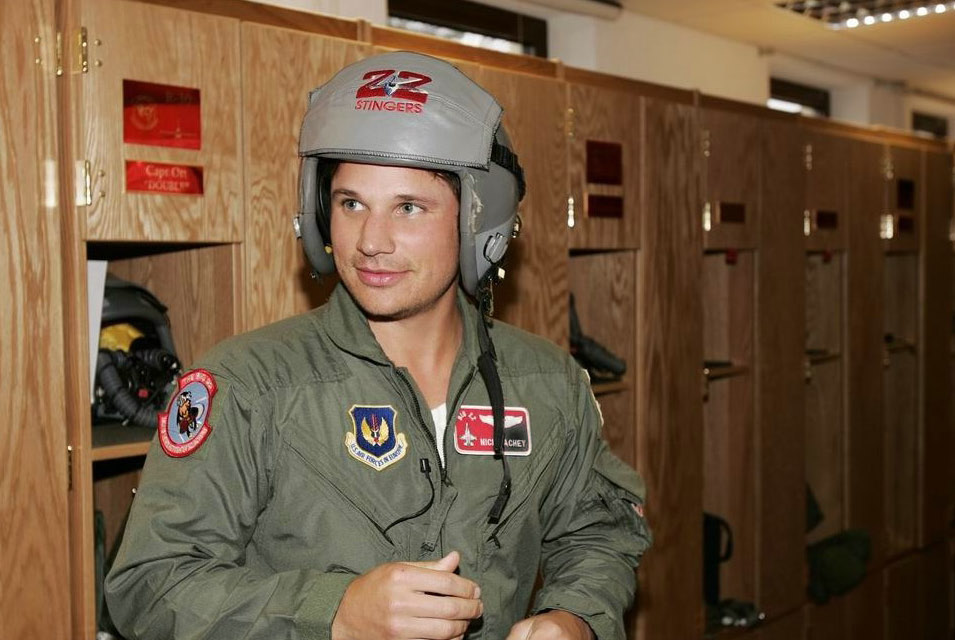
Lachey at Ramstein Air Base in April 2005

What's Left of Me was released on May 9, 2006, and debuted at number two on the Billboard 200. The album was certified Gold, after selling more than 500,000 copies domestically. The first single from the album was the title track, "What's Left of Me", released on February 21, 2006. The song became a hit, reaching a peak position of number six on the Billboard Hot 100. The video for "What's Left Of Me" featured former MTV VJ, Vanessa Minnillo. Lachey recorded "Ordinary Day" for the Oprah Winfrey-produced film, For One More Day. Lachey began working on his third solo album in 2007. Lachey also starred in a well-known TV series, One Tree Hill, as a singer at Red Bedroom Productions. It was announced in January 2010 that Jive Records had put his new album on hold indefinitely. In June 2010, Lachey confirmed that he had parted ways with Jive Records. In July 2010, Jive Records confirmed they had parted ways with Lachey.

Taking the Stage, a musical reality show documenting the personal lives of high school students at the School for Creative and Performing Arts, premiered on MTV in March 2009. It was produced by Lachey. In December 2009, he hosted The Sing-Off, a long form four-part American singing competition featuring a cappella groups, a role he reprised in December 2010 for the show's second and third seasons on NBC. Lachey was a contestant in the NBC celebrity reality competition series called Stars Earn Stripes.

On January 16, 2014, VH1 announced Lachey would resume hosting Big Morning Buzz Live, upon its return on March 3, 2014. On September 6, 2017, Lachey was announced as one of the celebrities who will take part in the 25th season of Dancing with the Stars, competing against his wife Vanessa. He was paired with professional dancer Peta Murgatroyd. Murgatroyd's husband, Maksim Chmerkovskiy, was paired with Vanessa. On October 23, Lachey and Murgatroyd were the fifth couple to be eliminated from the competition, leaving in ninth place.

Lachey hosted a musical competition on Nickelodeon titled America's Most Musical Family which premiered on November 1, 2019.

Lachey and his wife currently co-host the Netflix reality shows Love Is Blind and The Ultimatum: Marry or Move On. Lachey also hosts Perfect Match for Netflix, solo.

== Other ventures ==
Lachey is part owner of the Hollywood Fame, a team in the American Basketball Association that began play in fall 2006, and was part of an ownership group of the Tacoma Rainiers, the Seattle Mariners' Triple-A affiliate. Lachey is also a die-hard Cincinnati Bengals, Cincinnati Reds and Cincinnati Bearcats fan. On April 7, 2009, Lachey threw out the ceremonial first pitch for the MLB Opening Day game in Cincinnati, Ohio. On July 9, 2011, Lachey sang the National Anthem for the inaugural NASCAR Sprint Cup Series race at Kentucky Speedway in Sparta, Kentucky.

Lachey was among a group of investors that placed a marijuana legalization initiative on the Ohio ballot in 2015. The initiative sought exclusive grow rights for the group members while prohibiting all other cultivation except small amounts for personal use. Lachey appeared in a TV ad advocating for passage of the initiative, but it was ultimately defeated, though a later legalization referendum was approved by voters in 2023.

Lachey is on the Entertainment Council of the hunger-relief organization Feeding America.

In 2021, Lachey competed on season five of The Masked Singer as "Piglet". He was declared the winner of the season.

== Personal life ==
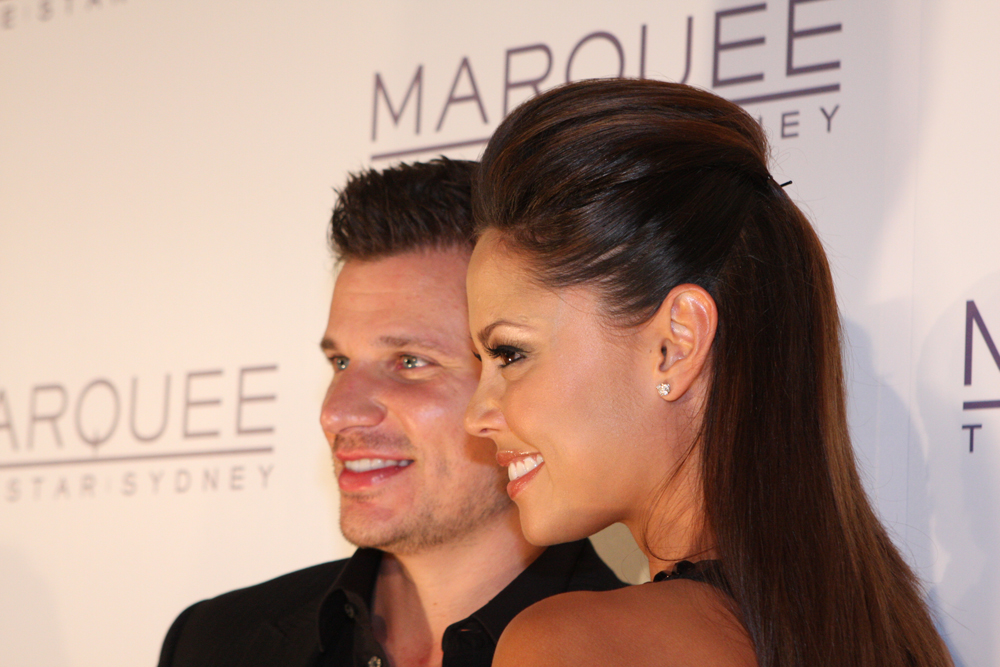
Lachey with wife Vanessa Lachey in March 2012

In December 1998, Lachey and fellow singer Jessica Simpson were introduced by their shared manager at a Christmas event. They subsequently began dating after meeting again at a Teen People event in January 1999, but broke up for five months beginning in April 2001 until getting back together following the September 11 attacks. They became engaged in February 2002, and married on October 26, 2002, in Austin, Texas. In November 2005, after months of tabloid speculation, Lachey and Simpson announced they were separating. Simpson filed for divorce on December 16, 2005, citing "irreconcilable differences". The couple's divorce was highly publicized worldwide and was reportedly finalized on June 30, 2006.

Soon after the release of "What's Left of Me", Lachey's 2006 music video starring Vanessa Minnillo, he and Minnillo began dating. They briefly broke up in June 2009, but had reunited by October 2009. Lachey and Minnillo became engaged in November 2010, and married on July 15, 2011, on Sir Richard Branson's private Necker Island in the British Virgin Islands. The wedding was filmed and televised on TLC. They have three children, born in September 2012, January 2015, and December 2016.

== Discography ==
98 Degrees

- 98° (1997)
- 98° and Rising (1998)
- Revelation (2000)
- 2.0 (2013)

Solo albums

- SoulO (2003)
- What's Left of Me (2006)
- A Father's Lullaby (2013)
- Soundtrack of My Life (2014)

== Filmography ==
=== Film ===
Year	Title	Role	Notes
2005	Bewitched	Vietnam Soldier	
2006	The Hard Easy	Jason Burns	
2007	Rise: Blood Hunter	Dwayne	

=== Television ===
Year	Title	Role	Notes
1998	Movie Surfers	Himself	Episode: "Mulan"
1999	As the World Turns	Himself	Episode: "May 21, 1999" & "May 24, 1999"
1999–06	Making the Video	Himself	Recurring guest
2000–01	Hollywood Squares	Himself/Panelist	Recurring panelist
2000–04	Mad TV	Himself	Guest (seasons 5 & 10)
2000–07	Christmas in Rockefeller Center	Himself	Recurring guest
2001	Who Wants to Be a Millionaire?	Himself/Contestant	Episode: "Top of the Charts Edition, Show 1 & 3-4"
2003	Room Raiders	Himself/Host	Episode: "Homecoming with Nick and Jessica"
2003	Punk'd	Himself	Episode: "Episode 1.6"
2003–05	Newlyweds: Nick and Jessica	Himself	Main cast
2004	Saturday Night Live	Himself/Host	Episode: "Jessica Simpson and Nick Lachey/G-Unit"
2004	The Apprentice	Himself	Episode: "Down to the Wire: Part 2"
2004	The Ashlee Simpson Show	Himself	Recurring cast (season 1)
2004	VH1 Big in '04 Awards	Himself	Host
2004	10 Things Every Guy Should Experience	Himself	Episode: "Kentucky Derby"
2004	American Dreams	Tom Jones	Episode: "To Tell the Truth"
2004	I'm with Her	Tyler Vance	Episode: "I'm Not With Her"
2004	Charmed	Leslie St. Claire	Recurring role (season 7)
2004	Hope & Faith	Chris	Episode: "Just-In Time"
2005	E! True Hollywood Story	Himself	Episode: "Jessica, Ashlee and the Simpson Family"
2005	B InTune TV	Himself	Episode: "Episode 1.4"
2006	VH1 News Presents	Himself	Episode: "Celebrity Pre-nups"
2006	Behind the Music	Himself	Episode: "Nick Lachey"
2006	VH1: All Access	Himself	Episode: "Celeb Breakups & Scandals"
2006	It Takes Two	Himself	Episode: "Series 1 Grand Final"
2006	Saturday Disney	Himself	Episode: "In the House with Nick Lachey"
2006	Born to Be...	Himself	Episode: "Nick Lachey"
2006	Overhaulin'	Himself	Episode: "Pop Star Steal"
2006	Twins	Charlie	Episode: "Himbo"
2007	Punk'd	Himself	Episode: "Episode 8.8"
2007	Clash of the Choirs	Himself	Main cast
2008	High School Musical: Get in the Picture	Himself	Host
2008	The Girls Next Door	Himself	Episode: "Kentucky Fried"
2009	One Tree Hill	Himself	Recurring role (season 6)
2009	Are You Smarter than a 5th Grader?	Himself/Contestant	Episode: "November 10, 2009"
2009	Super Dave's Spike Tacular	Himself	Episode: "Paint Ball Battle of the Decade"
2009–14	The Sing-Off	Himself	Host
2010	The Soup	Himself	Episode: "Episode 7.10"
2010	The Late Late Show with Craig Ferguson	Ronnie	Episode: "Episode 6.85"
2011	Macy's 4th of July Fireworks Spectacular	Host	Host
2011	Hawaii Five-0	Tyler	Episode: "Powa Maka Moana (Pirate)"
2012	Stars Earn Stripes	Himself/Contestant	Main cast
2012–16	Live with Kelly and Mark	Himself	Guest co-host
2013	The Price Is Right	Himself/Contestant	Episode: "February 18, 2013"
2013	The Winner Is	Himself	Host
2014–15	Big Morning Buzz Live	Himself	Recurring host (seasons 9–11)
2015	Lachey's: Raising the Bar	Himself	Co-host
2015	FABLife	Himself/Guest Co-Host	Episode: "Episode 1.50"
2016	Burgers, Brew & 'Que	Himself	Episode: "Phenomenal Philly Food Feast"
2017	Today	Himself/Co-anchor	Episode: "February 27, 2017"
2017	Battle of the Network Stars	Himself/Contestant	Episode: "Variety vs. TV Sex Symbols"
2017	Celebrity Family Feud	Himself/Contestant	Episode: "Episode 4.5"
2017	Hollywood Game Night	Himself/Celebrity Player	Episode: "The More You Ne-Yo"
2017	Hip Hop Squares	Himself	Recurring panelist
2017	Dancing with the Stars	Himself	Contestant (Season 25)
2017	Drop the Mic	Himself	Episode: "Episode 1.7"
2017	Top Chef Junior	Himself/Guest judge	Episode: "Field Day"
2017	Star vs. the Forces of Evil	Justin Towers (voice)	Episode: "Collateral Damage/Just Friends"
2018	The $100,000 Pyramid	Himself/Celebrity Player	Episode: "Episode 3.8"
2018–19	Miss USA	Himself	Co-host
2019	Sugar Rush	Himself/Guest judge	Episode: "Made with Love"
2019–20	America's Most Musical Family	Himself	Host
2019–22	Entertainment Tonight	Himself	Guest co-host
2020	IMDb Originals	Himself/Host	Episode: "Biggest Reveals From the "Love Is Blind" Reunion"
2020	Celebrity Show-Off	Himself/Contestant	Episode: "NeNe Leakes Is Here, Baby"
2020	I Can See Your Voice	Himself/Panelist	Episode: "Episode 1.1"
2020	Game Night with the Hamiltons	Himself	Episode: "It's a 'Love Is Blind' Reunion Full of '90s Nostalgia"
2020–present	Love Is Blind	Himself	Co-host
2021	This Is Pop	Himself	Episode: "The Boyz II Men Effect"
2021	Alter Ego	Himself	Judge
2021	The Masked Singer	Himself/Piglet	Contestant (Season 5)
2021	Well Done with Sebastian Maniscalco	Himself	Episode: "The Kids' Menu"
2022–present	The Ultimatum: Marry or Move On	Himself	Co-host
2023–present	Perfect Match	Himself	Host
2025	Krapopolis	Don Who Smiles (voice)	Episode: "Love Trap, Baby!"

== Awards and nominations ==
ASCAP Pop Music Awards

Year	Nominee / work	Award	Result
2007	"What's Left of Me"	Most Performed Song	Won

American Music Awards

Year	Nominee / work	Award	Result
2006	Himself	Favorite Male Pop/Rock Artist	Nominated

Groovevolt Music and Fashion Awards

Year	Nominee / work	Award	Result
2007	What's Left of Me	Best Pop Album - Male	Nominated
2007	"What's Left of Me"	Best Pop Song Performance - Male	Nominated

MTV Video Music Awards

Year	Nominee / work	Award	Result
2006	What's Left of Me	Best Male Video	Nominated

Teen Choice Awards

Year	Nominee / work	Award	Result
2000	"Where You Are" (with Jessica Simpson)	Choice Music: Love Song	Won
2003	Newlyweds: Nick and Jessica	Choice TV: Reality Hunk	Nominated
2004	Newlyweds: Nick and Jessica	Choice TV: Reality/Variety Star - Male	Nominated
2005	Himself	Choice TV: Personality - Male	Nominated
2005	Himself	Choice Red Carpet Fashion Icon: Male	Nominated
2006	Himself	Choice Red Carpet Fashion Icon: Male	Won
2006	Himself	Choice Hottie: Male	Nominated
2006	"What's Left of Me "	Choice Music: Love Song	Won
