= American Idol Season 5: Encores =

Compilation album by various artists
- Released: May 23, 2006
- Recorded: 2006
- Genres: Pop, rock
- Length: 47:19
- Label: RCA Records
- Producer: Various producers

Professional ratings
Review scores
Source	Rating
Allmusic	3/5 stars

American Idol Season 5: Encores is compilation album released on May 23, 2006 and contains one cover song from each of the top 12 finalists during season 5 of the television show American Idol. It is the only American Idol album that does not feature an ensemble track by all the contestants, and is the first year in which several individual finalists made the popular music charts. The album sold over 154,000 units in its first week, according to Nielsen SoundScan. It debuted at number three on the Billboard 200, behind the Disney Channel Original Movie's High School Musical Soundtrack and the Dixie Chicks' Taking the Long Way, thus becoming the best-selling debut any American Idol compilation disk. It was also number two on Top Soundtracks, number four on Top Digital Albums and number six on Top Internet.

With five albums in the Top 10, American Idol became the most successful soundtrack franchise of any motion picture or television program, beating out Star Wars. This Season 5 album sold 381,075 copies by September 2, 2006.

== Track listing ==
1. "What About Love" (Heart) – 3:45 Melissa McGhee
2. "Superstition" (Stevie Wonder) – 3:54 Bucky Covington
3. "I'm Every Woman" (Chaka Khan) – 3:44 Mandisa
4. "Wanted Dead or Alive" (Bon Jovi) – 4:33 Chris Daughtry
5. "Father Figure" (George Michael) – 5:46 Ace Young
6. "Takin' It to the Streets" (Doobie Brothers) – 3:39 Taylor Hicks
7. "Signed, Sealed, Delivered I'm Yours" (Stevie Wonder) – 2:55 Lisa Tucker
8. "Walkin' After Midnight" (Patsy Cline) – 2:59 Kellie Pickler
9. "Moody's Mood for Love" (James Moody) – 3:13 Elliott Yamin
10. "Think" (Aretha Franklin) – 2:45 Katharine McPhee
11. "Midnight Train to Georgia" (Gladys Knight & the Pips) – 3:33 Paris Bennett
12. "When I Fall in Love" (Doris Day) – 3:07 Kevin Covais

== Personnel ==
- Cheche Alara – keyboards
- Loren Gold – keyboards
- Tommy Barbarella – organ, keyboards
- Derek Bramble – organ, bass, organ, producer, engineer
- Johnny Britt – trumpet, horn arrangements
- Tom Ralls – trombone
- Derrick Edmondson – saxophone
- Michael Fell – harmonica
- Rob "Fonksta" Bacon – guitar
- Michael Herring – acoustic guitar
- Eamon Ryland – pedal steel, bottleneck guitar
- Greg Suran – guitar
- Eric Gorfain – violin
- Daphne Chen – violin
- Leah Katz – viola
- Richard Dodd – cello
- Dorian Crozier – percussion, drums, engineer, associate producer, drum programming
- Ramon Yslas – percussion
- Mabvuto Carpenter – backing vocals
- Belle Johnson – backing vocals
- Mika Lett – backing vocals
- Abraham McDonald- backing vocals
- Michael Anderson – bass, backing vocals, engineer, associate producer, production coordination
- Stephen Lu – orchestration
- Craig Burbidge – engineer, mixing
- Colin Miller – mixing
- David Kutch – mastering

== Charts ==
=== Weekly charts ===
Chart (2006)	Peak position
US Billboard 200	3
US Digital Albums (Billboard)	4
US Soundtrack Albums (Billboard)	2

=== Year-end charts ===
Chart (2006)	Position
US Billboard 200	163
US Soundtrack Albums (Billboard)	9
