= American Idols Live! Tour 2006 =

2006 summer concert tour

- Tour by American Idol
- Katharine McPhee, Lisa Tucker, Elliott Yamin, Mandisa, Bucky Covington; Ace Young, Kellie Pickler, Taylor Hicks; Paris Bennett, Chris Daughtry
- Start date: July 5, 2006
- End date: September 24, 2006
- No. of shows: 60
- Box office: US$35.8 million

American Idol concert chronology
- American Idols Live! Tour 2005 (2005); American Idols Live! Tour 2006 (2006); American Idols Live! Tour 2007 (2007)

American Idols Live! Tour 2006 was a summer and fall concert tour in the United States featuring the top 10 contestants of the fifth season of American Idol, which aired in 2006. It was sponsored by Kellogg Pop-Tarts. The tour started on July 5 and ended on September 24 covering 60 dates, the biggest tour thus far. Initially 39 dates were planned, but 21 extra dates were later added due to demand. It followed in the tradition of other American Idol summer tours following the completion of each season in May.

Runner-up Katharine McPhee missed the first 17 shows of the tour due to severe bronchitis and laryngitis, She also missed her first rescheduled show on July 27 in Pittsburgh, Pennsylvania due to cancelled flight caused by bad weather. At the concert in Charlotte, North Carolina, McPhee tripped backstage before going on, and a hair-line fracture to her left foot was later discovered when she was taken to a hospital after the show.

Bucky Covington was absent from the August 13 performance at the Savvis Center in St. Louis due to an illness. Kellie Pickler was absent from the first Atlanta show on August 3.

== Performers ==
Top 10
Taylor Hicks (winner)	Katharine McPhee (2nd place)
Elliott Yamin (3rd place)	Chris Daughtry (4th place)
Paris Bennett (5th place)	Kellie Pickler (6th place)
Ace Young (7th place)	Bucky Covington (8th place)
Mandisa (9th place)	Lisa Tucker (10th place)

== Show overview ==
The show featured a series of individual performances with each contestant performing a set of songs. Many also performed a duet with the next performer in the transition between the sets of songs. In the first half the contestants performed in random order, in the second half the last four performed in elimination order, starting with Chris Daughtry and ending with Taylor Hicks. The second half also featured a number of group songs, with a traditional group performance ending the show. Some changes were made in the earlier shows due to the absence of Katharine McPhee.

== Setlist ==
- Mandisa – "I'm Every Woman" (Chaka Khan), "If I Was Your Woman" (Alicia Keys)
- Mandisa and Ace Young – "I'm Your Angel" (R. Kelly & Celine Dion)
- Young – "Father Figure" (George Michael), "Harder to Breathe" (Maroon 5)
- Lisa Tucker – "Signed, Sealed, Delivered I'm Yours" (Stevie Wonder), "Your Song" (Elton John), "Someone Saved My Life Tonight" (Elton John)
- Tucker and Paris Bennett – "Waterfalls" (TLC)
- Bennett – "Midnight Train to Georgia" (Gladys Knight & the Pips), "Crazy in Love" (Beyoncé Knowles & Jay-Z)
- Bucky Covington – "Superstition" (Stevie Wonder), "Drift Away" (Dobie Gray)
- Covington and Kellie Pickler – "You're the One That I Want" (John Travolta & Olivia Newton-John)
- Pickler – "Walkin' After Midnight" (Patsy Cline)/Something To Talk About (Bonnie Raitt), "I'm the Only One" (Melissa Etheridge)

Intermission

- Chris Daughtry – "Whole Lotta Love" (Led Zeppelin), "Wanted Dead or Alive" (Bon Jovi), "Renegade" (Styx)
- Daughtry and Elliott Yamin – "Savin' Me" (Nickelback)
- Yamin – "Never Too Much" (Luther Vandross), "Trouble" (Elvis Presley), "Moody's Mood For Love" (James Moody)
- Covington, Young, Daughtry and Yamin – "Patience" (Guns N' Roses)
- Mandisa, Tucker, Pickler and Bennett – "Man! I Feel Like a Woman!" (Shania Twain), "I'm a Woman" (Peggy Lee)
- Katharine McPhee – "Black Horse and the Cherry Tree" (KT Tunstall), "Somewhere Over the Rainbow" (Judy Garland), and "Think" (Aretha Franklin)
- Taylor Hicks – "Jailhouse Rock" (Elvis Presley), "Hollywood Nights" (Bob Seger), "Sweet Soul Music" (Arthur Conley), "What's Going On" (Marvin Gaye), "Living for the City" (Stevie Wonder), "Don't Let Me Down" (The Beatles), "Do I Make You Proud" (Taylor Hicks), "Takin' It to the Streets" (The Doobie Brothers)
- Tucker, Mandisa, Covington, Young, Pickler, Bennett, Daughtry and Yamin – "We Are the Champions" (Queen)
- Top 10 – "Living in America" (James Brown)

== Additional notes ==
- Katharine McPhee joined the tour after her illness for the July 28 show in Washington, D.C. She did two solo numbers – "Black Horse and the Cherry Tree" and "Somewhere Over The Rainbow" and the group number "Living in America". She sang just two solo songs until San Diego when she added "Think".
- Kellie Pickler was sick for the first Atlanta show on August 3, 2006.
- Katharine McPhee performed in bare feet after she fractured her foot in Charlotte, North Carolina (not in slipper-sandals or gardening slippers that had widely been reported), and performed barefoot for the rest of the tour. She wore a cast on her left foot after the accident until August 22 in St. Paul, Minnesota.
- The girl's group songs "I'm A Woman", "Man! I Feel Like A Woman" were removed from the set list soon after Katharine's return.
- Taylor Hicks also removed "Sweet Soul Music", "What's Going On", and "Don't Let Me Down" from his song list.
- Taylor Hicks' band LiMBO also toured at the same time as the American Idol tour, following many stops of the American Idol tour. Taylor Hicks often performed at their 'after-party' shows, occasionally along with some of his fellow American Idol finalists.

== Tour dates ==
Date	City (All U.S.)	Venue	Attendance			Gross
Date	City (All U.S.)	Venue	Sales	Capacity	Percentage	Gross
July 5, 2006	Manchester	Verizon Wireless Arena	18,937	18,937	100%	$1,099,302
July 6, 2006	Manchester	Verizon Wireless Arena	18,937	18,937	100%	$1,099,302
July 7, 2006	Worcester	DCU Center	20,863	20,863	100%	$1,202,620
July 8, 2006	Worcester	DCU Center	20,863	20,863	100%	$1,202,620
July 9, 2006	Hartford	Hartford Civic Center	12,029	12,029	100%	$654,494
July 11, 2006	Albany	Pepsi Arena	11,716	11,716	100%	$594,356
July 12, 2006	Hershey	Giant Center	8,866	10,500	84%	$499,058
July 13, 2006	East Rutherford	Continental Airlines Arena	29,332	29,332	100%	$1,576,419
July 14, 2006	East Rutherford	Continental Airlines Arena	29,332	29,332	100%	$1,576,419
July 15, 2006	Uniondale	Nassau Coliseum	25,332	25,332	100%	$1,413,926
July 16, 2006	Uniondale	Nassau Coliseum	25,332	25,332	100%	$1,413,926
July 18, 2006	Wilkes-Barre	Wachovia Arena	7,732	7,732	100%	$460,112
July 19, 2006	Cleveland	Wolstein Center	10,127	10,127	100%	$554,523
July 21, 2006	Rochester	Blue Cross Arena	10,786	10,786	100%	$579,479
July 22, 2006	Philadelphia	Wachovia Center	14,839	15,499	96%	$791,159
July 23, 2006	Atlantic City	Boardwalk Hall	12,343	12,343	100%	$720,068
July 25, 2006	Bridgeport	Arena at Harbor Yard	8,125	8,125	100%	$516,109
July 27, 2006	Pittsburgh	Mellon Arena	11,750	12,359	95%	$593,595
July 28, 2006	Washington, D.C.	Verizon Center	14,180	14,484	98%	$763,248
July 29, 2006	Richmond	Richmond Coliseum	9,935	9,935	100%	$595,551
July 30, 2006	Greensboro	Greensboro Coliseum	15,337	15,337	100%	$773,655
August 1, 2006	Charlotte	Charlotte Bobcats Arena	12,556	14,190	89%	$632,566
August 2, 2006	Columbia	Colonial Center	11,373	12,079	94%	$615,051
August 3, 2006	Duluth	Arena at Gwinnett Center	10,156	10,529	97%	$587,466
August 5, 2006	Sunrise	BankAtlantic Center	12,950	13,284	98%	$729,962
August 6, 2006	Tampa	St. Pete Times Forum	13,989	14,322	98%	$728,473
August 8, 2006	Birmingham	BJCC Arena	13,041	13,334	98%	$694,363
August 10, 2006	Nashville	Gaylord Entertainment Center	12,889	14,345	90%	$675,515
August 11, 2006	Columbus	Value City Arena	12,641	13,299	95%	$657,118
August 12, 2006	Milwaukee	Bradley Center	11,746	13,151	89%	$631,857
August 13, 2006	St. Louis	Savvis Center	14,297	14,939	96%	$761,603
August 15, 2006	Grand Rapids	Van Andel Arena	11,413	11,663	98%	$619,256
August 16, 2006	Detroit	Joe Louis Arena	14,081	14,969	94%	$733,732
August 17, 2006	Indianapolis	Pepsi Coliseum	10,582	10,582	100%	$564,314
August 18, 2006	Louisville	Freedom Hall	14,056	14,056	100%	$580,980
August 19, 2006	Rosemont	Allstate Arena	13,390	13,697	98%	$745,107
August 20, 2006	Peoria	Carver Arena	8,536	9,825	87%	$476,008
August 22, 2006	Saint Paul	Xcel Energy Center	14,933	15,466	97%	$758,311
August 25, 2006	San Diego	iPayOne Center	10,624	11,176	95%	$582,441
August 26, 2006	Los Angeles	Staples Center	13,427	14,115	95%	$680,394
August 27, 2006	Anaheim	Arrowhead Pond of Anaheim	11,522	12,217	94%	$642,245
August 29, 2006	Sacramento	ARCO Arena	12,666	13,200	96%	$678,120
August 30, 2006	San Jose	HP Pavilion at San Jose	12,802	13,524	95%	$674,043
September 1, 2006	Portland	Rose Garden Arena	9,564		92%	$506,054
September 2, 2006	Tacoma	Tacoma Dome	12,804	14,424	89%	$686,214
September 5, 2006	Denver	Pepsi Center	10,891	13,024	84%	$561,170
September 7, 2006	Grand Prairie	Nokia Live	12,094	12,290	98%	$729,172
September 8, 2006	Grand Prairie	Nokia Live	12,094	12,290	98%	$729,172
September 9, 2006	Houston	Reliant Arena	7,088	10,845	98%	$431,949
September 10, 2006	Austin	Frank Erwin Center	8,679	10,845	80%	$447,256
September 12, 2006	Duluth	Arena at Gwinnett Center	10,605	10,945	97%	$598,353
September 14, 2006	Huntington	Big Sandy Superstore Arena	7,552	7,552	100%	$434,145
September 15, 2006	Norfolk	Constant Convocation Center	6,738			$377,389
September 16, 2006	Reading	Sovereign Center	6,987	7,240	97%	$408,589
September 17, 2006	Syracuse	War Memorial at Oncenter	6,048		94%	$357,758
September 19, 2006	Hershey	Giant Center	8,842	10,038	88%	$495,755
September 21, 2006	Portland	Cumberland County Civic Center	6,074	6,275	97%	$368,552
September 22, 2006	Providence	Dunkin' Donuts Center	9,717	9,992	97%	$555,038
September 23, 2006	Bridgeport	Arena at Harbor Yard	8,780	8,829	99.5%	$538,263
September 24, 2006	Wilkes-Barre	Wachovia Arena	8,188	8,519	96%	$479,558

== Response ==
The 2006 tour was a huge success, with an average attendance of 96.1% capacity, and 20 of its shows sold out. It ranked as the thirteenth biggest grossing tour of 2006 in the Billboard year end chart, with a gross of $35,291,883 that doubled the previous season's revenue, and 646,996 tickets sold as totalled from the 59 shows reported to Billboard. It is still the most successful Idol tour yet.

== Tour summary ==
- Number of shows – 60 (20 sold out)
- Total gross – $35,829,661 (60 shows)
- Total attendance – 656,550 (60 shows)
- Average attendance – 10,943 (96%)
- Average ticket price – $54.57
- Highest gross – Philadelphia, Pennsylvania – $791,159
- Lowest gross – Syracuse, New York – $357,758
- Highest attendance – Greensboro, North Carolina – 15,337 (100%)
- Lowest attendance – Syracuse, New York – 6,048 (94%)
