= Princess P =

Studio album by Paris Bennett
- Released: May 8, 2007
- Label: 306 Entertainment; TVT
- Producer: Eddie F; P. Jones; Tyrice Jones; Darren Lighty; J. Isaac Moore; Charles Roane

Paris Bennett chronology
Princess P (2007)	A Royal Christmas (2008)

Princess P is the debut album by American Idol contestant, Paris Bennett. It was released on May 8, 2007 through 306 Entertainment, owned by Paul Jones, her uncle, and TVT Records. Bennett worked with Jon Jon Traxx, Darren Lighty, and Rodney Jerkins on Princess P. The album name comes from the nickname used affectionately for her by Ryan Seacrest on American Idol. Bennett co-wrote the album with J. Isaac Moore.

== Critical reception ==
Professional ratings
Review scores
Source	Rating
AllMusic	2.5/5 stars
Entertainment Weekly	C+
USA Today	2.5/4 stars

Princess P garnered mixed reviews from music critics. A writer from AllMusic said that, "Like a lot of AmIdol artists, Bennett's music can seem light and fluffy, but it's that very quality that makes Princess P a pleasurable pop concoction." Adam B. Vary of Entertainment Weekly wrote about the album saying, "Fans of Kewpie-sweet Paris Bennett from American Idol's fifth season may never get over what they hear on Princess P, her debut CD. "Imma give it to you straight no chaser," she bellows on "I'm So Hot," the hardest – and least winning – of the album's hard-edged, surprisingly competent (but not catchy) club tracks. Other than the hook-soaked "Get Bizzy" (co-written by her mother, Jamecia), what gives these sub-Ciara songs their kick is Paris' full-throated delivery. The less said about her rap with Kevin "Chicken Little" Covais, meanwhile, the better." Elysa Gardner of USA Today noted how Bennett and her team of songwriters and producers tend to "cling to tried-and-true contemporary pop-R&B formulas." She concluded with, "Still, the album offers enough homespun charm to leave you rooting for the plucky upstart." In a dual review with Elliott Yamin's self-titled debut, Vibe writer Sean Fennessey criticized the overly upbeat and pop-centric material that misuses Bennett's vocals to the point of anonymity, concluding that "Unlike the goofily sincere Yamin, she never seems to be herself."

== Track listing ==
#	Title	Composers	Time
1.	"All Hail the Princess (Intro)"	Bennett, P./Jones, P./Moore, J. Isaac	01:23
2.	"Ordinary Love"	Bennett, P./Britt, Boo/Jones, P./Price, K./Moore, J. Isaac	03:28
3.	"Dreamin'"	Jones, P./Moore, J. Isaac	03:40
4.	"Daddy"	Jones, P./Moore, J. Isaac	03:27
5.	"Let Me Rap" (Feat. Kevin Covais)	Jones, P./Moore, J. Isaac	01:37
6.	"My Boyfriend's Back"	Feldman, Bob/Goldstein, Jerry/Gottehrer, Richard	03:02
7.	"Can't Control Myself"	Burks, E./Jones, P./Jones, T.	03:28
8.	"Duet"	Jones, P./Moore, J. Isaac	03:45
9.	"I'm So Hot (Interlude)"	Bennett, P./Hitchcock, C. III	00:23
10.	"I'm So Hot"	Bennett, P./Hitchcock, C. III	03:13
11.	"Get Bizzy"	Bennett, P./Calloway, R./Roane, C./Simmons, W.	03:23
12.	"Caught Up"	Jones, P./Jones, Tyrice	03:37
13.	"B-Bye"	Jones, P./Moore, J. Isaac	04:02
14.	"Burnt Up"	Jones, P./Moore, J. Isaac	03:56
15.	"I Will"	Jones, P./Moore, J. Isaac	03:48
16.	"Best Friends"	Bennett, J./Ferrell, E./Lighty, D./Wynn, J.	04:19
17.	"Dancin' (iTunes bonus track)"	Rodney Jerkins	04:00

== Charts ==
Chart (2007)	Peak position
US Billboard 200	133
US Heatseekers Albums (Billboard)	1
US Independent Albums (Billboard)	15
US Top R&B/Hip-Hop Albums (Billboard)	47

== Singles ==
"Ordinary Love"

Single by Paris Bennett

from the album Princess P
- Released: April 23, 2007
- Genre: Contemporary R&B
- Length: 3:17
- Songwriter(s): Keli Nicole Price, Jason Isaac Moore, Paris Bennett
- Producer(s): Jon Jon Traxx

Paris Bennett singles chronology
"Ordinary Love" (2007)	"I'm So Hot/TBA" (2007)

"Ordinary Love" is the debut single from Paris Bennett, the American Idol fifth place finalist (May 3, 2006) with production Jon Jon Traxx and J. Isaac.

"Ordinary Love" failed to make it onto any charts.

=== Music video ===
The video to Ordinary Love was filmed on January 12, in Minneapolis and directed by Danny Kimura with Dustin Breeding of boy band B5 as the leading man and features her friends from high school. The director said "I sense Paris is hungry for this, and she's going to go for it today."

The video begins with closeups of Bennett and Breeding, with shots of Bennett singing in a red room, driving in a car with her friends, talking on the phone and dancing with friends. Then Bennett discovers Breeding flirting with another girl, breaks up with him and the song changes to I'm So Hot, in which Bennett and dancers are shown dancing in a studio. The video was officially premiered on Yahoo! Music on April 23, 2007.
