= Lisa Tucker (singer) =

American singer (born 1989)

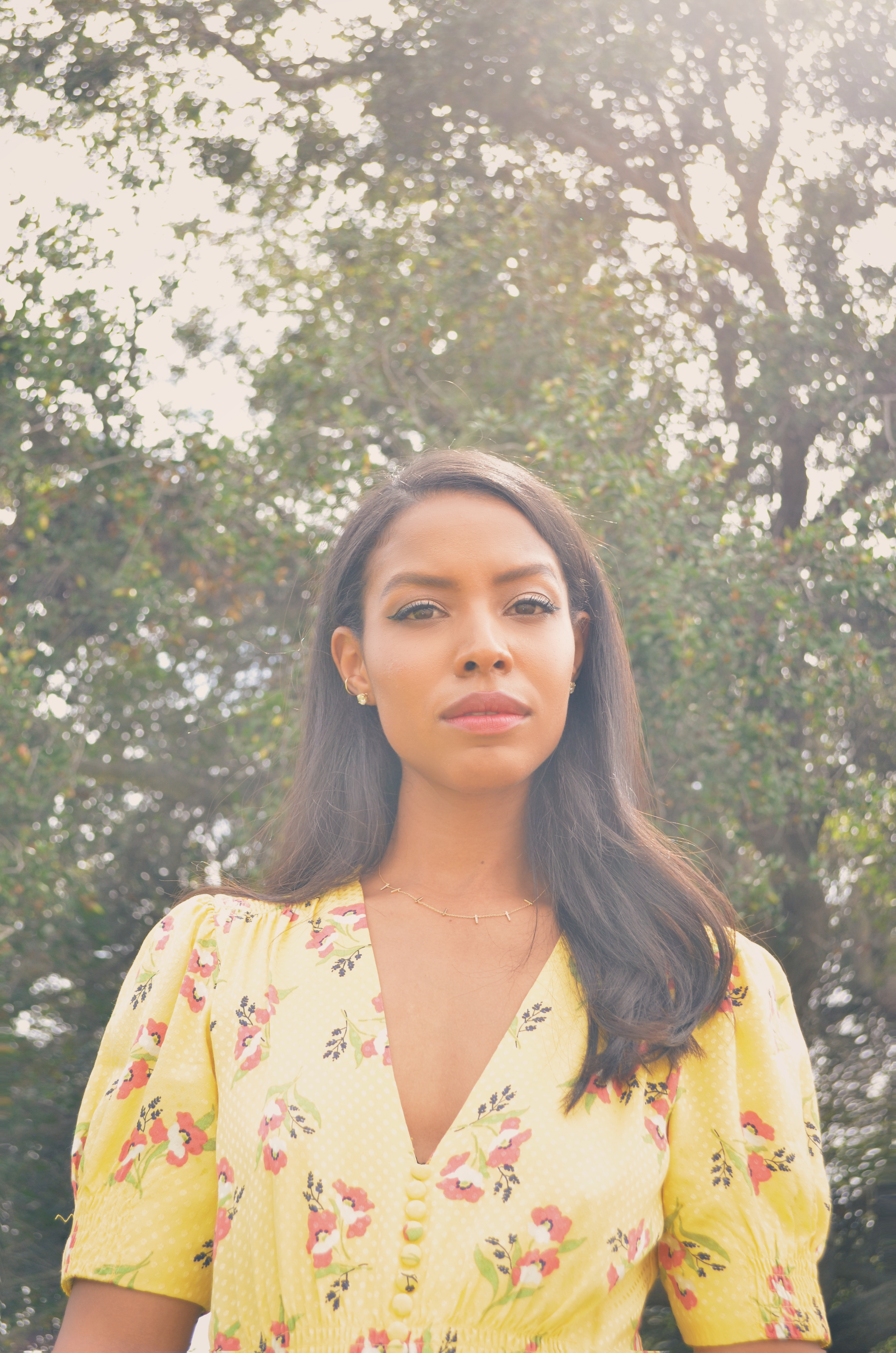
- Tucker in 2019

Background information
- Born: Lisa Gabrielle Tucker; June 13, 1989 (age 37); Anaheim, California, U.S.
- Genres: R&B, country, folk
- Occupations: Singer, actress
- Instruments: Piano, guitar, vocals
- Years active: 2003–present

Lisa Gabrielle Tucker (born June 13, 1989) is an American singer, musical theater actress, and television actress who was the tenth-place finalist on the fifth season of American Idol. After American Idol, she performed in the American Idols Live! Tour 2006 for three months and 60 concerts across the United States. After the tour, Tucker recorded a duet with Dionne Warwick on Warwick's album, My Friends & Me. She also appeared on The O.C. in a cameo as herself, and had recurring television roles on Zoey 101, The Game, and The Vampire Diaries. She began her theater career at the Orange County Children's Theater, and at 11, performed as Young Nala in a Pantages Theatre production of The Lion King musical.

== Life and career ==
=== Early life and career beginnings ===
Tucker was born and raised in Anaheim, California by her mother Eleanor, a customer service supervisor with Pacific Life, and her father Stan, an attorney. She began acting and singing during childhood, including performances with the Orange County Children's Theater and singing the national anthem at an Anaheim Angels baseball game. She began her theater career in a production of The Little Princess at age 9.

At age 11, Tucker played the role of young Nala for nine months in a Pantages Theatre production of The Lion King musical. Resident director of The Lion King, Frank Lombardi, wrote about Tucker: "Her talent is extraordinary. So much so that upon realizing her skills as a singer, one of our composers added a complex vocal arrangement to one of the original songs. Lisa sang with a simplicity and beauty that made it seem effortless, even though it actually took great skill and concentration."

When Tucker was 13, she was a finalist on Star Search and then released her first LP, Please Come Home for Christmas. She graduated high school in 2006, after attending La Palma, California's John F. Kennedy High School.

=== American Idol ===
At the age of 16, she auditioned for the fifth season of American Idol in Denver, Colorado with One Moment in Time by Whitney Houston where she amazed the judges, with Simon Cowell declaring, "Wow. I think the best 16-year-old we've ever had throughout this whole competition." Later, the judges made a unanimous decision to put her through to the season's final 24. America voted her through to the top 12. While she was on American Idol she attended high-school classes with former Idol finalists Paris Bennett and Kevin Covais. Tucker was eliminated on March 29, 2006, after being in the bottom 3 with Katharine McPhee and Ace Young. Tucker finished at tenth place on the show.

She then performed on the American Idols Live! Tour 2006 tour, performing "Someone Saved My Life Tonight" and "Your Song" by Elton John. A review by Michael Slezak in Entertainment Weekly described her performance as the "most surprising," based on the show, and said that she had "the night's strongest showing among the women, sitting down at the piano to offer a restrained, heartfelt rendition of Elton John’s "Your Song" — with no accompaniment from the band."

Week	Theme	Song Sung	Artist	Result
Top 24	12 Women	"I Am Changing"	Jennifer Holliday	Advanced
Top 20	10 Women	"Who's Lovin' You"	The Miracles	Advanced
Top 16	8 Women	"Here's Where I Stand"	Tiffany Taylor	Advanced
Top 12	Songs of Stevie Wonder	"Signed, Sealed, Delivered I'm Yours"	Stevie Wonder	Bottom 2
Top 11	'50s Hits	"Why Do Fools Fall In Love"	Frankie Lymon and the Teenagers	Bottom 3
Top 10	2000s Songs	"Because of You"	Kelly Clarkson	Eliminated

=== Post-Idol ===
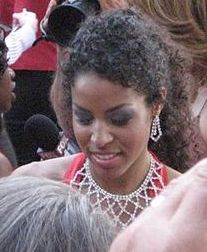
Tucker in May 2006.

Tucker has performed at numerous local events in Orange and Los Angeles counties including singing the national anthem at Lakers, Clippers, Angels, and Mighty Ducks games. She sang on the city of Anaheim float in the 118th Tournament of Roses parade. Tucker was invited to tour the U.S. Air Force bases in Europe to promote the kickoff of the annual USAFE Services Xtreme Summer Program.

She made a guest appearance on The O.C. playing herself in the prom episode. She was in the third and fourth seasons Zoey 101 as Lisa Perkins; her first appearance was in the episode "Michael Loves Lisa", which aired on January 7, 2007. In August 2007, Tucker was featured on the reality TV show "Dr. 90210" as the singing instructor for Dr. Rey's children. She was cast for the pilot of the FOX series Born in the USA, also by 19 Entertainment. She had a recurring role on The Game, where she played Pucci Wright in the third season. She also had a recurring role as Greta Martin in The Vampire Diaries.

Tucker sang "Then Came You" with Dionne Warwick on Warwick's new album, My Friends & Me.

Tucker performed as a special guest at Lord Rhaburn's Music Awards Show in Belize.

Tucker was formerly signed to recording artist Ne-Yo's production company Compound Entertainment and had a recording deal through Island Def Jam.

In July 2020, she released a country-folk ballad titled "Fickle."

== Discography ==
Year	Album	Label	Notes
2003	Rocket Baby: Shake, Rattle & Rhyme	Rocket Baby	"The Rainbow Waltz"
2003	Star Search - The Finalists	Sony	"I Have Nothing"
2003	Please Come Home for Christmas	OnePoint	Holiday album, released November 20
2006	American Idol Season 5: Encores	RCA	"Signed, Sealed, Delivered (I'm Yours)"
2006	My Friends & Me	Concord Records	"Then Came You" (with Dionne Warwick)

== Filmography ==
Year	Project	Role	Notes
2006	The O.C.	Herself	Cameo
2006	American Idol	Herself (top 10 contestant)	
2007–2008	Zoey 101	Lisa Perkins (recurring)	
2008	Zoey 101: Chasing Zoey	Lisa Perkins	
2009	90210	Student	
2009	The Game	Pucci	
2011	The Vampire Diaries	Greta Martin	3 episodes
