= College (2008 film) =

American comedy film

- Theatrical release poster
- Directed by: Deb Hagan
- Written by: Dan Callahan; Adam Ellison
- Produced by: Malcolm Petal: Julie Dangel
- Starring: Drake Bell; Kevin Covais; Andrew Caldwell; Haley Bennett; Ryan Pinkston
- Cinematography: Dan Stoloff
- Edited by: David Codron
- Music by: Transcenders
- Production company: Element Pictures
- Distributed by: Metro-Goldwyn-Mayer Pictures (through MGM Distribution Co.)
- Release date: August 29, 2008
- Running time: 94 minutes
- Country: United States
- Language: English
- Budget: $7 million
- Box office: $6.2 million

College is a 2008 American comedy film starring Drake Bell, Andrew Caldwell, and Kevin Covais and directed by first-time director Deb Hagan. The story follows three high school seniors, who spend the weekend visiting Fieldmont University for freshman orientation, and get involved in various antics.

It was released on August 29, 2008, by Metro-Goldwyn-Mayer Pictures through MGM Distribution Co.. The film was universally panned by critics and grossed $6 million worldwide against its $7 million budget.

== Plot ==
After Kevin, a high school senior, is dumped by his girlfriend Gina for being too boring, he does not want to go to the freshman orientation weekend at Fieldmont University, which they had planned to attend together. However, Kevin's best friends Carter and Morris convince him that the weekend away will help get his mind off her, having been told by their friend Fletcher about a weekend visiting his brother at college in which he got laid by three college chicks at once despite learning the cons of his stay. This convinces Kevin to go to Fieldmont for the freshmen orientation to prove to his ex-girlfriend that he can be fun instead of boring.

Once they are there, instead of residing in a college dormitory with a roommate carrying a massive fetish for animal porn, the rowdiest fraternity on campus currently on probation, a place where Carter's cousin was a brother at, pretends to recruit them as pledges in return for granting them access to the college party scene. Though forced to put up with the disgusting antics of fraternity brothers Teague, Bearcat, and Cooper, the guys meet sorority girls Kendall, Heather, and Amy, and sparks fly. But once Teague feels threatened by Kevin's new relationship with Kendall, who once dated Teague, he takes the pre-frosh humiliation to a greater level and make their lives miserable and start bullying them out of their college. They even steal their parents credit cards and max them out, while hiring Verne Troyer to make an appearance.

Morris winds up getting drunk to the point where he encounters Dean Chandler on the road and puke on his car windshield, potentially causing his scholarship to diminish. Knowing it was their parents money that funded the frat party, Kevin and Carter demanded some booze, but were further humiliated when Teague revealed the 3 boys to be high school students. The fraternity then kidnapped the boys and took them to a secluded farm where they tied them up and left them with the farm animals. The guys manage to escape and there's a rift between the trio as they go their separate ways. They later decide to fight back and get payback for ruining their weekend as well as any chance of attending Fieldmont.

During the climax, Teague is not only in trouble with the cops, but his car is vandalized, Bearcat is superglued to a toilet, and Cooper is duct taped to a statue naked. Kevin later made amends Kendall. After Kevin sent Gina a video of him having fun at a party at Fieldmont, she asks him to get back together with her, but he refuses. Kevin tells his friends about a new college weekend they can visit; Morris is being punished by his parents for messing up his college scholarship, but he says he can sneak out. All three of them decide to go.

== Cast ==
- Drake Bell as Kevin Brewer
- Kevin Covais as Morris Hooper
- Andrew Caldwell as Carter Scott
- Haley Bennett as Kendall Hartley
- Nick Zano as Teague
- Gary Owen as Brian 'Bearcat' Miller
- Zach Cregger as Cooper Montague
- Camille Mana as Heather Gellar
- Nathalie Walker as Amy Steward
- Alona Tal as Gina Hedlund
- Ryan Pinkston as Fletcher
- Reggie Martinez as Goose
- Verne Troyer as himself
- Valentina Vaughn as herself (Penthouse Pet)
- Heather Vandeven as herself (Penthouse Pet)
- Andree Moss as Ashley
- Carolyn Moss as Riley
- Wallace Merck as Dean Chandler
- Wendy Talley as Kevin's Mom
- Brandi Coleman as College Girl #1
- Jessica Heap as College Girl #2
- Todd Voltz as Nitrous Guy
- Melissa Lingafelt as Junior Girl
- Brandy Blake as Girl #1
- Ava Santana as Girl #2
- Stephanie Honore as Gina’s Friend
- Josh Tenk as himself
- Tracy Mulholland as Mean Sorority Sister

== Production ==
Many of the scenes of the actors at university are filmed on the campus of Tulane University in New Orleans and Grace King High School in Metairie in January 2007.

== Release ==
=== Reception ===
On the review aggregator website Rotten Tomatoes, 5% of 42 critics' reviews are positive, with an average rating of 2.7/10. The website's consensus reads: "A pale imitation of the raunchy frat comedies of old, College aims low and misses." Metacritic, which uses a weighted average, assigned the film a score of 15 out of 100, based on 11 critics, indicating "overwhelming dislike".

Gary Goldstein of the Los Angeles Times criticized the "grab-bag script" for emphasizing vulgar humor and bad taste over "wit, charm and originality", calling it "a tedious, by-the-numbers raunch-fest that exists strictly because it can."

Marc Savlov of The Austin Chronicle found the film "so persistently loud and annoying that it single-handedly makes the case for drugging yourself with a roofie, Nembutal, and GHB cocktail (add bitters to taste) prior to entering the theatre."

Entertainment Weekly's Owen Gleiberman rated the movie with a "C−" grade, saying "Friendly yet toothless, College musters little energy even as anarchic-party-movie nostalgia."

Nathan Rabin of The A.V. Club gave it a "D−" rating, saying "[I]t's a joyless misfire determined to deliver the time-tested staples of the college comedy in the most perfunctory, least satisfying manner imaginable."

=== Box office ===
The film was released on August 29, 2008, in 2,123 theaters. It made US$2.6 million over the Labor Day weekend. The film has grossed an estimated $4.7 million in the U.S. and Canada and $1.6 million in other territories for a total gross of $6.3 million worldwide.

=== Home media ===
The film was released on DVD on January 27, 2009. The DVD includes both the Theatrical and Unrated versions of the film as well as a Gag Reel.
