= Addicted (Ace Young song) =

Single by Ace Young

from the album Ace Young
- Released: April 15, 2008
- Genre: Pop rock
- Length: 3:47
- Songwriter(s): Desmond Child, Andreas Carlsson, Kalle Engström, Ace Young
- Producer(s): Desmond Child

Ace Young singles chronology
"Scattered" (2006)	"Addicted" (2008)

"Addicted" is Ace Young's second single, after his 2006 song "Scattered". "Addicted" is the first and only single from his self-titled 2008 CD. The song was written by Desmond Child and Andreas Carlsson, who was part of the team who wrote for the Backstreet Boys. It was produced by Desmond Child.

The song features a guitar solo by former Marilyn Manson guitarist John 5.

== Reception ==
In reviewing the single, Chuck Taylor of Billboard described it as a "TNT-ignited, full-on pop opus, so plump with production elements that Phil Spector would wink." In contrast, Mike Daniel of The Dallas Morning News called it "a thunky rock-funk roll with a harsh, ill-fitting guitar solo."

The single became Young's first charting single on the Billboard Pop 100, where it peaked at number 77.

== Music video ==
The music video, directed by University of Southern California student Spencer Cohen, debuted exclusively online. Dancer Staci Flood plays the object of Young's affection. It was shot at a Burbank, California soundstage and at a mansion in Orange County.

The music video follows Ace and his girlfriend and how he is addicted to her. Clips of him and his band playing are intertwined into these scenes. At the beginning we see him and his girlfriend on the bed, just staring at each other (seemingly just after having sex). Quickly he pulls her out of the bed, gives her a sheet to cover herself and pushes her out the door. She stands there as he walks to the bathroom, and he has memories of them having sex. He walks passed the bath tub but no one is in there, but he looks in the mirror and sees the bath tub in reflection and his girlfriend is in there bathing. He leaves the bathroom and walks down the hall still having the memories, but suddenly his girlfriend thrusts him onto the wall and lifts his shirt and licks his stomach and chest. She puts his hand in his pants but he quickly walks away. Then on the stairs he sees a red bra and high heeled shoes. He walks into his bedroom where he sees his girlfriend. Suddenly she pushes him onto the bed and they begin having sex. Then suddenly they stop. We then see the same events in the beginning of the video, as he pushes her out the door (showing he is addicted to her). As an ending scene, his girlfriend comes and takes his hand, and leans in to kiss him. In this version his girlfriend is played by Elizabeth Hendrickson best known as Chloe Mitchell on The Young and the Restless and Maggie Stone on All My Children.

TNA wrestlers Jay Lethal and SoCal Val star in another version of the video. This video was made for the couple for their wedding and had both clips made for the video and clips of Lethal from Impact.
