= The Recombination Hypothesis =

- The Big Bang Theory episode
- Episode no.: Season 5 Episode 13
- Directed by: Mark Cendrowski
- Story by: Chuck Lorre
- Teleplay by: Bill Prady; Steven Molaro
- Production code: 3X6863
- Original air date: January 19, 2012
- Running time: 22 minutes

Guest appearance
- Jim Turner as Reverend White

Episode chronology
← Previous "The Shiny Trinket Maneuver"	Next → "The Beta Test Initiation"
- The Big Bang Theory season 5

"The Recombination Hypothesis" is the 13th episode of the fifth season, as well as the 100th episode overall, of the American television sitcom The Big Bang Theory. It premiered on CBS in the United States on January 19, 2012. In this episode, Leonard impulsively asks Penny out for dinner on a date.

The story and concept of the episode was written by series co-creator Chuck Lorre. The teleplay was written by co-creator Bill Prady and writer Steven Molaro. It was directed by Mark Cendrowski. The episode received generally positive reviews from television critics, who praised Leonard and Penny's attempt to rework their relationship. Upon airing, "The Recombination Hypothesis" garnered 15.71 million viewers in the United States and 5.3 rating in the 18–49 demographic, according to Nielsen ratings.

== Plot ==
The episode begins with Sheldon receiving a cardboard cut-out of Spock he ordered, however is dismayed to find it is not the Spock played by Leonard Nimoy but rather Zachary Quinto. While Sheldon complains, Leonard sees Penny and they exchange smiles. Leonard walks over asking if she has plans for dinner. Penny looks surprised about being asked out and accepts. As Penny nervously tries on clothes with Amy and Bernadette, Bernadette assures her everything will work out, since Leonard is crazy about her. While playing Settlers of Catan, Sheldon, Howard and Raj ask Leonard why he is putting himself through another relationship with Penny, as they had broken up two years ago when things got too serious for her.

During dinner, Leonard and Penny find their first date in two years awkward, and decide to act they are on a real first date. They tell each other about their work and Penny is amused when Leonard boasts that he built a Bat-Signal and calls himself "King of Nerds". Leonard then asks Penny if they are going to get back together. A shocked Penny confesses she will always have feelings for him and that he always overthinks everything. Leonard is offended and returns home dejected.

Later, Leonard is asleep and awakened by a text from Penny who meets him in the hallway, kisses him, takes him into her apartment and tells him to be quiet. Leonard wonders how a bad date ended in sex. Penny thought things were great until he asked if they were getting back together. Leonard suggests that they try being together and not tell their friends until they know it is working, treating their relationship like a new version of software, a "Penny and Leonard 2.0".

At The Cheesecake Factory, the group discuss how the date did not work out. Leonard sits down and starts an argument with Penny by insulting her. Later that night, Penny demands to know why Leonard was a jerk at work since they had agreed to be friends, not fight. Leonard heads toward her apartment because their new relationship is about sex after fighting. Later, Leonard asks Penny what exactly they are doing since every relationship scenario he plays out ends badly. When Penny reminds him that he overthinks everything, Leonard finds himself back in the hallway, having been daydreaming while with Sheldon complaining about the Spock cardboard cut-out. Despite the fact it seems the relationship will once again end badly, Leonard decides to ask Penny out. Penny asks whether he has thought things through. Leonard replies that he has and still thinks they should go ahead with it. Penny agrees and then smiles.

In Penny's bedroom, she is again choosing an outfit for her date. Daydreaming, she sees herself heavily pregnant during a wedding ceremony with Leonard. She snaps out of the daydream and decides to go to the drugstore before the date.

== Production ==
"The Recombination Hypothesis" is the first episode of a two episode arc featuring Leonard and Penny attempting to restart their relationship that has been one of the major plot lines and driving forces of the series. The arc concludes with the next episode "The Beta Test Initiation" where Penny and Leonard return from their date. The first scene is a salute to the original pilot where Leonard and Sheldon climb the stairs wearing similar outfits and they spot Penny through her apartment door wearing the same shirt from the pilot. Sheldon is disappointed to discover that a Mr. Spock cardboard stand-up he ordered is a portrayal of Zachary Quinto's Spock, not Leonard Nimoy's Spock. According to Bill Prady, co-creator of The Big Bang Theory, approval from Paramount, J. J. Abrams (producer of the new Star Trek series) and Zachary Quinto was required in order to mock Spock. Also, this is the first time that an entire episode is a "dream-sequence", a unique style of storytelling, and is the second Chuck Lorre show to achieve the "dream-sequence" story, after Two and a Half Men in the episode "Frodo's Headshots".

== Reception ==
=== Ratings ===
"The Recombination Hypothesis" was originally broadcast on January 19, 2012 in the United States between 8:00 p.m. and 8:30 p.m. Upon airing, "The Recombination Hypothesis" garnered 15.71 million viewers with the best ever ratings in the adults 25-54, adults 18-49 and adults 18-34 categories.

=== Critical reception ===
"The Recombination Hypothesis'" received generally positive reviews from television commentators. R.L Shaffer of IGN gave the episode a "really good" review. The reviewer says the episode "knocked it out of the park" even though it started like "another attempt to tease the anxiety of the Penny/Leonard relationship" the final twist did show some growth in Leonard’s character that he must not over-think their relationship. Carla Day of TV Fanatic gave a positive review. Day noted that revisiting Leonard and Penny on the 100th episode was the best way to honor the history of the series. Though she was happy to see "Peonard or Lenny" back together, she felt that the other guys had the best lines with the "wood" jokes. Overall she found the show "brought us back to the origins of the comedy and what made us fall in love with these nerds and their gorgeous neighbor." The Editor Rating was 4.7 out of 5.0.
