= Becky and Jessie O'Donohue =

American twin athletes, models (born 1980)

- Born: Rebecca Marie O'Donohue; Jessica Elleanore O'Donohue; July 13, 1980 (age 46); Dobbs Ferry, New York, United States
- Modeling information
- Height: 5 ft 8 in (1.73 m)
- Hair color: Brown
- Eye color: Blue-Green
- Basketball career

Career information
- High school: Dobbs Ferry (Dobbs Ferry, New York)
- College: Niagara (1998–2002)
- Position: Forward

Rebecca Marie "Becky" O'Donohue and Jessica Elleanore "Jessie" O'Donohue (born July 13, 1980) are American reality TV show contestants, models, former actresses and former basketball players. The identical twins played college basketball at Niagara University before starting a career in entertainment and modeling. In 2006, Becky was a semi-finalist in the fifth season of American Idol.

== Life and career ==
=== Early life and basketball careers ===
Becky and Jessie are from Dobbs Ferry, New York, from a family of Irish and Greek descent. They attended Dobbs Ferry High School where they excelled at basketball, with Jessie becoming the first woman in school history to have 1,000 career points and Becky the first to garner 1,000 career rebounds. Following their high school career, both sisters played four years for the Niagara Purple Eagles basketball team at Niagara University. At Niagara, Becky was a member of the Student Athletic Advisory Committee.

==== College statistics ====
Legend
GP	Games played	GS	Games started	MPG	Minutes per game
FG%	Field goal percentage	3P%	3-point field goal percentage	FT%	Free throw percentage
RPG	Rebounds per game	APG	Assists per game	SPG	Steals per game
BPG	Blocks per game	PPG	Points per game	**Bold**	Career high

Becky
Year	Team	GP	Points	FG%	3P%	FT%	RPG	APG	SPG	BPG	PPG
1998–99	Niagara	28	159	38.5%	0.0%	73.5%	4.1	1.6	0.8	0.4	5.7
1999–00	Niagara	28	121	**42.3%**	**50.0%**	55.6%	3.3	1.1	1.1	0.0	4.3
2000–01	Niagara	28	**212**	38.4%	0.0%	74.6%	**4.5**	**2.1**	**1.3**	**0.4**	**7.6**
2001–02	Niagara	28	165	41.8%	0.0%	**82.5%**	2.5	1.3	0.7	0.3	5.9
Career		112	657	39.9%	20.0%	74.2%	3.6	1.5	1.0	0.3	5.9

Jessie
Year	Team	GP	Points	FG%	3P%	FT%	RPG	APG	SPG	BPG	PPG
1998–99	Niagara	27	133	30.2%	21.7%	69.8%	3.2	0.9	0.4	0.3	4.9
1999–00	Niagara	28	142	38.1%	27.3%	75.0%	3.6	0.8	0.8	0.3	5.1
2000–01	Niagara	28	222	35.7%	32.1%	79.7%	3.9	1.7	**1.2**	0.4	7.9
2001–02	Niagara	28	**256**	**40.1%**	**38.0%**	**84.6%**	**4.4**	**1.8**	1.0	**0.5**	**9.1**
Career		111	753	36.4%	31.5%	77.5%	3.8	1.3	0.9	0.4	6.8

=== Entertainment career ===
Becky's original audition on American Idol was in Boston where she was supported by Jessie (who did not sing due to recent throat surgery). Judge Simon Cowell praised her looks, but said no to her voice. However, she was let through to Hollywood by co-judges Randy Jackson and Paula Abdul. O'Donohue made it through to the final twenty-four contestants in the semi-finals, but was the first female to be eliminated from the show when she received the fewest votes on February 23's results show. They briefly appeared on the American Idol season finale on May 24, 2006, via satellite from Birmingham, Alabama, as commentators during Taylor Hicks' cheering rally.

Both appeared in a special "Twins" episode on Fear Factor where they were eliminated on the first stunt. The twins also appeared together in Maxim magazine in 2004. They played twin sisters Darla and Donna in the 2007 comedy film I Now Pronounce You Chuck and Larry and Layna and Sophia on an episode of ER.

Jessie appeared as a stripper named Karamel Owens in an 8th season episode of CSI: Miami titled "Dude, Where's My Groom?", while Becky played a stripper also named Karamel on the House, MD 5th season episode "House Divided."

The twins appeared on the "Sister Act" episode of Minute to Win It, on which they won with $50,000. Becky guest starred in the July 2010 Psych episode "Not Even Close... Encounters", and as Siri in the January 2012 The Big Bang Theory episode "The Beta Test Initiation". They also appear on the infomercial for WEN hair products with red hair. They appeared in Mardi Gras: Spring Break in 2011.

Jessie's last role was in a 2013 unsold pilot, Lying for a Living. Becky's last role was as the voice of a GPS, in a 2020 episode of Mom.
