= The Beta Test Initiation =

- The Big Bang Theory episode
- Episode no.: Season 5 Episode 14
- Directed by: Mark Cendrowski
- Story by: Chuck Lorre; Steven Molaro; Eric Kaplan
- Teleplay by: Bill Prady; Dave Goetsch; Maria Ferrari
- Production code: 3X6864
- Original air date: January 26, 2012
- Running time: 22 minutes

Guest appearances
- John Ross Bowie as Barry Kripke; Becky O'Donohue as Siri

Episode chronology
← Previous "The Recombination Hypothesis"	Next → "The Friendship Contraction"
- The Big Bang Theory season 5

"The Beta Test Initiation" is the fourteenth episode of the fifth season of the sitcom The Big Bang Theory. The episode premiered on January 26, 2012 on CBS.

The episode received generally positive reviews from television critics, who praised its humor and considered it to be one of the show's better episodes.

== Production ==
The story and concept were created by series co-creator Chuck Lorre and writers Steven Molaro and Eric Kaplan. The teleplay was written by co-creator Bill Prady, and writers Dave Goetsch and Maria Ferrari, and was directed by Mark Cendrowski.

== Plot ==
Leonard and Penny have resumed dating, but agree to take things slow and treat their relationship like a "beta test". Both agree to report and fix their problems with the "software" objectively rather than get angry at one another. Leonard gives Penny a "bug report" on her problems, but goes overboard, listing endless faults, which angers her. In return, she also writes her own "bug report" where she insults his own habits. Realizing his mistake, Leonard contacts Penny's father to learn about her childhood hobbies and arranges their next date at a firing range. The date goes well until Leonard accidentally shoots himself in the toe. Escorting Leonard home from the hospital with only a minor bruise on his toe, Penny assures him that their relationship is progressing smoothly.

Meanwhile, Raj buys a new iPhone 4S which Howard Wolowitz helps him unwrap. Raj falls in love with the iPhone's virtual assistant, Siri, which freaks out and bothers Howard and Bernadette. Raj later experiences a dream where he meets Siri as a beautiful woman but finds he cannot speak to her due to his selective mutism.

== Reception ==
=== Ratings ===
"The Beta Test Initiation" was originally broadcast on January 26, 2012, in the United States between 8:00 p.m. and 8:30 p.m. It gained 16.13 million viewers. In the United States it earned a rating of 5.4 in the 18–49 demographic.

=== Critical reception ===
The episode received positive reviews from commentators. Kristen Elizabeth of TV Equals noted the "episode was a great example of how The Big Bang Theory works best as an ensemble." She enjoyed Raj's dinner party and the manner in which his "creepy" behavior disturbed Howard and Bernadette. R. L. Shaffer of IGN found that the episode "felt a lot more along the lines of the first two seasons" since the fans got "to watch our nerds do what they do best – nerd out". R.L. Shaffer liked Sheldon's "Fun with Flags" series, calling it "one of the season's funnier gags." He enjoyed the approach to Penny and Leonard's date, though he would have liked to see Penny fire off a few rounds at the shooting range in order to see Leonard feel emasculated. Carla Day of TV Fanatic wrote that "this episode was a winner because all three storylines were full of laughs" and was delighted that Penny and Leonard were back together and that the show is funnier due to their relationship. Day found that Amy made a good sidekick for Sheldon during the flag telecast, especially as the pretzel, though "Raj and Siri provided the best laughs".
