= Kevin Covais =

American actor and singer

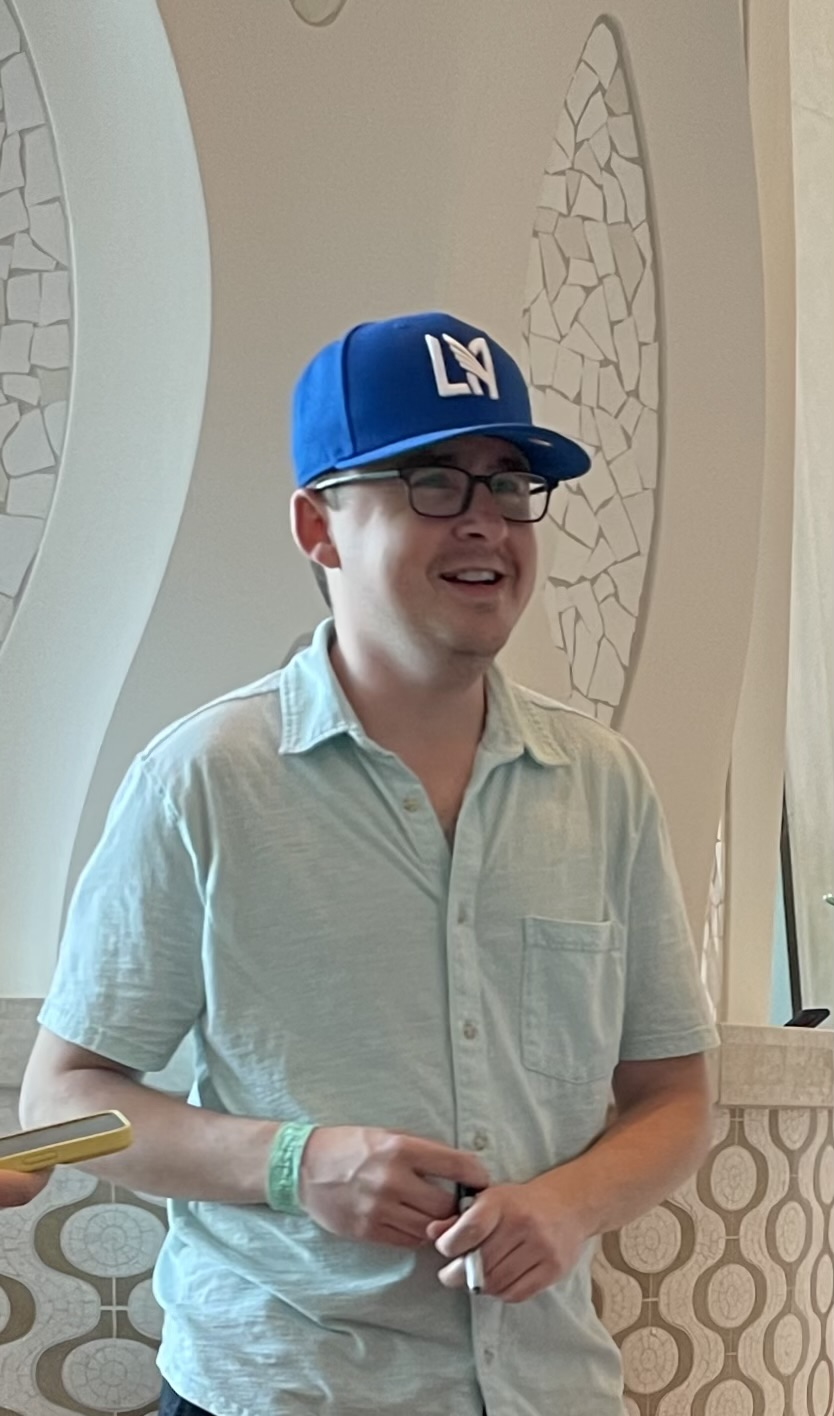
- Kevin Covais at Disney's Coronado Springs Resort, 2022
- Born: Kevin Patrick Covais; May 30, 1989 (age 37); Levittown, New York, U.S.
- Occupations: Actor; Singer; Songwriter
- Years active: 2005–present
- Musical career
- Genres: Blue-eyed soul
- Instruments: Vocals; guitar

Kevin Patrick Covais (/koʊˈveɪɪs/ koh-VAY-iss; born May 30, 1989) is an American actor, singer and songwriter. He was a finalist on the fifth season of American Idol. Covais appeared in the films College and Transformers: Age of Extinction, and television shows Good Luck Charlie and State of Georgia.

== Early life ==
Covais was born on May 30, 1989, and raised in Levittown, New York, on Long Island. He is the son of John Covais, a retired Sheriff's Correction Officer, and Patty Covais. He is the youngest of three. He has two siblings, a sister (Kathleen) and a brother (John). Covais was diagnosed with type 1 diabetes at age eleven and receives insulin injections, like his fellow contestant, Elliott Yamin.

Covais started singing at the age of ten and has taken voice lessons for four years. Covais has stated that Brian McKnight and American Idol first season winner Kelly Clarkson are favorite singers of his. In the future, he plans to pursue a career in singing, acting or journalism.

Covais was a junior at Island Trees High School during his Idol run; he graduated at the end of the 2006–07 school year. He is a former student of Island Trees Middle School. He is a member of the Drama Club and has played the lead in several school plays including Brighton Beach Memoirs, Godspell and Guys and Dolls; he is also a member of the Metropolitan Youth Chorale and the National Honor Society. In the 2005–06 school year, he won the lead in the school's musical, Anything Goes but had to leave for American Idol. He also won some competitions outside of school, such as Eisenhower Park's Reach for the Stars in 2003. He is also a fan of the New York Yankees, the New York Knicks and the New York Jets.

== Career ==
=== 2006–07: American Idol ===
Covais auditioned in Boston, Massachusetts. On March 9, 2006, he made it into the top 12 of American Idol. Covais has sarcastically dubbed himself the show's "sex symbol," while fellow finalist Paris Bennett called him "Chicken Little" for his supposed resemblance to the character in the Disney movie. Covais was eliminated on March 22, 2006. He was in the bottom three with Bucky Covington and Lisa Tucker.

Covais continued to pursue his singing career after his stint on Idol. He made a number of media appearances including Jimmy Kimmel Live! on March 24, 2006, Live with Regis and Kelly on March 29 and July 4, The Today Show on March 30 and The Ellen DeGeneres Show on April 4. Covais also intends to return to television, telling TV Guide's Shawna Malcolm, "You'll see me on TV again. If Disney comes calling...." In December 2006, he performed at a Disney World holiday concert. Covais rapped on one track of good friend and fellow Idol finalist Paris Bennett's debut CD, Princess P. He also recorded "When I Fall in Love" for the compilation CD American Idol Season 5: Encores, which features a song from each of the 12 finalists.

==== American Idol performances ====
Semifinals

- February 22, 2006 – "One Last Cry" by Brian McKnight
- March 1, 2006 – "I Heard It Through the Grapevine" by Marvin Gaye (Bottom 3)
- March 8, 2006 – "Vincent (Starry, Starry Night)" by Don McLean
  - Jackson and Abdul were complimentary. Cowell was not, saying only 90-year-olds would enjoy it.

Finals

- March 14, 2006 – "Part Time Lover" by Stevie Wonder
  - Jackson and Abdul liked that Covais had fun. Cowell thought it was "appalling."
- March 21, 2006 – "When I Fall in Love" by Doris Day (Eliminated)
  - The judges were complimentary. Cowell said Covais's fanbase would eat it up.

Season finale

- May 24, 2006 – "What's New Pussycat?" by Tom Jones
  - This was performed during the Burt Bacharach medley performed by the top 12 finalists at the finale.

=== 2008–present: Acting ===
Covais had a co-starring role in the 2008 comedy film College as Morris. Covais landed a role in Labor Pains. He returned to New York on March 30. Nassau County Executive Tom Suozzi presented him with a key to the city, and declared that day "Kevin Covais Day". He has not been signed to a recording contract as of 2006. Covais is a youth ambassador for the American Diabetes Association educating young people about diabetes. A cartoon version of Covais has appeared in the manga webcomic Sorethumbs, due to his striking resemblance to one of the main characters (Fairbanks). Covais made a guest appearance at Nassau County's Italian American Night at the Lakeside Theatre on June 26, 2006, in Eisenhower Park. Also, he returned to Island Trees High School on April 3, 2009, to sing at the annual Island Trees Music Department Concert to raise money for the music department.

Covais appeared on an episode of The Real World aftershow along with Ace Young and Lisa Tucker on February 18, 2010. From 2012 until the show's series finale in 2014, Covais held a recurring role on Good Luck Charlie as Victor DeLeseur.

Covais starred as an ice cream employee in the second-season episode "The Wedding" of This is Us in 2018.

== Filmography ==
Films
Year	Title	Role
2008	College	Morris Hooper
2009	Labor Pains	Greg
2011	Division III: Football's Finest	Allen Schwartz
2012	Touchback	Todd White
2012	Men in Black 3	MIB Agent #5
2013	Identity Thief	Kevin
2014	Transformers: Age of Extinction	Dorky Driver

Television
Year	Title	Role	Episode
2006	American Idol	Contestant	Season 5
2009	Ghost Whisperer	PA	Episode: "Stage Fright"
2011	State of Georgia	Lewis	Main role
2012–14	Good Luck Charlie	Victor DeLeseur	Recurring role (Season 3–4)
2013	Raising Hope	Simon	Episode: "Burt Mitzvah: The Musical"
2014	Mom and Dad Undergrads	Will (Rock Man)	Television film
2018	This Is Us	Ice cream employee	Episode: "The Wedding"
2019	The Rookie	Stanley (Flare gun threat)	Episode: "Redwood"
