= Ace Young (album) =

Studio album by Ace Young
- Released: July 15, 2008
- Recorded: October 2007–March 2008 in Los Angeles
- Genre: Pop
- Length: 42:38
- Label: Pazzo

Singles from Ace Young
- 1. "Addicted" Released: April 15, 2008

Professional ratings
Review scores
Source	Rating
Allmusic	2.5/5 stars

Ace Young is the self-titled debut album from American Idol 5 contestant Ace Young. The album was released in July 2008 and sold 10,000 copies. The album features Young's single, "Addicted", which landed on number 77 on Billboard's Hot 100 chart.

== Track listing ==
1. "Addicted" (Andreas Carlsson, Desmond Child, Kalle Engström, Ace Young) – 3:41
2. "The Letter" (Carlsson, Engström, Young) – 3:33
3. "A Hard Hand to Hold" (Child, Gary Go) – 3:17
4. "You Redeem Me" (Diane Warren) – 3:54
5. "Where Will You Go" (Ness Bautista, Child) – 3:20
6. "Fast Life" (Julian Bunetta, Sam Horbund, Young) – 3:35
7. "Young Money" (Bunetta, Young) – 3:47
8. "How You Gonna Spend Your Life" (Darrell Brown, Child, Kees Dieffenthaller) – 3:47
9. "The Girl That Got Away" (Carlsson, Child, Engström, Young) – 3:25
10. "Dirty Mind" (Carlsson, Child, Young) – 3:21
11. "The Gift" (Child, Engström, Young) – 3:41
12. "Addicted" (Acoustic) (Hidden) 2:28

== Personnel ==
- Maxwell Abrams – tenor sax
- David Angell – violin
- Chris Baseford – engineer
- Ness Bautista – backing vocals, producer
- Eric Bazilian – guitar, engineer
- Pat Bergeson – harmonica
- Bluu Suede – backing vocals
- Drew Bollman – assistant engineer
- Richard Bravo – percussion, engineer
- Julian Bunetta – producer, engineer, mixing
- Chuck Butler – acoustic guitar, bass, electric guitar, programming
- David Paul Campbell – conductor, string arrangements
- Randy Cantor – engineer
- Andreas Carlsson – producer
- Kirsten Cassell – celli
- Will Champlin – backing vocals
- Desmond Child – producer, executive producer
- Brian Coleman – production coordination
- Greg Collins – mixing
- Steve Crowder – assistant engineer
- David Davidson – violin
- Donald Clive Davidson – violin
- Sarah Deane – production assistant
- Connie Ellisor – violin
- Kalle Engstrom – keyboards, programming, producer, engineer, mixing
- Marcus Finnie – drums
- Ben Fowler – engineer
- Gary Go – keyboards, programming, backing vocals, producer, engineer
- Jules Gondar – engineer
- Carl Gorodetzky – violin, contractor
- Ali Helnwein – production coordination
- Robert Ikiz – percussion
- John 5 – guitar
- Chris Kent – bass
- Mika Lett – backing vocals
- Lee Levin – drums, engineer
- Thomas Lindberg – bass
- Craig Lozowick – engineer
- Gregg Mangiafico – keyboards, string arrangements, string conductor
- Dan Muckala – piano, producer, engineer
- Justin Neibank – string engineer
- John Netti – assistant engineer
- Justin Niebank – engineer
- Jason Paige – backing vocals
- Carole Rabinowitz-Neuen – cello
- Lowell Reynolds – assistant engineer
- Leslie Richter – assistant engineer
- Jay Ruston – engineer
- Pamela Sixfin – violin
- Mark Smidt – horn
- Harry "Slick" Sommerdahl – keyboards
- Shane Swayney – guitar, programming, engineer
- Will C. Thompson – assistant engineer
- Alan Umstead – violin
- Catherine Umstead – violin
- Mario Valdes – assistant engineer
- Gary VanOsdale – viola
- Mary Kathryn Vanosdale – violin
- Jon Vella – guitar, programming, producer, engineer
- Dan Warner – guitar, engineer
- Kris Wilkinson – viola
- Chris Willis – backing vocals
- Ace Young – backing vocals
- Neil Zlozower – photography

== Charts and sales ==
Country	Peak position	Sales/shipments
United States	160	10,000
