= American Idol season 5 =

American Idol
- Season 5
- Hosted by: Ryan Seacrest
- Judges: Paula Abdul; Simon Cowell; Randy Jackson
- Winner: Taylor Hicks
- Runner-up: Katharine McPhee
- Finals venue: Kodak Theatre

Release
- Original network: Fox
- Original release: January 17 – May 24, 2006

Season chronology
- ← Previous; Season 4 Next → Season 6

The fifth season of American Idol began on January 17, 2006, and concluded on May 24, 2006. Paula Abdul, Simon Cowell, and Randy Jackson returned as judges, while Ryan Seacrest returned as host. Taylor Hicks was named the winner, while Katharine McPhee was the runner-up. 18 contestants (including all of the top 10 and a few top 24 contestants) got record deals – nine of them with major labels.

== Regional auditions ==
Auditions were held in seven cities in the summer and fall of 2005. An audition was originally planned for Memphis, Tennessee, but that was canceled due to the Hurricane Katrina relief effort that was taking place there, and replaced by Las Vegas, Nevada, and Greensboro, North Carolina.

American Idol (season 5) – regional auditions
City	Preliminary date(s)	Preliminary venue	Filming date(s)	Filming venue	Golden tickets
San Francisco, California	August 18, 2005	Cow Palace	Unknown	Parc 55 San Francisco (Note: Later stages of the Austin auditions were held in San Francisco due to Hurricane Katrina, which caused a large number of evacuees to be relocated in Texas. However, the show made no mention of the venue switch and presented the Austin auditions as having taken place entirely in Austin.)	18
Austin, Texas	August 25–26, 2005	Frank Erwin Center	September 28, 2005	Parc 55 San Francisco	12
Boston, Massachusetts	August 31, 2005	Gillette Stadium	October 27, 2005	Seaport Hotel and World Trade Center	28
Denver, Colorado	September 11, 2005	Invesco Field at Mile High	Unknown	Colorado Convention Center	37
Chicago, Illinois	September 16, 2005	Soldier Field	September 20, 2005	W Hotel	34
Greensboro, North Carolina	October 3, 2005	Greensboro Coliseum	October 6, 2005	Marriott Downtown	33
Las Vegas, Nevada	October 10–11, 2005	Las Vegas Convention Center	October 12–13, 2005	Renaissance Las Vegas	11
Total number of tickets to Hollywood					175

One notable audition this season was Paula Goodspeed, a fervent fan of Paula Abdul, who auditioned in Austin. In 2008, Goodspeed made headlines when she committed suicide outside Abdul's home. Abdul later claimed that she had objected beforehand to Goodspeed being at the audition because she knew Goodspeed and had been frightened by her past behavior, but the producers overrode her objection. Producers Ken Warwick and Nigel Lythgoe denied being aware of her fears or that they would put her in danger.

== Hollywood week ==
The Hollywood rounds were held at the Orpheum Theatre in Los Angeles and consisted of 175 contestants. The first round of Hollywood week consisted of a solo a cappella performance with each contestant choosing one song from a list of twelve that were given to each contestant two weeks in advance. Those who did not impress the judges were sent home the following day. After this round, the contestants were separated into four groups, with three groups going through (with 44 contestants chosen). In the Pasadena Civic Center, each were individually taken to the judges' station where they learned whether they would proceed or not. Twenty were cut and the top twenty-four (twelve women and twelve men) were selected.

== Top 24 ==
The top 24 began on February 21, 2006, with the names announced on February 15, 2006. Starting with twelve women and twelve men, the women and the men performed weekly on separate shows, and on the results show, the bottom two women and bottom two men were eliminated each week. The top 24 took place over three weeks, resulting in six women and six men making up the top 12.

Color key:

This contestant was saved by the public vote.
This contestant was in the bottom three, but was saved by the public vote.
This contestant was eliminated.

=== Top 24 (February 21 & 22) ===
Contestants are listed in the order they performed.

Top 24 (Female contestants)
Contestant	Song	Result
Mandisa	"Never"	Safe
Kellie Pickler	"How Far"	Safe
Becky O'Donohue	"Because the Night"	Eliminated
Ayla Brown	"Reflection"	Safe
Paris Bennett	"Midnight Train to Georgia"	Safe
Stevie Scott	"To Where You Are"	Eliminated
Brenna Gethers	"You Are the Sunshine of My Life"	Safe
Heather Cox	"When You Tell Me That You Love Me"	Safe
Melissa McGhee	"When the Lights Go Down"	Safe
Lisa Tucker	"I Am Changing"	Safe
Kinnik Sky	"Get Here"	Safe
Katharine McPhee	"Since I Fell for You"	Safe

Top 24 (Male contestants)
Contestant	Song	Result
Patrick Hall	"Come to My Window"	Eliminated
David Radford	"Crazy Little Thing Called Love"	Safe
Bucky Covington	"Simple Man"	Safe
Will Makar	"I Want You Back"	Safe
Sway Penala	"Reasons"	Safe
Chris Daughtry	"Wanted Dead or Alive"	Safe
Kevin Covais	"One Last Cry"	Safe
Gedeon McKinney	"Shout"	Safe
Elliott Yamin	"If You Really Love Me"	Safe
Bobby Bennett	"Copacabana"	Eliminated
Ace Young	"Father Figure"	Safe
Taylor Hicks	"Levon"	Safe

=== Top 20 (February 28 & March 1) ===
Contestants are listed in the order they performed.

Top 20 (Female contestants)
Contestant	Song	Result
Katharine McPhee	"All in Love Is Fair"	Safe
Kinnik Sky	"Here for the Party"	Bottom three
Lisa Tucker	"Who's Lovin' You"	Safe
Melissa McGhee	"Why Haven't I Heard from You"	Safe
Heather Cox	"Hero"	Eliminated
Brenna Gethers	"Last Dance"	Eliminated
Paris Bennett	"Wind Beneath My Wings"	Safe
Ayla Brown	"I Want You to Need Me"	Safe
Kellie Pickler	"Something to Talk About"	Safe
Mandisa	"Cry"	Safe

Top 20 (Male contestants)
Contestant	Song	Result
Taylor Hicks	"Easy"	Safe
Elliott Yamin	"Moody's Mood for Love"	Safe
Ace Young	"If You're Not the One"	Safe
Gedeon McKinney	"A Change Is Gonna Come"	Safe
Kevin Covais	"I Heard It Through the Grapevine"	Bottom three
Sway Penala	"Overjoyed"	Eliminated
Will Makar	"Lady"	Safe
Bucky Covington	"The Thunder Rolls"	Safe
David Radford	"The Way You Look Tonight"	Eliminated
Chris Daughtry	"Hemorrhage (In My Hands)"	Safe

=== Top 16 (March 7 & 8) ===
Contestants are listed in the order they performed.

Top 16 (Female contestants)
Contestant	Song	Result
Paris Bennett	"Conga"	Safe
Lisa Tucker	"Here's Where I Stand"	Safe
Melissa McGhee	"What About Love"	Safe
Kinnik Sky	"If I Ain't Got You"	Eliminated
Katharine McPhee	"Think"	Safe
Ayla Brown	"Unwritten"	Eliminated
Mandisa	"I'm Every Woman"	Safe
Kellie Pickler	"I'm the Only One"	Safe

Top 16 (Male contestants)
Contestant	Song	Result
Gedeon McKinney	"When a Man Loves a Woman"	Eliminated
Chris Daughtry	"Broken"	Safe
Kevin Covais	"Vincent"	Safe
Bucky Covington	"Wave on Wave"	Safe
Will Makar	"How Sweet It Is (To Be Loved by You)"	Eliminated
Taylor Hicks	"Takin' It to the Streets"	Safe
Elliott Yamin	"Heaven"	Safe
Ace Young	"Butterflies"	Safe

== Top 12 contestants ==
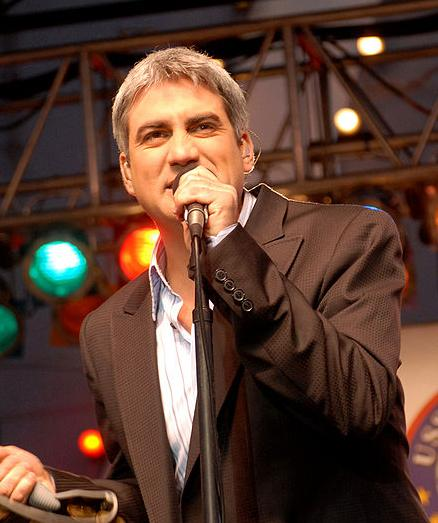
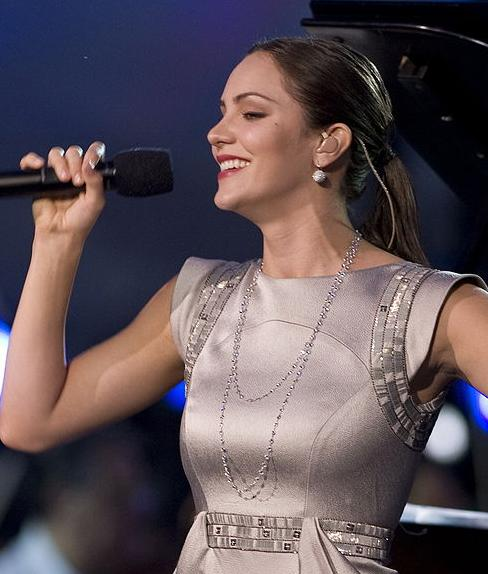
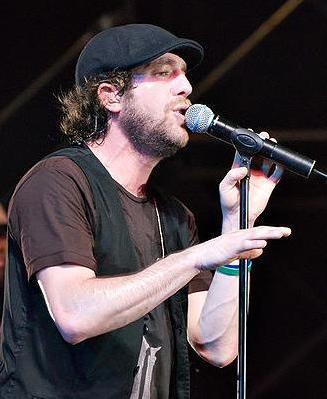
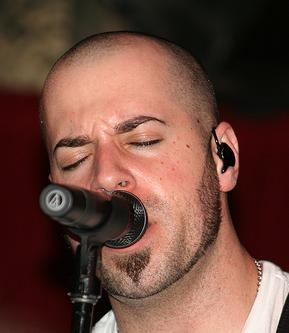
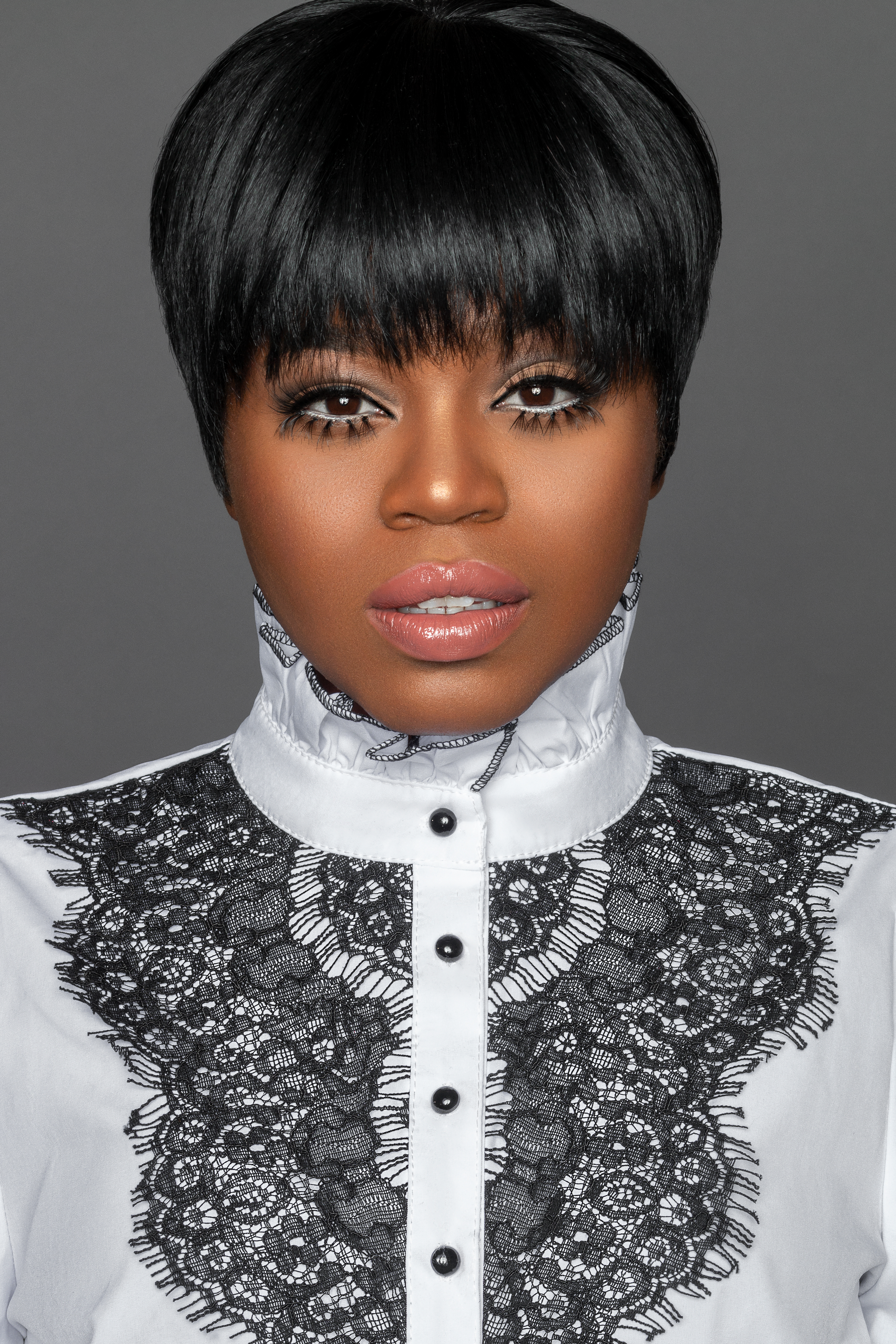
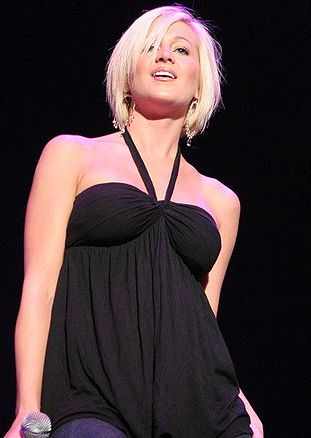
From left to right: Taylor Hicks, Katharine McPhee, Elliott Yamin, Chris Daughtry, Paris Bennett, and Kellie Pickler
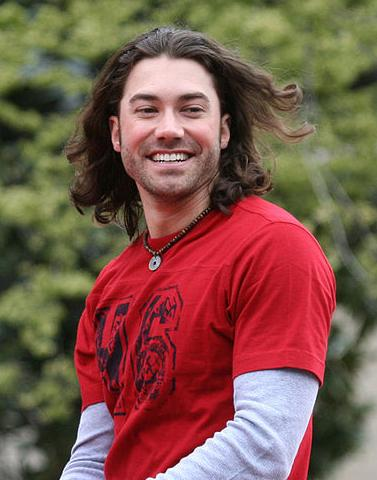
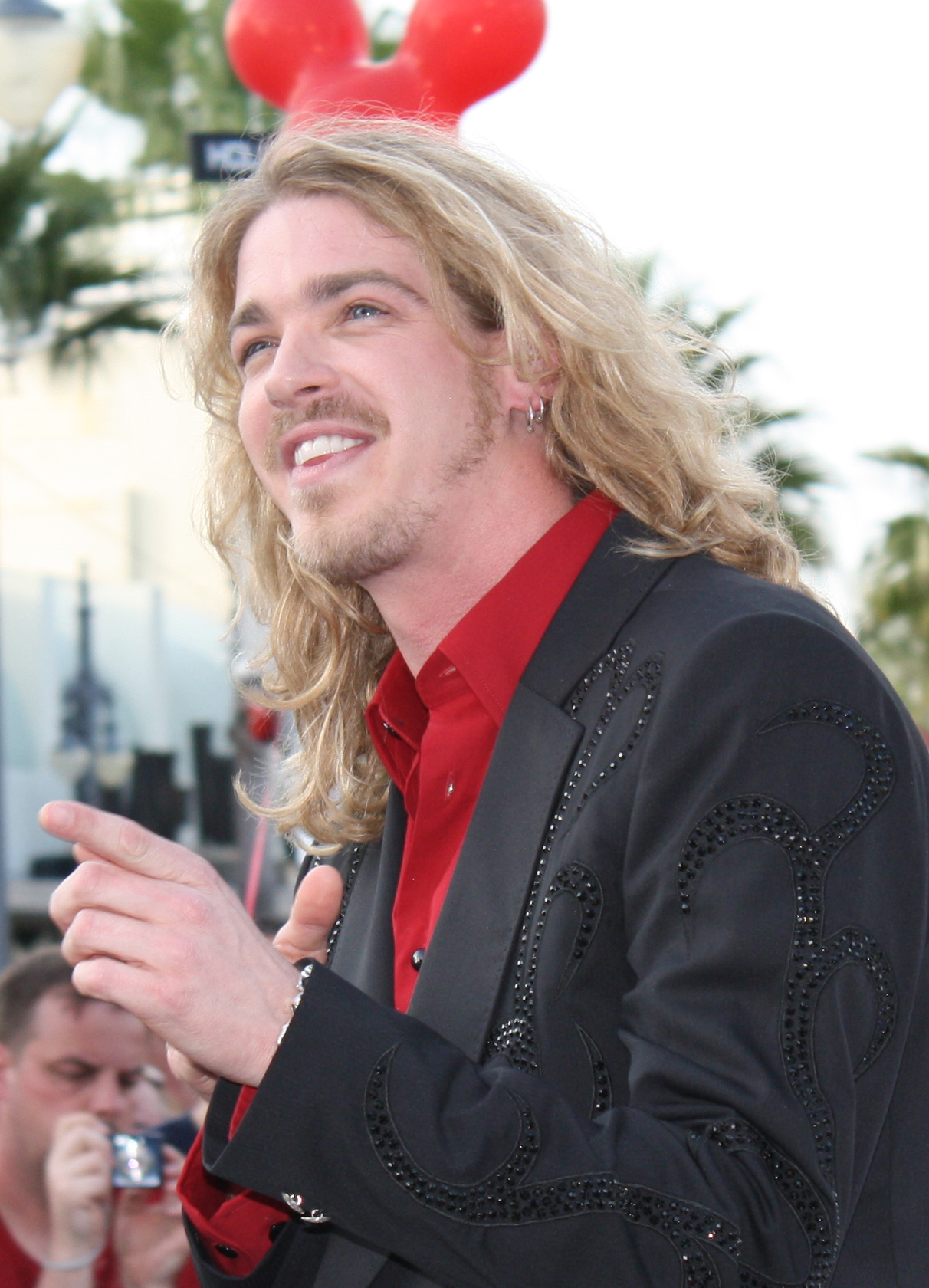
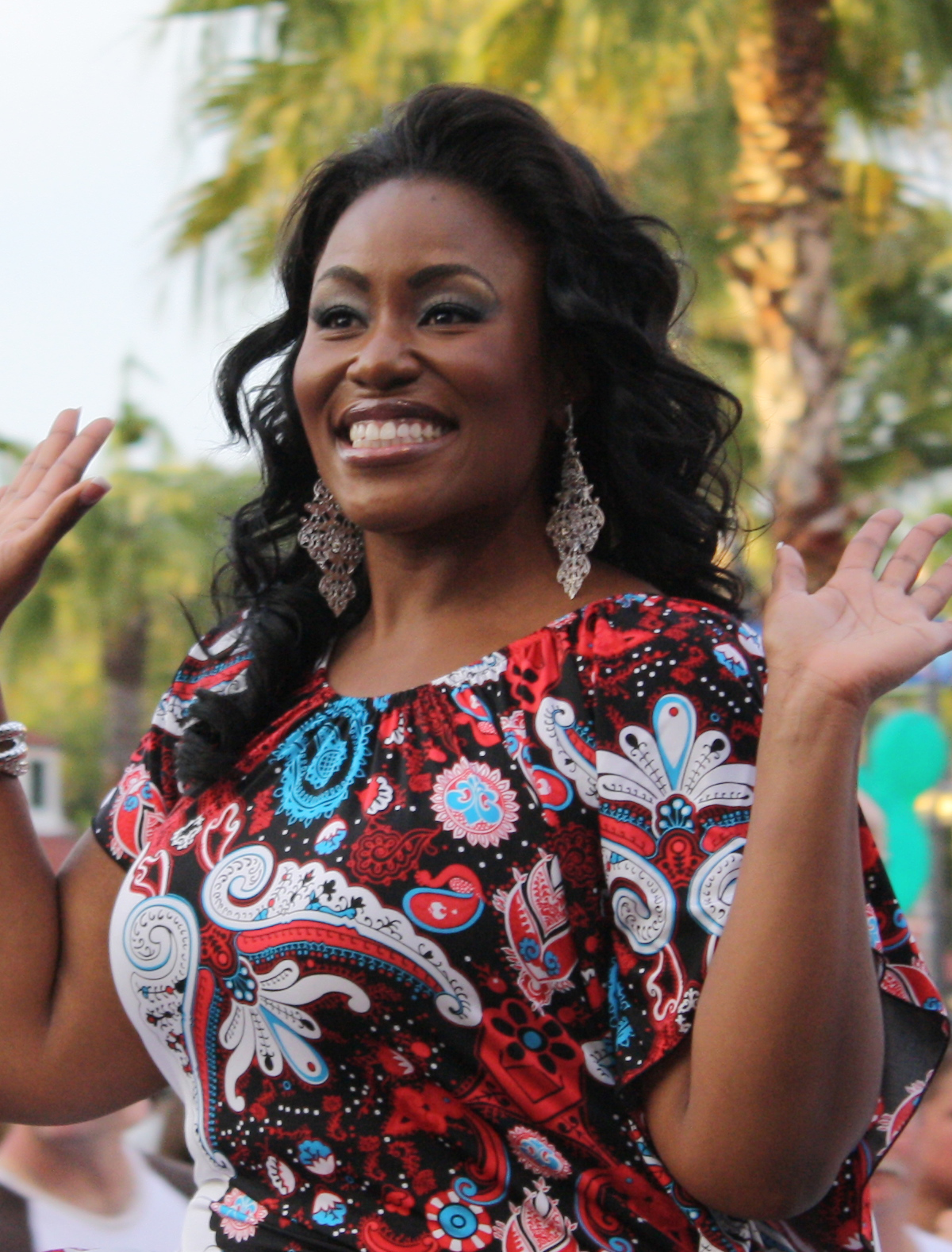
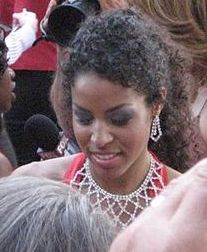
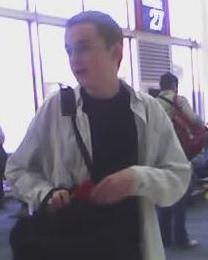
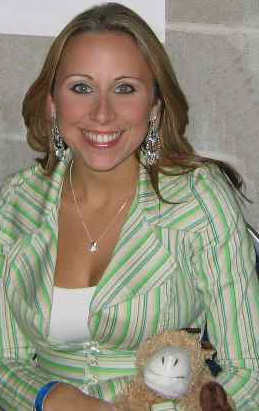
From left to right: Ace Young, Bucky Covington, Mandisa, Lisa Tucker, Kevin Covais, and Melissa McGhee
- Taylor Hicks was from Birmingham, Alabama. He performed "A Change Is Gonna Come" by Sam Cooke at his original audition in Las Vegas. He performed Bill Withers' "Ain't No Sunshine" in Hollywood.
- Katharine McPhee was from Los Angeles, California. She auditioned in San Francisco with Billie Holiday's "God Bless the Child," and Randy Jackson said her audition was the best he'd heard yet that season. In Hollywood, she performed Dionne Warwick's "I'll Never Love This Way Again," "I Can't Help Myself (Sugar Pie Honey Bunch)," and "My Funny Valentine."
- Elliott Yamin was born in Los Angeles, California, but grew up in Richmond, Virginia. He auditioned in Boston. In Hollywood, he performed Rascal Flatts' "Bless the Broken Road" and "The Shoop Shoop Song (It's in His Kiss)."
- Chris Daughtry was from McLeansville, North Carolina. He auditioned in Denver with Joe Cocker's "The Letter." In Hollywood, he performed Samantha Sang's "Emotion."
- Paris Bennett was from Fayetteville, Georgia, and was the granddaughter of Grammy Award winner Ann Nesby. She sang "Cowboy Take Me Away" by the Dixie Chicks at her original audition in Greensboro. In Hollywood, she performed LeAnn Rimes's "Can't Fight the Moonlight" and Samantha Sang's "Emotion."
- Kellie Pickler was from Albemarle, North Carolina. She originally auditioned in Greensboro.
- Ace Young was from Denver, Colorado, where he auditioned. In Hollywood, he performed Shai's "If I Ever Fall in Love" and Samantha Sang's "Emotion."
- Bucky Covington was from Rockingham, North Carolina. He auditioned in Greensboro.
- Mandisa was from Antioch, Tennessee. She had a successful original audition in Chicago, where she performed Alicia Keys's "Fallin'." In Hollywood, she performed Freda Payne's "Band of Gold."
- Lisa Tucker was from Anaheim, California, and auditioned in Denver with Whitney Houston's "One Moment in Time."
- Kevin Covais was from Levittown, New York. For his audition in Boston, he sang "You Raise Me Up". In Hollywood, he performed Shai's "If I Ever Fall in Love."
- Melissa McGhee was from Tampa, Florida, but she auditioned in Denver with "Can't Fight the Moonlight" by LeAnn Rimes.

== Live Shows ==
Color key:

This contestant was saved by the public vote.
This contestant was in the top two.
This contestant was in the bottom two or three, but was saved by the public vote.
This contestant was eliminated.
This contestant won American Idol.
This contestant was the runner-up.

=== Top 12 – Stevie Wonder (March 15) ===
Stevie Wonder served as a guest mentor this week. Contestants performed one song from his discography and are listed in the order they performed.

Contestant	Stevie Wonder song	Result
Ace Young	"Do I Do"	Bottom three
Kellie Pickler	"Blame It on the Sun"	Safe
Elliott Yamin	"Knocks Me Off My Feet"	Safe
Mandisa	"Don't You Worry 'bout a Thing"	Safe
Bucky Covington	"Superstition"	Safe
Melissa McGhee	"Lately"	Eliminated
Lisa Tucker	"Signed, Sealed, Delivered I'm Yours"	Bottom two
Kevin Covais	"Part-Time Lover"	Safe
Katharine McPhee	"Until You Come Back to Me (That's What I'm Gonna Do)"	Safe
Taylor Hicks	"Living for the City"	Safe
Paris Bennett	"All I Do"	Safe
Chris Daughtry	"Higher Ground"	Safe

Non-competition performance
Performers	Song
Stevie Wonder	"My Love Is On Fire"

=== Top 11 – Music from the 1950s (March 22) ===
Barry Manilow served as a guest mentor this week. Contestants are listed in the order they performed.

Contestant	Song	Result
Mandisa	"I Don't Hurt Anymore"	Safe
Bucky Covington	"Oh, Boy!"	Bottom two
Paris Bennett	"Fever"	Safe
Chris Daughtry	"I Walk the Line"	Safe
Katharine McPhee	"Come Rain or Come Shine"	Safe
Taylor Hicks	"Not Fade Away"	Safe
Lisa Tucker	"Why Do Fools Fall in Love?"	Bottom three
Kevin Covais	"When I Fall in Love"	Eliminated
Elliott Yamin	"Teach Me Tonight"	Safe
Kellie Pickler	"Walkin' After Midnight"	Safe
Ace Young	"In the Still of the Night"	Safe

Non-competition performance
Performers	Song
Barry Manilow	"Love Is a Many-Splendored Thing"

=== Top 10 – Music from the 2000s (March 29) ===
Contestants are listed in the order they performed.

Contestant	Song	Result
Lisa Tucker	"Because of You"	Eliminated
Kellie Pickler	"Suds in the Bucket"	Safe
Ace Young	"Drops of Jupiter (Tell Me)"	Bottom three
Taylor Hicks	"Trouble"	Safe
Mandisa	"Shackles (Praise You)"	Safe
Chris Daughtry	"What If"	Safe
Katharine McPhee	"The Voice Within"	Bottom two
Bucky Covington	"Real Good Man"	Safe
Paris Bennett	"Work It Out"	Safe
Elliott Yamin	"I Don't Want to Be"	Safe

Non-competition performance
Performers	Song
Shakira & Wyclef Jean	"Hips Don't Lie"

=== Top 9 – Country music (April 5) ===
Kenny Rogers served as a guest mentor this week. Contestants are listed in the order they performed.

Contestant	Country song	Result
Taylor Hicks	"Take Me Home, Country Roads"	Safe
Mandisa	"Any Man of Mine"	Eliminated
Elliott Yamin	"If Tomorrow Never Comes"	Bottom two
Paris Bennett	"How Do I Live"	Bottom three
Ace Young	"Tonight I Wanna Cry"	Safe
Kellie Pickler	"Fancy"	Safe
Chris Daughtry	"Making Memories of Us"	Safe
Katharine McPhee	"Bringing Out the Elvis in Me"	Safe
Bucky Covington	"Best I Ever Had (Grey Sky Morning)"	Safe

Non-competition performance
Performers	Song
Kenny Rogers	"I Can't Unlove You"

=== Top 8 – Queen (April 12) ===
Queen band members Brian May and Roger Taylor served as guest mentors for this week. Contestants performed one song from the Queen discography and are listed in the order they performed.

Contestant	Queen song	Result
Bucky Covington	"Fat Bottomed Girls"	Eliminated
Ace Young	"We Will Rock You"	Bottom three
Kellie Pickler	"Bohemian Rhapsody"	Safe
Chris Daughtry	"Innuendo"	Safe
Katharine McPhee	"Who Wants to Live Forever"	Safe
Elliott Yamin	"Somebody to Love"	Bottom three
Taylor Hicks	"Crazy Little Thing Called Love"	Safe
Paris Bennett	"The Show Must Go On"	Safe

Non-competition performance
Performers	Song
Top 8	Queen medley

=== Top 7 – Great American Songbook (April 19) ===
Rod Stewart served as a guest mentor this week. Contestants performed one song from the Great American Songbook and are listed in the order they performed.

Contestant	Song	Result
Chris Daughtry	"What a Wonderful World"	Bottom two
Paris Bennett	"These Foolish Things (Remind Me of You)"	Bottom three
Taylor Hicks	"You Send Me"	Safe
Elliott Yamin	"It Had to Be You"	Safe
Kellie Pickler	"Bewitched, Bothered and Bewildered"	Safe
Ace Young	"That's All"	Eliminated
Katharine McPhee	"Someone to Watch Over Me"	Safe

Non-competition performance
Performers	Song
Rod Stewart	"The Way You Look Tonight"

=== Top 6 – Love songs (April 26) ===
Andrea Bocelli and David Foster served as guest mentors this week. Contestants are listed in the order they performed.

Contestant	Song	Result
Katharine McPhee	"I Have Nothing"	Top two
Elliott Yamin	"A Song for You"	Safe
Kellie Pickler	"Unchained Melody"	Eliminated
Paris Bennett	"The Way We Were"	Bottom two
Taylor Hicks	"Just Once"	Safe
Chris Daughtry	"Have You Ever Really Loved a Woman?"	Top two

Non-competition performance
Performers	Song
Andrea Bocelli & David Foster	"Because We Believe"

=== Top 5 – Contestants' birth year & Current Billboard top 10 (May 3) ===
Contestants each performed two songs: one from the year they were born, and one from the current Billboard top 10 list. Contestants are listed in the order they performed.

Contestant	Order	Song	Birth year	Result
Elliott Yamin	1	"On Broadway"	1978	Bottom two
Elliott Yamin	6	"Home"	1978	Bottom two
Paris Bennett	2	"Kiss"	1988	Eliminated
Paris Bennett	7	"Be Without You"	1988	Eliminated
Chris Daughtry	3	"Renegade"	1979	Safe
Chris Daughtry	8	"I Dare You"	1979	Safe
Katharine McPhee	4	"Against All Odds (Take a Look at Me Now)"	1984	Safe
Katharine McPhee	9	"Black Horse and the Cherry Tree"	1984	Safe
Taylor Hicks	5	"Play That Funky Music"	1976	Safe
Taylor Hicks	10	"Something"	1976	Safe

Non-competition performance
Performers	Song
Top 5	"Together We Are One"

=== Top 4 – Elvis Presley (May 10) ===
Tommy Mottola served as a guest mentor this week. Contestants each performed two songs from the Elvis Presley discography and are listed in the order they performed.

Contestant	Order	Elvis Presley song	Result
Taylor Hicks	1	"Jailhouse Rock"	Safe
Taylor Hicks	5	"In the Ghetto"	Safe
Chris Daughtry	2	"Suspicious Minds"	Eliminated
Chris Daughtry	6	"A Little Less Conversation"	Eliminated
Elliott Yamin	3	"If I Can Dream"	Safe
Elliott Yamin	7	"Trouble"	Safe
Katharine McPhee	4	"Hound Dog" & "All Shook Up"	Bottom two
Katharine McPhee	8	"Can't Help Falling in Love"	Bottom two

Non-competition performance
Performers	Song
Top 4	Elvis Presley medley

=== Top 3 (May 17) ===
Each contestant performed three songs: one chosen by Clive Davis, one chosen by one of the judges, and one chosen by themselves. Contestants are listed in the order they performed.

Contestant	Order	Song	Result
Elliott Yamin	1	"Open Arms" (Note: Song chosen by Clive Davis)	Eliminated
Elliott Yamin	4	"What You Won't Do for Love" (Note: Song chosen by Paula Abdul)	Eliminated
Elliott Yamin	7	"I Believe to My Soul"	Eliminated
Katharine McPhee	2	"I Believe I Can Fly"	Safe
Katharine McPhee	5	"Over the Rainbow" (Note: Song chosen by Simon Cowell)	Safe
Katharine McPhee	8	"I Ain't Got Nothin' but the Blues"	Safe
Taylor Hicks	3	"Dancing in the Dark"	Safe
Taylor Hicks	6	"You Are So Beautiful" (Note: Song chosen by Randy Jackson)	Safe
Taylor Hicks	9	"Try a Little Tenderness"	Safe

Non-competition performance
Performers	Song
Taylor Hicks	"Takin' It to the Streets"
Katharine McPhee	"Think"
Elliott Yamin	"Moody's Mood for Love"

=== Top 2 – Finale (May 24) ===
Each contestant performed three songs, and contestants are listed in the order they performed.

Contestant	Order	Song	Result
Katharine McPhee	1	"Black Horse and the Cherry Tree"	Runner-up
Katharine McPhee	3	"Over the Rainbow"	Runner-up
Katharine McPhee	5	"My Destiny"	Runner-up
Taylor Hicks	2	"Living for the City"	Winner
Taylor Hicks	4	"Levon"	Winner
Taylor Hicks	6	"Do I Make You Proud"	Winner

Non-competition performances
Performers	Song
Top 12 with Carrie Underwood	"Through the Rain"
Paris Bennett with Al Jarreau	"We're in This Love Together"
Chris Daughtry with Live	"Mystery"
Katharine McPhee with Meat Loaf	"It's All Coming Back to Me Now"
Taylor Hicks, Elliott Yamin, Chris Daughtry, Ace Young, Bucky Covington & Kevin Covais	"Takin' Care of Business" "Tobacco Road" "Don't Stop"
Elliott Yamin with Mary J. Blige	"One"
Carrie Underwood	"Don't Forget to Remember Me"
Taylor Hicks with Toni Braxton	"In the Ghetto"
Katharine McPhee, Paris Bennett, Kellie Pickler, Mandisa, Lisa Tucker & Melissa McGhee	"Man! I Feel Like a Woman!" "Trouble" "I'm a Woman" "(You Make Me Feel Like) A Natural Woman" "I'm Every Woman"
Michael Sandecki with Clay Aiken	"Don't Let the Sun Go Down on Me"
Top 12 with Dionne Warwick	"What the World Needs Now Is Love" "The Look of Love" "I'll Never Fall in Love Again" "Raindrops Keep Fallin' on My Head" "I Say a Little Prayer" "Alfie" "A House Is Not a Home" "What's New Pussycat?" "Arthur's Theme (Best That You Can Do)" "Close to You" "Walk On By" "That's What Friends Are For"
Prince	"Lolita" "Satisfied"
Taylor Hicks & Katharine McPhee	"(I've Had) The Time of My Life"

== Elimination chart ==
Color key:

Winner
Runner-up
Saved by the public
Top two
Bottom two or three
Eliminated

American Idol (season 5) - Eliminations
Contestant	Pl.	Top 24			Top 12	Top 11	Top 10	Top 9	Top 8	Top 7	Top 6	Top 5	Top 4	Top 3	Finale
Contestant	Pl.	2/23	3/2	3/9	3/15	3/22	3/29	4/5	4/12	4/19	4/26	5/3	5/10	5/17	5/24
Taylor Hicks	1	Safe	Safe	Safe	Safe	Safe	Safe	Safe	Safe	Safe	Safe	Safe	Safe	Safe	Winner
Katharine McPhee	2	Safe	Safe	Safe	Safe	Safe	Bottom two	Safe	Safe	Safe	Top two	Safe	Bottom two	Safe	Runner-up
Elliott Yamin	3	Safe	Safe	Safe	Safe	Safe	Safe	Bottom two	Bottom three	Safe	Safe	Bottom two	Safe	Eliminated	
Chris Daughtry	4	Safe	Safe	Safe	Safe	Safe	Safe	Safe	Safe	Bottom two	Top two	Safe	Eliminated		
Paris Bennett	5	Safe	Safe	Safe	Safe	Safe	Safe	Bottom three	Safe	Bottom three	Bottom two	Eliminated			
Kellie Pickler	6	Safe	Safe	Safe	Safe	Safe	Safe	Safe	Safe	Safe	Eliminated				
Ace Young	7	Safe	Safe	Safe	Bottom three	Safe	Bottom three	Safe	Bottom three	Eliminated					
Bucky Covington	8	Safe	Safe	Safe	Safe	Bottom two	Safe	Safe	Eliminated						
Mandisa	9	Safe	Safe	Safe	Safe	Safe	Safe	Eliminated							
Lisa Tucker	10	Safe	Safe	Safe	Bottom two	Bottom three	Eliminated								
Kevin Covais	11	Safe	Bottom three	Safe	Safe	Eliminated									
Melissa McGhee	12	Safe	Safe	Safe	Eliminated										
Ayla Brown		Safe	Safe	Eliminated											
Will Makar		Safe	Safe	Eliminated											
Gedeon McKinney		Safe	Safe	Eliminated											
Kinnik Sky		Safe	Bottom three	Eliminated											
Heather Cox		Safe	Eliminated												
Brenna Gethers		Safe	Eliminated												
José "Sway" Penala		Safe	Eliminated												
David Radford		Safe	Eliminated												
Bobby Bennett		Eliminated													
Patrick Hall		Eliminated													
Becky O'Donohue		Eliminated													
Stevie Scott		Eliminated													

== Controversies ==
In January 2006, twins Derrell and Terrell Brittenum were charged with forgery and theft after allegedly using a false identity to purchase a car. This occurred after the Hollywood portion of the show was filmed, and the twins were subsequently disqualified.

On the April 25 show, the theme of which was Greatest Love Songs and featured guest mentors Andrea Bocelli and David Foster, executive producer Nigel Lythgoe forced contestant Taylor Hicks to change his song a day before airtime. Hicks' chosen song was "Try a Little Tenderness," but Lythgoe, in a radio interview, claimed the song was more appropriate for a Blues Brothers week and was not a song that Andrea Bocelli would sing. Hicks changed his song at the last minute to "Just Once" and appeared very uncomfortable on stage. Hicks' fans were distressed, feeling that Hicks' original choice of song was very appropriate to the theme and the producers changed the song at the last minute even though they must have known Hicks' choice the previous week. They also felt that Lythgoe's statement that it was not a song Andrea Bocelli would sing was dubious, as other song choices that were approved were songs sung by Bryan Adams ("Have You Ever Really Loved a Woman") and Donny Hathaway ("A Song for You").

== U.S. Nielsen ratings ==
American Idol was the top-rated show for the 2005–06 TV season and occupied the top two positions. The number of viewers for its Tuesday episodes averaged 31.17 million and for the Wednesday episodes 30.16 million. It is still the most-watched of all seasons with an overall average number of viewers of 30.6 million per episode. Its 17.6 household share for the season average still ranks as the highest household share rating for any season-topping series on 21st-century U.S. television.

Episode list

Show	Episode	Air date	Week rank	Rating/Share	18–49 rating/Share	Viewers (millions)
1	"Chicago Auditions"	January 17, 2006	3	19.3 / 28	15.3 / 34	35.53
2	"Denver Auditions"	January 18, 2006	4	17.8 / 27	13.0 / 33	31.65
3	"Greensboro Auditions"	January 24, 2006	1	19.6 / 29	15.1 / 35	34.96
4	"San Francisco Auditions"	January 25, 2006	2	18.2 / 28	13.0 / 33	32.44
5	"Las Vegas Auditions"	January 31, 2006	5	17.4 / 27	12.4 / 31	30.18
6	"Austin Auditions"	February 1, 2006	6	16.9 / 25	12.5 / 32	30.40
7	"Boston Auditions"	February 7, 2006	1	17.6 / 26	12.9 / 32	31.15
8	"Hollywood Round 1"	February 8, 2006	2	16.3 / 24	11.4 / 29	28.74
9	"Hollywood Round 2"	February 14, 2006	2	16.5 / 25	11.4 / 29	26.96
10	"Hollywood: Top 24 Revealed"	February 15, 2006	1	15.5 / 24	11.9 / 30	28.78
11	"Top 12 Women Perform"	February 21, 2006	2	16.9 / 24	13.0 / 30	30.16
12	"Top 12 Men Perform"	February 22, 2006	1	18.2 / 27	13.5 / 33	31.69
13	"Top 24 Results"	February 23, 2006	7	13.3 / 20	9.9 / 24	23.38
14	"Top 10 Women Perform"	February 28, 2006	2	17.0 / 25	12.4 / 31	30.09
15	"Top 10 Men Perform	March 1, 2006	4	16.6 / 26	12.2 / 31	29.64
16	"Top 20 Results	March 2, 2006	5	15.2 / 23	10.9 / 27	26.32
17	"Top 8 Women Men Perform"	March 7, 2006	2	16.7 / 25	11.8 / 31	28.56
18	"Top 8 Men Perform"	March 8, 2006	1	17.2 / 27	12.4 / 32	30.38
19	"Top 12 Revealed"	March 9, 2006	4	15.4 / 24	10.8 / 28	26.63
20	"Top 12 Perform"	March 14, 2006	1	18.5 / 27	13.7 / 33	32.77
21	"Top 12 Results"	March 15, 2006	1	16.3 / 25	11.5 / 27	28.09
22	"Top 11 Perform"	March 21, 2006	1	19.2 / 28	13.6 / 33	33.36
23	"Top 11 Results"	March 22, 2006	2	15.9 / 24	11.4 / 27	27.68
24	"Top 10 Perform"	March 28, 2006	1	18.0 / 27	13.0 / 33	31.71
25	"Top 10 Results"	March 29, 2006	2	15.9 / 24	11.3 / 27	27.66
26	"Top 9 Perform"	April 4, 2006	1	16.6 / 23	11.6 / 32	28.83
27	"Top 9 Results"	April 5, 2006	2	15.7 / 23	10.8 / 26	26.23
28	"Top 8 Perform"	April 11, 2006	1	14.2 / 22	12.0 / 33	29.65
29	"Top 8 Results"	April 12, 2006	3	12.0 / 19	9.2 / 24	22.64
30	"Top 7 Perform"	April 18, 2006	1	16.6 / 26	11.4 / 32	28.44
31	"Top 7 Results"	April 19, 2006	2	16.5 / 25	11.3 / 30	27.63
32	"Top 6 Perform"	April 25, 2006	1	16.7 / 26	11.5 / 30	28.67
33	"Top 6 Results"	April 26, 2006	2	16.6 / 25	11.6 / 28	28.27
34	"Top 5 Perform"	May 2, 2006	2	16.6 / 26	11.4 / 31	28.58
35	"Top 5 Results"	May 3, 2006	1	16.9 / 25	11.7 / 28	29.26
36	"Top 4 Perform"	May 9, 2006	1	16.8 / 26	11.6 / 31	28.85
37	"Top 4 Results"	May 10, 2006	2	16.1 / 24	11.2 / 27	27.88
38	"Top 3 Perform"	May 16, 2006	1	16.6 / 26	11.0 / 30	28.33
39	"Top 3 Results"	May 17, 2006	2	16.6 / 26	10.7 / 25	27.67
40	"Top 2 Perform"	May 23, 2006	2	18.2/ 29	12.3 / 34	31.78
41	"Season 5 Finale"	May 24, 2006	1	20.5 / 32	14.2 / 35	36.38

== Post Idol ==
This was the first season where a majority of finalists had major label recording contracts after American Idol. Of them, Taylor Hicks, Katharine McPhee, Elliott Yamin, Chris Daughtry, and Kellie Pickler were distributed by Sony BMG Music Entertainment; Bucky Covington by Universal Music Group; and Ace Young and Mandisa by EMI.

Taylor Hicks' first post-Idol single, "Do I Make You Proud," debuted at number one and was certified gold. Hicks' album, Taylor Hicks, sold 703,000 copies. He later parted with Arista Records. His follow-up album, "The Distance," was released March 10, 2009, on his own label, Modern Whomp Records.

The contestant with the most commercial success was Chris Daughtry, now lead singer of the band Daughtry. Their eponymous debut album sold over 5 million copies, surpassing the two-album totals of former winners Ruben Studdard and Fantasia, and produced two top-ten singles. The album, which spent two weeks at number one in the U.S., was also the fastest-selling debut rock album in Soundscan history.

Katharine McPhee's debut album sold 374,000 copies and she had two Top 40 Billboard hits. Kellie Pickler's Small Town Girl reached number one on the Billboard Top Country Albums chart and was certified gold, selling over 815,000 copies. Elliott Yamin's eponymous debut album was certified gold and produced a platinum-selling single. Bucky Covington's self-titled debut album sold over 400,000 copies and generated a top 20 and two top 10 hits on the Billboard Hot Country Singles chart. Mandisa became the most recent finalist from American Idol as of 2026 to win a Grammy Award, after earning a nomination for True Beauty for Best Pop/Contemporary Gospel Album in 2007 and winning for Overcomer for Best Contemporary Christian Music Album in 2014.

== Music releases ==
The compilation album for this season was performed by the top twelve finalists.

Information	Digital Downloads
American Idol Season 5: Encores: Released: May 23, 2006; Label: RCA Records; Chart Positions: – 3 (US); RIAA Certification: – Gold; U.S. sales: – 381,075	Alphabetical order by song title: "Father Figure"; (108 US): "Midnight Train to Georgia"; (52 US Pop): "Moody's Mood for Love"; (73 US Pop, 76 US Digital): "Takin' It to the Streets"; (69 US, 42 US Digital): "Think"; (121 US, 90 US Pop): "Wanted Dead or Alive"; (43 US, 11 US Digital, 37 US Pop)

== Emmy nominations ==
In 2006, American Idol received several nominations in the 2006 Emmy Awards for season five:

- Outstanding Reality-Competition Program
- Outstanding Art Direction for a Variety, Music Program or Special – Episode #519
- Outstanding Directing for a Variety, Music or Comedy Program – Bruce Gowers
- Outstanding Picture Editing for Nonfiction Programming (Large team entries – Primarily Multi-Camera Productions) – "Audition City: Greensboro"
- Outstanding Lighting Direction – "American Classics Songbook with Rod Stewart"
- Outstanding Lighting Direction – "Finale"
- Outstanding Sound Mixing for a Variety or Music Series or Special or Animation – "American Classics Songbook with Rod Stewart"
- Outstanding Technical Direction, Camerawork, Video for a Series – Episode #530

== Tour ==
- American Idols Live! Tour 2006
