= Paris Bennett =

American singer (born 1988)

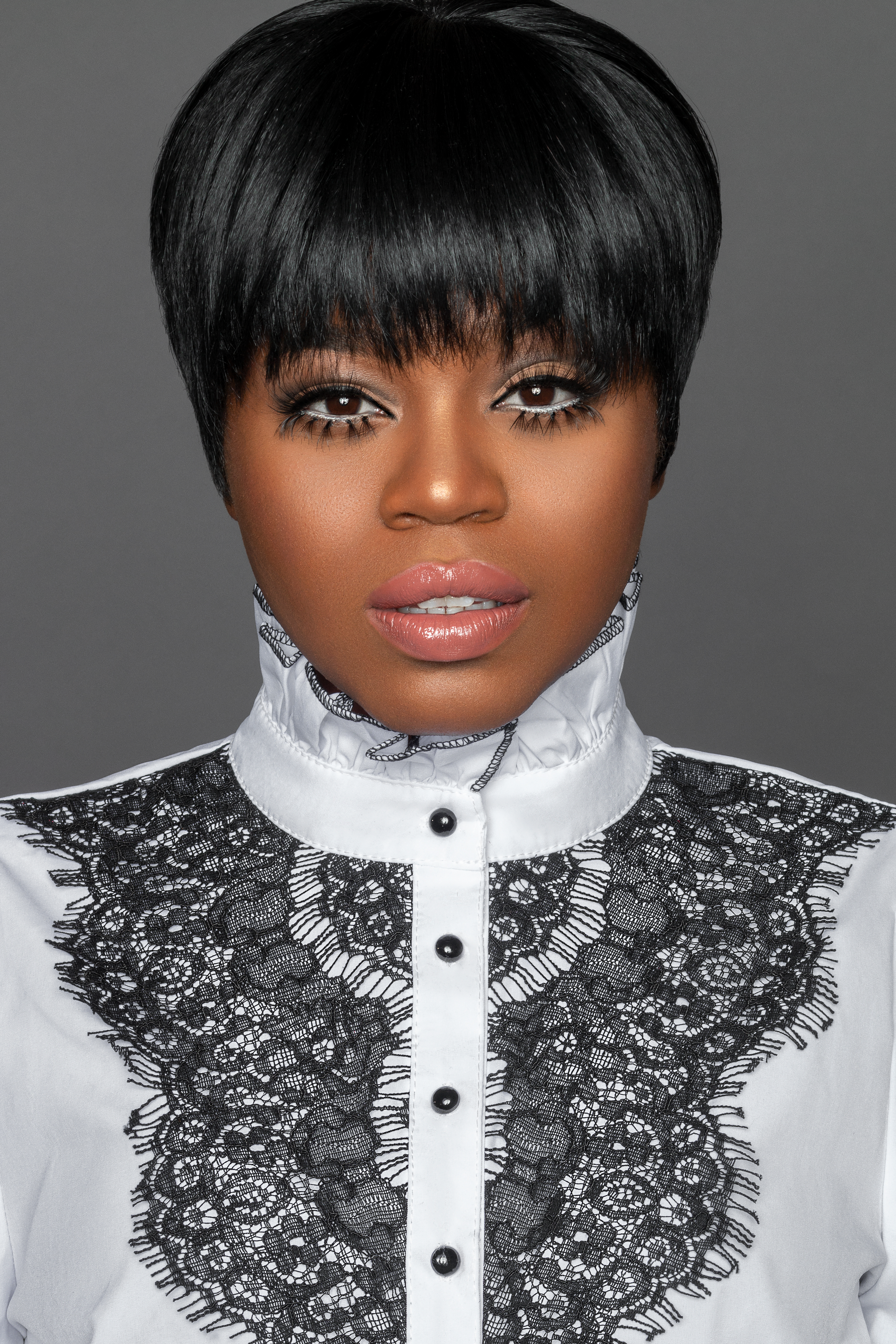
- Paris Bennett

Background information
- Also known as: Paris
- Born: Paris Ana'is Bennett; August 21, 1988 (age 38); Rockford, Illinois, U.S.
- Origin: Fayetteville, Georgia, U.S.
- Genres: R&B; pop
- Years active: 2006–present
- Label: Independent

Paris Ana'is Bennett (born August 21, 1988) is an American singer who finished in fifth place on the fifth season of the reality television talent show, American Idol.

== Biography ==
=== Early years ===
Bennett was born in Rockford, Illinois, to Jamecia Venzett Bennett, former soprano vocalist of the vocal ensemble Sounds of Blackness, and current solo artist. Bennett was raised by her mother and father downtown developer Nedal "Ned" Abdul, in Edina, Minnesota. Bennett began performing at the age of six, and was trained by her mother and grandmother, Ann Nesby, the former lead singer of the Sounds of Blackness.

Bennett has three younger brothers, Shakur Jamez, and Orlando Bennett attended Edina High School and played the part of Dorothy in the school production of "The Wiz" in 2003. Bennett's favorite artists are Gladys Knight, Etta James, Sarah Vaughan, Billie Holiday and Aretha Franklin. In 2004, Bennett moved to Fayetteville, Georgia to live with her grandparents and began her senior year at Starr's Mill High School.

Bennett had decided to pursue gynaecology, not wanting to walk in the limelight of her family. However, Bennett's grandfather, Tim Lee, saw that the American Idol auditions were being held in Greensboro, and Bennett agreed to try out but said she would give up singing if she did not make it, as stated on the show.

=== American Idol ===
In her audition, Bennett first performed the Dixie Chicks' "Cowboy Take Me Away", and was complimented by Paula Abdul on her voice. Bennett then chose to sing "Take Five" which she mistakenly attributed to Billie Holiday (the song was composed by Paul Desmond, with the lyrics penned by his wife). Randy Jackson said that she has the lineage (referring to Nesby), Abdul called Bennett incredible, and Simon Cowell asked where she had been hiding. Bennett was given a unanimous vote to go to Hollywood.

In the first Hollywood round, Bennett sang "Can't Fight the Moonlight" and was put through to the next round. She then performed a group performance of "Emotion" with Hannah Freeman and Stevie Scott, which was said by Cowell to be pitiful overall. Bennett was put through. For her third performance, Bennett sang "Fever". She was then put through to the Top 24.

On February 21, Bennett performed "Midnight Train to Georgia" by Gladys Knight & the Pips. The judges enjoyed the performance. On February 28, Bennett performed Bette Midler's "Wind Beneath My Wings", and was told that it was a good vocal performance, and to avoid performing older songs. On March 7, Bennett performed Gloria Estefan's "Conga". The judges liked the decision to sing an uptempo song, although the vocals were average. Bennett was put through to the Top 12 on March 9.

On March 14, the Stevie Wonder theme night, Bennett performed "All I Do". Stevie Wonder, guest coach, said that hearing her reminded him of the excitement of Fantasia Barrino. Jackson said that she had returned to greatness, Abdul called her a seasoned veteran, and Cowell added that she was very confident on the stage.

On March 21, the 1950s theme night, Bennett performed the song she had performed in the Hollywood round, Peggy Lee's "Fever". Barry Manilow praised the depth and power in her vocals. Jackson said that she displayed experience beyond her years, Abdul called her vocals impeccable, and Cowell said it was great.

Bennett performed Beyoncé Knowles' "Work It Out" on the March 28 show, in which the theme was of songs from the past six years. Jackson thought it was the best of the night; Abdul called it awesome. Cowell found it overly precocious.

On April 4, the country theme night, Bennett performed "How Do I Live" by LeAnn Rimes. Kenny Rogers felt that it was a good choice to display Bennett's strengths. Jackson found the beginning weak, but felt she improved somewhat by the end. Abdul did not feel a connection with the song, and thought it seemed a struggle for Bennett. Cowell called the performance very good and an excellent choice of song. On the results night, Bennett was placed in the bottom three with Mandisa and Elliott Yamin, but was not eliminated.

On April 11, the Queen theme night, Bennett sang "The Show Must Go On". Brian May said that he loved everything about Bennett. Jackson told her that it was a little rough in the beginning and middle, but she worked it out in the end. Abdul told Bennett to keep on rocking. Cowell found it a little weird. Bennett was safe. Cowell revealed on April 14 that Bennett was his personal favorite.

April 18 was the Great American Songbook theme night, and Bennett performed "These Foolish Things". Rod Stewart commented that "for seventeen, Paris is amazing." Jackson said that it was her best performance. Abdul said that Bennett could have a hit album of these songs. Cowell found it stylish and classy. Bennett was placed in the bottom three with Chris Daughtry and Ace Young, but was not eliminated.

The theme of the April 25 show was love songs. Bennett performed Barbra Streisand's "The Way We Were". David Foster called her rehearsal performance "very nice", and Andrea Bocelli called her voice spectacular. Jackson said that he liked it although he was not blown away. Abdul thought Bennett oversang in parts, but overall it was the best female vocal of the night. Cowell called it a very good vocal, but old-fashioned. Bennett was in the bottom two with Kellie Pickler, but was not eliminated.

The first theme on May 2 was songs from the contestants' year of birth. Bennett chose "Kiss" by Prince, although the version released in 1988 was by Art of Noise, featuring Tom Jones. Jackson liked the performance. Abdul stated that she loves Bennett singing songs from the past eras. Cowell found it screechy and annoying. The second theme was songs on the current Billboard charts. Bennett performed "Be Without You" by Mary J. Blige. Jackson thought that Bennett rocked it. Abdul thought that she loved Bennett's voice on the song, but was wishing for an individual flip on it. Cowell thought that Bennett did rather well with the song. On May 3, Bennett was placed in the bottom two with Yamin and eliminated from the competition.

Bennett returned to perform on the finale. As did the other top five contestants, Bennett performed a duet with an artist, in this case Al Jarreau, on "We're in This Love Together". She also performed Close To You by Dionne Warwick, and in the girls' medley sang "Man! I Feel Like a Woman!", "Natural Woman", "I'm Every Woman", and "Trouble". Prince, who was appearing for a surprise performance, met and thanked Bennett for singing his song.

Bennett recorded Midnight Train to Georgia for the American Idol Season 5: Encores compilation album. The track has sold 9,100 legal downloads as of August 10, 2006.

=== Post-Idol ===
After "American Idol", Bennett at age 18 began recording and preparing for the release of her debut album, "Princess P" (a nickname given to her by Ryan Seacrest). Bennett appeared on The Tonight Show with Jay Leno on Thursday, May 4, 2006. She got to spin the Wheel of Consolation. She won a Lincoln Aviator, only to have someone come out dressed as Abraham Lincoln wearing aviator glasses. Bennett also appeared on Total Request Live, The Ellen DeGeneres Show, Entertainment Tonight, Live With Regis and Kelly, On Air With Ryan Seacrest, WSTR-FM (on The Steve & Vikki Morning Show), and the Today Show, among others.

In Detroit on May 30, 2006, Bennett sang the National Anthem at a conference finals NBA game between the Detroit Pistons and the Miami Heat. Bennett also held a homecoming concert in Rockford, Illinois. Bennett recorded a duet with John Debney on the official soundtrack of the movie Everyone's Hero. They sang a song called "The Tigers".

Bennett and her mother performed at the 2006 Divas Simply Singing AIDS benefit concert. Bennett performed "Take Five" at "The Gathering Live", a concert to raise awareness of domestic violence. At the 2006 BET Awards, Bennett announced plans for a clothing line, "Tres P" (Three times the Paris), to "help you find your royalty". Bennett, Young, Mandisa and Kevin Covais are all appearing on the Walt Disney World Christmas special. Bennett is performing on the Walt Disney Cruise to St. Lucia, along with Bianca Ryan. Bennet sang the National Anthem at the Minnesota Twins home opener on April 2, 2007, at the Metrodome in Minneapolis, Minnesota.

In 2007, Bennett became an official supporter of Ronald McDonald House Charities and is a member of their celebrity board, called the Friends of RMHC.

=== 2007: Princess P ===
Bennett was signed to 306 Entertainment and worked with Jon Jon Traxx, Darren Lighty, and Rodney Jerkins on her debut album, titled Princess P after the nickname given to her by her family and used affectionately for her by Ryan Seacrest on American Idol. Bennett co-wrote the album with J. Isaac, and says it is based on her experiences before, on, and after American Idol. The R&B and pop album was released on April 24.

Four songs from the album, lead single "Ordinary Love", "Burnt Up", "I'm So Hot", and "Dreamin" can currently be heard in full on Bennett's Myspace. The song "Burnt Up" was recently removed from Bennett's MySpace, and replaced with the slow piano ballad "I Will". Bennett has also confirmed tracks "B-Bye", "Best Friend" (with Jamecia Bennett, Ann Nesby, and Shirley Bennett), "Let Me Rap" (featuring Kevin Covais), and one or more jazz tracks.

The video to "Ordinary Love" was released onto Bennett's management site on February 14, and then taken down due to the single being held back. The video to "Ordinary Love" was officially released onto Yahoo's Music Site on April 23, 2007. The album was released on Tuesday, May 8, 2007. It is distributed by TVT (Tee Vee Tunes) Records and 306 Entertainment. The video, also starring Dustin Breeding, was shot in January 2007 at Icehouse Studios in Minneapolis, Minnesota.

Bennett was featured on Radio Disney's Incubator. After this, "I Will" and "My Boyfriend's Back" were able to be requested.

=== 2008: A Royal Christmas ===
The album includes standards and original tracks, such as "The Holla Day Shuffle," written by her mother Jamecia Bennett. Classics receive R&B arrangements that are alternately modernized ("Li'l Drummer Boy," "Deck the Halls") and kept to low-key contemporary tastefulness ("God Rest Ye Merry," "Silent Night"), while one ("12 Days of Christmas") receives an acoustic jazz backdrop. Bennett was also featured at the San Diego Men's Chorus' (SDMC) 24th annual holiday show on December 6, 2008.

Bennett starred as Dorothy in The Wiz on Broadway. Bennett released an original holiday song, "All I Need for Christmas."

== Personal life ==
Bennett gave birth to a daughter in October 2008.

== Discography ==
=== Albums ===
Year	Album details	Peak chart positions				Certifications (sales threshold)
Year	Album details	US	US R&B	US Heat	US Indie	Certifications (sales threshold)
2007	Princess P: Released: May 8, 2007; Label: 306/TVT; Format: CD	133	47	1	15	US sales: 22,500
2008	A Royal Christmas: Released: October 14, 2008; Label: CC Entertainment; Format: CD	—	—	—	—	

=== Singles ===
Year	Song	US Pop	Album
2006	"Midnight Train to Georgia"	52	American Idol Season 5: Encores
2007	"Ordinary Love"	-	Princess P
2007	"Duet" (featuring J. Isaac)	-	Princess P
2008	"My Boyfriend's Back"	-	Princess P
2018	"All I Need For Christmas"	-	
2019	"Unapologetically Me"	-	

==== Soundtrack appearances ====
Year	Song	Album
2006	"The Tigers" John Debney	Everyone's Hero (Music from the Motion Picture)
2011	"I Will"	Mama, I Want to Sing! - The Soundtrack
