= Ace Young =

American singer, songwriter, and actor (born 1980)

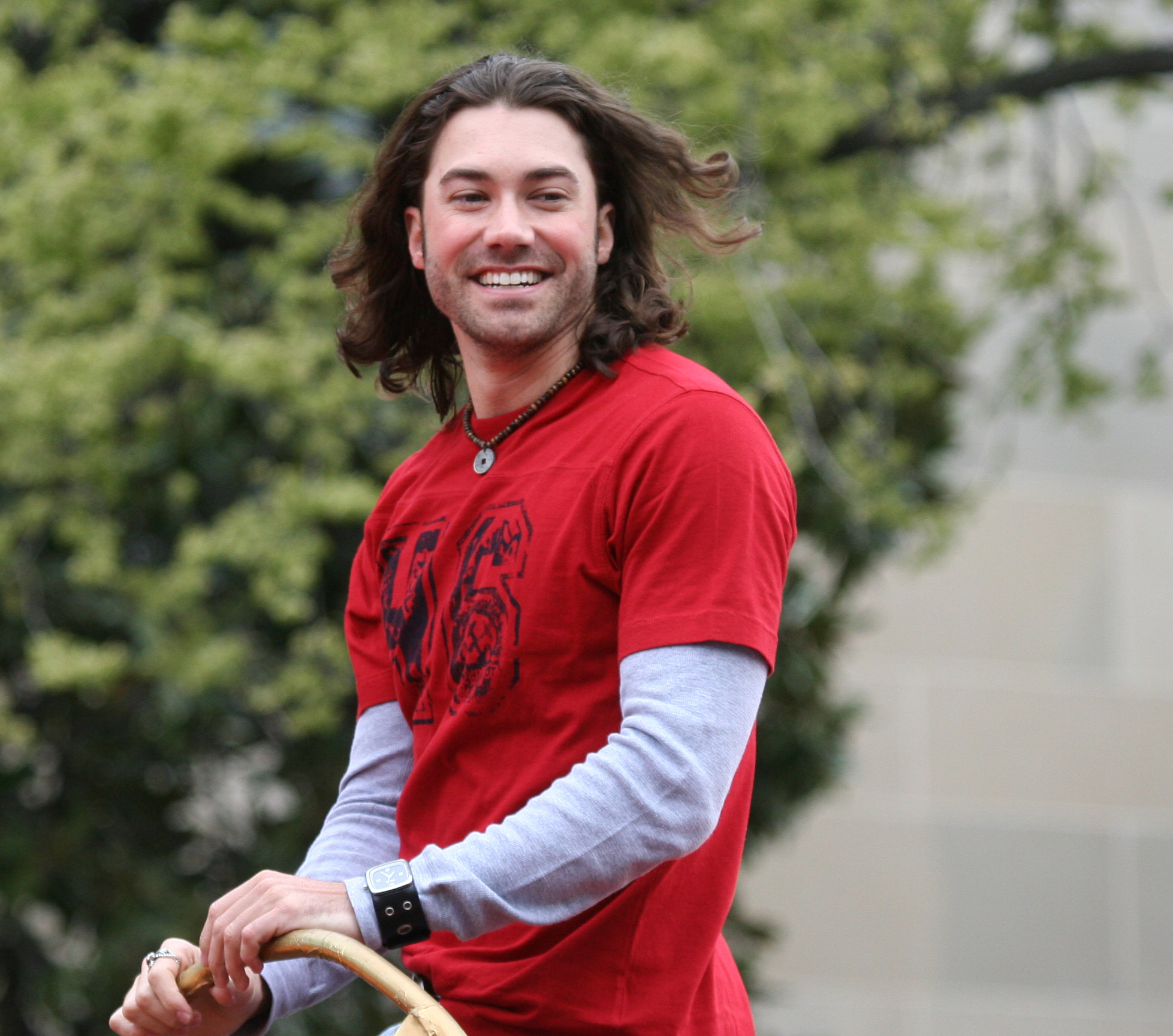

Background information
- Born: Brett Young; November 15, 1980 (age 46); Denver, Colorado
- Genre: Pop
- Instrument: Vocals
- Years active: 2000–present
- Labels: Young Brothers; Mailboat (2012–present)
- Spouse: Diana DeGarmo (m. 2013)

Brett "Ace" Young (born November 15, 1980) is an American singer, songwriter, and actor. He gained national recognition while appearing on the fifth season of American Idol. Young is married to American Idol season-three runner-up Diana DeGarmo.

== Early life and education ==
Brett "Ace" Young was born on November 15, 1980. He was raised in Boulder, Colorado and is the youngest of five boys.

He began writing songs, singing, and taking voice lessons at age 9, and was soon performing at recreation centers and shopping malls. He was first paid for his talent at 11 years old, when he sang at the food court at Boulder’s Crossroads Mall. He performed at various venues in Colorado and other western states, including singing the National Anthem at The Pepsi Center in Denver.

Young attended Fairview High School in Boulder, Colorado. An Eagle Scout, he also participated in athletics, choir, and International Baccalaureate classes, graduating in 1999.

== Career ==
After Young graduated from high school, he wrote a song called "Reason I Live" that was featured on the soundtrack of the 2000 film The Little Vampire.

In 2001, Young moved to Los Angeles, California to continue pursuing his music career. He ultimately met Brian McKnight and was given the chance to open for McKnight and New Edition. Just before auditioning for American Idol, he landed a guest-starring role in an episode of Half & Half, playing a character named Ace Blackwell.

=== American Idol ===
After over four years in Los Angeles without a record deal, Young auditioned for American Idol in Denver, Colorado. His televised audition featured him singing Westlife's "Swear it Again." Young was introduced as Brett Young, with the name "Ace" marked in quotations. Later, he told producers he preferred to be called Ace and he was not referred to as Brett on the show again.

Young made progressed through Hollywood week and sang George Michael's song, "Father Figure" for his live Top 24 performance. He also performed Michael Jackson's song, "Butterflies."

The week that featured the music of Queen and the surviving members of the band as mentors, there was a brief controversy. American Idol's editing of Young's pre-performance package made it appear as if he had offended Brian May and the rest of the band by suggesting a change in the arrangement of "We Will Rock You." May came to Young's defense a few days later when he wrote a blog clarifying he and the band felt their mentoring session was a productive exchange of ideas for the arrangement of the song.

The week Young was eliminated the theme was "Songs from the Great American Songbook," with Rod Stewart as mentor. Young sang "That's All." He changed his look for this performance, slicking his hair back and dressing up in a suit and tie. He received mixed reviews from the judges and was joined by Chris Daughtry and Paris Bennett in the bottom 3.

Week	Theme	Song Sung	Artist	Status
Audition	Free choice	"Swear It Again"	Westlife	Selected
Semifinals; Top 24 (12 Men)	-	"Father Figure"	George Michael	Advanced
Semifinals; Top 20 (10 Men)	-	"If You're Not the One"	Daniel Bedingfield	Advanced
Semifinals; Top 16 (8 Men)	-	"Butterflies"	Michael Jackson	Advanced
Top 12	Songs of Stevie Wonder	"Do I Do"	Stevie Wonder	Bottom 3
Top 11	Songs of the 1950s	"In the Still of the Night"	The Five Satins	Safe
Top 10	Songs of the 2000s	"Drops of Jupiter (Tell Me)"	Train	Bottom 3
Top 9	Songs of Country Music	"Tonight I Wanna Cry"	Keith Urban	Safe
Top 8	Songs of Queen	"We Will Rock You"	Queen	Bottom 3
Top 7	Great American Songbook	"That's All"	Nat King Cole	Eliminated

=== Post-Idol ===
After his elimination, Young was a guest and performed on MTV's Total Request Live. He was the first Idol contestant to be on MTV directly after elimination. Young also returned home to perform at the Pepsi Center in Denver. He was named one of People Magazine's "Hottest Bachelors" on June 16, 2006.

He spent the summer of 2006 on the annual American Idol Top 10 tour, after which he released his first single, "Scattered," (co-written with Elvio Fernandes) as a digital download on iTunes. The song reached the Top 50 on the Hot Adult Contemporary sales chart. He also put together a band and started playing gigs around the country.

Young performed at the 2006 Walt Disney Christmas Day Parade along with fellow idol finalists Paris Bennett, Kevin Covais, and Mandisa. He also formed a charity called "Highrollers With Heart" that raised $300,000 to help Children's Hospital in Denver build the Family Hospitality Suite.

Young wrote the chorus for Daughtry's debut single, "It's Not Over." The song was nominated for Best Rock Song at the 50th Annual Grammy Awards nominations on December 6, 2007. Along with co-writers, Gregg Wattenberg, Mark Wilkerson, and Chris Daughtry, Young received a songwriting nomination.

In January 2008, Young was named a Celebrity Ambassador for the Muscular Dystrophy Association (MDA). He appeared on the show every year from 2007 until 2012. In 2011 he hosted the New York MDA telethon. In 2012 he participated in Labor Day weekend's pre-taped MDA "Show of Strength" telethon. He continues to work with MDA through the Nashville chapter.

In April 2008 he released another single, "Addicted," and promoted the song and subsequent video on TNA wrestling. He worked with Bon Jovi producer Desmond Child on his self-titled and self-funded debut album, releasing it independently in July 2008. He wrote seven of the eleven songs on the cd and released it independently to stores and digital retailers.

On May 12, 2008 he appeared on the Fox series Bones alongside season-six American Idol contestant Brandon Rogers. In the episode "Wannabe in the Weeds," Young played an arrogant karaoke singer who was gruesomely murdered. His character sang a Nickelback song, "Far Away." On November 23, 2008, he made an appearance as a bachelor on the VH1 show Rock of Love: Charm School.

Young made his Broadway debut as Kenickie in the revival of Grease on September 9, 2008. He played the role until the show closed January 4, 2009. Young later joined the national tour of Grease in December 2009, this time playing Danny Zuko. He left the tour on February 14, 2010. After Grease, Young took over the role of Berger in the Broadway revival of Hair, succeeding Will Swenson. Young took over the role in March 2010 and remained with the production until the show closed June 27, 2010.

In November 2011, he appeared on the twelfth episode of the second season of the reality TV show The Real Housewives of Beverly Hills.

After Hair, Young started a now defunct music company, called "Young Brothers Entertainment." The company was partnered with Mailboat Records for digital releases but none of the associated acts ever released music through the company outside of Diana DeGarmo and Young himself. Young's single "I Wanna Fall in Love Again" was released on iTunes in May 2012.

Young starred as Joseph in the U.S. national tour of Joseph and the Amazing Technicolor Dreamcoat alongside DeGarmo as the Narrator from January 2014 to April 2015. He and DeGarmo were cast in the first national tour of First Date, which was planned to launch in the fall of 2020.

== Personal life ==
Young lives in Nashville, Tennessee with his wife, Diana DeGarmo. The couple met in 2010 while appearing in Hair on Broadway. They got engaged on the May 23, 2012, American Idol season finale when Young surprised DeGarmo with an on-air marriage proposal. Young and DeGarmo were married on June 1, 2013 in Los Angeles at the Luxe Sunset Boulevard hotel. Young was previously engaged in 2009 to actress Allison Fischer.

== Discography ==
=== Albums ===
Year	Album details	Peak	Certifications (sales threshold)
Year	Album details	US	Certifications (sales threshold)
2008	Ace Young: Released: July 15, 2008; Label: Pazzo Music/Fontana; Format: CD/Digital Download	160	US: 10,000

=== Singles ===
Year	Single	Peak positions	Album
Year	Single	US Pop	Album
2006	"Scattered"	—	n/a
2009	"Addicted"	77	Ace Young
"—" denotes releases that did not chart
