= 98 Degrees discography =

- Studio albums: 7
- Compilation albums: 2
- Singles: 19
- Music videos: 10+

This is a comprehensive listing of official releases by 98 Degrees, an American pop musical group. 98 Degrees has released seven studio albums, two compilation albums, sixteen singles, and over ten music videos under Motown Records and Universal Records.

== Albums ==
=== Studio albums ===
List of studio albums, with selected details, chart positions and certifications
Title	Details	Peak chart positions					Certifications
Title	Details	US	AUS	CAN	JPN	NZ	Certifications
98 Degrees	Released: July 29, 1997; Label: Motown; Formats: CD, cassette	145	—	46	—	—	RIAA: Gold; MC: 3× Platinum
98 Degrees and Rising	Released: October 20, 1998; Label: Motown; Formats: CD, cassette	14	27	24	—	33	RIAA: 4× Platinum
This Christmas	Released: October 19, 1999; Label: Universal; Formats: CD, cassette	27	—	—	—	—	RIAA: Platinum
Revelation	Released: September 26, 2000; Label: Universal; Formats: CD, cassette	2	40	2	26	—	RIAA: 2× Platinum; MC: Platinum
2.0	Released: May 7, 2013; Label: eOne; Formats: CD, digital download	65	—	—	—	—	
Let It Snow	Released: October 20, 2017; Label: Universal; Formats: CD, digital download	—	—	—	—	—	
Full Circle	Released: May 9, 2025; Label: xoxo; Formats: CD, digital download	—	—	—	—	—	
"—" denotes a recording that did not chart or was not released in that territory.

=== Compilation albums ===
List of compilation albums, with selected details and chart positions
Title	Details	Peak chart positions
Title	Details	US
Heat It Up	Japanese album; Released: June 30, 1999; Label: Motown; Formats: CD	—
The Collection	Released: May 7, 2002; Label: Universal; Formats: CD, digital download	153

== Extended plays ==
List of extended plays, with selected details
Title	Details
Summer of 98°	Released: August 20, 2021; Format: Digital; Label: Universal; Note: remix EP

== Singles ==
List of singles, with selected chart positions and certifications, showing year released and album name
Title	Year	Peak chart positions										Certifications	Album
Title	Year	US	AUS	CAN	GER	IRE	NL	NZ	SWE	SWI	UK	Certifications	Album
"Invisible Man"	1997	12	—	4	—	—	—	10	—	—	66	RIAA: Gold	98 Degrees
"Was It Something I Didn't Say"	1998	—	—	—	—	—	—	—	—	—	—		98 Degrees
"True to Your Heart" (featuring Stevie Wonder)	1998	—	73	—	52	—	16	—	—	25	51		98 Degrees and Rising
"Because of You"	1998	3	63	7	99	—	43	—	—	—	36	RIAA: Platinum	98 Degrees and Rising
"The Hardest Thing"	1999	5	24	10	—	31	—	5	—	—	29	RIAA: Gold	98 Degrees and Rising
"I Do (Cherish You)"	1999	13	23	11	—	—	71	43	—	—	—		98 Degrees and Rising
"This Gift"	1999	49	—	25	—	—	—	—	—	—	—		This Christmas
"Thank God I Found You" (with Mariah Carey and Joe)	2000	1	27	2	28	31	24	34	43	17	10	RIAA: Platinum	Rainbow
"Give Me Just One Night (Una Noche)"	2000	2	21	2	—	—	40	12	33	58	61	RIAA: Gold	Revelation
"My Everything"	2000	34	88	—	—	—	—	—	—	—	—		Revelation
"The Way You Want Me To"	2001	—	—	—	—	—	—	—	—	—	—		Revelation
"Why (Are We Still Friends)"	2002	—	—	—	—	—	—	—	—	—	—		The Collection
"Microphone"	2013	—	—	—	—	—	—	—	—	—	—		2.0
"Impossible Things"	2013	—	—	—	—	—	—	—	—	—	—		2.0
"Circle of Life"	2017	—	—	—	—	—	—	—	—	—	—		Non-album singles
"Where Do You Wanna Go?"	2021	—	—	—	—	—	—	—	—	—	—		Non-album singles
"Ain't the Same" (with Brett Kissel)	2022	—	—	— (Note: "Ain't the Same" did not enter the Billboard Canadian Hot 100, but peaked at number 31 on the Canadian Digital Song Sales component chart.)	—	—	—	—	—	—	—		The Compass Project – South Album
"Got U"	2025	—	—	—	—	—	—	—	—	—	—		Full Circle
"Stranger Things (Have Happened)"	2025	—	—	—	—	—	—	—	—	—	—		Full Circle
"—" denotes a recording that did not chart or was not released in that territory.
