= The Collection (98 Degrees album) =

Greatest hits album by 98 Degrees
- Released: May 7, 2002
- Recorded: 1996–2002
- Genres: Pop; R&B
- Length: 55 Minutes
- Label: Universal Records
- Producers: Bruce Carbone, Paris D' Jon & George Jackson

98 Degrees chronology
| Revelation (2000) | The Collection (2002) | 2.0 (2013) |

Singles from The Collection
- 1. "Why (Are We Still Friends)" Released: 2002

The Collection is the only compilation album released by the late 1990s teen pop boy band 98 Degrees. It was released on May 7, 2002. The greatest hits album includes some songs from their old albums, and the smash Mariah Carey hit "Thank God I Found You", on which 98 Degrees collaborated with Joe alongside Carey.

== Track listing ==
1. "Invisible Man" (Dave Deviller; Sean Hosein; Steve Kipner) - 4:42 from 98 Degrees
2. "Because of You" (Anders "Bag" Bagge; Arnthor Birgisson; Christian Karisson; Patrick Tucker) - 4:56 from 98 Degrees and Rising
3. "The Hardest Thing" (David Frank; Steve Kipner) - 4:34 from 98 Degrees and Rising
4. "I Do (Cherish You)" (Dan Hill; Keith Stegall) - 3:45 from 98 Degrees and Rising
5. "Why (Are We Still Friends)" (Alistair Tennant; Karlin; Soulshock; Wayne Hector) - 4:07 Previously unreleased
6. "Thank God I Found You" (Mariah Carey featuring Joe & 98 Degrees) (Mariah Carey; James Harris; Terry Lewis) - 4:18 from Mariah Carey LP Rainbow
7. "Give Me Just One Night (Una Noche)" (Anders "Bag" Bagge; Arnthor Birgisson; Claudia Ogalde) - 3:25 Revelation
8. "My Everything" (Nick Lachey; Anders "Bag" Bagge; Arnthor Birgisson; Justin Jeffre) - 3:51 from Revelation
9. "The Way You Want Me To" (Andrew Lachey; Nick Lachey; Anders "Bag" Bagge; Arnthor Birgisson) - 3:29 from Revelation
10. "This Gift" (Anders "Bag" Bagge; Arnthor Birgisson; Dave Deviller; Sean Hosein) - 4:06 from This Christmas
11. "Was It Something I Didn't Say" (Diane Warren) - 5:12 from 98 Degrees
12. "Never Let Go" (Justin Jeffre) - 4:43 Previously unreleased
13. "True to Your Heart" (featuring Stevie Wonder) (David Zippel; Matthew Wilder) - 4:15 from 98 Degrees and Rising
14. "Chance To Love You More" (Japanese Bonus Track)
15. "The Only Thing That Matter" (Japanese Bonus Track)

Total length: 55 Minutes
