= My2K Tour =

2016 concert tour by 98 Degrees

- Tour by 98°
- Start date: July 8, 2016
- End date: August 29, 2016
- Legs: 1
- No. of shows: 39 in North America

98° concert chronology
- The Package Tour (2013); My2K Tour (2016); 98° at Christmas Tour (2017)

The My2K Tour was the third headlining concert tour by American boy band 98°. Starting summer 2016, the tour will play nearly 40 shows, predominantly featured in the United States. It is considered a "throwback" tour to create nostalgia for fans, with the tour title referencing the Y2K scare. Fellow boy band O-Town were initially thought to be co-headliners for the tour, but are only advertised as special guests.

== Critical reception ==
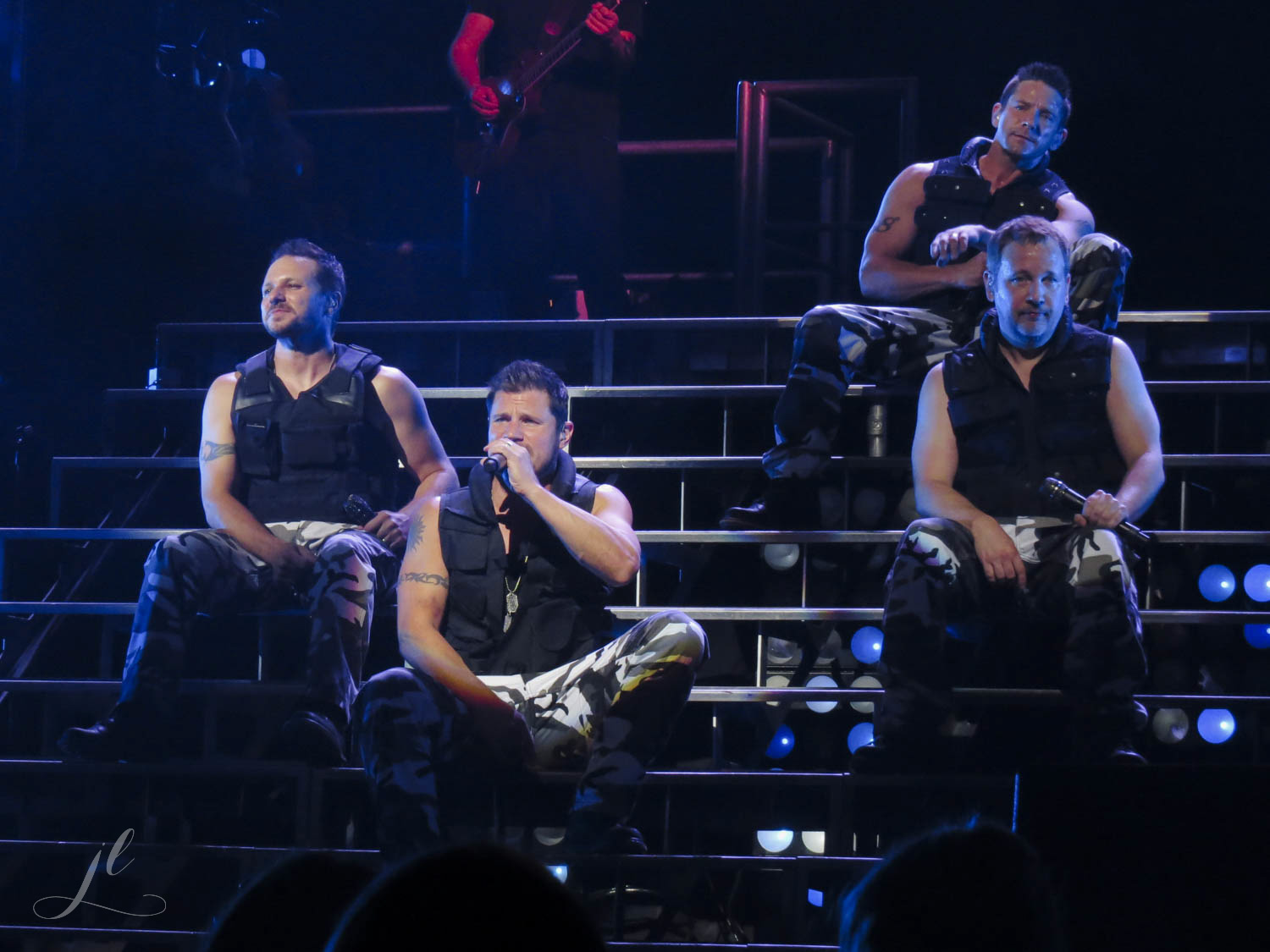
The band performing in Colorado

Nicholas Friedman of The Dallas Morning News called the performance in Dallas "exactly what it should have been". He wrote: "And even though I didn't have any of their posters on my walls, 98 Degrees was a joy to watch, not only because of the nostalgia, but because it gave the crowd a real glimpse into the past".

== Opening acts ==
- Dream
- Ryan Cabrera

Special guests

- O-Town

== Setlist ==
The following setlist was performed at the Hartman Arena in Park City, Kansas. It does not represent all concerts for the duration of the tour.

1. "Heat It Up"
2. "Do You Wanna Dance"
3. "This Is How We Do It"
4. "The Way You Want Me To"
5. "Dizzy"
6. "Invisible Man"
7. "The Hardest Thing"
8. Medley: "Summer Girls" / "Fly" / "I Want It That Way" / "Wannabe" / "All the Small Things" / "...Baby One More Time" / "Bye Bye Bye"
9. "What's Left of Me" (Nick Lachey solo)
10. "Let's Go Crazy" / "1999"
11. "Microphone"
12. "My Everything"
13. "I Do (Cherish You)"

Encore

14. "Give Me Just One Night (Una Noche)"
15. "Because Of You"

== Tour dates ==
Date	City	Country	Venue
North America
July 8, 2016	Park City	United States	Hartman Arena
July 9, 2016	Tulsa	United States	Brady Theater
July 10, 2016	Austin	United States	Moody Theater
July 11, 2016	Dallas	United States	South Side Ballroom
July 12, 2016	Houston	United States	Revention Music Center
July 14, 2016	St. Augustine	United States	St. Augustine Amphitheatre
July 15, 2016	Tampa	United States	MidFlorida Credit Union Amphitheatre
July 16, 2016	West Palm Beach	United States	Perfect Vodka Amphitheatre
July 19, 2016	Nashville	United States	Ryman Auditorium
July 20, 2016	Greenville	United States	Bon Secours Wellness Arena
July 21, 2016	Tuscaloosa	United States	Tuscaloosa Amphitheater
July 22, 2016	Biloxi	United States	Studio A
July 23, 2016	Macon	United States	Grand Opera House
July 26, 2016	Portsmouth	United States	Portsmouth Pavilion
July 27, 2016	Bethlehem	United States	Sands Bethlehem Event Center
July 28, 2016	Huber Heights	United States	Rose Music Center
July 29, 2016	Rochester Hills	United States	Meadow Brook Amphitheatre
July 30, 2016	Rosemont	United States	Rosemont Theatre
August 2, 2016	Cincinnati	United States	PNC Pavilion
August 3, 2016	Northfield	United States	Hard Rock Live
August 5, 2016	Ledyard	United States	Grand Theater
August 6, 2016^{[A]}	Hershey	United States	Hersheypark Stadium
August 7, 2016^{[B]}	Jackson Township	United States	Plymouth Rock Assurance Arena
August 10, 2016^{[C]}	Glen Allen	United States	Servpro Pavilion
August 11, 2016	Westbury	United States	NYCB Theatre at Westbury
August 12, 2016	Atlantic City	United States	Adrian Phillips Theater
August 13, 2016	Vienna	United States	Filene Center
August 14, 2016	Boston	United States	House of Blues
August 17, 2016	New York City	United States	Ford Amphitheater
August 18, 2016	Baltimore	United States	Pier Six Pavilion
August 19, 2016	Indianapolis	United States	Murat Theatre
August 20, 2016	Kansas City	United States	Kansas City Live!
August 21, 2016	Broomfield	United States	1stBank Center
August 23, 2016	West Valley City	United States	Maverik Center
August 25, 2016	Los Angeles	United States	Microsoft Theater
August 26, 2016	Phoenix	United States	Comerica Theatre
August 27, 2016	Las Vegas	United States	Mandalay Bay
August 28, 2016	Saratoga	United States	Mountain Winery Amphitheater
August 29, 2016	San Francisco	United States	Warfield Theatre

Festivals and other miscellaneous performances
^{A} This concert was a part of the "Summer MixTape Festival"
^{B} This concert was a part of the "Six Flags Summer Concert Series"
^{C} This concert was a part of "Innsbrook After Hours"

Cancellations and rescheduled shows

July 11, 2016	Dallas, Texas	Music Hall at Fair Park	Moved to the South Side Ballroom
July 21, 2016	Biloxi, Mississippi	Studio A	Rescheduled to July 22, 2016
August 19, 2016	Indianapolis, Indiana	Egyptian Room	Moved to the Murat Theatre

=== Box office score data ===
Venue	City	Tickets sold / Available	Gross revenue
Adrian Phillips Theater	Atlantic City	1,502 / 2,665 (56%)	$92,524
