= Heat It Up Tour =

1999 concert tour by 98 Degrees

- Tour by 98°
- Associated album: 98° and Rising
- Start date: March 17, 1999
- End date: December 29, 1999
- Legs: 8
- No. of shows: 105 in North America; 8 in Asia; 4 in Australia; 117 Total

98° concert chronology
- Heat It Up Tour (1999); Revelation Tour (2001)

The Heat It Up Tour is the debut concert tour by American boy band 98°. The tour supports the group's second debut album, 98° and Rising. The tour lasted over nine months and visited the Americas, Asia, Australia and Europe.

== Opening acts ==
- Jessica Simpson (North America, select shows)
- B*Witched (North America, select shows)
- No Authority (North America, select shows)
- Joée (Canada)
- Maestro (Canada)
- The Refrigerators (Hunter)
- LP Outsiders (Evansville)

== Setlist ==
The following setlist was obtained from the March 20, 1999 concert; held at the Centennial Hall in London, Ontario. It does not represent all concerts during the tour.

1. "Instrumental Introduction" (contains elements of "Carmina Burana")
2. "Heat It Up"
3. "Come and Get It"
4. "Pretty Fly (for a White Guy)" / "My Name Is" / "1999"
5. "Fly with Me"
6. "Still"
7. "If She Only Knew"
8. "Invisible Man"
9. "I Do (Cherish You)"
10. "She's Out of My Life"
11. "Do You Wanna Dance?"
12. "Superstition" (Stevie Wonder cover)
13. "True to Your Heart"
14. "I Can't Get Next To You" (The Temptations cover)
15. "Because of You"
16. "The Hardest Thing"

== Tour dates ==
Date	City	Country	Venue
North America
March 17, 1999	Ottawa	Canada	Ottawa Congress Centre
March 18, 1999	Montreal	Canada	Spectrum
March 19, 1999	Toronto	Canada	Massey Hall
March 20, 1999	London	Canada	Centennial Hall
March 21, 1999	Hamilton	Canada	Hamilton Place Theatre
March 23, 1999	Thunder Bay	Canada	Thunder Bay Community Auditorium
March 24, 1999	Winnipeg	Canada	Le Rendez-Vous
March 25, 1999	Saskatoon	Canada	Broadway Theatre
March 27, 1999	Calgary	Canada	MacEwan Hall Ballroom
March 28, 1999	Edmonton	Canada	Dinwoodie Lounge
March 30, 1999	Vancouver	Canada	Vogue Theatre
April 2, 1999	Sacramento	United States	Sacramento Memorial Auditorium
April 3, 1999	Berkeley	United States	Berkeley Community Theatre
April 5, 1999	Phoenix	United States	Celebrity Theatre
April 6, 1999	Las Vegas	United States	The Joint
April 7, 1999	San Jose	United States	Event Center Arena
April 8, 1999	Los Angeles	United States	Wiltern Theatre
April 9, 1999	Los Angeles	United States	Wiltern Theatre
April 10, 1999^{[A]}	Houston	United States	Buffalo Bayou Park
April 11, 1999	Salt Lake City	United States	Kingsbury Hall
April 13, 1999	Rosemont	United States	Rosemont Theatre
April 14, 1999	Dayton	United States	Dayton Memorial Hall
April 16, 1999	Cleveland	United States	Palace Theatre
April 17, 1999	Detroit	United States	State Theatre
April 18, 1999	East Lansing	United States	Wharton Center for Performing Arts
April 19, 1999	Grand Rapids	United States	DeVos Performance Hall
April 21, 1999	New York City	United States	Beacon Theatre
April 22, 1999	Camden	United States	Blockbuster-Sony Music Entertainment Centre
April 23, 1999	Westbury	United States	Westbury Music Fair
April 24, 1999	Wallingford	United States	SNET Oakdale Theatre
April 25, 1999	Pittsburgh	United States	Palumbo Center
April 27, 1999	Wilkes-Barre	United States	F.M. Kirby Center for the Performing Arts
April 28, 1999	Fairfax	United States	Patriot Center
April 29, 1999	Richmond	United States	Landmark Theater
April 30, 1999	Columbus	United States	Palace Theatre
May 1, 1999^{[B]}	Nashville	United States	Riverfront Park
May 2, 1999^{[C]}	Atlanta	United States	FOX5 Stage
May 4, 1999	Charlotte	United States	Ovens Auditorium
May 6, 1999	Louisville	United States	Palace Theatre
May 7, 1999	Indianapolis	United States	Murat Theatre
May 8, 1999	Kansas City	United States	Municipal Auditorium
May 9, 1999	Oklahoma City	United States	Starlight Amphitheatre
May 11, 1999	Johnstown	United States	Cambria County War Memorial Arena
May 13, 1999	Myrtle Beach	United States	Palace Theatre
May 14, 1999	Pompano Beach	United States	Pompano Beach Amphitheater
May 15, 1999	Orlando	United States	Nautilus Theater
June 10, 1999^{[D]}	Sacramento	United States	Hornet Stadium
June 16, 1999^{[E]}	Burlington	United States	Burlington Memorial Auditorium
June 17, 1999	Noblesville	United States	Deer Creek Music Center
June 18, 1999	Milwaukee	United States	Marcus Amphitheatre
June 19, 1999	Cuyahoga Falls	United States	Blossom Music Center
June 20, 1999	Clarkston	United States	Pine Knob Music Theatre
June 22, 1999	Scranton	United States	Montage Mountain Performing Arts Center
June 23, 1999	Virginia Beach	United States	GTE Virginia Beach Amphitheater
June 25, 1999	Nashville	United States	First American Music Center
June 26, 1999	Maryland Heights	United States	Riverport Amphitheatre
June 27, 1999	Columbus	United States	Polaris Amphitheatre
June 29, 1999	Mansfield	United States	Great Woods Center for the Performing Arts
June 30, 1999	Camden	United States	Blockbuster-Sony Music Entertainment Centre
July 1, 1999	Hopewell	United States	Finger Lakes Performing Arts Center
July 4, 1999	Charlotte	United States	Blockbuster Pavilion
July 5, 1999^{[F]}	Traverse City	United States	Northwestern Michigan Fairgrounds
July 6, 1999	Burgettstown	United States	Coca-Cola Star Lake Amphitheater
July 7, 1999	Hartford	United States	Meadows Music Theatre
July 9, 1999	Tampa	United States	Ice Palace
July 10, 1999	West Palm Beach	United States	Coral Sky Amphitheatre
July 13, 1999	Raleigh	United States	Alltel Pavilion
July 14, 1999	Atlanta	United States	Lakewood Amphitheatre
July 16, 1999	The Woodlands	United States	Cynthia Woods Mitchell Pavilion
July 17, 1999	Dallas	United States	Starplex Amphitheatre
July 19, 1999	San Angelo	United States	Bill Aylor Sr. Memorial RiverStage
July 23, 1999	Chula Vista	United States	Coors Amphitheatre
July 24, 1999	Phoenix	United States	Blockbuster Desert Sky Pavilion
July 25, 1999	Irvine	United States	Irvine Meadows Amphitheatre
July 26, 1999	Los Angeles	United States	Universal Amphitheatre
July 27, 1999	Los Angeles	United States	Universal Amphitheatre
July 30, 1999	Concord	United States	Concord Pavilion
July 31, 1999	Mountain View	United States	Shoreline Amphitheatre
August 2, 1999^{[G]}	Paso Robles	United States	Frontier Stage
August 3, 1999	Sacramento	United States	ARCO Arena
August 6, 1999	Portland	United States	Rose Garden Arena
August 7, 1999	Nampa	United States	Idaho Center Amphitheater
August 8, 1999	George	United States	The Gorge Amphitheatre
August 9, 1999^{[H]}	Chula Vista	United States	Coors Amphitheatre
August 10, 1999	Greenwood Village	United States	Fiddler's Green Amphitheatre
August 11, 1999^{[I]}	Sioux Falls	United States	W.H. Lyon Fairgrounds
August 12, 1999	Bonner Springs	United States	Sandstone Amphitheater
August 14, 1999	Cincinnati	United States	Riverbend Music Center
August 15, 1999	Rosemont	United States	Allstate Arena
August 16, 1999^{[J]}	Midland	United States	Midland County Fairgrounds
August 17, 1999	Wantagh	United States	Jones Beach Amphitheatre
August 18, 1999	Holmdel Township	United States	PNC Bank Arts Center
August 19, 1999^{[K]}	Fairlea	United States	State Fair of West Virginia Grandstand
August 20, 1999^{[L]}	Hamburg	United States	Hamburg Fairgrounds Grandstand
August 21, 1999	Bristow	United States	Nissan Pavilion
August 26, 1999^{[M]}	Hunter	United States	Hunter Mountain Concert Grounds
August 27, 1999^{[N]}	Byram Township	United States	Waterloo Village Concert Field
August 28, 1999	Lowell	United States	Lowell Memorial Auditorium
August 29, 1999	Gilford	United States	Meadowbrook Musical Arts Center
September 2, 1999^{[O]}	Geddes	United States	New York State Fair Grandstand
September 4, 1999^{[P]}	Detroit	United States	MSF Bandshell
September 5, 1999^{[Q]}	Allentown	United States	Allentown Fair Grandstand
September 6, 1999^{[R]}	Mansfield	United States	Tweeter Center for the Performing Arts
September 7, 1999	Poplar Bluff	United States	Black River Coliseum
September 8, 1999	Springfield	United States	Shrine Mosque Auditorium
September 10, 1999	Lincoln	United States	Pershing Center
September 11, 1999	Des Moines	United States	Veterans Memorial Auditorium
September 12, 1999^{[S]}	Shakopee	United States	Canterbury Park
September 13, 1999^{[T]}	Allegan	United States	Allegan County Fairgrounds
September 15, 1999^{[U]}	York	United States	York Fairgrounds
September 16, 1999	Binghamton	United States	Broome County Veterans Memorial Arena
September 17, 1999^{[V]}	London	Canada	Victoria Park
September 18, 1999^{[W]}	Camden	United States	Blockbuster-Sony Music Entertainment Centre
September 19, 1999	Salisbury	United States	Wicomico Youth and Civic Center
September 20, 1999	Erie	United States	Erie Veterans Memorial Stadium
October 3, 1999^{[X]}	Richmond	United States	Richmond International Raceway Virginia State Fair
October 5, 1999	Jacksonville	United States	Jacksonville Veterans Memorial Coliseum
October 6, 1999	North Charleston	United States	North Charleston Coliseum
October 7, 1999^{[Y]}	Columbia	United States	South Carolina State Fairgrounds
October 8, 1999^{[Z]}	Little Rock	United States	Barton Coliseum
October 11, 1999	Albany	United States	Pepsi Arena
October 12, 1999	University Park	United States	Bryce Jordan Center
October 13, 1999	Rochester	United States	Blue Cross Arena
October 14, 1999^{[AA]}	New York City	United States	The Theater at Madison Square Garden
October 15, 1999	Hershey	United States	Hersheypark Arena
October 16, 1999	Huntington	United States	Huntington Civic Arena
October 17, 1999	Wheeling	United States	Wheeling Civic Center
October 19, 1999	Winston-Salem	United States	LJVM Coliseum
October 20, 1999	Knoxville	United States	Thompson–Boling Arena
October 21, 1999	Lexington	United States	Rupp Arena
October 22, 1999	Evansville	United States	Roberts Municipal Stadium
October 23, 1999	Champaign	United States	Assembly Hall
October 24, 1999	Fort Wayne	United States	Allen County War Memorial Coliseum
October 26, 1999	Moline	United States	The MARK of the Quad Cities
October 27, 1999^{[AB]}	Rosemont	United States	Allstate Arena
October 29, 1999	Mankato	United States	Midwest Wireless Center
October 30, 1999	Bismarck	United States	Bismarck Civic Center
October 31, 1999	Rapid City	United States	Barnett Arena
November 7, 1999^{[AC]}	Hollywood	United States	Young Circle Park
Asia
November 8, 1999	Tokyo	Japan	NHK Hall
November 9, 1999	Tokyo	Japan	NHK Hall
November 10, 1999	Tokyo	Japan	NHK Hall
November 12, 1999	Tokyo	Japan	NHK Hall
November 14, 1999	Taipei	Taiwan	TICC Plenary Hall
November 15, 1999	Taipei	Taiwan	TICC Plenary Hall
November 17, 1999	Manila	Philippines	University of the Philippines Theater
November 18, 1999	Kuala Lumpur	Malaysia	PWTC Plenary Hall
Australia
November 20, 1999	Melbourne	Australia	Festival Hall
November 21, 1999	Melbourne	Australia	Festival Hall
November 23, 1999	Sydney	Australia	Hordern Pavilion
November 24, 1999	Sydney	Australia	Hordern Pavilion
North America
December 10, 1999^{[AD]}	Arlington	United States	Music Mill Amphitheater
December 12, 1999^{[AE]}	Madison	United States	Dane County Coliseum
December 14, 1999	San Juan	Puerto Rico	Anfiteatro Tito Puente
December 16, 1999^{[AF]}	New York City	United States	Madison Square Garden

Festivals and other miscellaneous performances

^{A} KRBE/Enron Earth Day Festival
^{B} Nashville River Stages
^{C} Music Midtown
^{D} Endfest
^{E} Burlington Steamboat Days
^{F} National Cherry Festival
^{G} California Mid-State Fair
^{H} L'Oréal Paris Summer Music Mania '99
^{I} Sioux Empire Fair
^{J} Midland County Fair
^{K} State Fair of West Virginia
^{L} Erie County Fair
^{M} Hunter Mountain Summer Concert Series
^{N} Live at Waterloo Concert Series
^{O} Great New York State Fair
^{P} Michigan State Fair
^{Q} Great Allentown Fair
^{R} Radio Disney Summer Concert Series
^{S} Last Chance Summer Dance
^{T} Allegan County Fair
^{U} York Fair
^{V} Western Fair
^{W} QConcert 1999
^{X} State Fair of Virginia
^{Y} South Carolina State Fair
^{Z} Arkansas State Fair
^{AA} 25th Anniversary Bash
^{AB} B96 Halloween Bash
^{AC} Wing Ding
^{AD} Kissmas Party
^{AE} Z104 Birthday
^{AF} Jingle Ball

Cancellations and rescheduled shows

August 30, 1999	Essex Junction, Vermont	Champlain Valley Exposition	Cancelled. This concert was a part of the Champlain Valley Fair
August 31, 1999	Erie, Pennsylvania	Erie Veterans Memorial Stadium	Rescheduled to September 20, 1999
November 5, 1999	San Juan, Puerto Rico	Anfiteatro Tito Puente	Rescheduled to December 14, 1999
