= Jeff Timmons =

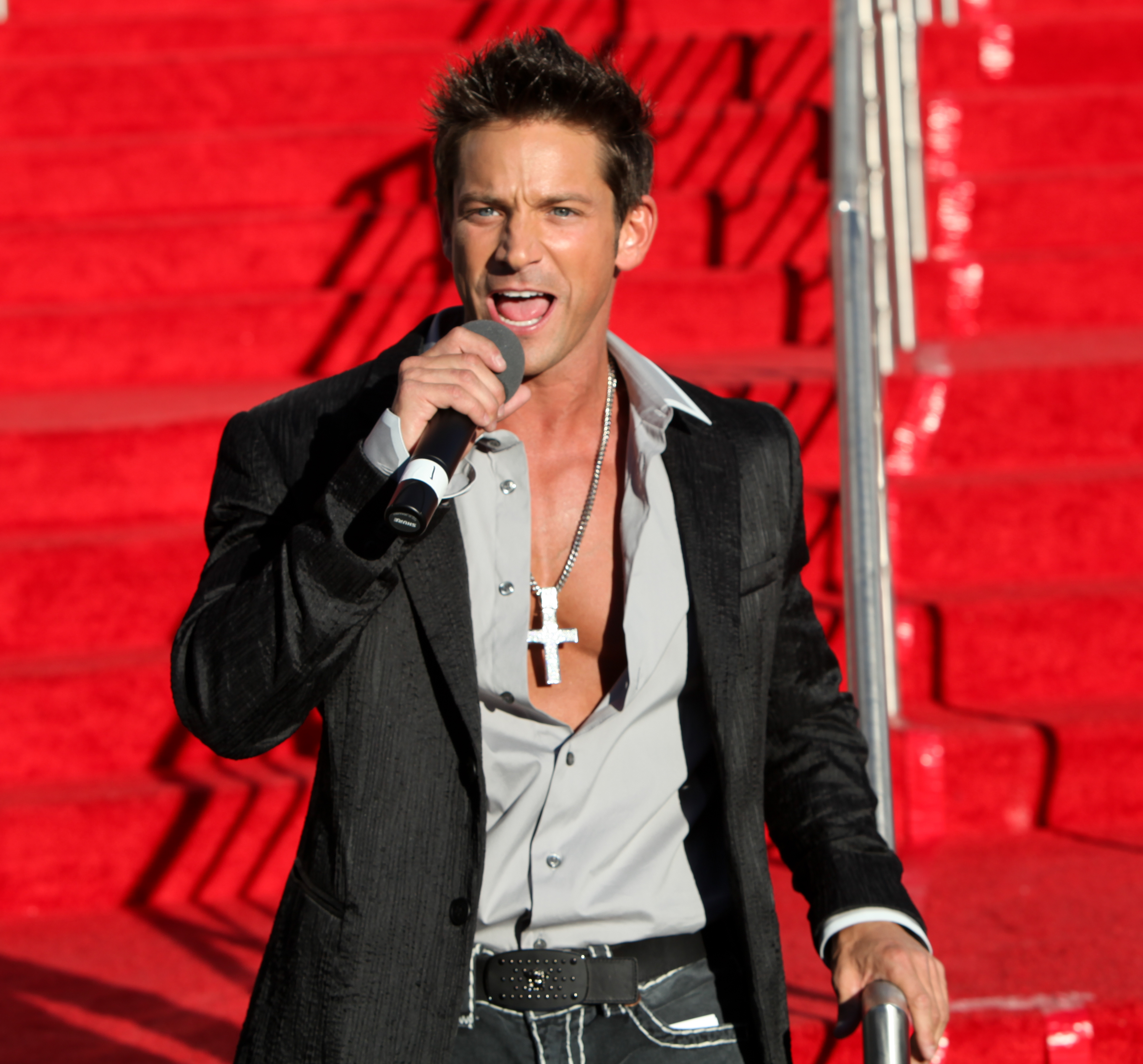
- Timmons at Miss USA 2011

Background information
- Born: Jeffrey Brandon Timmons; April 30, 1973 (age 53); Canton, Ohio, U.S.
- Genres: Pop; hip hop; R&B
- Occupations: Singer; songwriter; actor; record producer
- Years active: 1994–present
- Labels: Motown; Universal; SLG; E1
- Member of: 98 Degrees
- Spouse: Trisha Sperry (1998 - 2006) Amanda Timmons (m. 2010)
- Children: 5

Jeffrey Brandon Timmons (born April 30, 1973) is an American singer, best known as a founding member of the pop group 98 Degrees.

== Career ==
=== Rise of 98 Degrees ===
Timmons was the founding member of 98 Degrees. While studying psychology at Kent State, Timmons decided to move to Los Angeles to pursue a career in entertainment. Although he received several acting jobs (including a commercial for the U.S. Navy), his passion belonged to music and he formed a singing group subsequently. Timmons (along with Justin Jeffre, and brothers Drew Lachey and Nick Lachey) formed independently and were later signed to the Motown label in the mid-1990s. In 1997, they released their first single "Invisible Man" which peaked at number 12 on the Billboard Hot 100. After building popularity with their appearance in the movie Mulan, singing "True to Your Heart" which had them collaborate with Stevie Wonder, their success broke out in late 1998 with their album 98 Degrees and Rising, which included the hit singles "The Hardest Thing", "I Do (Cherish You)" and "Because of You". In 2000, the group released their fourth album Revelation which became their highest-charting album in the Billboard 200. The group took a hiatus in 2002 though they reunited briefly to sing on Nick and Jessica's Christmas Special, a Christmas TV special which featured member Nick Lachey and his then-wife, singer-actress Jessica Simpson.

=== Solo ventures ===
Timmons and the other members of 98 Degrees decided to take a break in 2002 after their world tour. Timmons launched his solo career by touring with Jim Brickman. After positive reviews, he wrote and arranged his first solo album, Whisper That Way, which was released in August 2004 and included the singles Whisper That Way, Better Days and Favorite Star. The album reached #20 on the Adult Contemporary chart.

In September 2005, Timmons rejoined his band to perform at Club Purgatory in the neighborhood of Cincinnati to support bandmate Justin Jeffre in his candidacy for mayor of Cincinnati. In October 2006, Timmons participated in the VH1 reality TV series, Mission: Man Band. This TV show grouped four former pop singers, Timmons, Bryan Abrams of Color Me Badd, Rich Cronin of LFO and Chris Kirkpatrick of *NSYNC to form a new band called Sureshot.

In December 2009, Timmons offered his second album, Emotional High to fans for free via his website. The album contained the single "Emotional High". In 2012, Timmons joined boy bands A1 and Blue in a Southeast Asian world tour and performed both his solo songs and 98 Degrees singles.

In 2016, Timmons joined the team on the Discovery Science television series "Droned" as a Co-Executive Producer. The series was picked up for distribution in 94 countries worldwide.

In October 2018, Timmons enjoyed one of the most successful ventures of his career, teaming up with CBS Big Brother Legend and IMPACT Wrestling Superstar Mr. PEC-Tacular Jessie Godderz to record the single The Girl Is With Me. The song (and accompanying music video) garnered rave reviews and went viral, with prominent features in Entertainment Tonight, People Magazine, Sports Illustrated, Entertainment Weekly, Yahoo, and many more worldwide media outlets, spurring talks of a follow-up single. The song is also scheduled to appear in an upcoming episode of the Amazon Prime series New Dogs, Old Tricks by Gemelli Films.

=== Men of the Strip ===
In 2011, Timmons joined the Chippendales male stripper revue as a singer / performer and MC for a limited run. He was initially skeptical about taking up the offer, but was encouraged by his wife Amanda, and his decision launched a new phase in his career. The success of mixing his performance with the male revue inspired Timmons to propose a more mainstream version with the men performing more than a strip show, but this idea was not supported by Chippendales management. Together with Emmy-nominated choreographer Glenn Douglas Packard and entrepreneur "Money Mike" Foland, Timmons created the "Men of the Strip" revue, a process documented in a 2014 docusoap film of the same name, produced for the E! network. Timmons describes the film as "like Magic Mike with elements of Sex and the City: the guys' personal lives, they're fighting to be the best at what they can do, but at the end of the day, they're family." He also said that the film covers the audition process, "how they navigate being on stage" and that while "[p]eople are going to think they know what male strippers are all about, each of these guys are unique and interesting." The Men of the Strip troupe earned a contract and regular performances at the Tropicana Las Vegas from 2017, as well as touring in the United States and Canada. The Men of the Strip performers are required to sing and dance in shows, at times performing with Timmons who also sometimes acts as MC.

== Personal life ==
Timmons was born April 30, 1973, in Canton, Ohio. He graduated from Massillon Washington High School in Massillon, Ohio, and Malone College, Canton, Ohio, where he played football for a year.

Timmons met his wife Amanda while co-hosting a New Kids on the Block event for Jordan Knight. Timmons describes her as the "brainchild behind the rebirth of my career," referring to the Men of the Strip project, and states "[a]nything that happens forward, if it's a successful endeavor, you can be assured that she's behind it." Timmons has children by his first wife Trisha Sperry and he has spoken about the challenge of explaining the Men of the Strip show to them.

== Discography ==
98 Degrees

- 98° (1997)
- 98° and Rising (1998)
- Revelation (2000)
- 2.0 (2013)

Solo albums

- Whisper That Way (2004)

=== Singles ===
- 2004: "Whisper That Way"
- 2004: "Better Days"
- 2005: "Favorite Star"
- 2009: "Emotional High"
- 2014: "That Girl"
- 2018: "The Girl Is With Me" featuring Mr. PEC-Tacular Jessie Godderz
- 2022: "Lit" featuring Pompey

== Filmography ==
- Michael Jackson: 30th Anniversary Celebration (2001)
- The Screen Savers (9/9/2004)
- Mission Man Band (2007–2008)
- Dead 7 (2016)
- Droned (2016) – Co-Executive Producer
- Glisten and the Merry Mission (2023) – Jinglestar
