= Drew Lachey =

American singer & actor (born 1976)

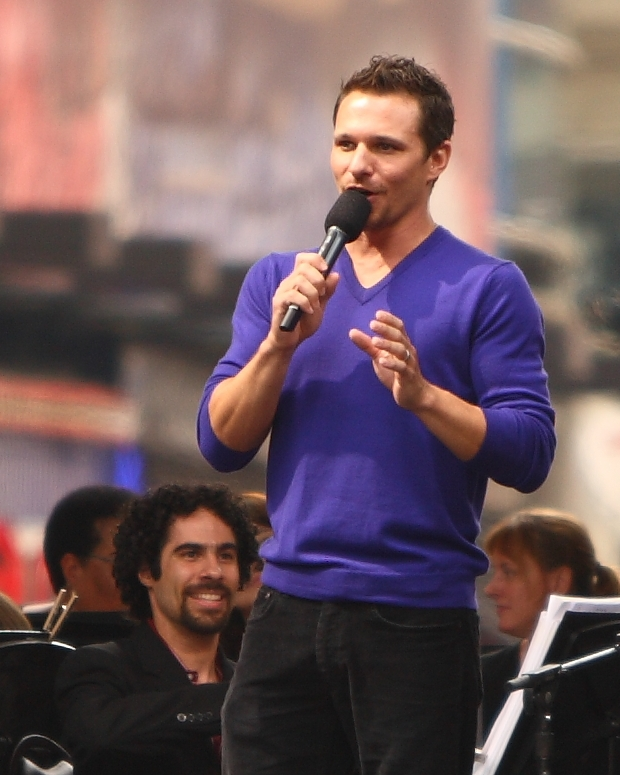
- Lachey at Broadway on Broadway in 2008
- Born: Andrew John Lachey; August 8, 1976 (age 50); Cincinnati, Ohio, U.S.
- Spouse: Lea Dellecave (m. 2000)
- Children: 2
- Relatives: Nick Lachey (brother)
- Musical career
- Genres: Pop; R&B
- Occupations: Singer, actor, emcee
- Years active: 1997–present
- Labels: Motown; Universal

Andrew John Lachey (born August 8, 1976) is an American singer and actor. He is known as a member of 98 Degrees, the winner of the second season of Dancing with the Stars, and the younger brother of Nick Lachey.

== Early years ==
Andrew Lachey was born in Cincinnati, Ohio. He was a combat medic in the United States Army, was an emergency medical technician (EMT) in NYC, worked in a deli, and was a camp counselor at the age of 16. He attended the Clovernook Elementary School in North College Hill, Ohio (a suburb of Cincinnati, Ohio) then attended the School for Creative and Performing Arts (SCPA) in the Cincinnati, Ohio Public School District.

== Career ==
Lachey was a member of the pop group 98 Degrees, alongside his brother, Nick Lachey, and other band members, Justin Jeffre and Jeff Timmons. Since 98 Degrees, Lachey made a guest appearance on Hollywood Squares in 2001, performed on Broadway as Mark Cohen in the musical Rent from January 3 to March 21, 2005, and has also had several guest appearances on Nick's MTV show Newlyweds: Nick and Jessica. In June 2008, Lachey joined the Broadway company of Monty Python's Spamalot as Patsy, the faithful manservant to King Arthur and stayed with the show for three months.

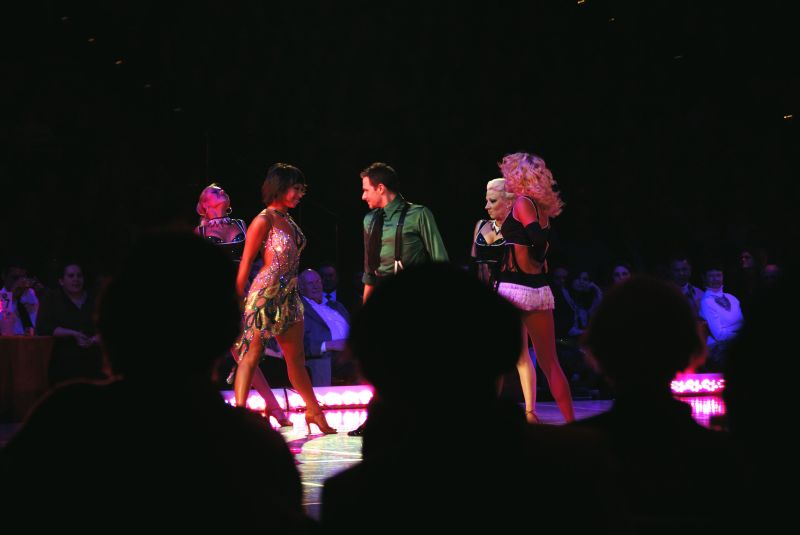
Lachey and Cheryl Burke on Dancing with the Stars

Lachey was a celebrity dancer on the second season of Dancing with the Stars with professional dance partner Cheryl Burke. At the beginning of the sixth week of competition (aired in February 2006), Lachey and Burke earned a perfect score of 30 with their tango. In the eighth and final week, they earned a score of 30 on each of their two dances, the Paso Doble and freestyle, giving them the highest score for the week. On February 26, 2006, they were crowned the champions of Dancing with the Stars.

Lachey co-hosted the 2006 Miss USA pageant with Access Hollywood star Nancy O'Dell. The pageant aired live on NBC from Baltimore, Maryland, on April 21, 2006.

From December 2006 to February 2007, Drew toured both Canada and the United States for the Dancing with the Stars Tour. On the April 17, 2007, results show, Lachey made a surprise appearance to reprise his "Save a Horse (Ride a Cowboy)" freestyle dance with Cheryl Burke. He co-hosted the first 3 weeks of the fifth season of Dancing with the Stars, temporarily replacing Samantha Harris during her maternity leave. He also stepped in for Tom for one episode. When Gloria Estefan had to pull out of the October 16, 2007, results show for personal reasons, Lachey returned to dance a foxtrot with Cheryl.

Drew was featured on the show Overhaulin' when brother Nick worked with Chip Foose to steal and customize Drew's 1967 Ford truck.

Lachey was also presenter of HGTV's spring 2009 series the reality show where five neighboring families competed for the chance to win $250,000 to pay off their mortgage by competing in home-improvement challenges.

In 2010, he played the role of Corny Collins in a production of Hairspray at Pittsburgh's Benedum Center.

Lachey served as guest host for The Price Is Right Live! in Las Vegas in August 2010.

Drew and design partner Sabrina Soto won the celebrity edition of HGTV's Showdown, "Battle of the Bonus Room" shown in July, 2009. The team beat designer Matthew Finlason and celebrity, Kristi Yamaguchi.

Lachey returned to Dancing with the Stars in its fifteenth season as one of the "All-Stars" contestants. This time he was partnered with Anna Trebunskaya. They were the third couple eliminated from the competition.

In May 2019, Lachey competed in the eleventh season of American Ninja Warrior, where he was eliminated in the second obstacle in the Cincinnati city course. His performance aired on July 8, 2019.

== Personal life ==
Lachey married Lea Dellecave on October 14, 2000. They were childhood and high-school sweethearts, and she was the choreographer for 98 Degrees, as well as one of the dancers. Their daughter was born on March 23, 2006, in Los Angeles, California, weighing 7 lb 2 oz (3.2 kg). Their son was born on May 15, 2010, in Cincinnati, Ohio. The two of them also run a Cincinnati-area performing arts day camp.

== Discography ==
98 Degrees

- 98° (1997)
- 98° and Rising (1998)
- Revelation (2000)
- 2.0 (2013)

== Filmography ==
- Spliced (2002) - Brad
- The Comebacks (2007) All American Dad
- Overhaulin season 4
- Hell's Kitchen
- Guess Who's Coming to Christmas (2013) - Dax
- Lachey's: Raising the Bar
- American Ninja (Contestant) 2019
- Sabrina the Teenage Witch (2003) Season 7 Episode 10 "Zeke"

== Broadway ==
- Patsy (2008) Spamalot
- Mark Cohen (2005) Rent

Awards and achievements
Preceded by Kelly Monaco & Alec Mazo	Dancing with the Stars (American TV series) winner Season 2 (Spring 2006 with Cheryl Burke)	Succeeded by Emmitt Smith & Cheryl Burke
