= Whisper That Way =

Studio album by Jeff Timmons
- Released: August 24, 2004
- Recorded: 2003–2004
- Genre: Pop; R&B
- Length: 57:00
- Label: SLG Records
- Producer: Jeff Timmons; David Stenmarck; Byron "Matrix" Ravenell

Jeff Timmons chronology
Whisper That Way (2004)	Emotional High (2009)

Whisper That Way is the debut solo studio album by 98 Degrees founding member Jeff Timmons, released on August 24, 2004. Every song on the album was written and arranged by Timmons. The album was released by SLG Records and is distributed by Warner Music Group in the US.

== Track listing ==
1. "Favorite Star"
2. "Better Days"
3. "Whisper That Way"
4. "Angel Eyes"
5. "Rainbow"
6. "Can't You See"
7. "Thinking of You"
8. "Stay with Me"
9. "Be the One (featuring Jim Brickman)
10. "That Day"
11. "Baby J"
12. "Over & Over" (bonus track)
13. "Better Days (Matrix Mello remix) (bonus track)

== Singles ==
- "Whisper That Way" (Billboard Adult Contemporary #23)
- "Better Days"
- "Favorite Star"
