= Relax (Deetah song) =

1998 single by Deetah

Single by Deetah

from the album Deadly Cha Cha
- B-side: "Take Mines"
- Released: 14 September 1998
- Genre: UK garage (remixes)
- Length: 3:48
- Label: FFRR
- Songwriters: Mark Knopfler; Anders Bagge; Claudia Ogalde
- Producers: Bag; Bloodshy

Deetah singles chronology
| "Relax" (1998) | "El Paraiso Rico" (1999) |

Audio
- "Relax" on YouTube

"Relax" is a song by Chilean-Swedish singer-songwriter Deetah, released as her debut single on 14 September 1998 through FFRR Records. Produced by Anders Bagge and Bloodshy and co-written by Deetah and Bagge, the song contains a prominent sample of "Why Worry" by British rock band Dire Straits, so Mark Knopfler is also credited as a co-writer. "Relax" is included on Deetah's first studio album, Deadly Cha Cha (1999). Upon its release, the song became a top-20 hit in Iceland, Sweden, and the United Kingdom. In the UK, it entered the top 10 on both the Scottish Singles Chart and the UK R&B Singles Chart.

== Background and release ==
"Relax" was written by Anders Bagge and Deetah under her real name, Claudia Ogalde. The track's composition heavily samples the Dire Straits' 1985 song "Why Worry", so Mark Knopfler is also credited as a writer. Bagge, as "Bag", produced the song alongside Swedish DJ Bloodshy. Additional personnel who worked on the song include Mark "Spike" Stent, who mixed the track, and Arnthor, who engineered it. FFRR Records issued "Relax" as a single in the United Kingdom on 14 September 1998 across various formats. These releases contain "Take Mines" and various remixes of "Relax" as B-sides. CD singles were also issued in Sweden, Germany, South Africa, and Australasia. The song was included as the fourth track on Deetah's 1999 debut album, Deadly Cha Cha, and also appeared on the soundtrack to the 1998 slasher film I Still Know What You Did Last Summer.

== Critical reception ==
Before the song's release, British trade paper Music Week reviewed "Relax" on 29 August 1998, giving the song a "side-thumb" rating and noting that the "Why Worry" sample caused an "ill effect". Ziad from Record Mirror gave a positive review for the song's Bump 'n' Flex and M-Dub remixes, calling them "excellent" and giving them a five-out-of-five rating. British columnist James Masterton wrote that the song is a "great example of commercial garage with enough hooks to help it cross over to a pop audience", retrospectively calling its "Why Worry" sample "groundbreaking".

== Chart performance ==
"Relax" debuted at number 11 on the UK Singles Chart on the week beginning 20 September 1998, which would become its peak. It is Deetah's highest- and longest-charting UK single, spending eight weeks in the top 100. On the Scottish Singles Chart, the single entered the top 10, peaking at number 10 on 4 October. It was also a top-10 hit on the UK R&B Singles Chart, reaching number four for two weeks. The single's UK sales alone registered on the Eurochart Hot 100, where it debuted and peaked at number 47 on the chart dated 3 October.

Outside the UK, "Relax" became a top-20 hit in Sweden and Iceland. In Sweden, it debuted at number 39 on the Hitlistan chart on 15 October 1998. Over the next three weeks, the song rose and fell within the top 30, then it jumped to its peak of number 20 on 12 November, becoming Deetah's first of three top-50 hits in Sweden. It remained on the ranking for five more weeks, logging 10 weeks in the top 60 altogether. On Iceland's Íslenski Listinn Topp 40 chart, "Relax" first appeared at number 37 on 9 October 1998. The following week, it rose to its peak of number 13, where it spent two weeks. It remained on the listing for five weeks in total, making its last appearance on 6 November.

== Track listings ==
Swedish CD single

1. "Relax" – 3:48
2. "Relax" (Blacksmith R&B rub—12-inch mix) – 5:11

German and South African CD single

1. "Relax"
2. "Relax" (Blacksmith R&B rub—radio mix)
3. "Relax" (Stargate remix)
4. "Relax" (Bloodshy remix)
5. "Relax" (Blacksmith club mix)

UK 12-inch single 1

A1. "Relax" – 3:48
A2. "Relax" (Bump 'n' Flex mix) – 5:17
B1. "Relax" (Blacksmith R&B rub—12-inch mix) – 5:11
B2. "Relax" (Blacksmith club mix) – 5:37

UK 12-inch single 2

A. "Relax" (Bump 'n' Flex Full Flava Groove)
B. "Relax" (M-Dub Breakbeat mix)

UK CD1 and Australasian CD single

1. "Relax" – 3:48
2. "Relax" (Blacksmith R&B rub—radio mix) – 4:50
3. "Take Mines" – 3:34

UK CD2

1. "Relax" – 3:48
2. "Relax" (Bump 'n' Flex mix) – 5:17
3. "Relax" (Blacksmith club mix) – 5:37

UK cassette single

1. "Relax" – 3:48
2. "Take Mines" – 3:34

== Charts ==
=== Weekly charts ===
| Chart (1998) | Peak position |
|---|---|
| Europe (Eurochart Hot 100) | 47 |
| Iceland (Íslenski Listinn Topp 40) | 13 |
| Scotland Singles (OCC) | 10 |
| Sweden (Sverigetopplistan) | 20 |
| UK Singles (OCC) | 11 |
| UK Hip Hop/R&B (OCC) | 4 |

=== Year-end charts ===
| Chart (1998) | Position |
|---|---|
| UK Singles (OCC) | 133 |
