= Lachey's: Raising the Bar =

- Also known as: Lachey's Bar
- Genre: Reality Television
- Starring: Nick Lachey; Drew Lachey; Vanessa Lachey; Lea Lachey
- Country of origin: United States
- Original language: English
- No. of seasons: 1
- No. of episodes: 10

Production
- Executive producers: Nick Lachey; Drew Lachey
- Production location: Cincinnati, Ohio
- Running time: 22 minutes
- Production companies: Leftfield Pictures; A&E

Original release
- Network: A&E
- Release: July 15 – September 9, 2015

Lachey's: Raising the Bar also known as Lachey's Bar is a docuseries on A&E starring brothers Nick Lachey and Drew Lachey. The show depicts the development of their sports bar and restaurant Lachey's Bar, located in their hometown of Cincinnati, Ohio as well as sharing a look into their home lives with their families. A&E picked up the series for a ten episode order in May 2015, and episodes aired from July 15 to September 9, 2015.

Lachey's Bar closed in February 2018.

== Cast ==
=== Main ===
- Nick Lachey
- Drew Lachey

=== Featured ===
- Vanessa Lachey (Nick's wife)
- Lea Lachey (Drew's wife)

== Episodes ==
No.	Title	Original release date	US viewers (millions)
1	"A Bar is Born"	July 15, 2015	0.598
Nick, Drew, and their friends go on a pub crawl as a means of research. They also begin to build and develop their barspace.
2	"Brothers in Beer"	July 22, 2015	0.462
Nick and Drew discuss their beer selection for Lachey's. They also have a keg party featuring a competition pitting brother against brother as they pick out their own custom beer that they brewed locally. Drew's beer was declared the winner and is featured on the menu.
3	"Tailgate Taste Test"	July 29, 2015	0.620
Nick, Drew, and friends try to decide on a possible menu. They bring their top choices to a Cincinnati Bengals tailgate party in order to narrow down the menu. Also, Nick's wife Vanessa Lachey while pregnant, along with their son Camden, surprise him by being at their home in Cincinnati.
4	"From Boy Bands to Bar Backs"	August 5, 2015	0.773
Since they were challenged by their friends, Nick and Drew, brush up on their bartending skills in hopes of serving drinks on opening. Also, the brothers take part in Oktoberfest Zinzinnati as their Grand Marshals.
5	"Big Bourbon Battle"	August 12, 2015	0.589
While Nick is working in New York, Drew takes a trip with friends to pick out bourbon for their bar. Drew ends up purchasing a $20,000 barrel of bourbon resulting in argument between the brothers, which is later resolved.
6	"Bartender on Board?"	August 19, 2015	0.617
Nick and Drew must hire one last bartender for their bar with the opening only two weeks away. Meanwhile, Drew works on a secret project for the bar as a surprise for Nick resulting in another argument between the brothers, which is again later resolved.
7	"Open for Business"	August 26, 2015	0.348
Nick and Drew are celebrating Lachey's Bar official opening night with a premiere party and a key from the mayor, but the night isn't free of complications.
8	"Mom's the Word"	September 2, 2015	0.484
While Nick is home in LA after the birth of his newborn daughter, Brooklyn, Drew is at the bar making sure things are running smoothly. Meanwhile, Nick and Drew's mother, Cate, insists on helping out her sons by greeting customers and waiting tables for a night. During that time, Lachey's bar has its very first food critic, who leaves a positive review.
9	"Businessmen, Babies, and Bachelorettes"	September 9, 2015	0.387
Nick and Drew accidentally book two different private parties, and they attempt to keep both sets of customers happy during their visits.
10	"In Cincy to Stay?"	September 9, 2015	0.331
Nick and Drew offer to host a weekly local radio show at the bar. Meanwhile, Nick considers relocating his entire family to Cincinnati permanently.

== Broadcast ==
Internationally, the series premiered in Australia on November 4, 2015 on A&E Australia.
