= Revelation (98 Degrees album) =

Studio album by 98 Degrees
- Released: September 26, 2000
- Recorded: February–July 2000
- Genre: Pop; R&B
- Length: 46:17
- Label: Universal
- Producer: Bruce Carbone; Paris D'Jon; George Jackson

98 Degrees chronology
This Christmas (1999)	Revelation (2000)	The Collection (2002)

Singles from Revelation
- 1. "Give Me Just One Night (Una Noche)" Released: July 24, 2000; 2. "My Everything" Released: November 6, 2000

Professional ratings
Aggregate scores
Source	Rating
Metacritic	57/100
Review scores
Source	Rating
AllMusic	3/5 stars
Billboard	favorable
Entertainment Weekly	C
Rolling Stone	2.5/5 stars
Wall of Sound	52/100

Revelation is the fourth studio album by American boy band 98 Degrees, released on September 26, 2000. The album features the hit single "Give Me Just One Night (Una Noche)", which became their highest charting single as a lead artist, peaking at two on the Billboard Hot 100, staying there for two consecutive weeks. The album debuted at number two on the Billboard 200, selling 276,343 copies in its first week, making Revelation the band's best charting album and highest first-week sales on the Billboard 200.

According to Nielsen SoundScan, the album sold over 2.5 million copies in the United States alone. At that time, "Give Me Just One Night (Una Noche)" became the most added Top 40 single in history with 170 adds on radio in its initial week, allowing the song to debut strongly at number two on the Billboard Hot 100, becoming the then-highest-charting single in its debut week by a boy band.

== Track listing ==
Standard edition
No.	Title	Writer(s)	Producer(s)	Length
1.	"Give Me Just One Night (Una Noche)" (Lead vocals: Nick Lachey and Jeff Timmons)	Anders Bagge; Arnthor Birgisson; Claudia Ogalde	Bag & Arnthor	3:25
2.	"The Way You Want Me To" (Lead vocal: Nick Lachey)	Nick Lachey; Andrew Lachey; Bagge; Birgisson	Bag & Arnthor	3:29
3.	"Stay the Night" (Lead vocals: Nick Lachey and Jeff Timmons)	Bagge; Birgisson; Reed Vertelney	Bag & Arnthor	3:52
4.	"Yesterday's Letter" (Lead vocals: Drew Lachey, Nick Lachey, and Jeff Timmons)	A. Lachey; Jeffrey Timmons; Bagge; Birgisson	Bag & Arnthor	4:21
5.	"He'll Never Be (What I Used to Be to You)" (Lead vocals: Nick Lachey and Jeff Timmons; spoken vocal: Justin Jeffre)	Timmons; Carl Sturken, Evan Rogers	Sturken; Rogers	4:13
6.	"I'll Give It All (Interlude)" (Lead vocals: 98 Degrees)	Devon Biere		0:39
7.	"My Everything" (Lead vocals: Nick Lachey and Drew Lachey)	N. Lachey; Bagge; Birgisson; Justin Jeffre	Bag & Arnthor	3:51
8.	"You Should Be Mine" (Lead vocals: Nick Lachey and Jeff Timmons; spoken vocals: Justin Jeffre)	N. Lachey; Paul Cruz; Rhett Lawrence	Lawrence	3:21
9.	"You Don't Know" (Lead vocals: Nick Lachey and Jeff Timmons)	N. Lachey; Louis Biancaniello; Sam Watters	Biancaniello; Watters	4:13
10.	"Dizzy" (Lead vocals: Drew Lachey and Nick Lachey; rap: Justin Jeffre)	N. Lachey; D. Lachey; Lawrence	Lawrence	3:16
11.	"The Way You Do" (Lead vocals: Drew Lachey and Nick Lachey)	A. Lachey; Jim Kimball; Tommy Lee James	Bag & Arnthor	4:05
12.	"Always You and I"	N. Lachey; Lawrence	Lawrence	3:52
13.	"Never Giving Up"	Bagge; Birgisson; Jeffre; Timmons	Bag & Arnthor	3:59

US re-release bonus track
No.	Title	Writer(s)	Producer(s)	Length
14.	"Can You Imagine"	N. Lachey; Gary Baker; Steven Diamond	Baker; 98 Degrees	4:42

US & Canadian re-release bonus track
No.	Title	Writer(s)	Producer(s)	Length
14.	"Chance to Love You More"	N. Lachey; Bagge; Birgisson	Bag & Arnthor	4:52

Japanese version bonus tracks
No.	Title	Writer(s)	Producer(s)	Length
14.	"Never Let Go"	Bagge; Birgisson; Diamond	Bag & Arnthor
15.	"Can You Imagine"	N. Lachey; Baker; Diamond	Baker; 98 Degrees

== Charts ==
=== Weekly charts ===
Chart (2000)	Peak position
Australian Albums (ARIA)	40
Canadian Albums (RPM)	2
Japanese Albums (Oricon)	26
Singapore Albums (SPVA)	3
US Billboard 200	2

=== Year-end charts ===
Chart (2000)	Position
Canadian Albums (Nielsen SoundScan)	83
US Billboard 200	102
Chart (2001)	Position
US Billboard 200	104

== Sales and certifications ==
Region	Certification	Certified units/sales
Canada (Music Canada)	Platinum	100,000^{^}
South Korea	—	11,684
United States (RIAA)	2× Platinum	2,000,000^{^}
^{^} Shipments figures based on certification alone.
