= Deetah =

- Born: Claudia Ogalde; 29 February 1976 (age 50); Chile
- Genres: Hip hop, R&B, dance, pop
- Occupations: Rapper, singer, songwriter
- Instrument: Vocals
- Label: FFRR
- Formerly of: Goldmine

Claudia Ogalde (born 29 February 1976), better known as Deetah, is a singer, songwriter and rapper.

Deetah's name is a shortening of a childhood nickname, "Claudita". She was born in Chile but moved to Stockholm at age six when her family fled the country's political turmoil. In the mid-1990s, she launched a singing career with the group Goldmine and appeared on tracks by Tupac Shakur, The Notorious B.I.G., and Ophélie Winter. Her debut solo album Deadly Cha Cha was released in 1998. The album yielded two top 40 hits on the UK Singles Chart: the song "Relax", which samples Dire Straits' "Why Worry", reached No. 11, and "El Paraiso Rico", which samples Madonna's "La Isla Bonita", peaked at No. 39. She also appeared on Richard Blackwood's hit single, "1-2-3-4 Get with the Wicked".

As a songwriter, Deetah has co-written songs such as 98 Degrees' "Give Me Just One Night (Una Noche)", Mýa's "Again & Again" and Noora Noor's "Speaker Phone".

== Discography ==
=== Albums ===
- 1999: Deadly Cha Cha

=== Singles ===
- 1998: "Relax" – UK No. 11
- 1999: "El Paraiso Rico" – UK No. 39
- 1999: "Honey Lollipop"
- 2000: "1.2.3.4 Get with the Wicked" (Richard Blackwood featuring Deetah) – UK No. 10
