= 2.0 (98 Degrees album) =

Studio album by 98 Degrees
- Released: May 7, 2013
- Genre: Pop
- Length: 44:47
- Label: eOne Music
- Producers: Battleroy; Jo Blaq; Diego & Anzo; Andrew Goldstein; Justin Gray; Chuck Harmony; Andre Harris; Sean Hurley; Kenneth Karlin; Emanuel Kiriakou; Brent Paschke; Sheppard Solomon; Soulshock; Trevor Wesley

98 Degrees chronology
The Collection (2002)	2.0 (2013)	Let It Snow (2017)

Singles from 2.0
- 1. "Microphone" Released: April 2, 2013; 2. "Impossible Things" Released: June 4, 2013

Professional ratings
Review scores
Source	Rating
AllMusic	3/5 stars

2.0 is the fifth studio album by American boy band 98 Degrees. The album was released on May 7, 2013, through eOne Music. It is their first studio album in thirteen years following Revelation (2000), The album was released by eOne Music, making it their first released through an independent record label rather than a major label like Motown or Universal Records. 2.0 debuted at number 65 on the Billboard 200, and number 12 on the Independent Album chart becoming the group's lowest-charting album since their 1997 debut album, 98 Degrees, which debuted at number 145.

== Track listing ==
No.	Title	Writer(s)	Producer(s)	Length
1.	"Microphone"	Trevor Hotchkiss, Sanyika Street, Brent Paschke, Colton Fisher, Jason Rabinowitz	Trevor Wesley, Brent Paschke	3:16
2.	"Girls Night Out"	Emanuel Kiriakou, Claude Kelly	Emanuel Kiriakou, Andrew Goldstein	3:41
3.	"Lonely"	Shaffer Smith, Chuck Harmony	Chuck Harmony	3:27
4.	"Can't Get Enough"	Paschke, Bruce Boniface, Kara DioGuardi	Brent Paschke	3:53
5.	"Impossible Things"	Justin Gray, Sheppard Solomon, Priya Jayaram Geddis	Justin Gray, Sheppard Solomon	3:42
6.	"Hush, Hush"	Jamie Houston, Eric Brengle, Michael Hall	Jamie Houston	3:42
7.	"No Part of You"	Carsten Schack, Diego Cordoba, Steven Anzo, Alexander "Xplicit" Izquierdo, Clarence Coffee Jr.	Soulshock, Diego & Anzo (co.)	3:44
8.	"Agree on Goodbye"	Thomas Lumpkins, Kelly Lumpkins, Roy Battle	Battleroy	2:55
9.	"Let Go of My Heart"	Steven Lee Olsen	Battleroy	4:05
10.	"Ayo"	Schack, Sean Hurley, Kelly	Soulshock, Sean Hurley (co.)	3:17
11.	"Take the Long Way Home"	Schack, Kenneth Karlin, Philip Martin Lawrence, Bruno Mars	Soulshock & Karlin	3:56
12.	"Because of You" (acoustic) (bonus)	Anders Bagge, Arnthor Birgisson, Christian Karlsson, Patrick Tucker	Andre Harris, Jo Blaq	3:19
13.	"Invisible Man" (acoustic) (bonus)	Stephen Alan Kipner, Sean Syed Hosein, Dane Anthony de Villier	Andre Harris, Jo Blaq	3:21

== Charts ==
Chart (2013)	Peak position
US Billboard 200	65
