= Summer MixTape Festival =

Music festival in Pennsylvania, United States

Summer Mixtape Festival
- Ad for 2012 festival
- Locations: Hersheypark Stadium; Hershey, Pennsylvania
- Years active: 2012-13; 2015-16
- Founders: Live Nation
- Website: Festival Website

The Summer Mixtape Festival (simply known as the Mixtape Festival) was a major summer music festival launched in summer 2012. The first festival was held in Hersheypark Stadium in Hershey, Pennsylvania on August 17–18, 2012, featuring a number of icons and mainstream headliners such as New Kids on the Block, Backstreet Boys, Kelly Clarkson, The Wanted, The Fray, and LL Cool J. The festival featured two stages over two days.

The festival also featured fan events (for example Backstreet Boys' barbecue event "BSBBQ"), interactive exhibits, food trucks, celebrity and special guest appearances, and a spa oasis.

== 2012 ==
The Wanted joined New Kids on the Block on stage in a performance of "Glad You Came" on August 17, 2012, and NKOTBSB brought out 98 Degrees to greet the crowd in the middle of their show on August 18, 2012. NKOTBSB also revealed that it was the last time they would perform together as they were going their separate ways after the festival. There was an additional event on August 19, 2012, called "Rock n' Jock". It's a softball game featuring New Kids on the Block versus Backstreet Boys in Harrisburg, Pennsylvania.

=== Line-up ===
Day 1—August 17

- Kelly Clarkson
- Carolina Liar
- The Fray
- DJ Cheapshot
- Aaron Carter
- New Kids on the Block
- Steel Panther
- DJ Pauly D

Day 2—August 18

- NKOTBSB
- LL Cool J featuring DJ Z-Trip
- New Kids on the Block
- The Wanted
- The Dan Band
- The Ready Set
- Carly Rae Jepsen
- 98 Degrees

== 2013 ==
Day 1—July 26

- Train
- The Script
- OneRepublic
- Rev Run with DJ Ruckus
- Gavin DeGraw
- Hanson
- Serena Ryder

Day 2—July 27

- New Kids on the Block
- Jonas Brothers
- TLC
- Boyz II Men
- Benji Madden
- Emblem3
- MKTO

== 2015 ==
June 27

- New Kids on the Block
- TLC
- Nelly
- Vanilla Ice
- Salt-N-Pepa
- Sugar Ray

== 2016 ==
August 6

- New Kids on the Block
- Paula Abdul
- Boyz II Men
- 98 Degrees
- O-Town
- Dream
- Ryan Cabrera
