= This Christmas (98 Degrees album) =

Studio album by 98 Degrees
- Released: October 19, 1999
- Genres: Christmas; pop; R&B
- Length: 39:45
- Labels: Universal; Motown (Japan only)

98 Degrees chronology
98 Degrees and Rising (1998)	This Christmas (1999)	Revelation (2000)

Singles from This Christmas
- 1. "This Gift" Released: November 15, 1999

Professional ratings
Review scores
Source	Rating
Allmusic	3/5 stars
Entertainment Weekly	C

This Christmas is the third album (and first Christmas album) by 98 Degrees. The album sold over 1 million copies in the US alone and spawned the Hot 100 hit single "This Gift".

== Track listing ==
1. "If Every Day Could Be Christmas" – 5:04
2. "God Rest You Merry, Gentlemen" – 4:36
3. "The Christmas Song" – 4:08
4. "I'll Be Home for Christmas" – 2:04
5. "O Holy Night" – 3:20
6. "This Gift" – 4:08
7. "The Little Drummer Boy" – 3:25
8. "Christmas Wish" – 3:49
9. "Silent Night" – 3:09
10. "Ave Maria (Bach/Gounod)" – 1:56
11. "This Gift" (Pop Version) – 4:09

== Charts ==
=== Weekly charts ===
Chart (1999)	Peak position
US Billboard 200	27
US Top Holiday Albums (Billboard)	2

=== Year-end charts ===
Chart (2000)	Position
US Billboard 200	146

== Certifications ==
Region	Certification	Certified units/sales
United States (RIAA)	Platinum	1,000,000^{^}
^{^} Shipments figures based on certification alone.
