= 98 Degrees =

American boy band

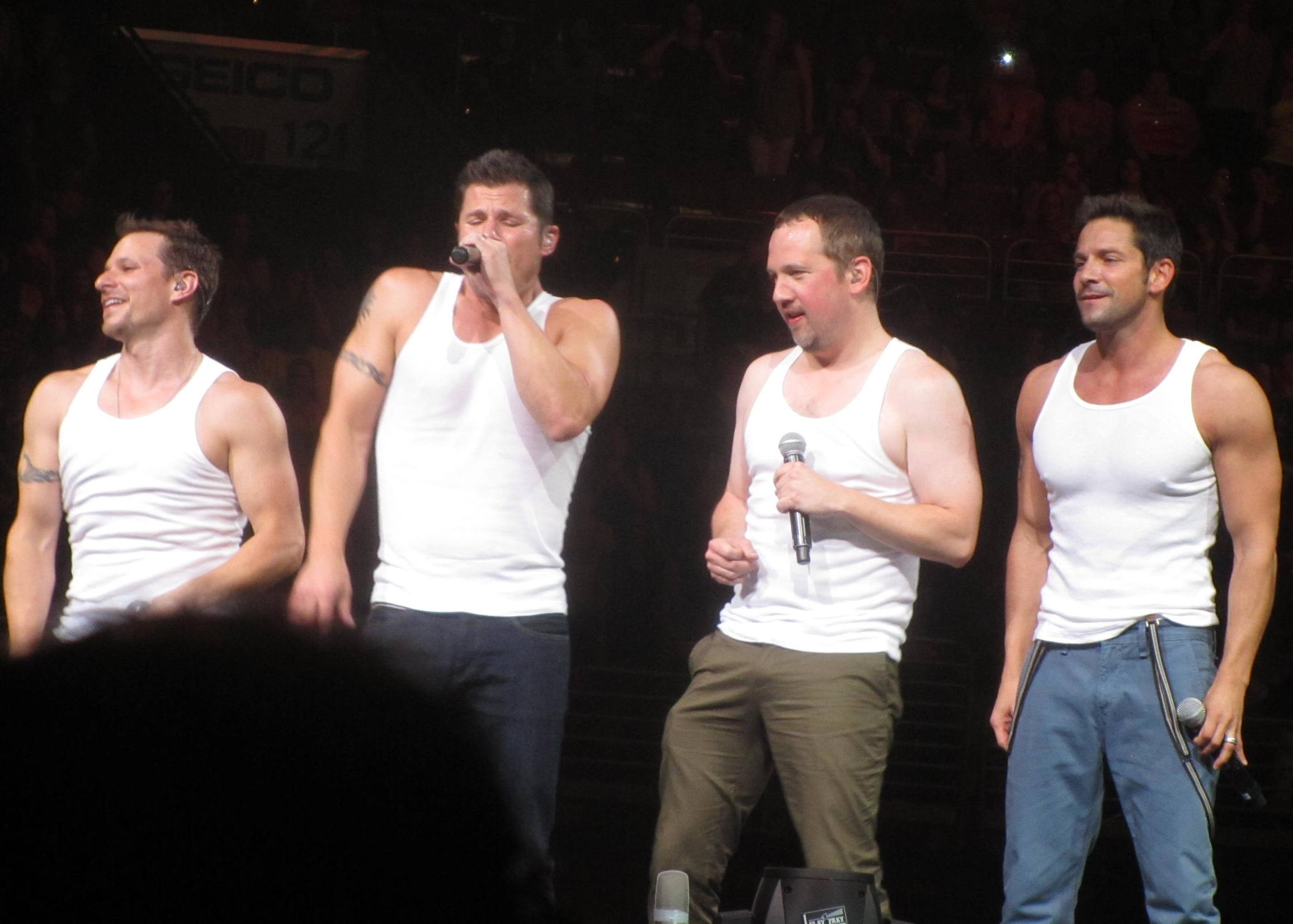
- 98 Degrees performing on The Package Tour in 2013.

Background information
- Also known as: 98°
- Origin: Los Angeles, California, U.S.
- Genres: Pop; R&B
- Years active: 1996–2002; 2012–present
- Labels: Motown; Universal; Entertainment One; Hollywood; SONGZBank
- Members: Nick Lachey; Jeff Timmons; Justin Jeffre; Drew Lachey
- Past members: Jonathan Lippman
- Website: 98degrees.com

98 Degrees (stylized as 98°) is an American pop and R&B boy band consisting of brothers Nick and Drew Lachey, Jeff Timmons, and Justin Jeffre.

The group was started independently by Jeff Timmons in Los Angeles, California, although all of its members originate from Ohio. They were later picked up by a record label, rather than being assembled by a label or a producer. Between late 1997 and 2000, the group achieved 7 top 40 singles on the Billboard U.S. Hot 100 chart, with their debut single "Invisible Man" peaking at No. 12, and 1999's pop/R&B cover of the country ballad "I Do (Cherish You)" peaking at No. 13. The group charted in the U.S. top five with "Give Me Just One Night (Una Noche)", "Because of You", "The Hardest Thing", and "Thank God I Found You"—the latter as a guest artist backing Mariah Carey to give 98 Degrees their only number-one song, which earned a Grammy Award nomination for Best Pop Collaboration with Vocals. They have sold over 15 million records worldwide.

Beginning with an August 2012 performance at the Mixtape Festival in Hershey, Pennsylvania, the group reunited and continues to record new music.

== History ==
=== Formation ===
The founding members of 98 Degrees met after Massillon, Ohio native Jeff Timmons decided to quit college and pursue a music career with best friend Jeremy Volk. He studied psychology at Kent State University in his home state of Ohio, and planned on a career playing football in the NFL. In 1995 he sang at a college party with three friends and received a positive reaction from the female audience about his voice. The following day he left college and headed out to Los Angeles, California. "It was a pretty hasty decision, looking back, but I was young and dumb. Sometimes ignorance is bliss," he said in 2004. He met a former student of the Cincinnati School for Creative and Performing Arts who passed his name on to another graduate, Nick Lachey, who was attending Miami (of Ohio) University to study sports medicine. Lachey flew to Los Angeles and, after hitting it off, decided to form an R&B group. Lachey suggested inviting one of his friends, Justin Jeffre, to join them. Jeffre, a history student at University of Cincinnati, had attended SCPA with Lachey and they had performed together before in various outfits such as a barbershop quartet at the Kings Island amusement park and a cover band. The final member to join the band was Lachey's younger brother Drew, who was working in New York City as an emergency medical technician, as a replacement for founding member Jonathan Lippman.

After rejecting a series of names (including Just Us and Next Issue), upon the suggestion by their manager Paris D'Jon, they decided on "98 Degrees" describing body temperature and their music.

=== Signing to Motown records ===
Taking a series of jobs including landscaping, working as club security officers and delivering take-out food, the band refined its harmonies and presentation, looking to groups such as Boyz II Men, Take 6, and Jodeci for inspiration. The new group also made the rounds of auditions in Los Angeles and gradually built up its contacts in the music industry. The group's wait for a manager and a recording contract did not take long, as they seized an opportunity to perform during a radio broadcast of a Boyz II Men concert, which they attended in the hope of passing a demo tape to the band. They were discovered by music manager Paris D'Jon, who was co-managing Montell Jordan at the time.

Just before the group signed their deal, founding member Jonathan Lippman departed the group due to his religious beliefs; he later went on to form CCM group True Vibe.

The group's emergence at a time when teen-oriented acts like the Spice Girls, the Backstreet Boys and NSYNC were just hitting the top of the charts around the world compelled them to differentiate themselves from the mere "boy band" status that they derided. From the start, they emphasized that they wrote much of their own material, which reflected R&B influences rather than mainstream pop roots. Drew Lachey commented in an interview with the Chicago Tribune in April 1999, "Anybody who has listened to Backstreet [Boys]'s album, our album and *NSYNC's album will definitely see that there are major differences musically between groups, not to mention the fact that we were signed to Motown, which gives us a little more credibility as far as R&B and soul music goes. Not to mention that we’ve been influenced by more of those type of artists." Directly referring to NSYNC and the Backstreet Boys, he added, "We are singers, songwriters, and producers all in one, not just one of those manufactured pop groups that is put together as a marketing scheme. We are actually in this for the music, which is our first love. That is the major difference."

=== 1997: First album ===
With their debut single "Invisible Man", which peaked at No. 12 on the Billboard Hot 100, achieving gold-record status after its June 1997 release, 98 Degrees was off to a promising start. Although critical response to the group's self-titled debut album was mixed, a Billboard review of their first single noted their vocal abilities, and the addition of a new track helped to keep the band in the public eye. The group also toured extensively, including concert dates in Asia. They also opened for several dates of Janet Jackson's Velvet Rope Tour, exposing them to a wider audience.

=== 1998-1999: Breakthrough ===
After building popularity with their appearance in the animated Disney movie Mulan, and singing "True to Your Heart", a duet with labelmate Stevie Wonder, their album 98 Degrees and Rising was released in October 1998 and became the group's breakthrough album, eventually going 4× platinum. Production credits included Atlanta-based producer and Babyface co-writing partner Daryl Simmons, while musician credits featured Atlanta-based session musician and former Earth, Wind & Fire guitarist Dick Smith. After the album's release, 98 Degrees left Motown for its parent company, Universal Records.

The band's first major hit "Because of You" reached number three on the U.S. Hot 100 and number five on the Canadian Singles Chart, and also went platinum. "The Hardest Thing" followed the success by reaching No. 5 on the Billboard Hot 100 and was certified gold.

In 1999, 98 Degrees released their Christmas album This Christmas, which spawned the Canadian top 40 single "This Gift". Within a month after its release the album was certified platinum. The group appeared as featured guests on Amy Grant's 1999 CBS Christmas special, A Christmas to Remember. Nick Lachey was featured on singer Jessica Simpson's debut album Sweet Kisses on the track "Where You Are", which was released as a single and reached the top 40 in Canada but missed the top 40 in the US. The group appeared in the album called Jesus: The Epic Mini Series with their song "The Love That You've Been Looking For".

=== 2000–2002: Revelation ===
The group scored a Billboard Hot 100 No. 1 hit in the U.S. with the single "Thank God I Found You", a collaboration with Mariah Carey and Joe. The single went gold, selling 700,000 copies. It stayed at No. 1 on the Hot 100 for one week and the top 200 singles sales chart for 51 weeks. The single went to the top 10 in the UK charts and the group also received a Grammy Award nomination for Best Pop Collaboration with Vocals for the same song.

In the summer of 2000, 98 Degrees released "Give Me Just One Night (Una Noche)", the first single off their upcoming album Revelation; the single went to No. 2 on the Billboard Hot 100 and was certified gold. In September 2000, Revelation was released, peaking at No. 2 on the Billboard 200 and being certified 2× Platinum. The band's next singles from that album were "My Everything" and "The Way You Want Me To", the former reaching the Top 40.

In September 2001, the band appeared at Madison Square Garden alongside Luther Vandross and Usher singing Michael Jackson's hit song "Man in the Mirror". The performance was part of a show to celebrate Michael Jackson's 30 years as a solo artist.

In 2002, 98 Degrees released a compilation album called The Collection, with the new single "Why (Are We Still Friends)". At that point the group had sold over 10 million records and released 12 singles.

=== 2003–2012: Hiatus ===
In 2003, the group went on hiatus. At the time, Drew Lachey stated that 98 Degrees had not broken up. During the hiatus, Drew and his wife had their first daughter shortly after he won the second season of Dancing with the Stars. Nick Lachey married Jessica Simpson in October 2002 and released two solo albums, SoulO and What's Left of Me, with the latter being released around the time of his divorce from Simpson in 2006. Timmons released the solo album Whisper That Way and participated in the VH1 reality TV series, Mission Man Band. Jeffre ran for mayor of Cincinnati, Ohio, and worked on independent media projects.

The band reunited in 2004 to perform on Nick & Jessica's Family Christmas TV special. In September 2005, 98 Degrees performed at Club Purgatory in Over-the-Rhine to support Jeffre in his candidacy for mayor of Cincinnati.

=== 2012–present: Reunion, 2.0 and Let It Snow ===
On June 20, 2012, Nick and Drew Lachey announced on Ryan Seacrest that the group would reunite for a one-time performance at Mixtape Festival in Hershey, PA in August. The group also performed at The Today Show on August 17.

In an interview with Rolling Stone on July 26, 2012, Drew Lachey revealed that a week before, the group had their first rehearsal in over a decade. He also explained the group decided to come back together because they were all at that place in their lives where they felt comfortable committing to being in a group again, and they also felt the timing was right because the pop music genre has come back around. "Music is very cyclical. You go through rock stages, R&B stages, rap stages... It's an uphill battle if you try and do pop during a rap stage," says Lachey. Regarding the group's future, he said at this time, they currently have no plan beyond their performances at The Today Show and the Mixtape Festival. However, in September 2012, he revealed the group was going to go back into the studio to record a new album in October.

On January 22, 2013, the group appeared on The View along with New Kids on the Block and Boyz II Men to announce their joint tour would take place in summer 2013. This tour is named "The Package" and the 12 members on tour (Boyz II Men with 3 members, NKOTB with 5 members and 98 Degrees with 4 members) jokingly refer to themselves as "The Dirty Dozen". The North American tour began on May 28, 2013. The band also performed a song during the season finale of NBC's The Sing-Off, which Nick Lachey hosts, on December 23, 2013.

The band released their new album, 2.0, their first studio album in 13 years, on May 7, 2013.

In summer 2016, they regrouped again to headline the My2K Tour, their first headlining tour in 15 years. They were supported by O-Town, Ryan Cabrera, and Dream, putting together a bill of pop acts that were first popular in the late 1990s and early 2000s at larger venues.

In 2017, they returned to Universal Music and put out their second Christmas album, Let it Snow, because of their 20th anniversary. They promoted it with a series of concerts across the United States called the "At Christmas Tour".

On November 23, 2017, the band made a 90-second musical appearance in Macy's Thanksgiving Day Parade, performed in New York City.

On May 21, 2018, the band made a musical appearance at Miss USA, singing "The Hardest Thing" and "I Do", as the three final girls did their last walk on the stage.

From October 15 to October 16, 2018, 98 Degrees appeared at Epcot at Walt Disney World as part of the Eat To The Beat concert series during the annual Food and Wine Festival.

On July 9, 2021, the band released a new single titled "Where Do You Want To Go". They joined Canadian country singer Brett Kissel on the single "Ain't the Same" in April 2022.

== Discography ==
Studio albums

- 98° (1997)
- 98° and Rising (1998)
- This Christmas (1999)
- Revelation (2000)
- 2.0 (2013)
- Let It Snow (2017)
- Full Circle (2025)

== Tours ==
Headlining

- Heat It Up Tour (1999)
- Revelation Tour (2001)
- My2K Tour (2016)
- 98° at Christmas Tour (2017, 2018)
- An Evening with 98 Degrees (2019-20)
- 25th Anniversary Tour (2023)
- 2024 U.S. Tour (2024)

Co-headlining

- All That! Music and More Festival (1999) (with Monica, Aaron Carter, B*Witched, 3rd Storee, Tatyana Ali and No Authority)
- The Package Tour (2013) (with New Kids on the Block and Boyz II Men)

== Awards and nominations ==
=== Grammy Awards ===
Year	Nominee / work	Award	Result
2000	"Thank God I Found You" (with Mariah Carey & Joe)	Best Pop Collaboration with Vocals	Nominated

=== Billboard Music Awards ===
Year	Nominee / work	Award	Result
1999	98°	Top Pop Artist - Duo/Group	Nominated

=== Billboard Music Video Awards ===
Year	Nominee / work	Award	Result	Ref.
1999	"The Hardest Thing"	Best Jazz/AC Clip	Nominated	
1999	"The Hardest Thing"	Best New Artist Clip - Jazz/AC	Nominated	
1999	"I Do (Cherish You)"	Best New Artist Clip - Pop	Nominated	

=== Blockbuster Entertainment Awards ===
Year	Nominee / work	Award	Result	Ref.
2000	98 Degrees and Rising	Favorite Group - Pop	Nominated	
2001	Revelation	Favorite Group - Pop	Nominated	

=== Kids' Choice Awards ===
Year	Nominee / work	Award	Result
2000	98°	Favorite Music Group	Nominated

=== Online Music Awards ===
Year	Nominee / work	Award	Result	Ref.
1999	pagina.de/98degrees	Best Pop Fansite	Nominated	
1999	98°	Favorite Pop Group	Nominated	
2000	98°	Favorite Group	Nominated	

=== Teen Choice Awards ===
Year	Nominee / work	Award	Result
1999	98°	Choice Music: Breakout Artist	Won
1999	98°	Choice Music Group	Nominated
1999	"Because of You"	Choice Music: Love Song	Nominated
2000	"Thank God I Found You" (with Mariah Carey & Joe)	Choice Music: Love Song	Nominated
2000	98°	Choice Music Group	Nominated
2001	98°	Choice Music Group	Nominated
