= True to Your Heart =

1998 single by 98 Degrees and Stevie Wonder

Single by 98 Degrees and Stevie Wonder

from the album Mulan: An Original Walt Disney Records Soundtrack and 98 Degrees and Rising
- B-side: "Was It Something I Didn't Say"
- Released: May 26, 1998
- Length: 4:15
- Label: Walt Disney; Hollywood; Motown
- Composer: Matthew Wilder
- Lyricist: David Zippel
- Producer: Matthew Wilder

98 Degrees singles chronology
"Was It Something I Didn't Say" (1998)	"True to Your Heart" (1998)	"Because of You" (1998)

Stevie Wonder singles chronology
"How Come, How Long" (1997)	"True to Your Heart" (1998)	"Signed, Sealed, Delivered I'm Yours" (2003)

Audio video
- "True to Your Heart" on YouTube

"True to Your Heart" is a song from the Disney's 1998 animated film Mulan, performed by American boy band 98 Degrees and American singer-songwriter Stevie Wonder. Written by Matthew Wilder and David Zippel for the film's closing credits, it was the first of two singles from its soundtrack. It was also included on the band's second album, 98 Degrees and Rising. Critics wrote that the song is vibrant but ultimately seems out of place in the Mulan film and soundtrack. A cover version by Raven-Symoné was recorded for the soundtrack of the 2004 film Ella Enchanted.

== Production ==
Matthew Wilder & David Zippel had written the song originally for Hanson, but the deal eventually fell through. They were subsequently asked to alter the song to give it a "Stevie Wonder feel". The writers previously had the opportunity to work with famous performers like dubbing artist Marni Nixon, though were "excited and astonished" to work with Wonder. Wilder recalled: "While sitting in the studio waiting for Wonder's arrival, some guy walks in and sets up a keyboard and then walks out with saying a word. After several hours passed, Wonder finally arrived. I peaked my head out into the hallway in time to see him floating down this long hallway in this floor-length dashiki. He looked like an African god." Wilder and Zippel didn't have a clear collaboration in mind when calling Wonder into the studio. Initially they had asked him to play harmonica on the track. Wonder said that he liked the song, describing it as "a song I would've written back in the '70s and I’m into it" and offered to sing on it.

Meanwhile, 98 Degrees had recently released their debut album with just one single "Invisible Man" and the album failed to chart. The band's next creative step following this was to explore the international markets of Asia and Europe and record "True to Your Heart" with Stevie Wonder for Disney's Mulan soundtrack which led them to wider recognition.

== Release ==
The song was released as the first single off the soundtrack and was nominated for the 1999 Grammy Awards in the category of Best Song Written Specifically for a Motion Picture or for Television. The song has different lyrics in the movie than on the soundtrack.

Sandy and Jr. interpreted the song in Portuguese as "Seu Coração".

Raven-Symoné recorded a cover of the song in 2004 for the soundtrack to Ella Enchanted and Disneymania 2. Both versions were released on 2004's Mulan: Special Edition.

Keke Palmer recorded a cover of the song in 2007 for the Disneymania 5 and Princess Disneymania.

The song was covered again by Liamani Segura for the soundtrack of the 2026 film Descendants: Wicked Wonderland.

== Critical reception ==
MTV described it as a "celebratory tune that captures the mood of the film's conclusion" a la "Circle of Life". Soundtrack.net felt the song "seems very out of place on this soundtrack". NPO3FM deemed the song the "big breakthrough" of 98 Degrees. DVDDizzy deemed it "catchy but out-of-left-field" and a "soundtrack anomaly", though added that the music video does a "good job at inspiring laughter". CinemaBlend felt the singers were "crooning" in the song. Billboard deemed it the 22nd best Disney Renaissance song, deeming it a "pretty promising combination" of artists, who "lived up to the hype with this playful, harmonica-flavored boy band jam".

Animated Views deemed Raven-Symone's version "over-emoted".

== Track listings ==
- UK CD single
1. "True To Your Heart" (performed by 98 Degrees, Stevie Wonder) – 4:18
2. "True To Your Heart" (Instrumental) – 4:16
3. "Was It Something I Didn't Say" (performed by 98 Degrees) – 5:02
- UK and European CD maxi single
1. "True To Your Heart" (performed by 98 Degrees, Stevie Wonder) – 4:15
2. "True To Your Heart" (Instrumental) – 4:15
3. "True To Your Heart" (98° Vocal Version) (performed by 98 Degrees) – 4:15
- European CD single
1. "True To Your Heart" (performed by 98 Degrees, Stevie Wonder) – 4:15
2. "True To Your Heart" (Instrumental) – 4:15
- Australian CD single
1. "True To Your Heart" (performed by 98 Degrees, Stevie Wonder) – 4:15
2. "I'll Make A Man Out Of You" (performed by Donny Osmond) – 3:21
- Japanese CD single
1. "True To Your Heart" (LP Version) (performed by 98 Degrees, Stevie Wonder) – 4:16
2. "Because Of You" (LP Version) (performed by 98 Degrees) – 4:56
3. "Because Of You" (Radio Edit) (performed by 98 Degrees) – 3:55

== Charts ==
Chart (1998)	Peak position
Belgium (Ultratop 50 Flanders)	31
Europe (Eurochart Hot 100)	69
Europe (European Hit Radio)	19
France (SNEP)	85
Germany (GfK)	52
Netherlands (Dutch Top 40 Tipparade)	16
Netherlands (Single Top 100)	16
Netherlands Airplay (Music & Media)	8
Scottish Singles Sales (Official Charts)	40
Switzerland (Schweizer Hitparade)	25
UK Singles (Official Charts)	51
UK Hip Hop/R&B (Official Charts)	13

== Release history ==
Region	Date	Format(s)	Label(s)	Ref.
United States	May 26, 1998	Contemporary hit radio	Walt Disney; Hollywood; Motown	
Japan	September 30, 1998	CD	Motown	
