= Give Me Just One Night (Una Noche) =

2000 single by 98 Degrees

Single by 98 Degrees

from the album Revelation
- Released: July 31, 2000
- Length: 3:24
- Label: Universal
- Songwriters: Anders Bagge; Arnthor Birgisson; Claudia Ogalde
- Producers: Anders Bagge; Arnthor Birgisson

98 Degrees singles chronology
| "Thank God I Found You" (2000) | "Give Me Just One Night (Una Noche)" (2000) | "My Everything" (2000) |

Music videos
- "Give Me Just One Night (Una Noche)" on YouTube; "Give Me Just One Night (Una Noche)" (Spanish version) on YouTube

"Give Me Just One Night (Una Noche)" is a song by American boy band 98 Degrees, released as the first single from their third studio album, Revelation, on July 31, 2000. It was a success for the group, reaching number two on the US Billboard Hot 100 and on the Canadian RPM 100 Hit Tracks chart, becoming the band's highest-charting solo effort in both nations. The song was not as successful internationally but did reach the top 40 in Australia, Sweden, and the Netherlands. The single was certified gold by Recording Industry Association of America (RIAA) for shipments of 500,000 units.

== Track listings ==
US and European CD single

1. "Give Me Just One Night (Una Noche)" – 3:25
2. "Give Me Just One Night (Una Noche)" (Spanish version) – 3:25

UK CD1

1. "Give Me Just One Night (Una Noche)" – 3:24
2. "Give Me Just One Night (Una Noche)" (Hex Hector radio edit) – 3:42
3. "Give Me Just One Night (Una Noche)" (Hex Hector club remix) – 9:29
4. "Give Me Just One Night (Una Noche)" (video)

UK CD2

1. "Give Me Just One Night (Una Noche)"
2. "Can You Imagine"
3. "Never Let Go" (Hex Hector club remix)

Australian CD single

1. "Give Me Just One Night (Una Noche)" – 3:25
2. "Give Me Just One Night (Una Noche)" (Spanish version) – 3:25
3. "Give Me Just One Night (Una Noche)" (Hex Hector radio edit) – 3:42
4. "Give Me Just One Night (Una Noche)" (video) – 3:25

Japanese CD single

1. "Give Me Just One Night (Una Noche)" (album version)
2. "Give Me Just One Night (Una Noche)" (edit version)

== Charts ==
=== Weekly charts ===
| Chart (2000) | Peak position |
|---|---|
| Australia (ARIA) | 21 |
| Australian Dance (ARIA) | 15 |
| Canada Top Singles (RPM) | 2 |
| Canada Adult Contemporary (RPM) | 15 |
| Iceland (Íslenski Listinn Topp 40) | 12 |
| Netherlands (Dutch Top 40) | 32 |
| Netherlands (Single Top 100) | 40 |
| New Zealand (Recorded Music NZ) | 12 |
| Scottish Singles Sales (Official Charts) | 75 |
| Sweden (Sverigetopplistan) | 33 |
| Switzerland (Schweizer Hitparade) | 58 |
| UK Singles (Official Charts) | 61 |
| US Billboard Hot 100 | 2 |
| US Adult Pop Airplay (Billboard) | 38 |
| US Pop Airplay (Billboard) | 8 |
| US Rhythmic Airplay (Billboard) | 19 |
| US Top 40 Tracks (Billboard) | 10 |

=== Year-end charts ===
| Chart (2000) | Position |
|---|---|
| Taiwan (Hito Radio) | 60 |
| US Billboard Hot 100 | 57 |
| US Mainstream Top 40 (Billboard) | 49 |
| US Rhythmic Top 40 (Billboard) | 77 |

== Certifications ==
| Region | Certification | Certified units/sales |
|---|---|---|
| United States (RIAA) | Gold | 500,000^{^} |
^{^} Shipments figures based on certification alone.

== Release history ==
| Region | Date | Format(s) | Label(s) | Ref. |
|---|---|---|---|---|
| United States | July 31, 2000 | Hot adult contemporary radio | Universal | |
| United States | August 1, 2000 | Rhythmic contemporary; contemporary hit radio | Universal | |
| Japan | August 23, 2000 | CD | Universal | |
| United States | September 12, 2000 | 7-inch vinyl; CD | Universal | |
| United Kingdom | November 20, 2000 | CD; cassette | Universal | |
