= My Everything (98 Degrees song) =

2000 single by 98 Degrees

Single by 98 Degrees

from the album Revelation
- B-side: "Can You Imagine"; "Never Let Go"
- Released: November 6, 2000
- Length: 3:51
- Label: Universal
- Songwriters: Anders Bagge; Arnthor Birgisson; J. Jeffre; Nick Lachey
- Producers: Anders Bagge; Anthor Birgisson

98 Degrees singles chronology
"Give Me Just One Night (Una Noche)" (2000)	"My Everything" (2000)	"The Way You Want Me To" (2001)

Music video
- "My Everything" on YouTube

"My Everything" is the second single released by American boy band 98 Degrees from their third studio album, Revelation. "My Everything" did not achieve the success of their previous single, "Give Me Just One Night (Una Noche)", but did reach the top 40 on the US Billboard Hot 100. Internationally, it appeared on the Australian Singles Chart, peaking at number 88 in March 2001.

== Music video ==
The music video features an appearance by Nick Lachey with Jessica Simpson who plays a waitress who works at a restaurant and hugs him who plays a tow truck driver. Drew Lachey is returning from U.S. military service and the woman he hugs is his real-life high school sweetheart and wife Lea. Justin Jeffre's scene takes place in a church, a cemetery, and later seen at home looking at a photo album and seeing photos of his grandmother. Jeff Timmons' scene takes place at an auto repair shop as a mechanic looking at a photo of his daughter.

== Track listings ==
Australasian CD single

1. "My Everything"
2. "Give Me Just One Night (Una Noche)" (Hex Hector club mix)
3. "Can You Imagine"
4. "Never Let Go"

Japanese CD single

1. "My Everything"
2. "Give Me Just One Night (Una Noche)" (Kns Groove mix)
3. "Give Me Just One Night (Una Noche)" (Kns mix)
4. "Give Me Just One Night (Una Noche)" (Hex Hector club mix)
5. "Give Me Just One Night (Una Noche)" (Spanish version)

== Charts ==
=== Weekly charts ===
Chart (2000–2001)	Peak position
Australia (ARIA)	88
US Billboard Hot 100	34
US Adult Contemporary (Billboard)	13
US Pop Airplay (Billboard)	12
US Rhythmic Airplay (Billboard)	21

=== Year-end charts ===
Chart (2001)	Position
US Adult Contemporary (Billboard)	28
US Mainstream Top 40 (Billboard)	65
US Rhythmic Top 40 (Billboard)	91

== Release history ==
Region	Date	Format(s)	Label(s)	ID	Ref(s).
United States	November 6, 2000	Hot adult contemporary radio	Universal	—N/a	
United States	November 7, 2000	Contemporary hit; rhythmic contemporary radio	Universal	—N/a	
Japan	November 29, 2000	CD	Universal	UICU-5002	
Australia	February 26, 2001	CD	Universal	158 787-2	
