= 98 Degrees (album) =

Studio album by 98 Degrees
- Released: July 29, 1997
- Recorded: 1996–1997
- Studios: Soundtrack Studios (New York); Paramount Recordings (Los Angeles); Desert Moon Studios (Anaheim); Chung King Studios (New York); The Hit Factory (New York); Silent Sound Recording Studios (Atlanta); Pasturegate Studios (Munster); Hinge Studios (Chicago); 4-Jewels Recording Company (Hammond); Boss Productions (Atlanta)
- Genres: Pop; R&B
- Length: 48:58
- Label: Motown
- Producers: 98 Degrees; Armando Colon; Shep Crawford; Dane DeViller; Maxx Frank; Professor Funk; Steve Grissette; Bernard Grubman; Sean Hall; Sean Hosein; Montell Jordan; Rashad Smith; Tricky Stewart; Mario Winans

98 Degrees chronology
98 Degrees (1997)	98 Degrees and Rising (1998)

Singles from 98 Degrees
- 1. "Invisible Man" Released: June 24, 1997; 2. "Was It Something I Didn't Say" Released: March 10, 1998

Professional ratings
Review scores
Source	Rating
AllMusic	3/5 stars
Robert Christgau	C−

98 Degrees (stylized as 98°) is the debut album by American male vocal group 98 Degrees. The album debuted and peaked at number 145 and number 88 on the U.S. Billboard 200 and Top R&B/Hip-Hop Albums respectively. The album sold over 500,000 copies in the U.S.

== Track listing ==
=== Original version ===
No.	Title	Writer(s)	Producer(s)	Length
1.	"Intro" (spoken by Justin Jeffre)	98 Degrees, Bernard Grubman		0:38
2.	"Come and Get It" (lead vocals by Nick Lachey; spoken by Justin Jeffre)	Montell Jordan	Jordan	4:28
3.	"Invisible Man" (lead vocals by Nick Lachey and Jeff Timmons; spoken by Justin Jeffre)	Dane DeViller, Sean Hosein, Steve Kipner	DeViller, Hosein	4:41
4.	"Take My Breath Away" (lead vocals by Nick Lachey and Jeff Timmons)	Steve Grissette, Maxx Frank	Grissette, Frank	4:31
5.	"Hand in Hand" (lead vocals by Nick Lachey and LaShanda Reese)	Mario Winans, Kenneth Hickson	Winans	5:18
6.	"Intermood" (lead vocals by 98 Degrees)	98 Degrees, Grubman		0:31
7.	"Dreaming" (lead vocals by Jeff Timmons and Nick Lachey; spoken by Justin Jeffre)	Jordan, Shep Crawford, Professor Funk	Jordan, Crawford, Professor Funk	4:00
8.	"You Are Everything" (lead vocals by Jeff Timmons)	Linda Creed, Thom Bell	Winans	2:50
9.	"Heaven's Missing An Angel" (lead vocals by Nick Lachey and Jeff Timmons)	Christopher A. Stewart, Sean K. Hall, Sam Salter, Tab	Tricky, Sean	4:42
10.	"I Wasn't Over You" (lead vocals by Nick Lachey)	Stewart, Hall, Tab	Tricky, Sean	4:20
11.	"Completely" (lead vocals by Jeff Timmons and Nick Lachey; spoken by Justin Jeffre)	98 Degrees, Grubman	98 Degrees, Grubman	4:05
12.	"Don't Stop the Love" (lead vocals by Nick Lachey; spoken by Justin Jeffre)	Stewart, Hall, Robin Thicke	Tricky, Sean	4:31
13.	"I Wanna Love You" (lead vocals by Nick Lachey)	Kenny Greene, Rashad Smith, Armando Colon	Rashad Smith, Colon	4:00

=== Re-released version ===
- The album was re-released on March 10, 1998, and "You Are Everything" was replaced with "Was It Something I Didn't Say", which was produced by Daryl Simmons.

No.	Title	Writer(s)	Length
1.	"Intro"	98° and Bernard Grubman	0:38
2.	"Come and Get It"	Montell Jordan	4:28
3.	"Invisible Man"	Dane DeViller, Sean Hosein, and Steve Kipner	4:41
4.	"Was It Something I Didn't Say"	Diane Warren	5:02
5.	"Take My Breath Away"	Steve Grissette and Maxx Frank	4:31
6.	"Hand in Hand"	Mario Winans and Kenneth Hickson	5:18
7.	"Intermood"	98° and Bernard Grubman	0:31
8.	"Dreaming"	Montell Jordan, Shep Crawford, and Professor Funk	4:00
9.	"Heaven's Missing An Angel"	Christopher A. Stewart, Sean K. Hall, Sam Salter, and Tab	4:42
10.	"I Wasn't Over You"	Christopher A. Stewart, Sean K. Hall, and Tab	4:20
11.	"Completely"	98° and Bernard Grubman	4:05
12.	"Don't Stop the Love"	Christopher A. Stewart, Sean K. Hall, and Robin Thicke	4:31
13.	"I Wanna Love You"	Kenny Greene, Rashad Smith, and Armando Colon	4:00

== Singles ==
- "Invisible Man", the first single from the group was released on June 24, 1997. The song managed to enter the top twenty of the Billboard Hot 100 peaking at number twelve.
- "Was It Something I Didn't Say" was the second and final single from the album and it was released on March 10, 1998. The song did not enjoy the success of the former single, but was able to help make the album reach Gold certification.

== Charts ==
=== Weekly charts ===
Chart (1997–1998)	Peak position
Canada Top Albums/CDs (RPM)	46
Malaysian Albums (IFPI)	8
US Billboard 200	145
US Top R&B/Hip-Hop Albums (Billboard)	78

== Certifications ==
Region	Certification	Certified units/sales
Canada (Music Canada)	3× Platinum	300,000^{^}
United States (RIAA)	Gold	500,000^{^}
^{^} Shipments figures based on certification alone.

== Credits ==
=== 98° ===
- Jeff Timmons—vocals
- Nick Lachey—vocals
- Justin Jeffre—vocals
- Drew Lachey—vocals

=== Additional musicians ===
- Bernard Grubman – all instruments (1, 6, 11)
- Kim Morrow – vocals (2)
- Montell Jordan – vocal arrangements (2)
- Shep Crawford – keyboards (2), vocal arrangements (2)
- Jazzy D. – additional keyboards (2)
- James Genus – electric bass guitar (3)
- Dane DeViller – acoustic guitar (3)
- Tony "Downtown" Brown – bass guitar (4)
- Maxx Frank – keyboards (4), string arrangement (4)
- Nathan Maxxwell – keyboard overdubs (4)
- Craig McCreary – acoustic guitar (4)
- Mario Winans – all instruments (5)
- Tommy Martin – guitar (7, 10)
- Tricky & Sean – all instruments except guitar (7, 10), all instruments (12), keyboards (9)
- Armando Colon – keyboards (13)
- Rashad Smith – drum programming (13)
