= The Hardest Thing (98 Degrees song) =

1999 single by 98 Degrees

Single by 98 Degrees

from the album 98 Degrees and Rising
- Released: June 8, 1999
- Studio: Soundtrack (New York City)
- Length: 4:34 (album version); 3:47 (radio version)
- Label: Universal
- Songwriters: Steve Kipner; David Frank
- Producers: David Frank; Steve Kipner

98 Degrees singles chronology
"Because of You" (1998)	"The Hardest Thing" (1999)	"I Do (Cherish You)" (1999)

Music video
- "The Hardest Thing" on YouTube

"The Hardest Thing" is the third single released from American boy band 98 Degrees's second studio album, 98 Degrees and Rising (1998). It was released to radio in February 1999 and as a physical single in June 1999. "The Hardest Thing" peaked at number five in the United States, number 10 in Canada, number 29 in the United Kingdom, and number 31 in Ireland. It also experienced moderate success in Oceania, peaking at number 24 in Australia and number five in New Zealand. The single was certified gold by the Recording Industry Association of America (RIAA) for sales of 500,000 units.

== Song meaning ==
The song is about a man who is torn between two women that he loves: one being his significant other and the other being his mistress. This is apparent when Doctor Zhivago is referenced in the second verse of the song. In the end, the man chooses to say goodbye to his mistress because it is only fair to his significant other, who has always trusted him. This becomes clear in the first verse of the song when he says, "I've got somewhere else to be, promises to keep / Someone else who loves me and trusts me fast asleep." However, as he is saying goodbye to the mistress, he has to hide his true feelings (love) from her; hence, the title of the song: "The Hardest Thing". As he says goodbye to his mistress, he thinks, "It's the hardest thing I'll ever have to do to look you in the eye and tell you I don't love you." However, he knows that their love is real and that they will (hopefully) meet again when the time is right: "I know that we'll meet again/Fate has a place and time / So you can get on with your life."

== Music video ==
The music video takes place inside a boxing arena. Nick Lachey, the protagonist in the video, is the gentleman who is torn between two ladies. Lachey is a boxer in the video, and his mistress is a show girl. His significant other is not in the video.

== Track listings ==
US, Australasian, and Japanese CD single

1. "The Hardest Thing" (radio edit)
2. "Because of You" (Hex Hector dance mix)
3. "Invisible Man" (album version)

US cassette single

A1. "The Hardest Thing" (edit)
A2. "Because of You" (Hex Hecto dance mix)
B1. "The Hardest Thing" (album version)
B2. "Invisible Man" (album version)

European CD single

1. "The Hardest Thing" (radio edit) – 3:45
2. "The Hardest Thing" (Love to Infinity radio mix) – 3:45

European maxi-CD single

1. "The Hardest Thing" (radio edit) – 3:45
2. "The Hardest Thing" (Love to Infinity radio mix) – 3:45
3. "The Hardest Thing" (Love to Infinity Master mix) – 6:35
4. "The Hardest Thing" (Murlyn remix) – 3:47

UK CD single

1. "The Hardest Thing" (radio edit) – 3:45
2. "The Hardest Thing" (album version) – 4:34
3. "The Hardest Thing" (Love to Infinity Master mix) – 3:46
4. "The Hardest Thing" (video)

== Charts ==
=== Weekly charts ===
Chart (1999–2000)	Peak position
Australia (ARIA)	24
Canada Top Singles (RPM)	10
Canada Adult Contemporary (RPM)	4
Europe (Eurochart Hot 100)	96
Iceland (Íslenski Listinn Topp 40)	36
Ireland (IRMA)	31
New Zealand (Recorded Music NZ)	5
Scottish Singles Sales (Official Charts)	38
Spain Airplay (Top 40 Radio)	40
UK Singles (Official Charts)	29
US Billboard Hot 100	5
US Adult Contemporary (Billboard)	2
US Adult Pop Airplay (Billboard)	32
US Pop Airplay (Billboard)	6
US Rhythmic Airplay (Billboard)	10

=== Year-end charts ===
Chart (1999)	Position
Canada Top Singles (RPM)	82
Canada Adult Contemporary (RPM)	18
New Zealand (RIANZ)	39
US Billboard Hot 100	37
US Adult Contemporary (Billboard)	12
US Adult Top 40 (Billboard)	87
US Mainstream Top 40 (Billboard)	25
US Rhythmic Top 40 (Billboard)	44

Chart (2000)	Position
US Adult Contemporary (Billboard)	30

== Certifications ==
Region	Certification	Certified units/sales
United States (RIAA)	Gold	500,000^{^}
^{^} Shipments figures based on certification alone.

== Release history ==
Region	Date	Format(s)	Label(s)	Ref.
United States	February 23, 1999	Rhythmic contemporary; contemporary hit radio	Universal	
United States	June 8, 1999	CD; cassette	Universal	
Japan	July 1, 1999	CD	Universal	
United Kingdom	February 28, 2000	CD; cassette	Universal	
