= Invisible Man (song) =

1997 single by 98 Degrees

Single by 98 Degrees

from the album 98 Degrees
- Released: June 24, 1997
- Studio: Chung King, The Hit Factory, Soundtrack (New York City)
- Length: 4:41 (LP version); 3:53 (radio edit)
- Label: Motown
- Songwriters: Dane DeViller; Sean Hosein; Steve Kipner
- Producers: Dane DeViller; Sean Hosein

98 Degrees singles chronology
"Invisible Man" (1997)	"Was It Something I Didn't Say" (1998)

Music video
- "Invisible Man" on YouTube

Alternative cover
- UK CD2 artwork

"Invisible Man" is a song by American boy band 98 Degrees, released on June 24, 1997, as their debut single and as the lead single from their first album, 98 Degrees (1997). It was their breakthrough hit, peaking at number 12 on the US Billboard Hot 100 and number four in Canada. The song is featured as a bonus track on the European version of 98 Degrees and Rising. An acoustic version of the song is the closing track on their 2013 studio album 2.0.

== Music video ==
Two music videos were made for the song. The second and more popular was shot in colors featuring the 98 Degrees members in a party with people dancing, some scenes show the members sitting on a couch while singing and some alternate shots featuring each member on what appears to be an apartment footbridge.

The first was shot in black and white with the members getting out of a car during rain then running into an empty warehouse where they start singing under shelter. The video intercuts with shots of the group singing in the rain by a vintage car. The black and white music video was noted at the time for strong similarities to Take That's "Back for Good" and East 17's "Do U Still?".

== Track listings ==
US single

1. "Invisible Man" (LP version) – 4:41 (Kipner, DeViller, Hosein)
2. "Invisible Man" (instrumental) – 4:42 (Kipner, DeViller, Hosein)

12-inch vinyl, maxi-single

A1. "Invisible Man" (Soul Solution club mix) – 5:20
A2. "Invisible Man" (Soul Solution dub mix) – 3:46
B1. "Invisible Man" (Soul Solution instrumental mix) – 5:21
B2. "Invisible Man" (Soul Solution radio edit) – 2:50
B3. "Invisible Man" (Soul Solution a cappella mix) – 3:01

UK single

1. "Invisible Man" (radio edit) – 3:53
2. "Invisible Man" (LP version) – 4:41

UK maxi-CD

1. "Invisible Man" (radio edit) – 3:53
2. "Invisible Man" (LP version) – 4:41
3. "Invisible Man" (instrumental) – 4:42
4. "Invisible Man" (a cappella) – 4:26

== Charts ==
=== Weekly charts ===
Chart (1997)	Peak position
Canada (Nielsen SoundScan)	6
Canada Top Singles (RPM)	4
Canada Adult Contemporary (RPM)	4
New Zealand (Recorded Music NZ)	10
Scottish Singles Sales (Official Charts)	77
UK Singles (Official Charts)	66
US Billboard Hot 100	12
US Adult Contemporary (Billboard)	26
US Hot R&B/Hip-Hop Songs (Billboard)	38
US Pop Airplay (Billboard)	12
US Rhythmic Airplay (Billboard)	8

=== Year-end charts ===
Chart (1997)	Position
Canada Top Singles (RPM)	38
Canada Adult Contemporary (RPM)	37
US Billboard Hot 100	45
US Rhythmic Top 40 (Billboard)	40
US Top 40/Mainstream (Billboard)	43

== Certifications ==
Region	Certification	Certified units/sales
United States (RIAA)	Gold	700,000

== Release history ==
Region	Date	Format(s)	Label(s)	Ref.
United States	June 24, 1997	Rhythmic contemporary; contemporary hit radio	Motown	
United Kingdom	November 17, 1997	CD; cassette	Motown	
