= I Do (Cherish You) =

1998 single by Mark Wills

Single by Mark Wills

from the album Wish You Were Here
- B-side: "You Can't Go Wrong Loving Me"
- Released: February 23, 1998
- Genre: Country
- Length: 3:19
- Label: Mercury Nashville
- Songwriters: Dan Hill; Keith Stegall
- Producer: Carson Chamberlain

Mark Wills singles chronology
"Places I've Never Been" (1997)	"I Do (Cherish You)" (1998)	"Don't Laugh at Me" (1998)

Music video
- "I Do (Cherish You)" on YouTube

"I Do (Cherish You)" is a song written by Keith Stegall and Dan Hill. It was first released in February 1998 by American country music artist Mark Wills. The first single from his second album, Wish You Were Here, it became his third top-10 hit on the US Billboard Hot Country Singles & Tracks chart that year.

== Music video ==
Mark Wills' music video, directed by Peter Zavadil and shown in black-and-white, features Wills inside a train station. The video ends with his love coming in the doors, and he gives her an engagement ring. The music video for the 98 Degrees version, directed by Wayne Isham, features the members of the band separately dating a lady played by Ali Landry. At the end of the video, she marries a gentleman played by Dustin Diamond, much to the chagrin of the four band members.

== Track listing ==
CD single

1. "I Do (Cherish You)" – 3:17
2. "You Can't Go Wrong Loving Me" – 3:05

== Charts ==
=== Weekly charts ===
Chart (1998)	Peak position
Canada Country Singles (RPM)	3
US Billboard Hot 100	72
US Hot Country Songs (Billboard)	2

=== Year-end charts ===
Chart (1998)	Position
Canada Country Tracks (RPM)	60
US Country Songs (Billboard)	16

== 98 Degrees version ==
"I Do (Cherish You)"

Single by 98 Degrees

from the album 98 Degrees and Rising
- Released: July 12, 1999
- Length: 3:45
- Label: Universal
- Songwriters: Dan Hill; Keith Stegall
- Producer: Keith Thomas

98 Degrees singles chronology
"The Hardest Thing" (1999)	"I Do (Cherish You)" (1999)	"This Gift" (1999)

Music video
- "I Do (Cherish You)" on YouTube

In July 1999, American vocal group 98 Degrees released a cover of the song as the fourth and final single from their second album, 98 Degrees and Rising. Their version peaked at number 13 on the Billboard Hot 100. It was also included on the soundtrack for the 1999 romantic film Notting Hill. It also appeared on the NBC Saturday morning television sitcom City Guys, where the group performed at the school courtyard in the episode "Dance Fever".

=== Track listing ===
German maxi-CD single

1. "I Do (Cherish You)" (radio edit) – 3:45
2. "I Do (Cherish You)" (Love to Infinity radio mix) – 3:31
3. "I Do (Cherish You)" (Love to Infinity master mix) – 5:35
4. "Because of You" (Hex Hector dance mix) – 3:04

=== Charts ===
==== Weekly charts ====
Chart (1999–2000)	Peak position
Australia (ARIA)	23
Canada Top Singles (RPM)	11
Canada Adult Contemporary (RPM)	1
Canada CHR (Nielsen BDS)	9
Netherlands (Single Top 100)	79
New Zealand (Recorded Music NZ)	43
US Billboard Hot 100	13
US Adult Contemporary (Billboard)	4
US Adult Pop Airplay (Billboard)	36
US Pop Airplay (Billboard)	7
US Rhythmic Airplay (Billboard)	5
US Top 40 Tracks (Billboard)	9

==== Year-end charts ====
Chart (1999)	Position
Canada Top Singles (RPM)	53
Canada Adult Contemporary (RPM)	10
US Billboard Hot 100	68
US Adult Contemporary (Billboard)	39
US Mainstream Top 40 (Billboard)	35
US Rhythmic Top 40 (Billboard)	28

Chart (2000)	Position
US Adult Contemporary (Billboard)	13

=== Release history ===
Region	Date	Format(s)	Label(s)	Ref(s).
United States	July 12, 1999	Hot adult contemporary; modern adult contemporary radio	Universal	
United States	July 13, 1999	Rhythmic contemporary; contemporary hit radio	Universal	
