= 98 Degrees and Rising =

1998 studio album by 98 Degrees

Studio album by 98 Degrees
- Released: October 20, 1998
- Recorded: 1998
- Studios: Unique Recording Studios (New York City, New York); The Hit Factory (New York City); Banana Toons (Vancouver, British Columbia); Blue Wave (Vancouver); The Bennett House (Franklin, Tennessee); Wave House (Vancouver); Chung King Studios (New York City); Murlyn Studios (Stockholm, Sweden); Record One (Van Nuys, California); The Record Plant (Los Angeles, California); Soundtrack Studios (New York City); 16th Avenue Sound (Nashville, Tennessee); Sixth Avenue Sound (Nashville)
- Genres: Pop; R&B
- Length: 47:42
- Label: Motown
- Producers: 98 Degrees; Trackmasters; Dane DeViller & Sean Hosein; Keith Thomas; Pras Michel; Jerry Wonda; Matthew Wilder; Anders "Bag" Bagge; Arnthor Birgisson; David Frank; Steve Kipner; Devon Biere

98 Degrees chronology
98 Degrees (1997)	98 Degrees and Rising (1998)	This Christmas (1999)

Singles from 98 Degrees and Rising
- 1. "True to Your Heart" Released: July 21, 1998; 2. "Because of You" Released: September 15, 1998; 3. "The Hardest Thing" Released: June 8, 1999; 4. "I Do (Cherish You)" Released: July 27, 1999

Professional ratings
Review scores
Source	Rating
AllMusic	3/5 stars

98 Degrees and Rising is the second album released by American boy band 98 Degrees. Released by Motown on October 20, 1998, it features the Billboard Hot 100 top-five singles "Because of You" (No. 3) and "The Hardest Thing" (No. 5), cover versions of Mark Wills' "I Do (Cherish You)" and Michael Jackson's "She's Out of My Life", the duet "True to Your Heart" with label mate Stevie Wonder from the soundtrack of the 1998 Disney film Mulan, and the song "Fly with Me", which was featured on the soundtrack album for the 1999 film Pokémon: The First Movie (although it does not appear in the film itself).

The album has sold over four million copies in the United States alone, including 3.6 million as of 2012, becoming the band's best-selling album. This was also the band's last album on Motown (not counting the Japanese release of This Christmas) before they left for Motown's parent company, Universal Records.

== Track listing ==
No.	Title	Writer(s)	Producer(s)	Length
1.	"Intro"		98 Degrees	0:41
2.	"Heat It Up"	Jeff Timmons; Nick Lachey; Drew Lachey; Justin Jeffre; Daniel Webster; Mark Adams; Mark Hicks; Raymond Turner; Starleana Young; Steve Arrington; Thomas Lockett	Poke & Tone; 98 Degrees^{[a]}	4:15
3.	"If She Only Knew"	Gordon Chambers; Chris Farren	Dane DeViller; Sean Hosein; 98 Degrees^{[b]}	4:27
4.	"I Do (Cherish You)"	Dan Hill; Keith Stegall	Keith Thomas	3:45
5.	"Fly with Me"	Timmons; N. Lachey; D. Lachey; Jeffre; Benny Andersson; Björn Ulvaeus; Jerry Duplessis; S.P. Michel; Stig Anderson	Michel; Duplessis^{[b]}; 98 Degrees^{[a]}	3:49
6.	"Still"	Timmons; N. Lachey; A. Lachey; Jeffre; DeViller; Hosein	DeViller; Hosein; 98 Degrees^{[b]}	4:00
7.	"Because of You"	Anders Bagge; Arnthor Birgisson; Christian Karlsson; Patrick Tucker	Bag, Bloodshy & Arnthor	4:57
8.	"Give It Up" (Interlude)	Timmons; N. Lachey; D. Lachey; Jeffre	98 Degrees	1:31
9.	"Do You Wanna Dance"	Timmons; N. Lachey; D. Lachey; Jeffre; Samuel Barnes; Jean-Claude Olivier; Charles Smith; Eumir Deodato; George Brown; James Taylor; Robert Bell; Robert Mickens; Ronald Bell	Poke & Tone; 98 Degrees^{[a]}	4:14
10.	"True to Your Heart" (featuring Stevie Wonder)	Matthew Wilder; David Zippel	Wilder	4:15
11.	"To Me You're Everything"	A. Bagge; Eduardo Del-Barrio; Jocelyn Mathieux Gueridon; Laila Bagge; Maurice White; Verdine White	Bag	4:09
12.	"The Hardest Thing"	David Frank; Steve Kipner	Frank; Kipner; 98 Degrees^{[c]}	4:34
13.	"She's Out of My Life"	Tom Bahler	98 Degrees; Devon Beire^{[b]}	3:07
Total length:				47:42

Notes

- ^{^[a]} signifies vocal production
- ^{^[b]} signifies co-production
- ^{^[c]} signifies additional production
- "Heat It Up" contains samples of "Just a Touch of Love" written by Daniel Webster, Mark Adams, Mark Hicks, Raymond Turner, Starleana Young, Steve Arrington, and Thomas Lockett and performed by Slave
- "Fly With Me" contains samples of "Dancing Queen" written by Benny Andersson, Björn Ulvaeus, and Stig Anderson and performed by ABBA
- "Do You Wanna Dance" contains a sample of "Get Down on It" written by Charles Smith, Eumir Deodato, George Brown, James Taylor, Robert Bell, Robert Mickens, and Ronald Bell and performed by Kool & the Gang
- "To Me You're Everything" contains samples of "Fantasy" written by Maurice White, Eduardo Del-Barrio, and Verdine White and performed by Earth, Wind, & Fire

=== Asian and Dutch edition ===
No.	Title	Length
1.	"Intro"	0:42
2.	"Heat It Up"	4:14
3.	"If She Only Knew"	4:28
4.	"I Do (Cherish You)"	3:46
5.	"Still"	4:01
6.	"Because of You"	4:57
7.	"Give It Up" (Interlude)	1:31
8.	"Do You Wanna Dance"	4:14
9.	"True to Your Heart"	4:16
10.	"To Me You're Everything"	4:10
11.	"The Hardest Thing"	4:33
12.	"She's Out of My Life"	3:08
13.	"Invisible Man"	4:43
14.	"Fly with Me"	3:51
15.	"The Hardest Thing" (Love to Infinity 12" Mix)	6:37
16.	"Because of You" (Hex Hector Dance Mix)	3:07

Bonus disc
No.	Title	Length
1.	"This Gift" (Christmas version)	4:06
2.	"The Christmas Song"	4:08
3.	"This Gift" (pop version)	4:08

Bonus videos
No.	Title	Length
1.	"I Do (Cherish You)"	3:46
2.	"The Hardest Thing"	3:54
3.	"Because of You"	4:02
4.	"Invisible Man"	4:02
5.	"Was It Something I Didn't Say"	4:14

== Personnel ==
98 Degrees

- Justin Jeffre – vocals, including lead vocals (9) and spoken vocals (2, 9, 10, 12)
- Drew Lachey – vocals, including lead vocals (6, 9)
- Nick Lachey – lead vocals (all tracks except 1 and 8)
- Jeff Timmons – vocals, including lead vocals (3, 5, 6, 7, 12, 13)

Additional musicians

- Bag – all instruments (11)
- Kern Brantley – bass (2)
- Dane DeViller – classical guitar (3), guitar (6)
- Dr. Roy – trumpet (12)
- Latoya Duggin – backing vocals (2)
- Sylvia Duggin – backing vocals (2)
- Taneka Duggin – backing vocals (2)
- Stephen Erdody – cello (12)
- David Frank – keyboards (12)
- Mark Hammond – drum programming (4)
- Mattias Johansson – violin (7)
- Gordon Kennedy – guitars (4)
- Brian Newcombe – electric bass (3)
- Beata Söderberg – cello (7)
- Keith Thomas – bass (4), keyboards (4)
- Patrick Tucker – guitar (7)
- Stevie Wonder – additional vocals (10), backing vocals (10)

Technical

- 98 Degrees – vocal arrangements (5, 9)
- Paul Arnold – recording engineer (12)
- Bag – recording engineer (11)
- Chris Bailey – assistant recording engineer (5)
- Tom Bender – mix engineer (1), assistant mix engineer (3, 8)
- Devon Biere – arrangements (13)
- Dane DeViller – arrangements (3), mix engineer (3), mixing (6), programming (3, 6)
- Chris Fogel – recording engineer (10)
- David Frank – arrangements (12)
- Chris Gehringer – mastering
- Jason Goldstein – recording engineer (2, 9)
- Mick Guzauski – mixing (1, 6, 12), mix engineer (3, 6, 8, 13)
- Adam D. Hatley – assistant recording engineer (13)
- Sean Hosein – arrangements (3), mix engineer (3), mixing (6), programming (3, 6)
- Mikael Ifversen – recording engineer (12)
- Steve Igner – recording engineer (1, 8)
- Phil Kaffel – mix engineer (10), recording engineer (10)
- John Kelton – recording engineer (13)
- Steve Kipner – arrangements (12)
- Matt Marteinsson – assistant recording engineer (3, 6)
- Mark Nevers – assistant recording engineer (13)
- Alex Olsson – assistant recording engineer (7, 11)
- Greg Parker – assistant recording engineer (4)
- Pras – mix engineer (5)
- Cathy Rich – assistant recording engineer (12)
- Bob Rosa – mix engineer (7, 11), recording engineer (7, 11)
- Steve Smith – recording engineer (3, 6)
- Chris Theis – mix engineer (5), recording engineer (5)
- Rich Travali – mix engineer (2, 9)
- Craig Waddell – Pro Tools (3, 6)
- Bill Whittington – recording engineer (4), mix engineer (4)
- Gary Winger – assistant recording engineer (3, 6)

== Charts ==
=== Weekly charts ===
Chart (1998–99)	Peak position
Australian Albums (ARIA)	27
Canadian Albums (RPM)	24
Canadian R&B Albums (Nielsen SoundScan)	7
New Zealand Albums (RMNZ)	33
Singapore Albums (SPVA)	6
US Billboard 200	14
US Top R&B/Hip-Hop Albums (Billboard)	28

=== Year-end charts ===
Chart (1999)	Position
US Billboard 200	25
US Top R&B/Hip-Hop Albums (Billboard)	65

Chart (2000)	Position
US Billboard 200	92

== Certifications ==
Region	Certification	Certified units/sales
United States (RIAA)	4× Platinum	4,000,000^{^}
^{^} Shipments figures based on certification alone.
