= Because of You (98 Degrees song) =

1998 single by 98 Degrees

Single by 98 Degrees

from the album 98 Degrees and Rising
- B-side: "True to Your Heart"
- Released: September 15, 1998
- Studio: Chung King (New York City); Murlyn (Stockholm, Sweden)
- Genre: Pop
- Length: 4:55 (album version); 3:55 (radio edit)
- Label: Motown
- Songwriters: Anders Bagge; Arntor Birgisson; Christian Karlsson; Patrick Tucker
- Producers: Christian Karlsson; Anders Bagge; Arnthor Birgisson

98 Degrees singles chronology
"True to Your Heart" (1998)	"Because of You" (1998)	"The Hardest Thing" (1999)

Music video
- "Because of You" on YouTube

Alternative cover
- Limited edition cover

"Because of You" is a 1998 song by American vocal group 98 Degrees, released as the second single from their second album, 98 Degrees and Rising (1998). It peaked at number three on the US Billboard Hot 100 and was certified platinum by the Recording Industry Association of America in December 1998. Worldwide, it reached number seven in Canada and also charted in Australia, Germany, the Netherlands, and the United Kingdom. In 2018, Billboard ranked the song 96th on its "Greatest Boy Band Songs of All Time" list.

== Music video ==
The music video for "Because of You", directed by Wayne Isham, takes place in San Francisco. It follows a teenage girl traveling around the city by bus, taxi, and trolley, with the 98 Degrees band members appearing on billboards. They are also seen on the beach, in a garden of flowers, and on the Golden Gate Bridge. The video utilizes quick zooming and morphing effects.

== Track listings ==
US CD and cassette single

1. "Because of You" (radio edit) – 3:55
2. "True to Your Heart" (LP version featuring Stevie Wonder) – 4:15

UK CD single

1. "Because of You" (album version) – 4:55
2. "Was It Something I Didn't Say" – 5:02
3. "Because of You" (Hex Hector remix radio edit 2) – 3:36
4. "Because of You" (Kano Dub) – 7:02

Australasian CD single

1. "Because of You" (radio edit) – 3:58
2. "True to Your Heart" (LP version featuring Stevie Wonder) – 4:17
3. "Because of You" (album version) – 4:56

== Charts ==
=== Weekly charts ===
Chart (1998–1999)	Peak position
Australia (ARIA)	63
Canada (Nielsen SoundScan)	5
Canada Top Singles (RPM)	7
Canada Adult Contemporary (RPM)	20
Europe (European Hit Radio)	47
Germany (GfK)	99
Netherlands (Dutch Top 40 Tipparade)	4
Netherlands (Single Top 100)	43
Scottish Singles Sales (Official Charts)	35
UK Singles (Official Charts)	36
UK Hip Hop/R&B (Official Charts)	9
US Billboard Hot 100	3
US Pop Airplay (Billboard)	15
US Rhythmic Airplay (Billboard)	39

=== Year-end charts ===
Chart (1998)	Position
US Billboard Hot 100	82
US Mainstream Top 40 (Billboard)	82

Chart (1999)	Position
Canada Top Singles (RPM)	91
US Billboard Hot 100	69
US Mainstream Top 40 (Billboard)	67

== Certifications ==
Region	Certification	Certified units/sales
United States (RIAA)	Platinum	1,000,000

== Release history ==
Region	Date	Format(s)	Label(s)	Ref.
United States	August 11, 1998	Contemporary hit radio	Motown	
United States	September 15, 1998	CD	Motown	
Canada	September 29, 1998	CD	Motown	
United Kingdom	March 1, 1999	CD; cassette	Motown	
