= Haley Reinhart discography =

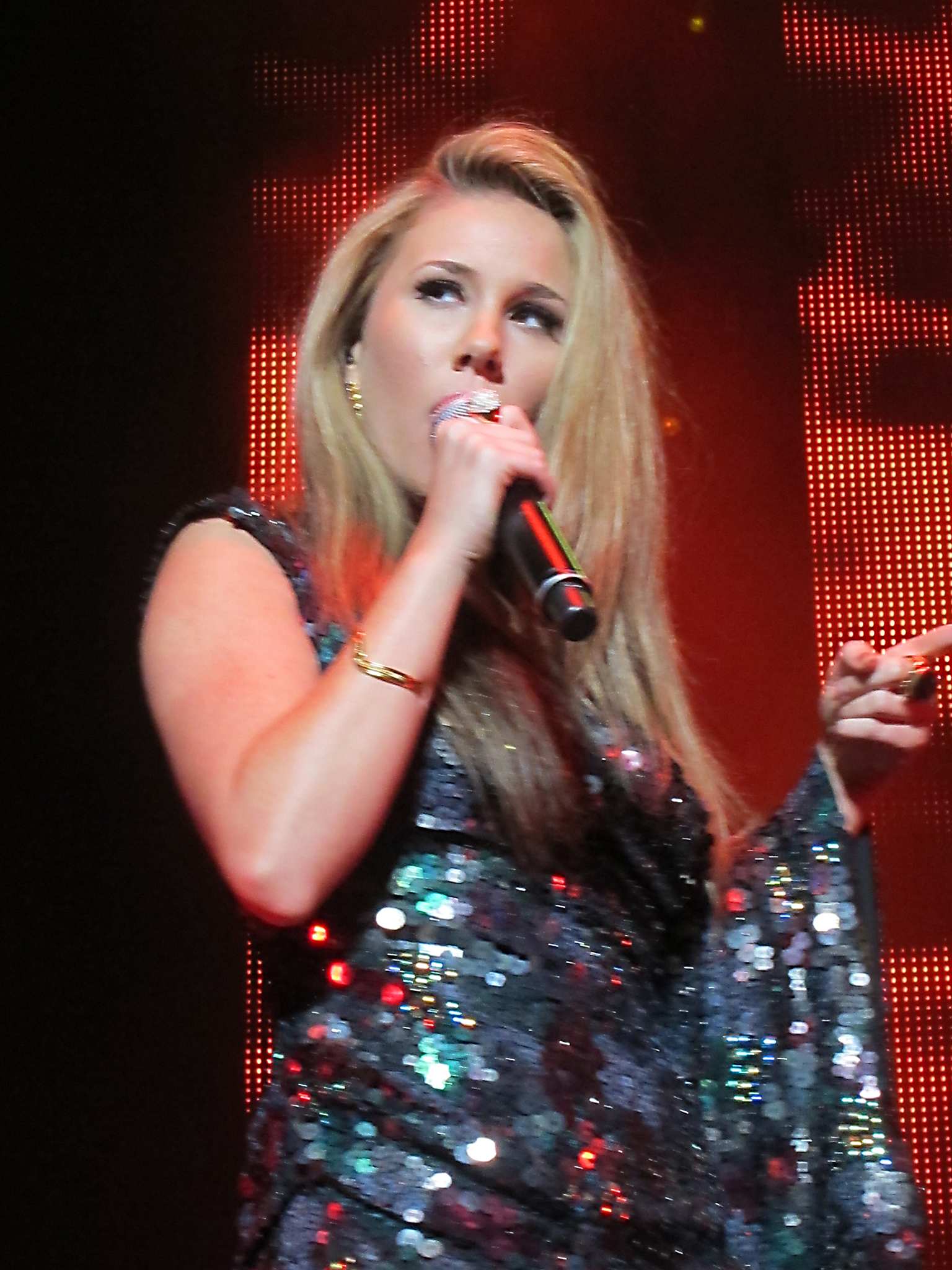
Haley Reinhart

American singer and songwriter Haley Reinhart has released four studio albums, two extended plays, 20 singles (including seven promotional and two featured singles), and has made 18 appearances as a featured or guest vocalist, most notably for her role as a recurring performer with the jazz collective Postmodern Jukebox.

Reinhart's first studio album, Listen Up!, was released on May 22, 2012, following the release of the lead single "Free". After being dropped by her label, Interscope at the end of 2012, Reinhart independently released the single "Show Me Your Moves" in 2014, with the help of crowdfunding website Indiegogo. Her second studio album, Better followed in 2016, being released on April 29. Better spawned the lead single, "Better", as well as Reinhart's most successful single release to date, a cover of the Elvis classic "Can't Help Falling in Love" which was the first promotional single for the album. The single was certified Gold by the Recording Industry Association of America on February 17, 2017.

Reinhart's third studio album, What's That Sound?, was released on September 22, 2017, by Concord Records. The lead single, "Baby It's You", was released on June 16, 2017, followed by "For What It's Worth" on August 11, 2017 and "Let's Start" on September 19, 2017. "The Letter" was also released on July 13, 2017, as a promotional single. Reinhart was a featured collaborator on Irvin Mayfield and Kermit Ruffins's album A Beautiful World, released on October 13, 2017. She sings on the track "Don't Worry, Be Happy" with Jason Marsalis, Cyril Neville and Glen David Andrews, and the title track, "Beautiful World [for Imani]". She also provides uncredited vocals on the song "Mystic", and backing vocals throughout the album.

On May 31, 2018, Refinery29 exclusively debuted the music video for Reinhart's single "Last Kiss Goodbye" before its official release on June 1, 2018. Reinhart joined jazz pianist Jeff Goldblum as a featured singer on his debut album of jazz standards, The Capitol Studios Sessions, which was released on November 9, 2018. She features on the tracks "My Baby Just Cares for Me" and "Gee Baby (Ain't I Good to You)".

Reinhart teamed up with the Dutch electronic dance music duo Vicetone on their single "Something Strange", which was released with its video on November 2, 2018. On September 14, 2018, Reinhart released "Don't Know How to Love You", the lead single from her self-produced fourth studio album, Lo-Fi Soul, which was released independently on March 27, 2019. The title track, "Lo-Fi Soul", was released as the album's second single on February 8, 2019, with the official music video, composed of home footage, debuting on February 15 exclusively by AltPress. The third single, "Honey, There's the Door", was released with its official music video on March 8, 2019.

Reinhart has also had success on the Jazz Digital charts with her releases as part of Postmodern Jukebox. Six of the eight singles released with the band have been in the top 20, including her most successful single, a remake of Radiohead's "Creep", which peaked at number 1 on the chart dated May 25, 2015, and appeared on the chart for 58 consecutive weeks.

As a songwriter, Reinhart has written songs that have appeared on albums by Christina Grimmie, Martina Stoessel, Jennie Lena and Vicetone.

== Studio albums ==
Title	Details	Peak chart positions				Sales
Title	Details	US	US Indie	US Album Sales	CAN	Sales
Listen Up!	Released: May 22, 2012; Label: Interscope/19; Format: CD, digital download	17	—	—	52	US: 77,000 (as of 2016)
Better	Release date: April 29, 2016; Publisher: ole, red dot; Format: CD, digital download	—	22	—	—	US: 7,500
What's That Sound?	Release date: September 22, 2017; Label: Concord Records; Format: CD, LP, digital download	—	—	67	—	
Lo-Fi Soul	Release date: March 27, 2019; Label: Reinhart Records; Format: CD, LP, digital download	—	—	—	—	
"—" denotes an album which failed to chart or was not released to that format.

== Extended plays ==
Title	Details	Peak chart positions		Sales
Title	Details	US	CAN	Sales
American Idol Season 10 Highlights: Haley Reinhart	Release date: June 28, 2011; Label: 19, Interscope; Format: CD, digital download	37	75	US: 59,000
Bulletproof	Release date: June 14, 2019; Label: Self-released; Format: Streaming, digital download	–	–	–
Off the Ground	Release date: September 2, 2022; Label: Reinhart Records; Format: Streaming, digital download	–	–	–

== Singles ==
=== As lead artist ===
Year	Single	Peak chart positions				Sales	Album
Year	Single	US Bub.	US Adult	US Digital	US Jazz	Sales	Album
2012	"Free"	4	26	55	—	US: 61,000	Listen Up!
2014	"Show Me Your Moves"	—	—	—	—		Non-album single
2016	"Better"	—	—	—	—		Better
2017	"Baby It's You"	—	—	—	—		What's That Sound?
2017	"For What It's Worth"	—	—	—	—		What's That Sound?
2017	"Let's Start"	—	—	—	—		What's That Sound?
2018	"Last Kiss Goodbye"	—	—	—	15		Non-album single
2018	"Don't Know How to Love You"	—	—	—	—		Lo-Fi Soul
2019	"Lo-Fi Soul"	—	—	—	—		Lo-Fi Soul
2019	"Honey, There's the Door"	—	—	—	—		Lo-Fi Soul
2019	"Deep Water"	—	—	—	—		Lo-Fi Soul
2020	"Change (Live)"	—	—	—	—		Non-album single
2020	"Piece of My Heart"	—	—	—	—		Non-album single
2023	"Thunderclouds" (with Kris Allen)	—	—	—	—		Non-album single
"—" denotes a recording which failed to chart or was not released to that format.

=== As featured artist ===
Year	Single	Peak chart positions	Sales	Album
Year	Single	US Dance Airplay	Sales	Album
2018	"My Baby Just Cares for Me" (Jeff Goldblum & The Mildred Snitzer Orchestra featuring Haley Reinhart)	—		The Capitol Studios Sessions
2018	"Something Strange" (Vicetone featuring Haley Reinhart)	23		Elements
"—" denotes a recording which failed to chart or was not released to that format.

== Promotional singles ==
Year	Song	Peak chart positions					Sales	Certifications	Album
Year	Song	US Bub.	US AC	US Adult	US Digital	US Holiday	Sales	Certifications	Album
2011	"Baby, It's Cold Outside" with Casey Abrams	20	27	—	—	30	US: 25,000	—	Non-album single
2015	"Can't Help Falling in Love"	—	16	31	48	—	US: 500,000	RIAA: Platinum; MC: 2× Platinum	Better
2017	"The Letter"	—	—	—	—	—			What's That Sound?
2019	"Shook"	—	—	—	—	—			Lo-Fi Soul
2019	"Dreams"	—	—	—	—	—			Non-album single
2019	"Bulletproof"	—	—	—	—	—			Bulletproof
2019	"It Ain't Over 'Till It's Over"	—	—	—	—	—			Bulletproof
2019	"Santa Baby"	—	—	—	—	—			Non-album single
2019	"Have Yourself a Merry Little Christmas"	—	—	—	—	—			Non-album single
2019	"The Christmas Song"	—	—	—	—	—			Non-album single
"—" denotes a recording which failed to chart or was not released to that format.

== Other appearances ==
Year	Title	Other artist(s)	Peak chart positions	Album
Year	Title	Other artist(s)	Jazz Digital	Album
2012	"Hit the Road Jack"	Casey Abrams	—	Casey Abrams
2014	"Leading to One"	AMD (Adreian & Mark Duet)	—	AMD (Adreian & Mark Duet)
2015	"Habits"	Scott Bradlee & Postmodern Jukebox	12	Selfies on Kodachrome
2015	"All About That Bass" (not credited)	Scott Bradlee & Postmodern Jukebox	—	Emoji Antique
2015	"Creep"	Scott Bradlee & Postmodern Jukebox	1	Emoji Antique
2015	"Lovefool"	Scott Bradlee & Postmodern Jukebox	11	Swipe Right for Vintage
2015	"Oops!... I Did It Again"	Scott Bradlee & Postmodern Jukebox	11	Swipe Right for Vintage
2015	"Seven Nation Army"	Scott Bradlee & Postmodern Jukebox	5	Swipe Right for Vintage
2015	"Santa, I Just Want You"	A2	—	Holiday-o-Rama, Vol. 1 (Christmas Collection)
2015	"Mad World" with Puddles Pity Party	Scott Bradlee & Postmodern Jukebox	—	Top Hat on Fleek
2016	"Never Knew What Love Can Do"	Casey Abrams & the Gingerbread Band	—	Tales From the Gingerbread House
2016	"Black Hole Sun"	Scott Bradlee & Postmodern Jukebox	3	Squad Goals
2017	"Don't Worry, Be Happy"	Irvin Mayfield and Kermit Ruffins (with Jason Marsalis, Cyril Neville, and Glen David Andrews)	—	A Beautiful World
2017	"Mystic"	Irvin Mayfield and Kermit Ruffins	—	A Beautiful World
2017	"Beautiful World [for Imani]"	Irvin Mayfield and Kermit Ruffins	—	A Beautiful World
2018	"Gee Baby (Ain't I Good to You)"	Jeff Goldblum & The Mildred Snitzer Orchestra	—	The Capitol Studios Sessions
2023	"Cog in the Machine"	Franklyn Lubsey; Jared Mason; Bay Area Sound	—	I Expect You To Die 3: Cog in the Machine (Official Game Soundtrack)
"—" denotes a recording which failed to chart or was not released to that format.

== Songwriting credits ==
List of songs written for other artists
Artist	Album	Song	Co-written with	Ref
Christina Grimmie	With Love (2013)	"Get Yourself Together"	MoZella and Rune Westberg	
Martina Stoessel	Tini (2016)	"All You Gotta Do"	Justin Johnson, Candy Shields, and James Wong	
Martina Stoessel	Tini (2016)	"Sólo Dime Tu"	Justin Johnson, Candy Shields, and James Wong	
Jennie Lena	Acoustic Sessions (2016)	"Let Yourself Be Beautiful"	Brian Kennedy and Bobby Hamrick	
Vicetone	Elements (2018)	"Something Strange"	Ruben den Boer and Victor Pool	

== Alphabetical list of released songs ==
Key
†	Indicates single release
‡	Indicates song included on an alternative version of the album
•	Indicates songs covered by Reinhart

Title	Artist(s)	Writer(s)	Album	Year	Ref
"All About That Bass" •	Scott Bradlee's Postmodern Jukebox featuring Various Artists	Meghan Trainor; Kevin Kadish	Emoji Antique	2015	
"Baby, It's Cold Outside" •	Haley Reinhart featuring Casey Abrams	Frank Loesser	Non-album single	2011	
"Baby Doll"	Haley Reinhart	Haley Reinhart; Pavel Dovgalyuk; Sidnie Tipton	Lo-Fi Soul	2019	
"Baby It's You" † •	Haley Reinhart	Burt Bacharach; Luther Dixon; Mack David	What's That Sound?	2017	
"Bad Light"	Haley Reinhart	Haley Reinhart; Fabian Ordorica; Jose Lopez; Keithian Sammons	Better	2016	
"Beautiful World [for Imani]"	Kermit Ruffins and Irvin Mayfield featuring Haley Reinhart	N/A	A Beautiful World	2017	
"Behave"	Haley Reinhart	Haley Reinhart; Bhavik Pattani	Better	2016	
"Better" †	Haley Reinhart	Haley Reinhart; Anders Grahn; Alex Reid	Better	2016	
"Black Hole Sun" •	Scott Bradlee's Postmodern Jukebox featuring Haley Reinhart	Chris Cornell	Squad Goals	2016	
"Bring the Love Back Home"	Haley Reinhart featuring Casey Abrams	Casey Abrams; Haley Reinhart; Andy Rose	What's That Sound?	2017	
"Broken Record"	Haley Reinhart	Haley Reinhart; Anders Grahn; Rob Kleiner	Lo-Fi Soul	2019	
"Can't Help Falling in Love" •	Haley Reinhart	Hugo Peretti; Luigi Creatore; George David Weiss	Better	2016	
"Can't Find My Way Home" •	Haley Reinhart	Steve Winwood	What's That Sound?	2017	
"Check Please"	Haley Reinhart	Haley Reinhart; Clare Reynolds; Rob Kleiner	Better	2016	
"Crack the Code"	Haley Reinhart	Haley Reinhart; Anders Grahn; Printz Board	Lo-Fi Soul	2019	
"Creep" •	Scott Bradlee's Postmodern Jukebox featuring Haley Reinhart	Albert Hammond; Mike Hazlewood	Emoji Antique	2015	
"Cog in the Machine"	Haley Reinhart	Bay Area Sound; Frank Lubsey; Jared Mason	From the game I Expect You To Die 3: Cog in the Machine	2023	
"Deep Water"	Haley Reinhart	Haley Reinhart; DJ Kyriakides; Matt Parad	Lo-Fi Soul	2019	
"Don't Know How to Love You" †	Haley Reinhart	Haley Reinhart; Anders Grahn; Rob Kleiner	Lo-Fi Soul	2018	
"Don't Worry, Be Happy" •	Kermit Ruffins and Irvin Mayfield featuring Jason Marsalis, Cyril Neville, Haley Reinhart, And Glen David Andrews	Bobby McFerrin	A Beautiful World	2017	
"Dreams" •	Haley Reinhart	Dolores O'Riordan; Noel Hogan	Non-album single	2019	
"Follow Me (I'm Right Behind You)"	Haley Reinhart	Haley Reinhart; Rob Kleiner; Steve McEwan; Jason Falkner	Listen Up! ‡	2012	
"For What It's Worth" † •	Haley Reinhart	Stephen Stills	What's That Sound?	2017	
"Free" †	Haley Reinhart	Lucie Silvas; Michael Busbee	Listen Up!	2012	
"(Gee Baby) Ain't I Good to You" •	Jeff Goldblum & The Mildred Snitzer Orchestra featuring Haley Reinhart	Andy Razaf; Don Redman	The Capitol Studios Sessions	2018	
"Habits" •	Scott Bradlee's Postmodern Jukebox featuring Haley Reinhart	Tove Nilsson; Ludvig Söderberg; Jakob Jerlström	Selfies on Kodachrome	2015	
"Hit the Ground Runnin"	Haley Reinhart	Haley Reinhart; Mike Elizondo; Aimée Proal; Trevor Lawrence	Listen Up!	2012	
"Hit the Road Jack" •	Casey Abrams featuring Haley Reinhart	Percy Mayfield	Casey Abrams	2012	
"Honey, There's the Door" †	Haley Reinhart	Haley Reinhart; Tony Esterly	Lo-Fi Soul	2019	
"How Dare You"	Haley Reinhart	Haley Reinhart; Rob Kleiner	Lo-Fi Soul	2019	
"I Belong to You"	Haley Reinhart	Haley Reinhart; Alexander Geringas; Clarence Coffee, Jr.	Better	2016	
"Keep Coming Back"	Haley Reinhart	Haley Reinhart; Rob Kleiner; Steve McEwan	Listen Up!	2012	
"Last Kiss Goodbye" †	Haley Reinhart	Haley Reinhart; Anders Grahn	Non-album single	2018	
"Lay It Down"	Haley Reinhart	Haley Reinhart; Andy Rose	Lo-Fi Soul	2019	
"Let's Live for Today" •	Haley Reinhart	Michael Julien; David Shapiro; Giulio Rapetti	What's That Sound? ‡	2017	
"Let's Start" †	Haley Reinhart	Anders Grahn; Haley Reinhart; Rob Kleiner	What's That Sound?	2017	
"Let's Run Away"	Haley Reinhart	Haley Reinhart; Blake Carter; Lauren Christy	Listen Up! ‡	2012	
"The Letter" •	Haley Reinhart	Wayne Carson	What's That Sound?	2017	
"Liar"	Haley Reinhart	Haley Reinhart; Rob Kleiner; Sam Watters	Listen Up!	2012	
"Light My Fire" •	Haley Reinhart	Jim Morrison; Robbie Krieger; John Densmore; Ray Manzarek	What's That Sound? ‡	2017	
"Listen"	Haley Reinhart	Haley Reinhart; Anders Grahn; Maria Marcus	Better	2016	
"Lo-Fi Soul" †	Haley Reinhart	Haley Reinhart; Rob Kleiner	Lo-Fi Soul	2019	
"Love is Worth Fighting For"	Haley Reinhart	Haley Reinhart; Clare Reynolds	Better	2016	
"Lovefool" •	Scott Bradlee's Postmodern Jukebox featuring Haley Reinhart	Peter Svensson; Nina Persson	Swipe Right for Vintage	2015	
"Mad World" •	Scott Bradlee's Postmodern Jukebox featuring Haley Reinhart and Puddles Pity Party	Roland Orzabal	Top Hat on Fleek	2015	
"My Baby Just Cares for Me" † •	Jeff Goldblum & The Mildred Snitzer Orchestra featuring Haley Reinhart	Walter Donaldson; Gus Kahn	The Capitol Studios Sessions	2018	
"My Cake"	Haley Reinhart	Haley Reinhart; Fabian Ordorica; Jose Lopez; Keithian Sammons	Better	2016	
"Mystic"	Kermit Ruffins and Irvin Mayfield featuring Haley Reinhart (uncredited)	N/A	A Beautiful World	2017	
"Never Knew What Love Can Do"	Casey Abrams featuring Haley Reinhart	—N/a	Tales from the Gingerbread House - EP	2016	
"Now That You're Here"	Haley Reinhart	Haley Reinhart; Chris DeStefano; Sam Watters	Listen Up!	2012	
"Oh Damn"	Haley Reinhart	Haley Reinhart; Gavin Slate; Tony Esterly	Lo-Fi Soul	2019	
"Oh! Darling" •	Haley Reinhart featuring Scott Bradlee	John Lennon; Paul McCartney	What's That Sound?	2017	
"Oh My!"	Haley Reinhart featuring B.o.B	Haley Reinhart; Rob Kleiner; MoZella; Bobby Ray Simmons, Jr.	Listen Up!	2012	
"Oops!... I Did It Again" •	Scott Bradlee's Postmodern Jukebox featuring Haley Reinhart	Max Martin; Rami Yacoub	Swipe Right for Vintage	2015	
"Santa, I Just Want You"	A2 featuring Haley Reinhart	Alex Zamm; Alex Geringas	Holiday-o-Rama, Vol. 1	2015	
"Seven Nation Army" •	Scott Bradlee's Postmodern Jukebox featuring Haley Reinhart	Jack White	Swipe Right for Vintage	2015	
"Shook"	Haley Reinhart	Haley Reinhart; Clare Reynolds; Tony Esterly	Lo-Fi Soul	2019	
"Show Me Your Moves" †	Haley Reinhart	—N/a	Non-album single	2014	
"Something Strange" †	Vicetone featuring Haley Reinhart	Haley Reinhart; Ruben den Boer; Victor Pool	Elements	2018	
"Some Way Some How"	Haley Reinhart	Haley Reinhart; David Bollmann; Satasha Torres; Stephen Lee	Lo-Fi Soul	2019	
"Somewhere in Between"	Haley Reinhart	Anders Grahn; Haley Reinhart; Rob Kleiner	What's That Sound?	2017	
"Spiderweb"	Haley Reinhart	Haley Reinhart; David Hodges; Steven Miller	Listen Up! ‡	2012	
"Strange World"	Haley Reinhart	Haley Reinhart; Clare Reynolds; Rob Kleiner	Lo-Fi Soul	2019	
"Sunny Afternoon" •	Haley Reinhart featuring Scott Bradlee	Ray Davies	What's That Sound?	2017	
"Talkin' About"	Haley Reinhart	Haley Reinhart; Anders Grahn; Justin Gray	Better	2016	
"These Boots Are Made For Walkin'" •	Haley Reinhart	Lee Hazlewood	What's That Sound?	2017	
"Time of the Season" •	Haley Reinhart featuring Casey Abrams	Rod Argent; Paul Atkinson; Colin Blunstone; Hugh Grundy; Chris White	What's That Sound?	2017	
"Undone"	Haley Reinhart	Haley Reinhart; MoZella; Rune Westberg	Listen Up!	2012	
"Walking on Heaven"	Haley Reinhart	Haley Reinhart; Mike Elizondo; Aimée Proal; Trevor Lawrence Jr.	Listen Up!	2012	
"Wasted Tears"	Haley Reinhart	Haley Reinhart; Michael Busbee; Jonathan Green	Listen Up!	2012	
"What You Don't Know"	Haley Reinhart	Haley Reinhart; Sam Watters; Michael Busbee	Listen Up! ‡	2012	
"White Rabbit" •	Haley Reinhart	Grace Slick	What's That Sound?	2017	
"Wonderland"	Haley Reinhart	Haley Reinhart; Chris Seefried	Listen Up!	2012	
"Words of Love" •	Haley Reinhart featuring Scott Bradlee	John Phillips	What's That Sound?	2017	
"You Showed Me" •	Haley Reinhart	Gene Clark; Roger McGuinn	What's That Sound?	2017	
