= Haley Reinhart videography =

American singer and songwriter who appeared on the 10th season of American Idol

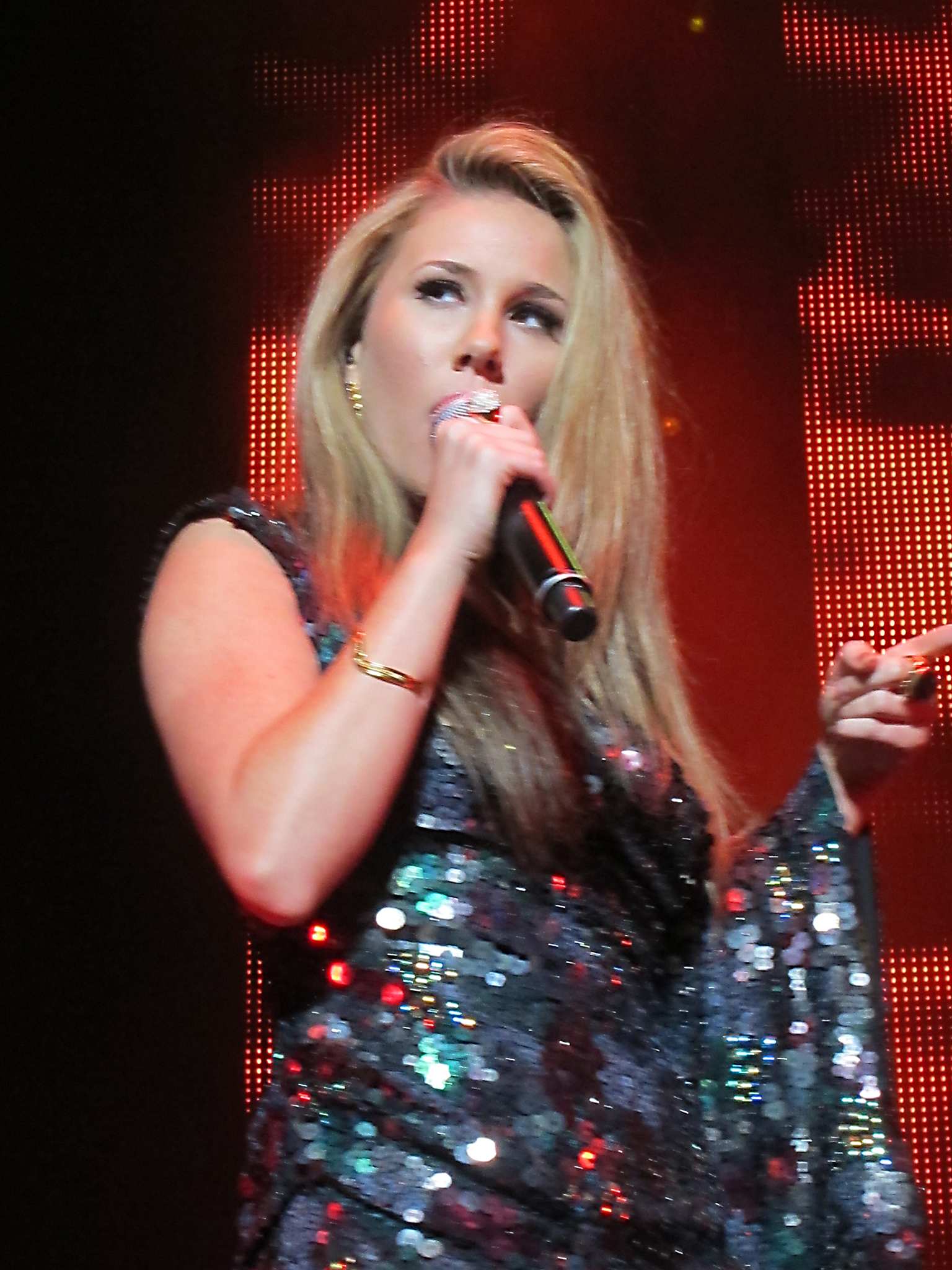
Reinhart in July 2011

American singer and songwriter Haley Reinhart has been featured in seventeen music videos and eight television series or specials. Reinhart garnered widespread attention for her Jazz fusion and Rock styles when she appeared on the tenth season of American Idol.

Reinhart and fellow Idol contestant Casey Abrams released a promotional cover of the Christmas standard "Baby, It's Cold Outside" in late 2011, after attaining positive reception for the jazz duets sung by the pair on Idol. In 2012, Reinhart released her debut studio album Listen Up!, with the release of the music video for the single "Free". In 2014, she released the music video for the single "Show Me Your Moves" that was made possible with the help of an Indiegogo crowdfunding campaign. In 2015, she released a promotional music video for the song "Can't Help Falling In Love" for her second studio album, which was featured in the Extra gum commercial "The Story of Sarah and Juan" and received viral recognition. In 2016, Reinhart released her second studio album, Better, along with the release of the music video for the lead single "Better". In 2017, Reinhart released music videos for her songs "Baby It's You" and "The Letter" as promotion for her third studio album, What's That Sound. In August 2017, Reinhart released a lyric video to support the release of the album's third single, "For What It's Worth".

Reinhart has appeared in various television series since her debut on American Idol, which includes being a musical guest on the show in later seasons. She is currently the voice of Bill Murphy in the animated Netflix series, F Is for Family.

== Music videos ==
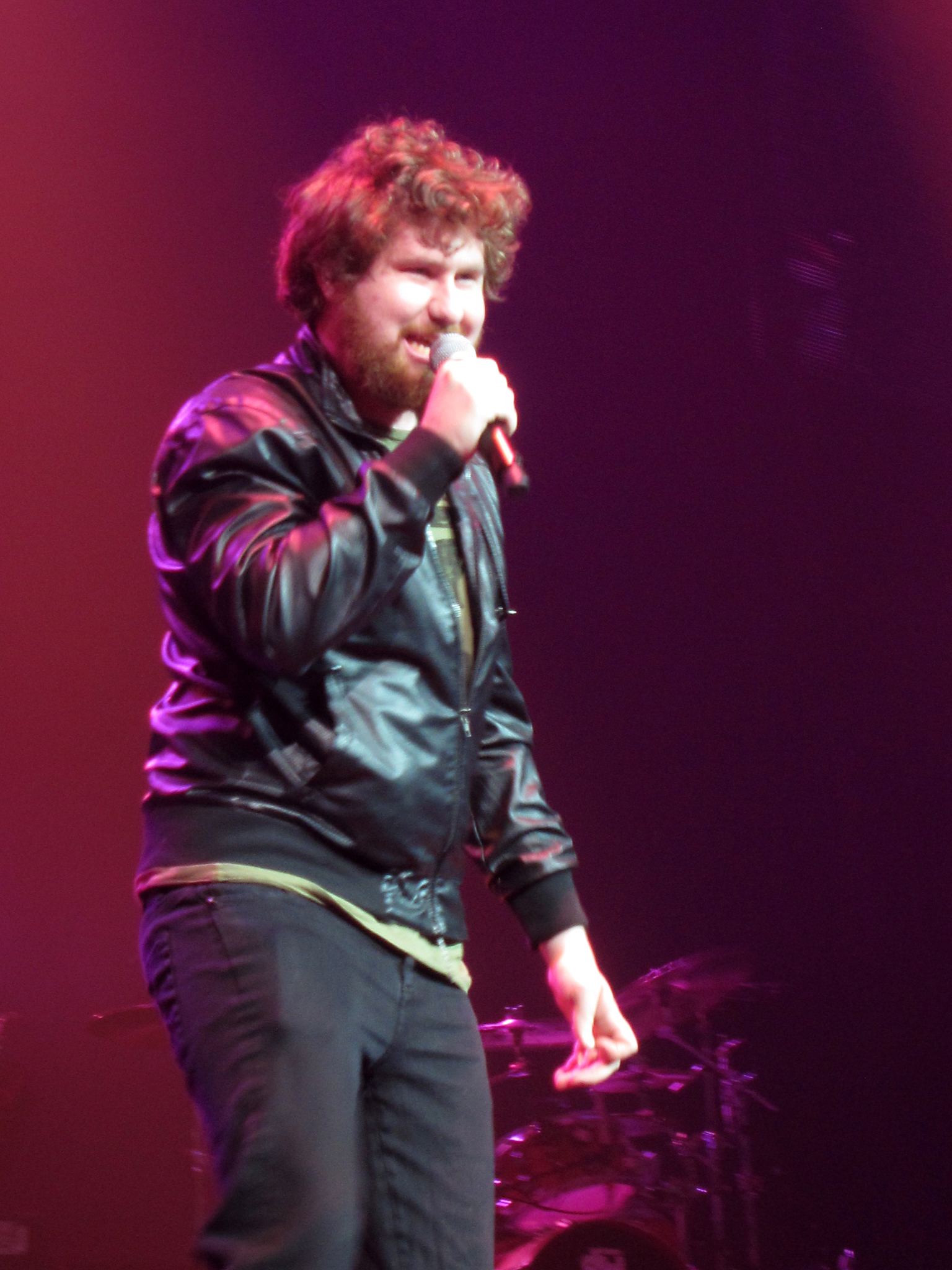
Casey Abrams was featured in the "Baby, It's Cold Outside" video.

Title	Year	Other credited performer(s)	Description	Ref.
"Baby, It's Cold Outside"	2011	Casey Abrams	A promotional single with fellow American Idol contestant, capitalizing on their unique jazz sound that was highlighted together on the show.	
"Free"	2012	None	Set in a darkened diner, the music video officially premiered as a promotional single for the album Listen Up! on Thursday, March 29.	
"Show Me Your Moves"	2014	None	A space themed video that was released July 30 and was made possible by her fans and the crowdfunding website Indiegogo.	
"Can't Help Falling in Love"	2015	None	A promotional music video for Reinhart's second studio album, Better.	
"Better"	2016	None	A promotional music video for Reinhart's second studio album, Better.	
"Baby It's You"	2017	None	A promotional music video for Reinhart's third studio album, What's That Sound.	
"The Letter"	2017	None	A promotional music video for Reinhart's third studio album, What's That Sound.	
"For What It's Worth"	2017	None	A promotional lyric video for Reinhart's third studio album, What's That Sound.	
"Let's Start"	2017	None	A promotional music video for Reinhart's third studio album, What's That Sound.	
"Last Kiss Goodbye"	2018	None	A promotional music video for Reinhart's single, "Last Kiss Goodbye".	
"Don't Know How to Love You"	2018	None	A promotional music video for Reinhart's single, "Don't Know How to Love You".	
"My Baby Just Cares for Me"	2018	Jeff Goldblum & The Mildred Snitzer Orchestra	A promotional music video for Reinhart and Jeff Goldblum's single, "My Baby Just Cares for Me".	
"Something Strange"	2018	Vicetone	A promotional music video for Reinhart and Vicetone's single, "Something Strange".	
"Lo-Fi Soul"	2019	None	A promotional music video for Reinhart's single, "Lo-Fi Soul".	
"Honey, There's the Door"	2019	None	A promotional music video for Reinhart's single, "Honey, There's the Door".	
"Shook"	2019	None	A promotional music video for Reinhart's fourth studio album, Lo-Fi Soul.	
"Deep Water"	2019	None	A promotional music video for Reinhart's single, "Deep Water".	

== Film ==
Year	Title	Role	Studio	Notes	Ref.
2020	We Can Be Heroes	Ms. Vox	Netflix	Film debut	
2022	Americana	Sue		Short Film	

== Television ==
Year	Title	Role	Network	Notes	Ref.
2011	American Idol	Herself	Fox	Season ten contestant	
2012	Hell's Kitchen	Herself	Fox	Blue kitchen chef's table guest Episode: "10 Chefs Compete"	
2012	American Idol	Herself	Fox	Season eleven musical guest	
2012	90210	Herself	The CW	Performer; Episode: "Blue Ivy"	
2013	Real Music Live	Herself	NBC	Performer; Announcer	
2015–2021	F Is for Family	Bill Murphy / Young Frank Murphy (season 4)	Netflix	Voice acting Season 1, recurring (6 episodes); Season 2—Season 5, main cast (38 episodes)	
2016	American Idol	Herself	Fox	Season fifteen performer and mentor	
2018	The 2018 Rock & Roll Hall of Fame Induction Ceremony Red Carpet Live	Herself	HBO	Attendee	
2018	Jimmy Kimmel Live!	Herself	ABC	American Idol Reunion Skit Performer; Episode: "Matthew McConaughey/Julian Dennison/James Bay"	
2018	Jimmy Kimmel Live!	Herself	ABC	Musical Guest; Episode: "Anthony Anderson/Sebastian Stan/Jeff Goldblum"	
2019	America Salutes You: Guitar Legends II	Herself	AXS TV	Performer	
2019	Front and Center S9E06: Robby Kreiger and Friends	Herself	PBS	Performer	
