= Something Strange (disambiguation) =

"Something Strange" is a pop-house song by Vicetone featuring Haley Reinhart.

Something Strange may also refer to:

- "Something Strange", a song by Australian rock band Sticky Fingers, from Westway (The Glitter & the Slums)
- "Something Strange", a song by Baby Face Willete from Face to Face (Baby Face Willette album)
