= What's That Sound? =

Studio album by Haley Reinhart
- Released: September 22, 2017
- Recorded: 2016–17
- Studio: Sunset Sound Recorders; The Village
- Genre: Rock; traditional pop
- Length: 46:26
- Label: Concord Records
- Producer: John Burk, Haley Reinhart

Haley Reinhart chronology
Better (2016)	What's That Sound? (2017)	Lo-Fi Soul (2019)

Singles from What's That Sound?
- 1. "Baby It's You" Released: 2017; 2. "For What It's Worth" Released: 2017; 3. "Let's Start" Released: 2017

What's That Sound? is the third studio album by American music artist Haley Reinhart, released on September 22, 2017 by Concord Records, and produced by Reinhart and John Burk. An homage to music from the late 1960s, it features 14 tracks on the standard release, with two bonus tracks on the Target exclusive edition.

Lead single "Baby It's You" was released June 16, 2017, followed by "For What It's Worth" on August 11, 2017 and "Let's Start" on September 15, 2017. "The Letter" was also released on July 13, 2017, as a promotional single. The album debuted at 67 on Billboard's Top Album Sales Chart.

== Production ==
Concord first pitched the idea of Reinhart doing a covers album. Reinhart agreed since her deepest memories are of classic rock songs in the repertoire of her parents' 1960s cover band, Midnight. The result, What's That Sound, features most of her favorite classic-rock and pop songs, all of which were originally released between the years of 1967 and 1969.

What's That Sound? was recorded to tape at Sunset Sound Recorders using analog recording and vintage instruments, to achieve a sound "true to the era." Each song on the album was recorded live in the studio as a band, and most of the raw takes were kept for finalized tracks. The album was produced by Concord President John Burk and co-produced by Reinhart. Bill Schnee mixed the album, Reinhart's father, Harry, provided guitar, Reinhart's mother, Patti, sang backup vocals, Scott Bradlee played piano for three tracks, while Casey Abrams was featured vocalist on two tracks and instrumentalist on several others. With the album, Reinhart wanted to draw connections between the 1960s and the present day, describing both as "turbulent, yet hopeful times," and she also wanted to spread the idea of "people coming together through love and music" and hopes that the album will help listeners "become more aware and more in tune with each other."

== Commercial performance ==
What's That Sound? debuted at 67 on Billboard's Top Album Sales chart, for the week dated October 14, 2017.

== Promotion ==
=== 2017 fall headlining solo tour ===
In support of the album, Reinhart embarked on an 18-show headlining fall tour throughout the US, commencing October 22, 2017, and concluding November 18, 2017.

Date	City	Country	Venue
October 22, 2017	Phoenix	United States	Crescent Ballroom
October 24, 2017	Los Angeles	United States	El Rey Theatre
October 26, 2017	Solana Beach	United States	Belly Up
October 27, 2017	San Francisco	United States	Great American Music Hall
October 29, 2017	Portland	United States	Lola's Room
October 30, 2017	Seattle	United States	Chop Suey
November 1, 2017	Salt Lake City	United States	Urban Lounge
November 2, 2017	Denver	United States	Bluebird Theater
November 4, 2017	Minneapolis	United States	Music Hall Mpls.
November 5, 2017	Chicago	United States	Lincoln Hall
November 6, 2017	Detroit	United States	The Shelter
November 9, 2017	New York City	United States	Highline Ballroom
November 10, 2017	Philadelphia	United States	World Café Live
November 12, 2017	Allston	United States	Brighton Music Hall
November 13, 2017	Silver Spring	United States	The Fillmore Silver Spring
November 14, 2017	Baltimore	United States	Soundstage
November 16, 2017	Charlotte	United States	The Underground
November 18, 2017	Atlanta	United States	Aisle 5

== Track listing ==
All songs and credits adapted from:

No.	Title	Writer(s)	Original artist	Length
1.	"Let's Start"	Anders Grahn / Haley Reinhart / Rob Kleiner	Haley Reinhart	3:39
2.	"Baby It's You"	Burt Bacharach / Mack David / Barney Williams	The Shirelles	3:40
3.	"For What It's Worth"	Stephen Stills	Buffalo Springfield	3:23
4.	"The Letter"	Wayne Carson	Boxtops	2:23
5.	"Can't Find My Way Home"	Steve Winwood	Blind Faith	3:58
6.	"White Rabbit"	Grace Slick	Jefferson Airplane	2:43
7.	"Somewhere in Between"	Grahn / Reinhart / Kleiner	Haley Reinhart	3:31
8.	"Oh! Darling" (feat. Scott Bradlee)	John Lennon / Paul McCartney	The Beatles	3:15
9.	"Sunny Afternoon" (feat. Scott Bradlee)	Ray Davies	The Kinks	4:21
10.	"You Showed Me"	Gene Clark / Roger McGuinn	The Turtles	3:03
11.	"Words of Love" (feat. Scott Bradlee)	John Phillips	The Mamas and the Papas	2:18
12.	"Bring the Love Back Home" (feat. Casey Abrams)	Casey Abrams / Reinhart / Andy Rose	Haley Reinhart (feat. Casey Abrams)	3:52
13.	"Time of the Season" (feat. Casey Abrams)	Rod Argent / Paul Atkinson / Colin Blunstone / Hugh Grundy / Chris White	The Zombies	3:20
14.	"These Boots Are Made for Walkin'"	Lee Hazlewood	Nancy Sinatra	2:56
Total length:				46:26

What's That Sound? Target edition (bonus tracks)
No.	Title	Writer(s)	Original artist	Length
15.	"Light My Fire"	Jim Morrison / Robbie Krieger / John Densmore / Ray Manzarek	The Doors	3:36
16.	"Let's Live for Today"	Michael Julien / David Shapiro / Giulio Rapetti	The Grass Roots	3:26
Total length:				53:28

== Personnel ==
Album credits adapted from:

- Haley Reinhart: Composer, producer, Vocals, Background Vocals
- Casey Abrams: Bass (Upright), Featured Artist, Melodica, Vocals, Background Vocals
- Paul Blakemore: Mastering
- Scott Bradlee: Featured Artist, Piano
- John Burk: Producer, Guitar
- George Doering: Guitar
- Thomas Drayton: Background Vocals
- Anders Grahn: Bass, composer, Congas, Guitar, Keyboards, Background Vocals
- Martin Guigui: Hammond B3, Keyboards, Piano
- Rob Kleiner: Additional Production, composer
- Monika Lightstone: Photography
- Mike Merritt: Bass
- Seth Present: Engineer
- Harry Reinhart: Guitar
- Patti Reinhart: Background Vocals
- Bill Schnee: Engineer, Mixing
- Mike Shapiro: Drums, Percussion
- Carrie Smith: Cover Design
- Morgan Stratton: Assistant Engineer
- Sean Winter: Package Design

== Charts ==
Chart (2017)	Peak position
US Top Album Sales	67
