= Free (Haley Reinhart song) =

Single by Haley Reinhart

from the album Listen Up!
- Released: March 20, 2012
- Recorded: Summer 2011
- Genre: Pop
- Length: 4:14
- Label: Interscope
- Songwriters: Lucie Silvas; busbee
- Producer: busbee

Haley Reinhart singles chronology
"Free" (2012)	"Show Me Your Moves" (2014)

"Free" is the debut single by American Idol tenth season third-place finisher Haley Reinhart. It was released on March 20, 2012 through Interscope Records and serves as the first single from her debut album, Listen Up!.

== Composition ==
The song is a "mature break-up song", as defined by the singer itself, which tells the story about two people in love whose relationship fails and decide to break-up since it is the best for both.

== Critical reception ==
Critics gave "Free" positive reviews. About.com said "This is clearly a Haley Reinhart record, and her fans will instantly take it to heart." and gave it a rating of 4.5 out of 5. USA Today's Brian Mansfield was impressed and the song was picked to be one of the songs in the Playlist in USA Today. Scott Shetler from PopCrush.com wrote "The track is built around the elegant vocals of Reinhart, who sounds more mature than her twenty-one years [sic] Let’s hope so, because ‘Free’ is a song that’s worthy of people’s attention."

== Music video ==
The music video, which was directed by Christopher Sims, saw its video premiere on March 29, 2012 on VEVO. Sims set the video in a vintage 1950s diner called Cadillac Jack's Cafe in Hollywood, California. It reached 1,000,000 views in under 2 months. It had accumulated 5.5 million views as of September 17h, 2021.

== Live performances ==
Reinhart performed the single live on the March 22, 2012 episode of American Idol. She sang the song live for 104.3 MYFM New Music Night. She also performed the single for the March 27 episode of 90210, Right after, she performed the song on Fox 5's Good Day New York and appeared on Conan to perform the single on April 24.

== Track listing ==
- Digital Download
1. "Free" – 4:14

== Charts ==
Chart (2012)	Peak position
US Bubbling Under Hot 100 Singles (Billboard)	4
US Adult Pop Songs (Billboard)	26
US Heatseekers Songs (Billboard)	19
