= Better (Haley Reinhart song) =

Single by Haley Reinhart

from the album Better
- Released: April 8, 2016
- Recorded: February 23, 2015
- Genre: Pop; rock; funk; soul; blues
- Length: 3:40
- Label: red dot (independent) ole (publisher)
- Songwriter(s): Haley Reinhart, Anders Grahn, Alex Reid
- Producer(s): Anders Grahn

Haley Reinhart singles chronology
| "Can't Help Falling in Love" (2015) | "Better" (2016) |

"Better" is the lead single from American singer Haley Reinhart's sophomore album, Better. It was written by Reinhart in collaboration with Alex Reid and Anders Grahn and produced by Grahn. The single was released on April 8, 2016, through music publishers ole and red dot. The single received positive reviews from critics upon release, notably for its production and Reinhart's vocal performance.

== Composition ==
Reinhart wrote the song in collaboration with Alex Reid and Anders Grahn and recorded at Westlake Recording Studios on February 23, 2015. Grahn also served as the track's producer.

Of the song, Reinhart states "it's all about taking a stand and doing what's right for you. No one should ever just settle in this life or undergo any sort of torment when they can live free. Sometimes everyone, including myself, needs a reminder of the power they possess over their destiny." She noted that her inspiration for writing the song was for "everyone to know their worth. The truth is, if we love and respect ourselves, then we project that same kind of love to those around us. There's always time to make a change in our lives and I hope that women will feel confident, beautiful, united, and reassured when they hear this song."

== Critical reception ==
Critics gave "Better" positive reviews upon release. Ella Ceron of Teen Vogue described the song as "a jam that fuses all of the best elements of good, old-fashioned rock song — that guitar! the piano! — with Haley's wonderfully raspy voice." Mike Waas of Idolator also praised the song, noting it for being "surprisingly raw and bluesy." Gabi Bruckner of Tongue Tied Mag also provided a positive review for the song, stating that the track "showcases a far more rebellious but also pungent Haley. With a rough edge, it screams this empowerment flavor that continues be one of the album’s underlying themes."

== Music video ==
The music video for "Better" premiered through Billboard on April 27, 2016. Directed by Casey Curry, the video features shots of Haley standing and singing the words to the song in front of various backdrops, such as the ocean, and wearing various retro-style outfits. These stills of Reinhart are interspersed with footage of her performing on a rooftop, backed by her full band. Of the video, Reinhart described "I took it to the rooftops with a live band, brought in my personal wardrobe and continued the floral theme -- as seen in the album artwork. Casey Curry really helped bring my vision to life. I wanted it to be simple, sexy, playful and real. Forget the bells and whistles! I feel the vibe, the music and the personality should shine through & speak for itself."

== Track listing ==
- Digital Download
1. "Better" – 3:40
