= Better (Haley Reinhart album) =

Studio album by Haley Reinhart
- Released: April 29, 2016
- Recorded: 2012–16
- Genre: Pop; funk rock; soul; R&B; jazz fusion
- Length: 39:19
- Label: Red Dot (independent); Ole (publisher); ADA (distributor)
- Producer: Jose Lopez; Fabian Ordorica; Bhavik "Kingstarr" Pattani; Haley Reinhart; Casey Abrams; Rob Kleiner; Anders Grahn; James Flannigan; Justin Gray; Sir Charles Prince; Alex Geringas; Maria Marcus

Haley Reinhart chronology
Listen Up! (2012)	Better (2016)	What's That Sound? (2017)

Singles from Better
- 1. "Better" Released: April 8, 2016

Better is the second studio album by American singer and songwriter Haley Reinhart. It was released on April 29, 2016 by music publishers Ole and Red Dot. Reinhart's cover of Elvis Presley's "Can't Help Falling in Love" was released as the album's first promotional single on October 9, 2015. The lead single, "Better", was released on April 8, 2016, the same day that the album became available for pre-order. The album was met with positive reviews from critics, who praised its production, its fusion of genres and eras, Reinhart's voice and personality, and the album's overall message of empowerment. Better debuted at number 22 on the Independent Albums chart and sold 7,500 units in its first two weeks of release.

== Production ==
Better began as an initial six-track EP which was recorded at Westlake Recording Studios in February 2015 with financial support from ole publishing company. After being delayed several times throughout 2015, Reinhart announced that the EP would instead be expanded into her full-length second LP with a release date in spring 2016.

The album included tracks that were written as demos several years ago and newer tracks, including her cover of "Can't Help Falling in Love." The first song Reinhart wrote for Better, "I Belong to You," is her favorite song from the album. She utilized original productions and fused them with cuts from a live band to produce a final product "with a powerful, meaty foundation" and material "that people will relate to". Reinhart composed five songs with Swedish songwriter Anders Grahn, and her father provided guitar for the album. Reinhart had a lot of production control over the album, specifying "I feel I've grown as an artist in terms of songwriting and I've really put my producing skills into practice. I was really meticulous about every nuance of the production, so I'm really proud of this record."

The album includes themes of confidence and progress; Reinhart states "even in a lot of the artwork I'm doing, I have roses represented throughout all the photos. I wanted to tie in something that represents growth and evolution. A rose is constantly growing, blooming, flourishing.” Additionally, she describes Better as a "sultry" mix of funk and rock with a soulful foundation that is crafted to inspire self-confidence and independence in young women, especially through the song "Better."

== Singles ==
Reinhart's cover of "Can't Help Falling in Love" was released as the album's first promotional single on October 9, 2015 after being used in a commercial for Extra Gum. The video amassed 18,000,000 views on YouTube and 88,000,000 views on Facebook. The single debuted at number 25 on the Billboard Adult Contemporary chart dated January 16, 2016. The song peaked at number 31 on Billboard's Adult Top 40 chart.

The title track was released as the album's lead single on April 8, 2016.

=== Other songs ===
The album's second track, "Behave," premiered as a "teaser track" on Idolator on April 25, 2016, four days before the album release.

== Critical reception ==
Jason Scott of Popdust praised the album, which, "packed to the brim with 11 soul-inspired, Motown-fused tracks, is a kind of greatness which forges career-defining moments in time." He also lauded Reinhart for the "placement of her growl and finesse (mostly) above the production, licensing her the freedom to color outside the lines in breathtaking ways." He noted the songs "My Cake," "Can’t Help Falling in Love," "Check Please," "Better," and "Love Is Worth Fighting For" as highlights from the album, rating it overall at four out of five stars. Gabi Bruckner of Tongue Tied Mag provided a positive review, praising Reinhart for her infusion of retro styles into the album. Of the beginning tracks "My Cake" and "Behave," Bruckner noted, "these two tracks side by side allow the album to build in the retro and pop glamour vibe it's destined to unfold towards the latter," adding that "'Bad Light' follows this direction of rebellious, rock influenced vocals with sweet harmonies and jagged attitude." Overall, Bruckner lauded the album for the "empowerment flavor that continues to be one of the album's underlying themes." Emily Tan of MySpace included the album in her list of the "Top 5 Album Releases of the Week" for April 29. She praised the album as a showcase of Reinhart's personality, stating "she's not only bringing the sass but also the funk." She also noted, "throwing in jazzy scats and strong belts, the 25-year-old pop singer walks the fine line of a vintage sound and something a bit more modern." Jacob Elyachar of Jake's Take praised Reinhart's "innate ability to blend multiple musical genres together" and gave the album an A+ rating overall.

== Commercial performance ==
Better debuted at number 22 on Billboard's Independent Albums chart dated May 21, 2016. The album sold 7,500 units within its first two weeks of release.

== Promotion ==
=== Live performances ===
Throughout 2014, Reinhart performed several small-scale gigs, debuting many of the album tracks in her performances at Room 5 Lounge in Los Angeles. In July 2015, she opened for The Rigs at The Troubadour in West Hollywood, California, performing covers and original material from Better. On March 18, 2016, Reinhart performed in Austin, Texas for Mix 94.7 during SXSW as part of the "West of the Fest" venue. On April 30, 2016, Reinhart held an album release and benefit concert at Durty Nellie's Pub in Palatine, Illinois for the development of multimedia sexual abuse prevention curriculum for the PAVE and Erin's Law organizations. Of the show, Reinhart stated:

"the new album is going to be released the day before, so it's going to be a big homecoming on lots of levels. I'm also going to have my parents' band backing me up for that show, which is going to be great. And the cause itself is something I've really wanted to put energy and time into since I was a young girl. Plus, April happens to be Sexual Assault awareness month. I'm just happy to be a part of it."

=== Radio promotion tour ===
In mid-February 2016, Reinhart launched a nationwide radio promotion tour to support the success of "Can't Help Falling in Love." Several 2016 dates were released for preliminary venues located throughout the United States. Reinhart performed at The Hard Rock Cafe in Denver on February 17 for Mix 100. She performed at Mix 96.9's Broken Hearts Ball concert event in Scottsdale, Arizona on February 19 and at the Acoustic Cafe for 96.5 Tic FM in Hartford, Connecticut on March 14.

=== 2016 Better summer solo tour ===
On March 28, 2016, Reinhart officially confirmed a US summer solo tour in support of the album, with an initial 17 dates announced throughout the month of June. On May 25, 2016, Reinhart announced a European leg for her tour, which consists of an additional 16 dates throughout the months of September and October. The European leg was subsequently postponed until spring of 2017, with some dates rescheduled to May and June 2016 and many others cancelled due to rescheduling conflicts.

Date	City	Country	Venue
North America
June 3, 2016	Petaluma	United States	Mystic Theatre
June 4, 2016	San Francisco	United States	Great American Music Hall
June 6, 2016	Los Angeles	United States	El Rey Theatre
June 7, 2016	Solana Beach	United States	Belly Up
June 9, 2016	Phoenix	United States	Crescent Ballroom
June 11, 2016	Denver	United States	Bluebird Theater
June 13, 2016	Minneapolis	United States	Varsity Theater
June 14, 2016	Chicago	United States	Lincoln Hall
June 15, 2016	Columbus	United States	A&R Music Bar
June 17, 2016	Detroit	United States	Saint Andrew's Hall
June 18, 2016	Pittsburgh	United States	Stage AE
June 19, 2016	Philadelphia	United States	World Café Live
June 21, 2016	Washington, D.C.	United States	The Hamilton
June 22, 2016	New York City	United States	Gramercy Theatre
June 23, 2016	Boston	United States	Brighton Music Hall
June 25, 2016	Bay Shore	United States	Boulton Center for the Performing Arts
June 26, 2016	Asbury Park	United States	House of Independents
Europe
May 24, 2017	Warsaw	Poland	Stodola (Open Stage)
May 25, 2017	Berlin	Germany	Musik & Frieden
May 26, 2017	Amsterdam	Netherlands	Bitterzoet
May 27, 2017	Zürich	Switzerland	Moods
May 29, 2017	Paris	France	Le Divan du Monde
May 30, 2017	London	United Kingdom	O2 Academy Islington
May 31, 2017	Birmingham	United Kingdom	The Glee Club
June 2, 2017	Manchester	United Kingdom	Gorilla
June 3, 2017	Glasgow	United Kingdom	Oran Mor
June 5, 2017	Dublin	Ireland	Whelan's

== Track listing ==
Initial writing credits sourced from: and writing and production sourced from:

No.	Title	Writer(s)	Producer(s)	Length
1.	"My Cake"	Haley Reinhart; Fabian Ordorica; Jose Lopez; Keithian Sammons	Lopez; Ordorica	2:58
2.	"Behave"	Reinhart; Bhavik "Kingstarr" Pattani	Pattani	3:11
3.	"Better"	Reinhart; Anders Grahn; Alex Reid	Grahn	3:38
4.	"Can't Help Falling in Love"	George David Weiss; Hugo Peretti; Luigi Creatore	Reinhart; Casey Abrams	2:53
5.	"Check Please"	Reinhart; Clare Reynolds; Rob Kleiner	Kleiner	3:29
6.	"Bad Light"	Reinhart; Grahn; James Flannigan; Adam Erhrlich	Flannigan; Grahn	3:41
7.	"Talkin' About"	Reinhart; Grahn; Justin Gray	Gray	3:19
8.	"Good or Bad"	Reinhart; Grahn	Grahn	3:49
9.	"Love Is Worth Fighting For"	Reinhart; Reynolds	Sir Charles Prince	4:00
10.	"I Belong To You"	Reinhart; Alex Geringas; Clarence Coffee, Jr.	Geringas	4:18
11.	"Listen"	Reinhart; Grahn; Maria Marcus	Marcus	4:03

== Personnel ==
- Zooby Media - art direction and album design
- Casey Curry - photography
- Rob Cohen - recording engineer
- Sean Gould - mixing engineer
- Joao Carvalho - mastering engineer
- Sir Charles Prince - live session producer
- Haley Reinhart - executive producer
- Simon Renshaw - management

== Charts ==
Chart (2016)	Peak position
US Independent Albums	22
