= Haley Reinhart =

American singer (born 1990)

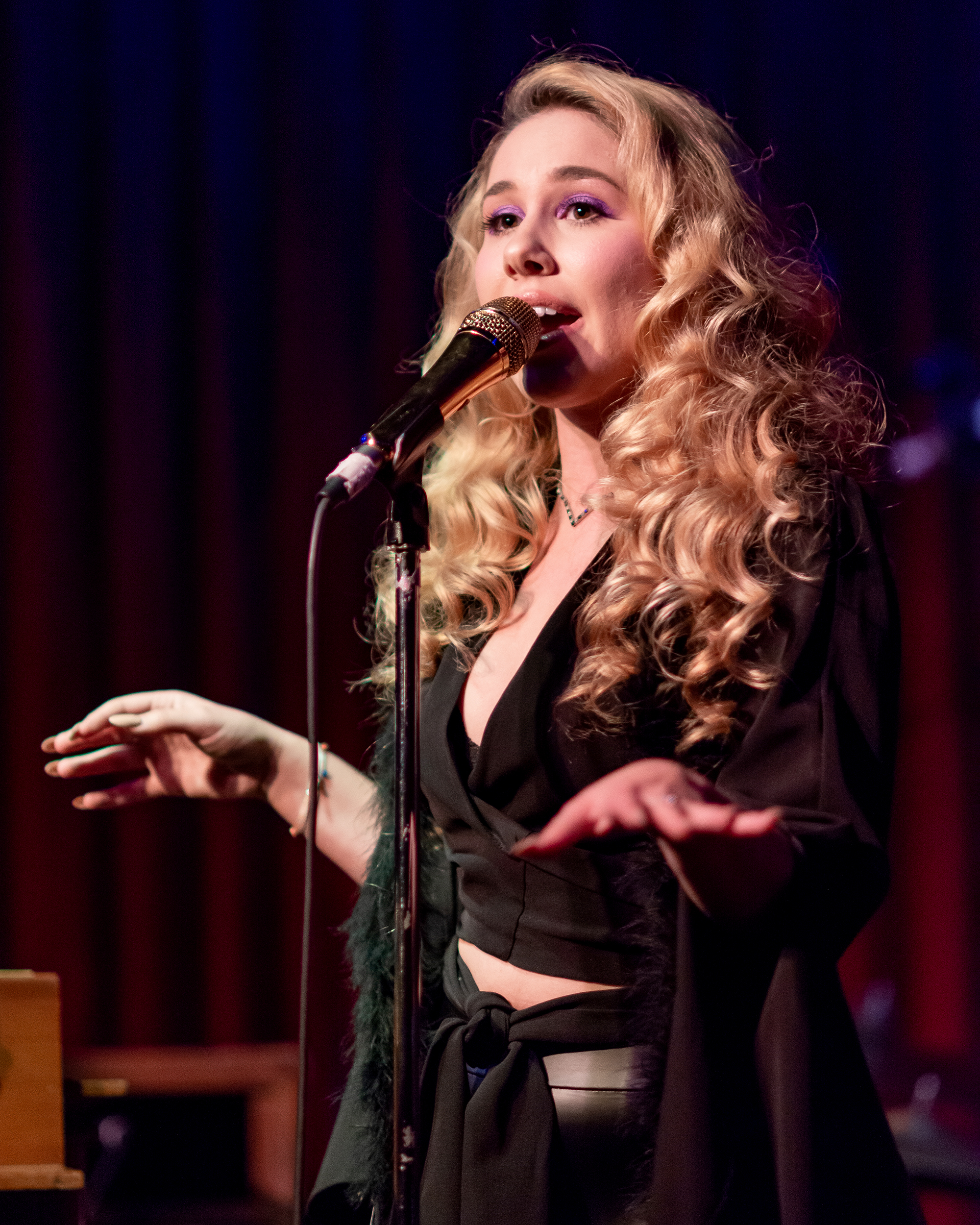
- Reinhart performing at the Hotel Café in October 2018
- Born: Haley Elizabeth Reinhart; September 9, 1990 (age 36); Wheeling, Illinois, U.S.
- Education: Harper College
- Occupations: Singer; songwriter; actress
- Years active: 2011–present
- Television: American Idol; F Is for Family
- Musical career
- Genres: Pop; jazz; rock; blues; soul; neo soul; R&B; funk
- Instrument: Vocals
- Years active: 2009–present
- Labels: Independent (2014–present); Concord (2017); 19 (2011–2014); Interscope (2011–2012)
- Website: www.haleyreinhart.com

Haley Elizabeth Reinhart (born September 9, 1990) is an American singer, songwriter, and actress from Wheeling, Illinois. She first rose to prominence after placing third in the tenth season of American Idol. In July 2011, Reinhart signed a recording deal with Interscope Records. Her debut album Listen Up! was released on May 22, 2012, to critical acclaim, and she subsequently became the first American Idol alumna to perform at Lollapalooza.

Reinhart garnered widespread recognition in 2015 for performing and touring with Scott Bradlee's Postmodern Jukebox. Her most notable collaboration with the band on a jazz cover of Radiohead's "Creep" spent 58 consecutive weeks on Billboard's Jazz Digital Songs chart and received critical acclaim. In the same year, she gained additional notice when her cover of Elvis Presley's "Can't Help Falling in Love", which was used in a commercial for Extra Gum, became a viral sensation, peaked at number 16 on the US Adult Contemporary chart, and was later certified platinum by the Recording Industry Association of America on July 31, 2023. Reinhart won a Cannes Lion for Entertainment and a Clio Award for the song in 2016.

Her second studio album, Better, served as an expansion of an initially conceived EP and was released on April 29, 2016, following the lead single and title track, "Better", which was released on April 8. The album debuted at number 22 on Billboard's Independent Albums chart. She supported the release of the album with a 2016 summer headlining tour that was held throughout the United States and a spring leg that was held throughout Europe in May and June 2017.

Reinhart's third studio album, What's That Sound?, was released September 22, 2017 through Concord Records. The album produced four singles in total, including the lead single, "Baby It's You", which was released June 16, 2017. Reinhart supported the album with a 2017 fall US headlining solo tour.

In 2018, Reinhart was a featured vocalist on Jeff Goldblum's debut album The Capitol Studios Sessions and on Vicetone's single "Something Strange", which peaked at number 23 on Billboard's Dance/Mix Show Airplay charts. On June 1, 2018, she released the standalone single "Last Kiss Goodbye", which charted at number 15 on Billboard's Jazz Digital Songs chart.

Reinhart's fourth studio album, Lo-Fi Soul, was released on March 27, 2019. The album produced four singles in total, including the lead single "Don't Know How to Love You", which was released on September 14, 2018. The album was supported with a headlining North American tour in the fall of 2019. On September 4, 2022, she released her new EP, "Off the Ground". In winter 2023, she continued her "Off the Ground Tour" throughout North America.

Reinhart made her voice acting debut in 2015 as Bill Murphy in the Netflix animated comedy F Is for Family. She reprised the role as a main cast member in the following seasons. Reinhart made her live-action acting debut in the 2020 film We Can Be Heroes.

== Early life ==
Haley Elizabeth Reinhart was born in Wheeling, Illinois, on September 9, 1990, to Patti Miller-Reinhart and Harry Reinhart, both of whom are musicians and native Chicagoans from the north side and south side, respectively. She has one sister, Angela, who is five years younger than her. Angela is a singer-songwriter and musician, as well, and she primarily performs indie folk music. Reinhart is of German, Irish, and Italian descent. Around the age of three, her parents would hold her up on stage and have her sing the chorus or vocal harmonies for "Brown Eyed Girl". She began singing seriously when she was 7 or 8 years old, performing with her parents' band, Midnight, which covers rock songs from the 1960s and 1970s. Reinhart's mother was also the lead singer for a band called The Company She Keeps before she joined Midnight in 1977. When she was nine years old, Reinhart sang LeAnn Rimes' 1996 arrangement of Bill Mack's 1958 classic, "Blue", on a big stage at a tattoo convention, and she was met with "overwhelming" support from the audience. She has been writing poetry since she was eight years old and has competed in many poetry slam competitions throughout her life. She also has a passion for improv and has been active in plays, musicals, and skit performances since childhood. Reinhart began writing songs in Middle School, and she explains that "when I give myself the time to sit down, and reflect, and feel, and let things come out, I find that it's very easy for me to do." She had several hundred compositions saved on her cell phone before it broke, losing all of the material. Reinhart had planned on auditioning for American Idol ever since middle school, where she received an award at the end of the year for student "Most Likely to Be on American Idol".

She attended Mark Twain Elementary School, O.W. Holmes Middle School, and Wheeling High School. While in high school, Reinhart was first introduced to Jazz music after becoming a part of the school's vocal group called Midnight Blues. She eventually performed at the 2009 Montreux Jazz Festival and Umbria Jazz Festival with her high school's jazz band, of which she was the first ever permanent singer. She reunited with the jazz band in 2015 when the director invited her to sing in their show at The Midwest Clinic located at McCormick Place – West, south of downtown Chicago. After graduating from high school in 2009, Reinhart attended Harper College in Palatine, Illinois from 2009 to 2010, where she studied jazz as a full-time student. She performed with the college's Jazz Ensemble and Jazz Lab. These events during her late education allowed her to gain experience singing Cole Porter standards in such historic places as Switzerland and Italy. Reinhart also fronted a band during college under such tentative names as Haley's Comet and Reinhart & the Rastatutes; the band covered classic rock songs from Led Zeppelin and other famous artists of the time. She worked as a lifeguard at the Family Aquatic Center, a waterpark at the Wheeling Park District, for three years before auditioning for American Idol.

== Idol career ==
=== 2009–2011: American Idol overview ===
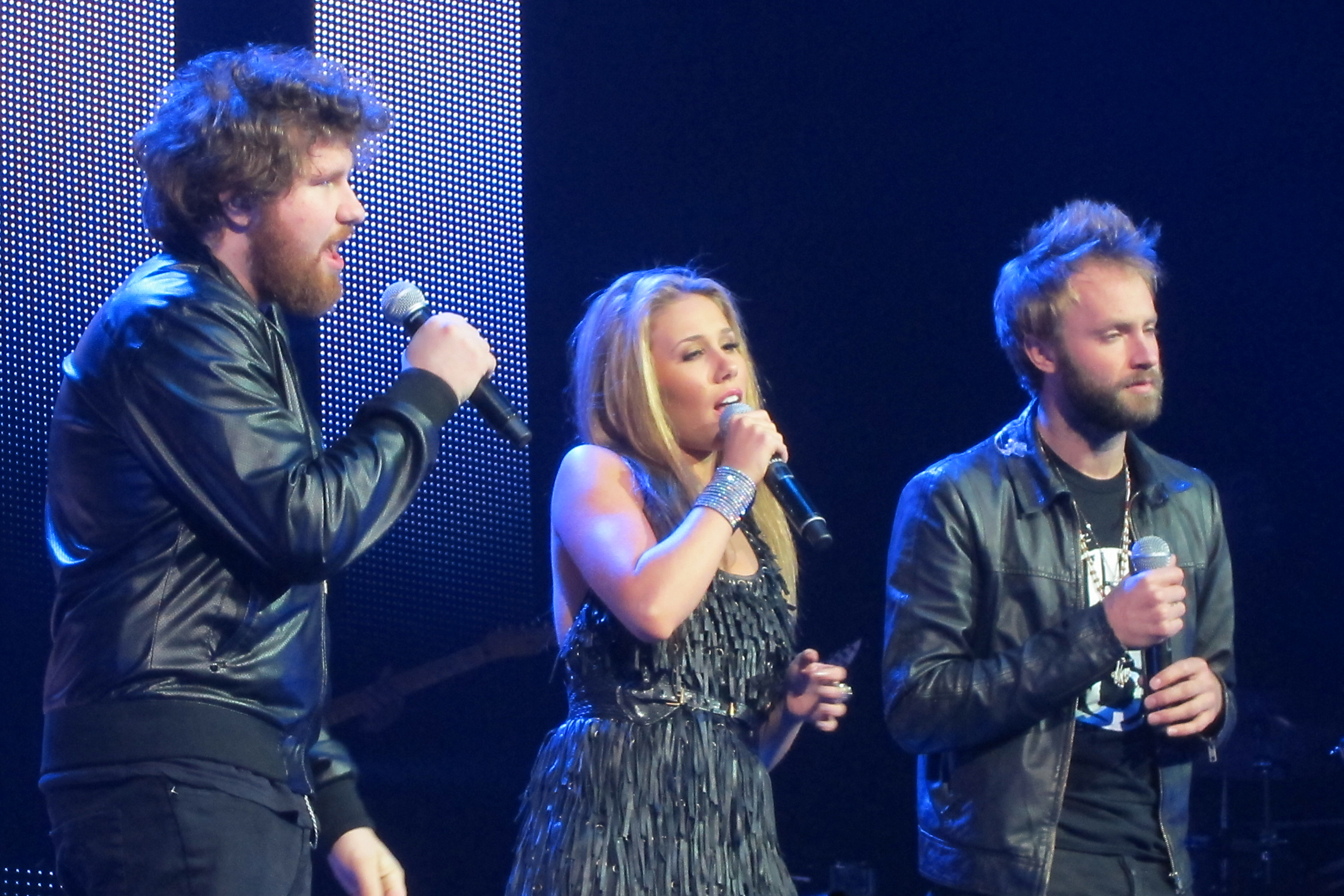
Reinhart performing with Casey Abrams and Paul McDonald on the Idols Live Tour, July 2011

Reinhart first auditioned for the ninth season of American Idol, in Chicago, but did not advance to the Hollywood round. However, she returned the following year for the tenth season of Idol in Milwaukee, Wisconsin, and advanced after singing The Beatles' "Oh! Darling". Although she auditioned with two songs, the first being Alicia Keys's "Fallin'", only her second song choice of "Oh! Darling" was aired on television.

She successfully progressed through the first Hollywood solo round after singing "Breathless" by Corinne Bailey Rae. In the group round of Hollywood week, her group mates included fellow finalist Paul McDonald, and she advanced even after forgetting some of the lyrics to "Carry On Wayward Son". Later in the second solo round, she performed "God Bless the Child", impressing the judges and making a comeback from her weaker group performance. In the Vegas Round, she grouped up with fellow finalists Naima Adedapo and Jacob Lusk to perform The Beatles's "The Long and Winding Road", which earned all three contestants a spot among the final 48 competitors. Reinhart was selected by the judges as a semi-finalist after her final Hollywood solo performance, and she was later voted into the Top 12 finalists after singing "Fallin'" by Alicia Keys during the live semi-final show. Though she was among the bottom three singers on four occasions during the finals, she advanced through to the penultimate week of the competition after giving memorable performances of "House of the Rising Sun" and "I (Who Have Nothing)" during Top 5-week and Top 4-week, respectively. She was eliminated in third place behind Scotty McCreery and Lauren Alaina, who progressed to the finale. She sang "Bennie and the Jets" for her farewell encore performance. Though the judges often harshly criticized her for song choices and stage presence, she was considered a fan-favorite and a dark horse in the competition.

She is the only season 10 contestant who has over one million views on six of her YouTube performance videos: her renditions of Adele's "Rolling in the Deep", Elton John's "Bennie and the Jets", Ben E. King's "I (Who Have Nothing)", and her version of "House of the Rising Sun". Her performance of "God Bless the Child" hit 1,000,000 views in March 2014. The video of her audition performance of "Oh! Darling" reached 1,000,000 views in March 2016. Reinhart was also the only contestant in season 10 who received three standing ovations from the judges in consecutive weeks: "The House of the Rising Sun", "I (Who Have Nothing)", and Led Zeppelin's "What Is and What Should Never Be". Her performance of "Moanin'" with fellow contestant Casey Abrams during the Top 8 results show also received a standing ovation from the judges and was considered one of the best duets and performances of the season. During the American Idol Finale, Reinhart sang "Steppin' Out with My Baby" alongside jazz singer Tony Bennett, which also received a standing ovation.

In preparation for the January 6, 2016 premiere of American Idol's Farewell Season, E! Online ranked Reinhart's cover of "Bennie and the Jets" as the series' 14th best performance, TVLine ranked the performance as the 6th best in Idol history, and BuzzFeed ranked it 1st on their list of the "17 Most Iconic American Idol Performances of All Time." Reinhart's performance of "The House of the Rising Sun" was included at number 9 on LA Times's list of the "10 Most Memorable Idol Performances of All-Time." In addition, Reinhart appeared twice on Billboard's list of "American Idol's Top 100 Live Performances." She was listed at number 68 for her interpretation of "Bennie and the Jets" and peaked on the list at number 18 for her cover of "The House of the Rising Sun". Additionally, Reinhart was ranked 26 out of 168 on Vulture.com's comprehensive list ranking all of the American Idol finalists from worst to best based on over-all performance within the scope of their respective seasons. She was praised for her "wildly uneven" performances and her fearlessness in confronting the judges about their critiques, factors the publication felt contributed to her being "one of the more convincing rocker-chicks to grace the Idol stage." In 2019, Screen Rant ranked Reinhart as the 6th best Idol singer to never win.

==== Musician and celebrity support ====
She received notable musician and celebrity support from Robert Plant, Lady Gaga, Jimmy Page, Kelly Clarkson, Adam Lambert, Tom Hanks, Blake Lewis, Melinda Doolittle, Kris Allen, Ellen DeGeneres, and others, who picked Reinhart as their favorite Season 10 contestant. Gaga cleared Reinhart's performance of "You and I" during Top 5-week, while Plant and Page contacted Idol producers and offered Reinhart the opportunity to sing a Led Zeppelin song for Top 3-week.

==== Performances/results ====
| Episode | Theme | Song choice | Original artist | Order # | Result |
|---|---|---|---|---|---|
| Audition | Auditioner's Choice | "Fallin'" (unaired) | Alicia Keys | N/A | Advanced |
| Audition | Auditioner's Choice | "Oh! Darling" | The Beatles | N/A | Advanced |
| Hollywood Round,1 | First Solo | "Breathless" | Corinne Bailey Rae | N/A | Advanced |
| Hollywood Round, Part 2 | Group Performance | "Carry On Wayward Son" with Paul McDonald and others | Kansas | N/A | Advanced |
| Hollywood Round, Part 3 | Second Solo | "God Bless the Child" | Billie Holiday | N/A | Advanced |
| Las Vegas Round | Songs of The Beatles; Group Performance | "The Long and Winding Road" with Naima Adedapo and Jacob Lusk | The Beatles | N/A | Advanced |
| Hollywood Round Final | Final Solo | "Baby It's You" | The Shirelles | N/A | Advanced |
| Top 24 (12 Women) | Personal Choice | "Fallin'" | Alicia Keys | 9 | Advanced |
| Top 13 | Your Personal Idol | "Blue" | LeAnn Rimes | 7 | Bottom 3 (Note: When Ryan Seacrest announced the results for this particular night, Reinhart was among the Bottom 3 but declared safe second, as Ashthon Jones was eliminated.) |
| Top 12 | Year You Were Born | "I'm Your Baby Tonight" | Whitney Houston | 5 | Bottom 3 (Note: When Ryan Seacrest announced the results for this particular night, Reinhart was among the Bottom 3 but declared safe second, as Karen Rodriguez was eliminated.) |
| Top 11 | Motown | "You've Really Got a Hold on Me" | The Miracles | 6 | Safe |
| Top 11 (Note: Due to the judges using their one save on Casey Abrams, the Top 11 remained intact for another week, when two contestants were eliminated.) | Elton John | "Bennie and the Jets" | Elton John | 11 | Safe |
| Top 9 | Rock & Roll Hall of Fame | "Piece of My Heart" | Erma Franklin | 2 | Safe |
| Top 8 | Songs from the Movies | "Call Me" | Blondie | 6 | Bottom 3 (Note: Reinhart was saved first from elimination.) |
| Top 7 | Songs from the 21st Century | "Rolling in the Deep" | Adele | 3 | Bottom 3 (Note: Reinhart was saved first from elimination.) |
| Top 6 | Carole King | Duet "I Feel the Earth Move" with Casey Abrams | Carole King | 3 | Safe |
| Top 6 | Carole King | Solo "Beautiful" | Carole King | 8 | Safe |
| Top 5 | Songs from Now and Then | "You and I" | Lady Gaga | 5 | Safe |
| Top 5 | Songs from Now and Then | "The House of the Rising Sun" | Traditional | 10 | Safe |
| Top 4 | Songs That Inspire | "Earth Song" | Michael Jackson | 2 | Safe |
| Top 4 | Leiber & Stoller Songbook | "I (Who Have Nothing)" | Ben E. King | 5 | Safe |
| Top 3 | Contestant's Choice | "What Is and What Should Never Be" | Led Zeppelin | 3 | Eliminated |
| Top 3 | Jimmy Iovine's Choice | "Rhiannon" | Fleetwood Mac | 6 | Eliminated |
| Top 3 | Judges' Choice | "You Oughta Know" | Alanis Morissette | 9 | Eliminated |

== Post Idol career ==
=== 2011–2013: Listen Up! and other projects ===
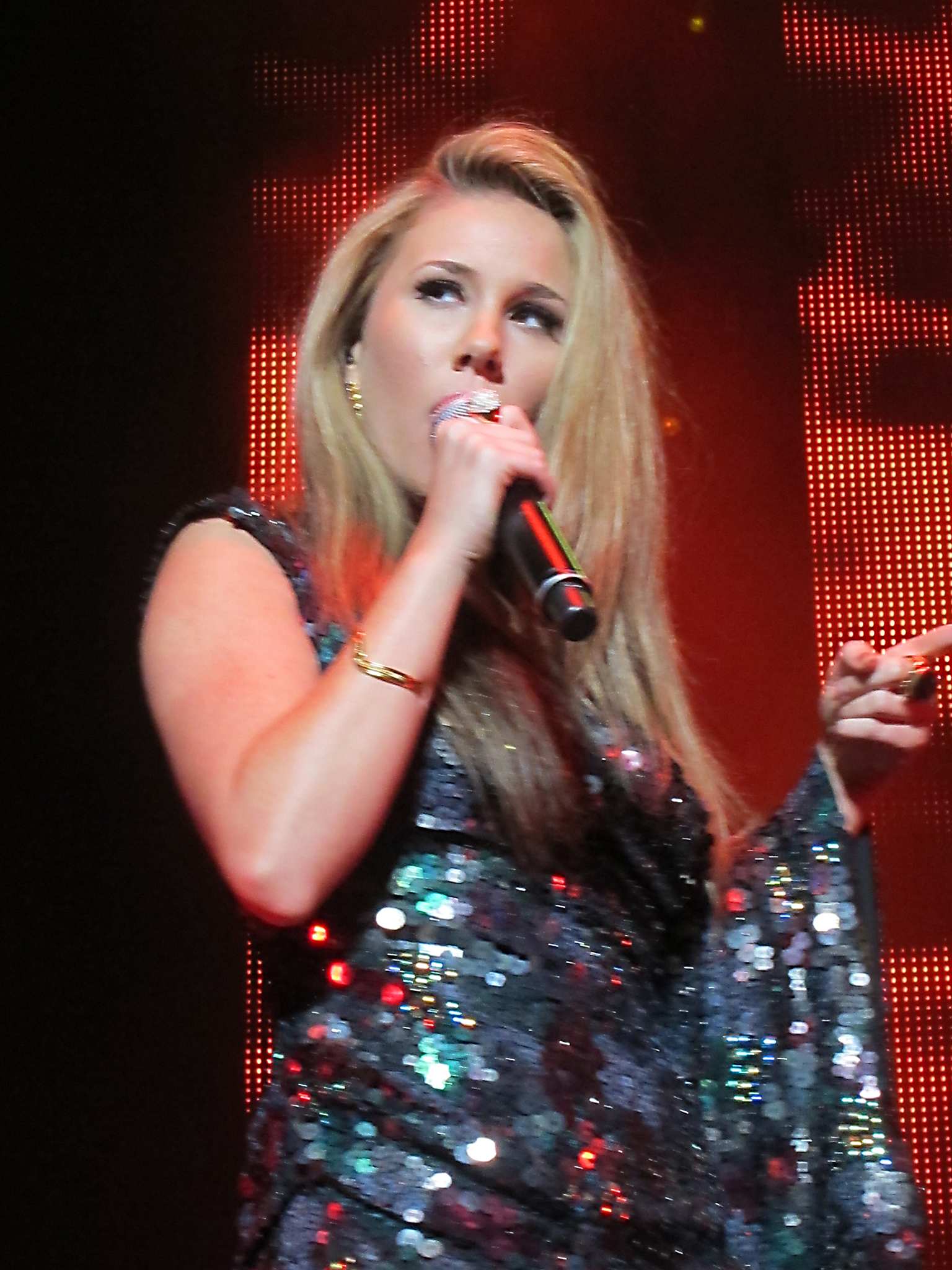
Reinhart in July 2011

After her elimination, Reinhart had reportedly signed to Interscope Records, as per the implication of AI executive producer and director Nigel Lythgoe's tweet, which read: "Jimmy played me a song for Haley's record yesterday. Let's hope all the people that are professing love buy it and give her a great start." On May 28, 2011, Reinhart and the other American Idol top 4 performed at the opening of the new Microsoft Store at Lenox Square Mall in Atlanta, Georgia. On June 2, 2011, Reinhart was interviewed on Live with Regis and Kelly. She performed "House of The Rising Sun" on the show. On June 17, 2011, TVLine released an interview between Reinhart and Michael Slezak. They discussed her life before Idol, her "cannon fodder" edit on the show, her unfair treatment by the judges, her unique song choices that became known as "some of the best on Idol ever", and her future. Slezak crowned her TVLine's favorite Season 10 contestant and thanked her for "kicking ass" and being "a risk-taker and awesome". In less than a week, it garnered more responses than any other article on the site. Reinhart, along with the rest of the Top 11, toured the country as a part of the American Idols LIVE! Tour 2011, which ended on September 10, 2011. Reinhart, along with fellow contestants Scotty McCreery, Lauren Alaina, and James Durbin, released a Walmart Exclusive EP with her highlights from season 10 on American Idol. The tracks feature some of her popular performances such as "House of the Rising Sun" and "Bennie and the Jets" as well as a previously unreleased recording of "You Oughta Know". Reinhart's EP debuted at number 37 on the Billboard 200 with sales of 14,000.

On July 26, 2011, it was confirmed that Reinhart signed to 19/Interscope Records. On August 16, 2011, Reinhart was an artist featured in the Huffington Post's article, "15 New, Young Artists on the Rise". Reinhart spent 2011 and early 2012 working on her debut album, which she described as R&B/soul music with jazzy influences. For her debut album Listen Up!, Reinhart stated that she wanted to have an "organic" feel to it, stating, "I want it to be real and I want it to have substance. Depth on different levels is so important to me...I want people to be able to run away with my melodies and get lost in them and take the lyrics and be able to relate to them." She wrote or co-wrote the majority of the tracks on the album. Later, Reinhart and Casey Abrams recorded a holiday song, a cover of "Baby, It's Cold Outside", which was released on November 21, 2011. The official video was released on November 15, 2011. The Idol duo performed "Baby, It's Cold Outside" and The Beatles's "All My Loving" in The Magnificent Mile Lights Festival and on Windy City Live in Chicago. Additionally, she performed an acoustic version of "Wild Horses" with Slash and Myles Kennedy on February 18, 2012, at the Power of Love Gala for Muhammad Ali.

The first single of her debut album, "Free", was produced by Busbee and released on March 20, 2012. To promote the single, she performed "Free" and two other songs from her album, "Wasted Tears" and "Hit the Ground Running" at various venues. The promotional events included a release concert at the Hard Rock Cafe in Hollywood and a TV guest spot on the "Blue Ivy" episode of 90210. She also performed the single at the National Cherry Blossom Festival Parade in May 2012. The single reached number 104 on the Billboard Hot 100 and number 26 on the Adult Top 40. "Free" achieved some success in the Philippines, as well. Reinhart's debut album Listen Up! was released on May 22, 2012 and debuted at number 17 on the Billboard 200, with 20,000 copies sold. Listen Up! was highly praised by critics for its retro sound and neo-soul, funk, and jazz influences. As of 2016, Listen Up! has sold 77,000 copies. "Free" was used as the goodbye anthem for the ninth season of So You Think You Can Dance, while "Undone" was featured in Step Up Revolution and sung by Rachel Hale in the Hollywood Rounds on the twelfth season of American Idol. In June 2012, Reinhart participated in the Taco Bell All-Star Legends and Celebrity Softball Game, which aired after the 2012 Major League Baseball Home Run Derby. During the same month, she was also featured on a duet of "Hit the Road Jack" on Casey Abrams' self-titled debut album. On August 3, 2012, Reinhart performed songs from her debut album backed by her family on instrumentation and backup vocals at the 2012 Lollapalooza festival, becoming the first American Idol contestant to achieve the feat. In October 2012, she performed several jazz songs at Carnegie Hall with Irvin Mayfield. At the end of 2012, Reinhart was dropped from Interscope Records, supposedly due to poor album sales and chart performance; however, the official reason remains undisclosed.

In January 2013, Reinhart was the Critics' Choice performer on the second episode of the NBC series Real Music Live. She performed "Oh My!" and then later joined the announcers for an interview in which she detailed how her life had changed since her run on Idol. Later in 2013, Reinhart traveled to Japan, Singapore, Malaysia, and Indonesia and held a mini promotional concert for the twelfth season of American Idol. In Jakarta, Reinhart was a musical guest on the X Factor Indonesia singing "Bennie and the Jets". During the same year, Reinhart also attended an Ole song writing camp to write for Roc Nation artists at Westlake Studios. One of the songs she wrote, "Love Not War", was leaked online in May 2014. A song Reinhart originally co-wrote for Listen Up!, "Get Yourself Together", was recorded by The Voice finalist Christina Grimmie for her 2013 album, With Love.

=== 2014–2015: EP promotion, Postmodern Jukebox, viral recognition, and F Is for Family ===
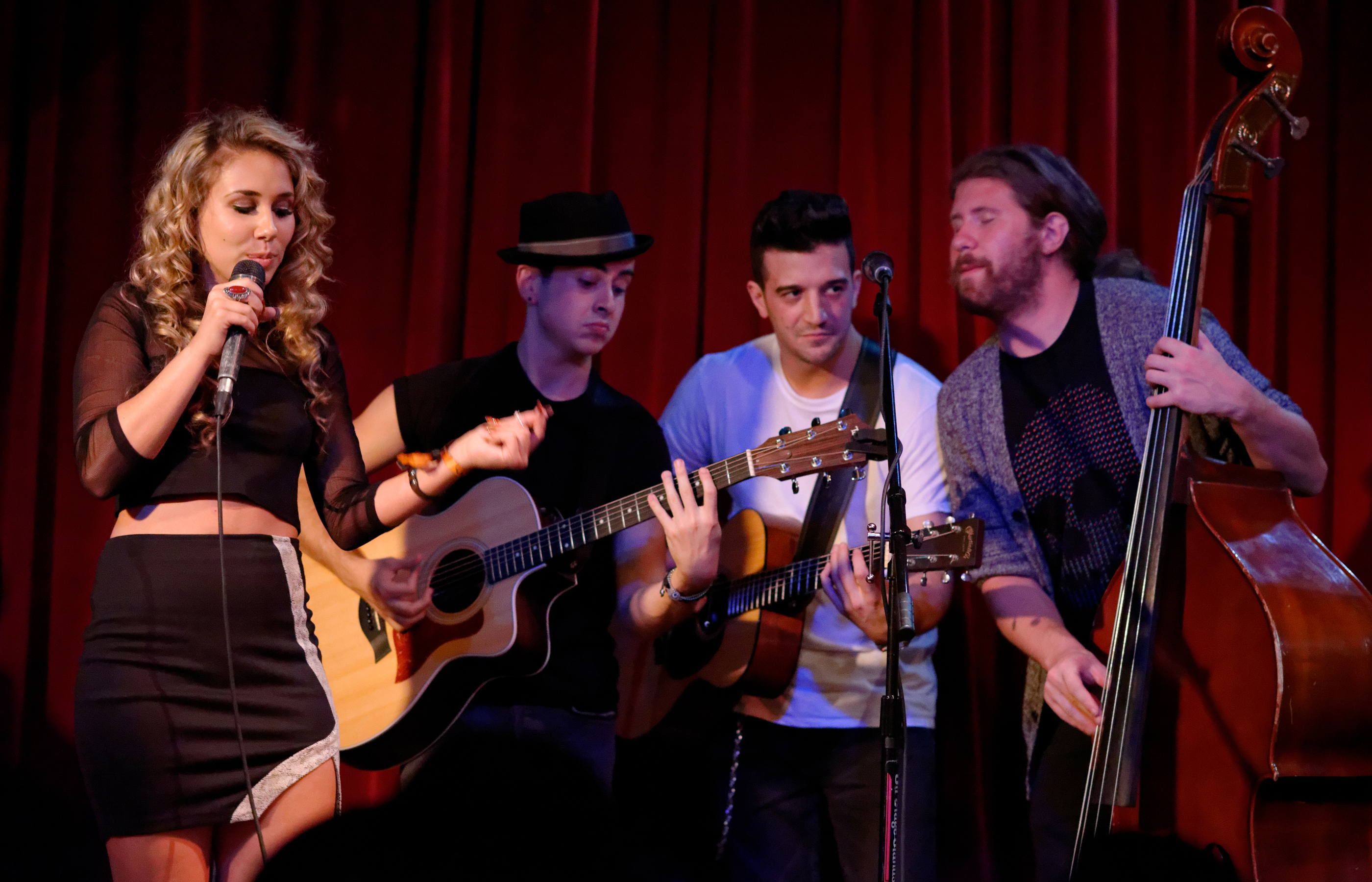
Reinhart performing with Casey Abrams, Mark Ballas, and Dylan Chambers at Room 5 Lounge in Los Angeles, 2014

Reinhart announced that work had begun on an EP in 2013. Reinhart began an Indiegogo campaign in February 2014 to fund a music video for her new single, "Show Me Your Moves". In April, her song "Listen", later included in her second studio album, was used for a Showtime miniseries called Years of Living Dangerously. The Indiegogo campaign to fund the release of her music video became fully funded during the same month. The video was filmed in the Mojave Desert in May 2014 over the span of 18 hours with the help of a 40-person production team. The single and video were released on July 30, 2014. The music video was written and directed by choreographer Danni Gutierrez, and produced and filmed by Avi Cohen from White Revolver Productions. Throughout 2014, Reinhart performed several small-scale gigs in support for her EP, debuting several original songs in her performances at Room 5 Lounge in Los Angeles. She was joined on several occasions by Casey Abrams, as well as well-known songwriters Dylan Chambers and BC Jean, who provided back-up instrumentation and vocals during her performances. In October 2014, Reinhart signed a deal with independent management company Ole, where they gained worldwide co-publishing rights to her existing and future work and also agreed to provide financial support for the recording of an EP. On November 13, 2014, Reinhart performed with Irvin Mayfield and the New Orleans Jazz Orchestra at the House of Blues in New Orleans, where she provided vocals for jazz versions of classic rock songs from Led Zeppelin, Nirvana and Queen.

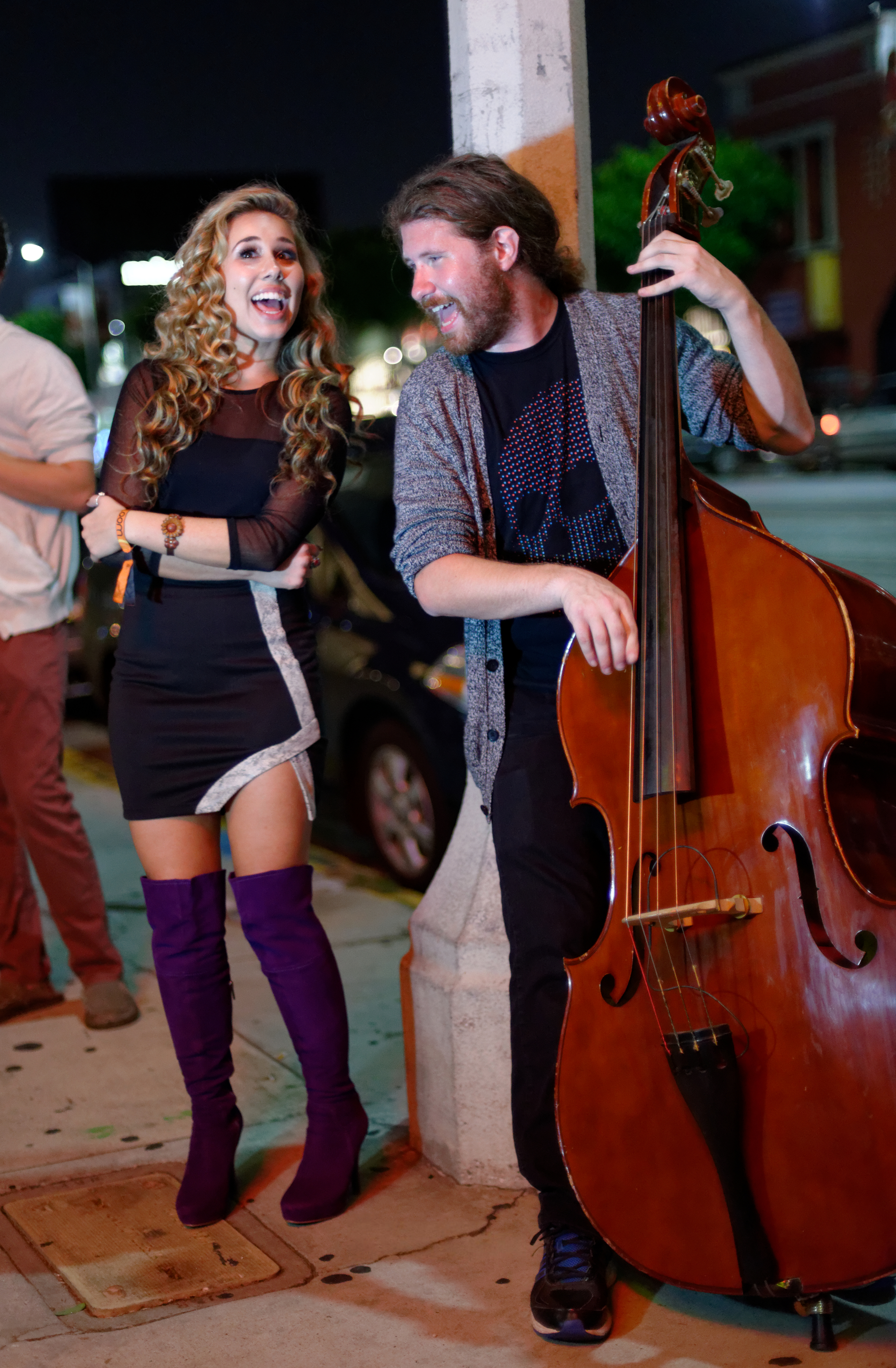
Reinhart and Casey Abrams performing, June 2014

In January 2015, Reinhart performed a comedy routine in Los Angeles at IO West Comedy Club for Mo Collins's improv show "Mo and Tell". She recalled a horrifying airplane experience as she attempted to leave Los Angeles and fly back to Chicago to visit her family for Christmas the December prior. She also served as the opening musical act for Bill Burr's comedy show at Largo in Los Angeles during the same year. Reinhart collaborated with Casey Abrams again in 2015 for his music video, "Great Bright Morning", as well as for the songs "Cougartown" and "Never Knew What Love Can Do", which were featured on Abram's EP, Tales from the Gingerbread House, that was released on January 29, 2016.

Throughout 2015, Reinhart collaborated with Postmodern Jukebox, which produces vintage-styled covers of recent pop songs. Her initial video with the band was a cover video of Tove Lo's "Habits". Two months later, a cover of Meghan Trainor's "All About That Bass" was released, in which Reinhart sang alongside fellow vocalists Morgan James and Ariana Savalas. In April, Reinhart and Postmodern Jukebox released a cover of Radiohead's "Creep", which obtained critical acclaim and stayed at the number one position on the Billboard Digital Jazz Songs chart for several weeks. It spent 58 consecutive weeks on Billboard's Jazz digital charts. The cover was also included in People's list of "The 9 Best Viral Cover Videos of 2015". As of November 2021, this cover has over 100,000,000 views and is the most-watched video on the channel. In May 2015, Postmodern Jukebox released Reinhart's fourth cover with the band, "Lovefool", which received critical acclaim. In July, Reinhart was featured in her fifth collaboration with Scott Bradlee, a Marilyn Monroe-style cover of Britney Spears's hit song "Oops!... I Did It Again". Her sixth collaboration came in August with a New Orleans-style cover of The White Stripes's iconic song "Seven Nation Army". Reinhart's final collaboration within this PMJ sequence was a duet with Puddles Pity Party performing the Tears for Fears classic "Mad World". Reinhart toured with the group throughout North America, Europe, and Australia for several months, starting in the summer of 2015.

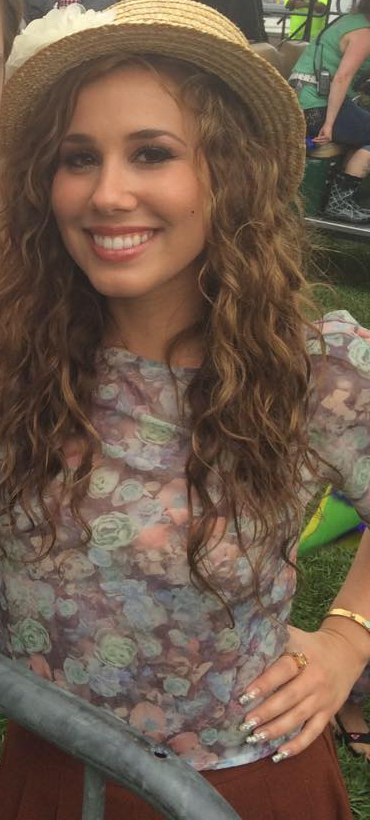
Haley Reinhart on April 10, 2015

Before going on tour, Reinhart recorded the tracks for a six-song EP, Better, at Westlake Recording Studios, which was subsequently delayed and expanded into an LP. On June 17, 2015, Reinhart partnered with Dave Damiani's No Vacancy Orchestra to kick off the "Jazz Wednesdays" Concert Series in Laguna Beach, California. She performed traditional jazz pieces such as Etta James's "At Last", as well as jazzy interpretations of modern classics like Amy Winehouse's "You Know I'm No Good". On July 4, Reinhart performed her cover of "Creep" on the Josh Wolf Show with Postmodern Jukebox. Later in July, she opened for The Rigs at The Troubadour in West Hollywood, California, performing covers as well as original material from Better. In early August, Reinhart and Abrams performed as the main stage act at the "Jazz in the Pines" festival in Idyllwild, California. They collaborated on cover songs as well as on original compositions from each singer's respective discography. On November 30, 2015, Reinhart joined Josh Wolf, this time as a guest on the ninth episode of his Fairly Normal Podcast, where she discussed her life and her current projects.

In late 2015, Reinhart gained widespread recognition when her cover of "Can't Help Falling in Love" was used in an Extra Gum commercial, "The Story of Sarah & Juan", the advertisement first began circulating on Facebook before a full version of the song was released separately through YouTube. In total, the single has sold 200,000 units and has been streamed more than 200,000,000 times on Spotify, reaching the number one spot on the streaming service's Global Viral chart. Meanwhile, as of January 2017, the video has amassed 20,000,000 views on YouTube and 92,000,000 views on Facebook. The song was certified Platinum on July 31, 2023, by the Recording Industry Association of America, indicating 1,000,000 units sold. Additionally, the video was a candidate in the YouTube Ads of the Year contest for 2015, and it won for the category "TheYoutubeAd That Gives You Feels". Reinhart was credited with "bringing the classic back to the Adult Contemporary Chart" when the single debuted at number 25 on the Billboard AC chart dated January 16, 2016.

With this debut, her cover became the seventh version of the song to chart on the AC since Elvis Presley's original release in 1962 and the first version to chart since UB40's reggae interpretation in 1993. Of the cover, Reinhart expressed: "I wanted to make it sound as if I was talking to or whispering to a loved one next to me, that kind of vibe." For the song, Reinhart was recognized with a 2016 Women in Sync Award for "Best Artist-Sync Tie-In". The Women in Sync Awards is an annual event organized by SyncSummit to recognize the "excellence of the work done by women in the fields of music, visual media, interactive media, advertising and brands." Reinhart also won a Silver Lion alongside Wrigley Company at the 2016 Cannes Lions International Festival of Creativity in the entertainment category of "Cross Channel Brand Experience" for the placement of her song in the commercial. On September 28, 2016, Reinhart's cover won gold at the Clio Awards for "Best Use of Music" in the "Short Form Film" category.

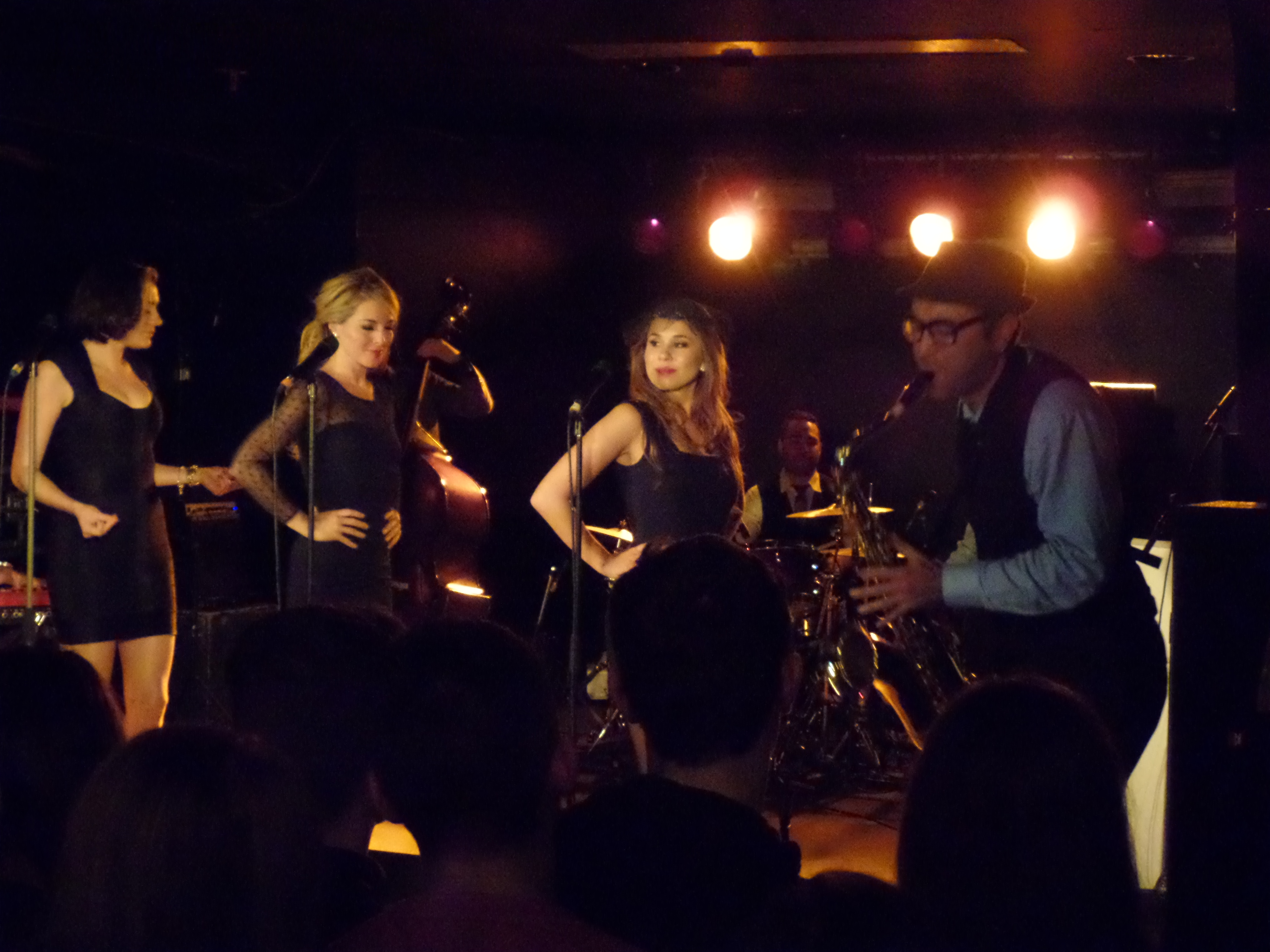
Haley Reinhart performing at a Live Concert in Cologne with Postmodern Jukebox, March 2015

Reinhart continued to expand her catalog and her notability in the concluding months of the year. On October 26, 2015, Reinhart paid tribute to Billie Holiday at Philadelphia Music Alliance's Walk of Fame Gala by singing her rendition of "God Bless the Child" alongside The Roots and Erykah Badu. Dionne Warwick presented Holliday with a posthumous award prior to Reinhart's performance. Jimmy Fallon hosted the sold-out event, which honored The Roots and several other local music legends who were inductees into the 2015 Walk of Fame.

Reinhart recorded a Christmas song, "Santa, I Just Want You," for the opening credits of the Hallmark Channel original movie Crown for Christmas, which aired on November 27, 2015. The song was written by the film's director, Alex Zamm, and his writing partner Alex Geringas. It also appeared on the duo's Christmas EP, Holiday-o-Rama, Vol. 1 (Christmas Collection). Finally, Reinhart made her voice acting debut in the first season of the Netflix animated comedy-drama television series F Is for Family, in which she starred as a young boy named Bill Murphy, a fictional depiction of Bill Burr as a child. The series premiered on December 18, 2015, to a generally positive critical reception. Specifically, Reinhart's character has been praised for providing a true focal point for the series and for the humor conveyed during his frequent inappropriate and awkward experiences. Matt Fowler of IGN opined that Reinhart's Bill Murphy provides the series' best laughs. Reinhart also contributed a cover of "O Holy Night" for the sixth episode of the series, "O Holy Moly Night".

=== 2016: Better, Better Tour, and other projects ===
In January 2016, Reinhart was featured alongside fellow season ten Idol alum Jacob Lusk and season 14 alum Adanna Duru in the "Orchestra of People" video for Casey Abrams's song "Never Knew What Love Can Do". It was announced on February 5, 2016, that Reinhart would be returning to American Idol for its Farewell Season. She was featured on the February 18 episode mentoring as well as singing duets with two contestants from the season's Top 24 semi-finalists. In an interview with Juliette Miranda of The Unwritable Rant podcast, Reinhart expressed the possibility of a radio promotion tour for "Can't Help Falling in Love" to open up the song to a wider audience, due to its viral success and its positive performance on the AC charts. In mid-February 2016, radio promotion concert events were announced, with several 2016 dates released for preliminary venues located throughout the United States. Reinhart performed at The Hard Rock Cafe in Denver on February 17 for Mix 100. She performed at Mix 96.9's Broken Hearts Ball concert event in Scottsdale, Arizona on February 19 and at the Acoustic Cafe for 96.5 Tic FM in Hartford, Connecticut on March 14. In March 2016, Reinhart signed a deal with talent agency ICM Partners, maintaining her previous contract with Ole, as well.

Reinhart was a featured performer for Pet-A-Palooza at Sunset Park in Paradise, Nevada on April 9, 2016. The event was sponsored by Mix 94.1 radio station out of Henderson, Nevada. On April 13, she sang the National Anthem at the Los Angeles Dodgers game. Additionally, on April 11, she officially confirmed the second season of F is for Family and announced that she would be reprising her role as Bill Murphy. A song co-written by Reinhart, "All You Gotta Do", as well as its Spanish-language equivalent, "Sólo dime tu", was recorded by Argentine singer Martina Stoessel for her debut solo album, Tini, released April 29, 2016. Reinhart performed with Dave Damiani and the No Vacancy Orchestra at Dante Theater in Atlantic City, New Jersey on July 22 and 23 as part of a tribute to Amy Winehouse and other female soul singers. She returned for her second year as a headlining performer with Casey Abrams at the Jazz in the Pines Festival in Idyllwild, California. The two performed on August 21, 2016. On September 3, 2016, Reinhart headlined the Buffalo Grove Days Festival in Buffalo Grove, Illinois, alongside her parents' band, Midnight. A song co-written by Reinhart, "Let Yourself Be Beautiful," was recorded by Dutch singer Jennie Lena for her EP, Acoustic Sessions, released December 2, 2016.

In early 2016, Reinhart confirmed that she would be collaborating with Postmodern Jukebox again; she joined them for several London dates on their 2016 tour. Additionally, she professed her wishes of working with the band on new material. Subsequently, on June 16, 2016, Reinhart's eighth collaboration with the musical collective was released, a cover of Soundgarden's 1994 single "Black Hole Sun". Bloody Disgusting highlighted the release of the video and noted that "there is a wonderful mystery in this version that nods to the original while making it 100% its own."

Better album and tour

Although initially conveyed as an EP, Reinhart expanded Better into a full-length LP, which served as her second studio album. The album was released on April 29, 2016. It includes some tracks that were written as demos several years ago, as well as some newer tracks, including her cover of "Can't Help Falling in Love". She described Better as a "sultry" mix of funk and rock with a soulful foundation that is crafted to inspire self-confidence and independence in young women, especially through the title track and lead single, "Better". She had already filmed a video for "Better" but delayed its release due to conflicting projects and being presented with several offers from record labels. She did not sign with a label to release the album independently and "make sure things were right." However, she professed the possibility of signing with a label in the future. The lead single "Better" was released on April 8, and its associated music video, directed by Casey Curry, premiered through Billboard on April 27. Better debuted at number 22 on Billboard's Independent Albums chart dated May 21, 2016 and sold 7,500 units in its first two weeks of release.

In a January interview with Michigan Avenue Magazine, Reinhart expressed her intentions of launching a 2016 summer tour to promote the release of Better. In an interview with Popdust in March 2016, she elaborated further, expressing plans to launch her summer tour in May or June, with proposed US dates in Seattle and Florida as well as international shows in the UK, where she believed her music would resonate especially well. On March 28, 2016, Reinhart officially confirmed her first US summer solo tour, which consisted of 17 dates throughout the month of June. Her pianist, Jacob Luttrell, served as the tour's opening act. On May 25, 2016, Reinhart announced a European leg for her headlining tour, which consisted of an additional 16 dates throughout September and October. On September 9, 2016, it was announced that the European leg of Reinhart's Better Tour would be postponed until spring of 2017, with some dates rescheduled for May and June and many others cancelled due to rescheduling conflicts.

Reinhart confirmed in September 2016 that she would be in the studio recording new music before her European Tour in May 2017.

=== 2017: What's That Sound?, Tour ===
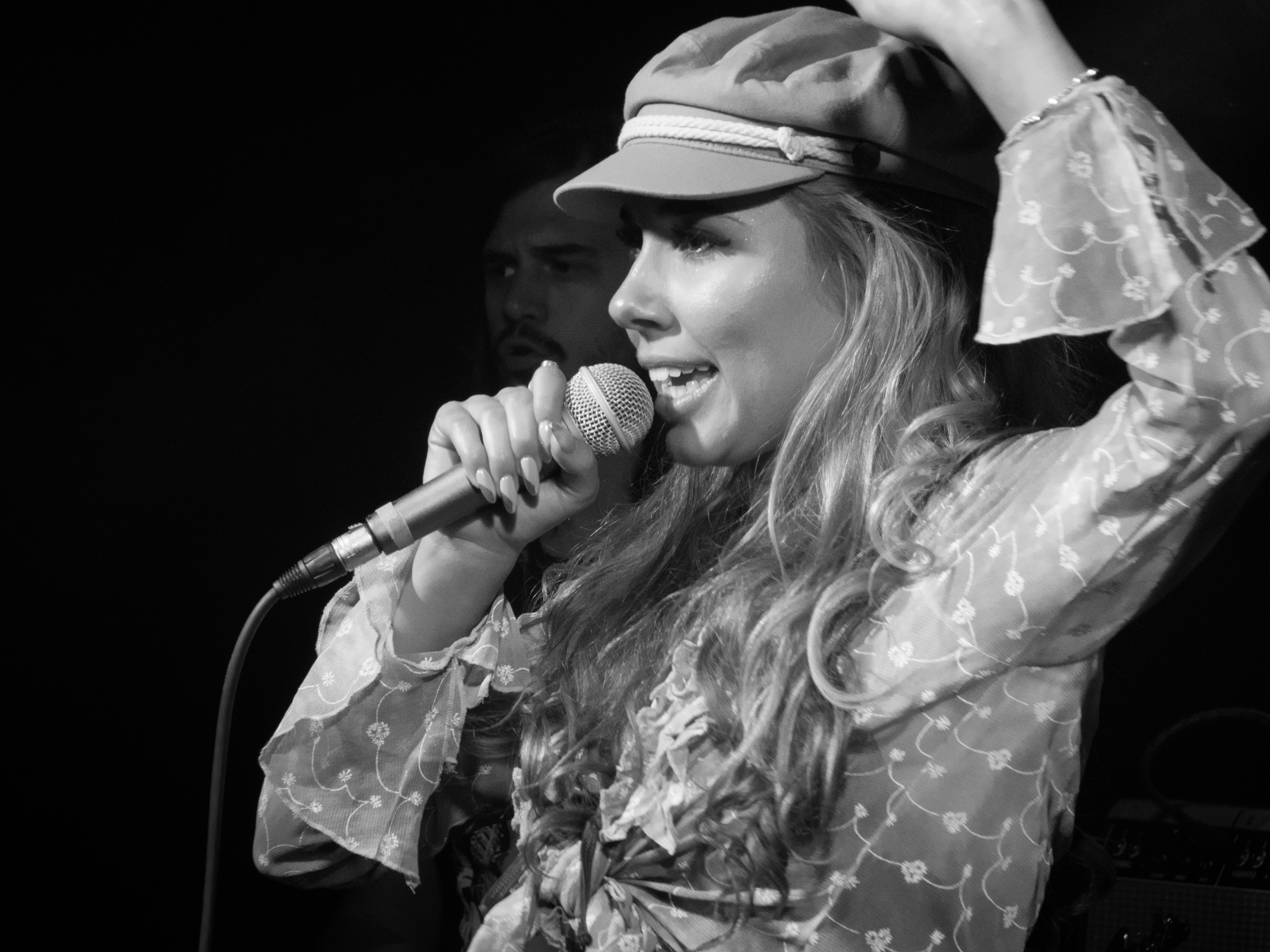
Reinhart performing at Musik & Frieden in Berlin on May 25, 2017

On January 4, 2017, Reinhart announced via social media that production had begun on her third studio album. The album was produced by Reinhart and John Burk, President of Concord Records. Mike Merritt and Mike Shapiro provided backing instrumentation for the album alongside Postmodern Jukebox's Scott Bradlee, who played piano, and Reinhart's father, Harry, who once again provided guitar. The album, What's That Sound?, was released September 22, 2017 through Concord Records and features 11 covers of 1960s classics with 3 original songs. Reinhart described the project as an homage to songs and bands that influenced her childhood and her career. The album's lead single, "Baby It's You" was released June 16, 2017 alongside the official music video. The album's first promotional single, "The Letter", was released in a special video preview on July 13, 2017. The album's second single "For What It's Worth" was released through an exclusive lyric video premiere on August 10, 2017, preceding a wide release on August 11, 2017. "Let's Start", one of three original tracks on the album, was released on September 15, 2017, simultaneously with the song's music video. The album debuted at 67 on Billboard's Top Album Sales chart, for the week dated October 14, 2017. In support of the album, Reinhart embarked on an 18-show fall tour throughout the US, commencing October 22, 2017 and concluding November 18.

Also in 2017, Reinhart reprised her voice role as Bill Murphy in the second season of F is for Family, which was released May 30, 2017 and contains ten episodes. She was upped to a series regular for the second season. Following the success of Reinhart's Extra Gum commercial, she partnered with Walmart for their "Good Times" commercial in late 2017, for which she provided a cover of "(I've Had) The Time of My Life". Reinhart was a featured collaborator on Irvin Mayfield and Kermit Ruffins's album A Beautiful World, released October 13, 2017. She sings on the track "Don't Worry, Be Happy" alongside Jason Marsalis, Cyril Neville, and Glen David Andrews, and is the main vocalist on the title track "Beautiful World [for Imani]". She also provides uncredited vocals on the song "Mystic" and backing vocals throughout the album.

Reinhart expressed interest in taking acting and improv classes after the conclusion of her fall 2017 tour, indicating her desire to try new things and expand beyond her voice role in F is for Family. She also expressed her desire to put out a 1970s-inspired record, a jazz record, or to continue to release original material.

=== 2018–2019: Lo-Fi Soul, collaborations, and EP releases ===
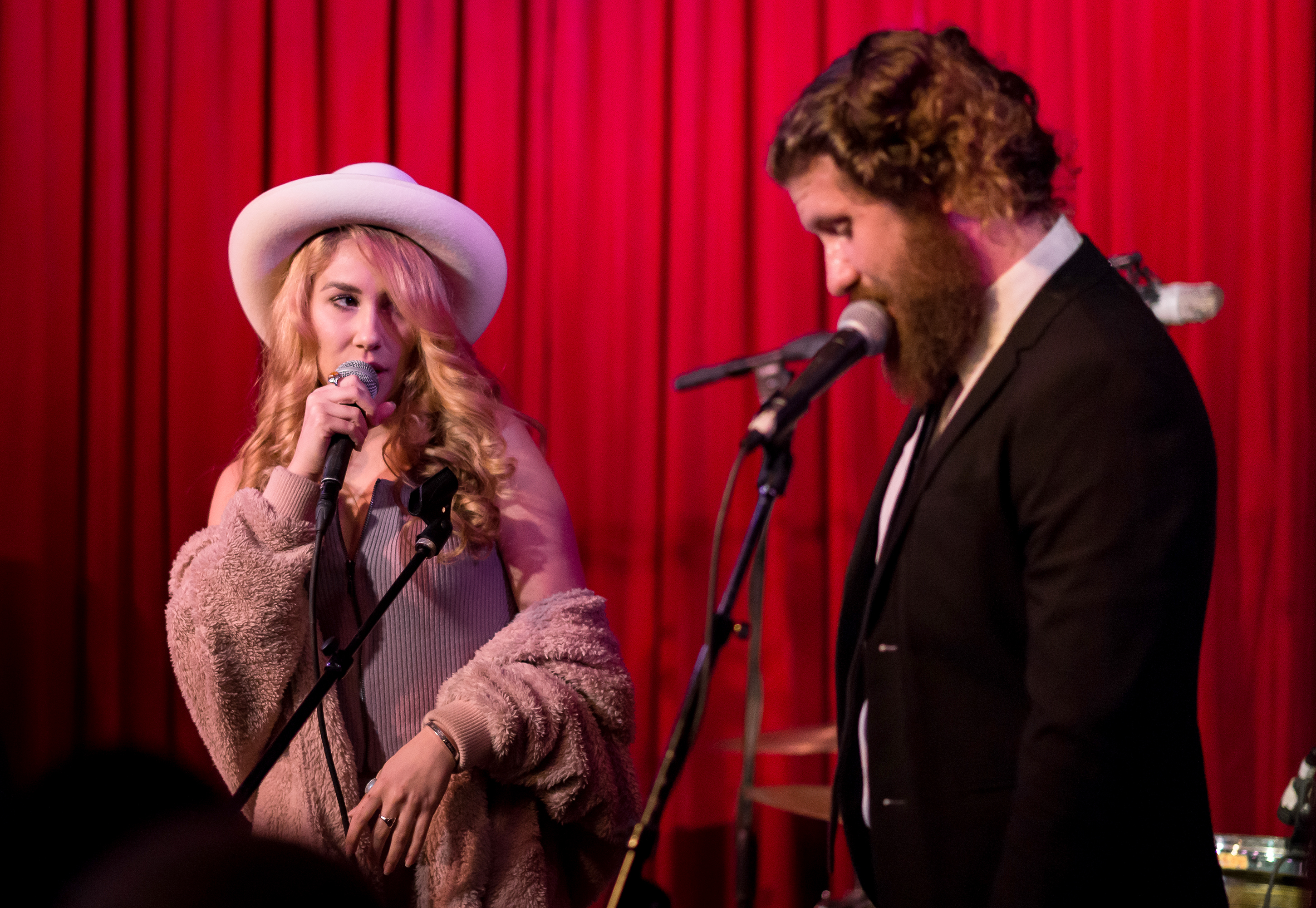
Haley and Casey at Hotel Cafe in 2018

On May 31, 2018, Refinery29 exclusively debuted the music video for Reinhart's single "Last Kiss Goodbye" before its official release on June 1, 2018. Reinhart described the bossa nova-inspired, low-fi pop song as having a raw, stripped down, summery feel that allows her to "move into [her] own light as an artist." Reinhart expressed uncertainty as to whether the single would be a stand-alone release or if it would be included as part of her fourth studio album. The single charted at number 15 on Billboard's Jazz Digital Songs chart. On July 7, 2018, Reinhart was an opening performer for headlining act Steven Tyler at the 31st Annual Ribfest in Naperville, Illinois. On September 23, she debuted new, original tracks during her performance at the "Live in the Vineyard East" concert event which was held at the Blue Ridge Estate Vineyard and Winery.

Reinhart joined jazz pianist Jeff Goldblum as a featured singer on his debut album of jazz standards, The Capitol Studios Sessions, which was released November 9, 2018. She features on the tracks "My Baby Just Cares for Me" and "Gee Baby (Ain't I Good to You)". "My Baby Just Cares for Me" was released as the album's second single, accompanied by a music video released on September 25, which features Goldblum and Reinhart performing the song live. On October 22, 2018, Reinhart presented the Man of Style Award to Goldblum at the 2018 InStyle Awards at the Getty Center in Los Angeles. She sang "Happy Birthday" to him on stage before she gave him the award. The pair performed "My Baby Just Cares for Me" on Jimmy Kimmel Live! on November 8 to promote the album's release.

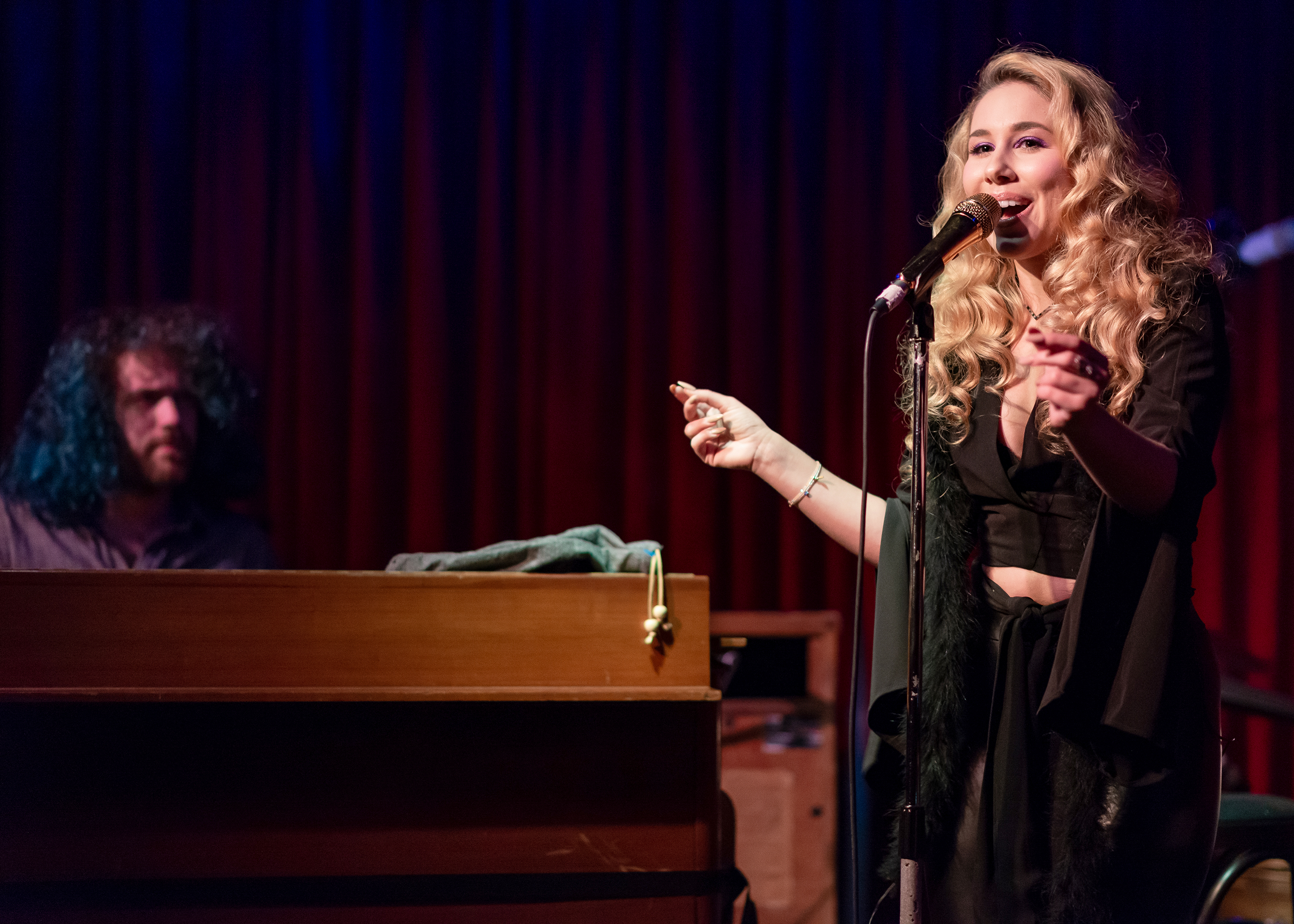
Reinhart performing at the Hotel Cafe in October 2018

Reinhart teamed up with Dutch EDM duo Vicetone on their single "Something Strange", which was released alongside its video on November 2, 2018. The song is described as an upbeat, pop-centric track, with a strong Avicii influence. The single reached a peak at number 23 on Billboard's Dance/Mix Show Airplay chart. Reinhart reprised her starring role as Bill Murphy in the third season of F is for Family, released on November 30, 2018. Additionally, she sang the National Anthem before the SDCCU Holiday Bowl at SDCCU Stadium in San Diego on December 31, 2018.

On September 14, 2018, Reinhart released "Don't Know How to Love You", the lead single from her self-produced fourth studio album, Lo-Fi Soul, which was released independently on March 27, 2019. The title track, "Lo-Fi Soul", was released as the album's second single on February 8, 2019, with the official music video, composed of home footage, debuting on February 15 exclusively through AltPress. The third single, "Honey, There's the Door" was released with its official music video on March 8, 2019. On April 11, 2019, Reinhart released a music video for the album track "Shook", which was filmed in LA's RagDoll Pink Palace. The opening track "Deep Water" was released as the album's fourth official single on July 29, the same day the song was serviced to US AAA radio. The single's official music video, filmed almost exclusively underwater, was directed by Naomi Christie. In support of the album, Reinhart embarked on the Lo-Fi Soul Tour, starting in April 2019 and running for 18 shows. She extended the tour with additional shows on the east coast starting in mid-October, including her first headlining show in Toronto. The tour was extended further, with 12 dates being scheduled throughout Europe in the spring of 2020. All 2020 tour dates were delayed and eventually cancelled due to the COVID-19 pandemic.

Also in 2019, Reinhart partnered with Mazda for a Mazda3 advertisement campaign, "Dream Bigger", in which she sings a featured cover of "Dreams" by The Cranberries. The commercial debuted during the NCAA championship game on April 8, 2019. Reinhart released a full-length version of the song on May 10. Following the release of this cover, Reinhart released Bulletproof on June 14, 2019, a 3-track EP featuring covers of "Bulletproof", "It Ain't Over 'Till It's Over", and "You Send Me". On June 29, Reinhart headlined the fifth annual "Rock the Runway" concert at Chicago Executive Airport in Wheeling, and on August 29, she joined Michael Feinstein at the Ravinia Festival in Highland Park, Illinois. On October 31, 2019, Reinhart released "Santa Baby", her first solo holiday cover song, followed by "Have Yourself a Merry Little Christmas" on November 9 and "The Christmas Song" on November 18.

On December 25, 2020, Reinhart made her film acting debut in Robert Rodriguez's science fiction superhero film We Can Be Heroes. The film, which follows the children of superheroes during an alien invasion, features an ensemble cast including Priyanka Chopra and Christian Slater and was released via Netflix.

=== 2020–present: Singles and upcoming projects ===
Reinhart released her first live single, "Change", on January 3, 2020. The song was recorded at Mercury Lounge in New York City during her 2019 east coast tour. On April 21, 2020, another single was released, a studio cover of Janis Joplin's "Piece of My Heart", which she had previously performed live on American Idol in 2011.

Reinhart will return as a regular cast member for the fourth season of F is for Family, which will be released June 12, 2020. She is also scheduled to perform at ABC 7 Chicago's Virtual Pride event, which will take place June 20 and 21.

In 2025, Reinhart was featured on "Light of My Life", part of The Crooked Moon soundtrack by The Blasting Company.

== Artistry ==
=== Style ===
Reinhart's style has been noted for its infusion of mainstream pop with elements of retro-pop and traditional jazz. Her performances on Idol were often critically praised for their jazzy and bluesy elements built upon a Joplin-esque rock foundation. Reinhart's debut album was also distinguished for its fusion of various musical genres, such as pop, R&B, rock and roll, and soul into a combination that has been described as "timeless and irresistibly fresh". Reinhart has crafted her music to reflect "that raw musicianship that means so much to me." Of her first album she describes "it wasn't about trying so hard; it was all about pure feeling and energy. To me that's the important stuff. That's what I want to bring back into music today." Jason Scott of Popdust noted Reinhart for the "slinky way she delivers a lyric... an unfettered, daring confidence masked with a wink and a smile." In a review for Better, he also opined that "her framework has always been the jazz standards of the '30s and '40s with a lacquered coat of '60s disco, with a bit of soul painted on for equal measure." Zach Dionne for Fuse described Reinhart as a "soulful, jazzy, altogether genre-defying singer-songwriter." Of Reinhart's style, Atwood Magazine noted "from the bluesy rocker-chick during her Idol era to her more pop-driven Motown vibe in her first album Listen Up! to her current jazz-funk fusion sound on her latest album Better, Reinhart has proven time and time again that she is no jack-of-all-trades, but the master and supreme innovator of each one."

Reinhart's neo soul and R&B sounds have been compared to those of her modern contemporaries like Adele, Duffy, and Amy Winehouse, while her retro pop, disco, and jazz sounds have been equated to Nancy Sinatra, Diana Ross and the Supremes, Aretha Franklin, and other Motown artists. Atwood Magazine further attributed Reinhart "with the wild side of Janis Joplin, the class of Ella Fitzgerald, and the cutting-edge influence of Etta James, which proves that there is nothing she can't do."

=== Voice and timbre ===
Reinhart is vocally a light lyric soprano and her range spans three octaves. Reinhart's voice has been praised for its identifiable rasp and growl, which she is able to control for extended periods of time without suffering any vocal degradation. She has been noted for her ability to easily transition from gentle vibratos and whispers in her lower register to "guttural bellows" in her belting register. Reinhart's voice has also received praise for its "smoky", sultry quality and resonant sound. She has been recognized further for the versatility of her voice and for the effective use of her falsetto.

Reinhart has been lauded for her scatting techniques reminiscent of Fitzgerald, as well as for her yodeling. Her frequent call and response sessions during her live performances have also received particular praise. Reinhart's early vocal training came from her mother, and she has never been trained professionally. Growing up, she learned her scatting and call-and-response techniques from her father, who would scat and then make her repeat the sounds back to him.

=== Influences ===
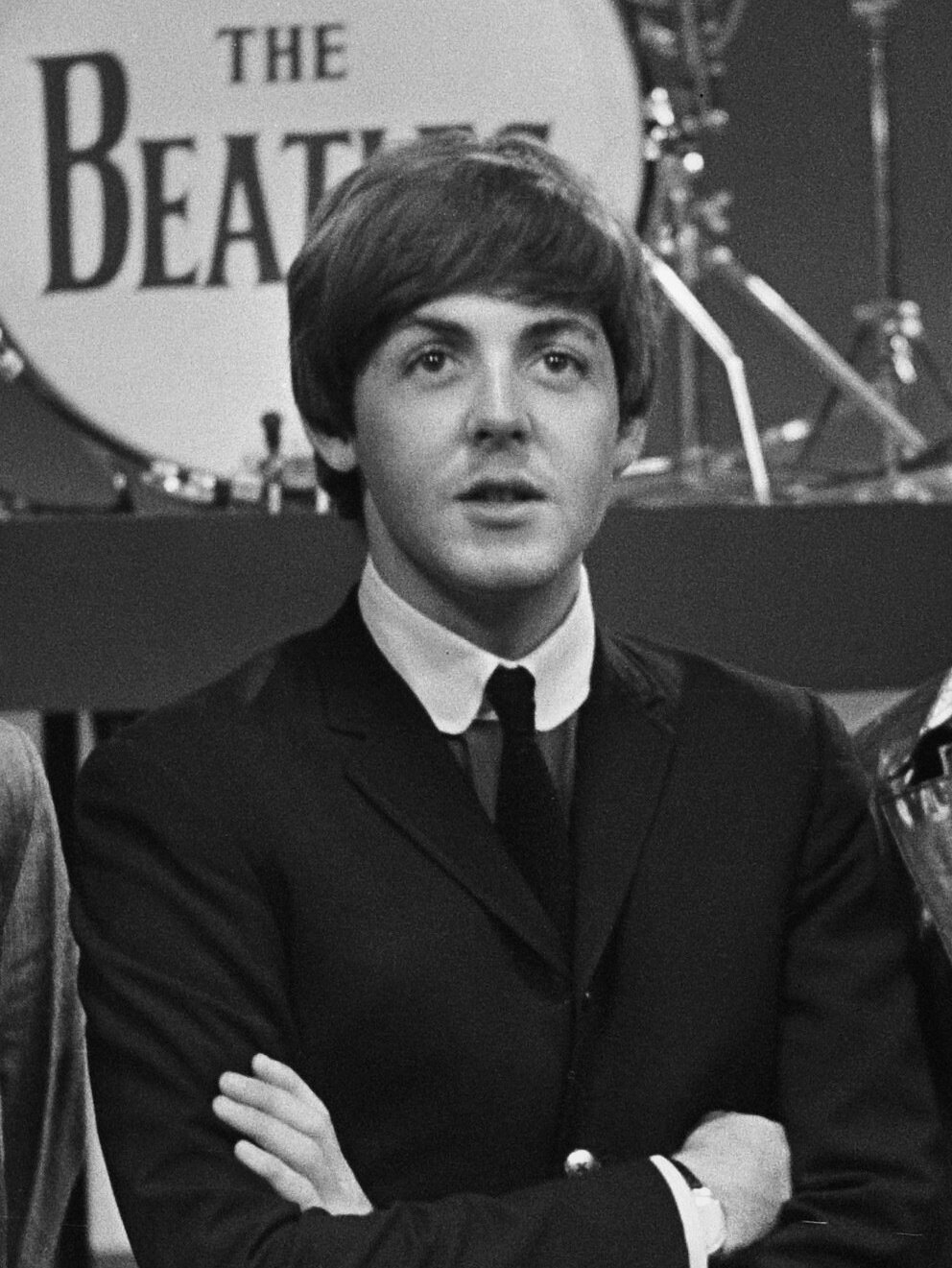
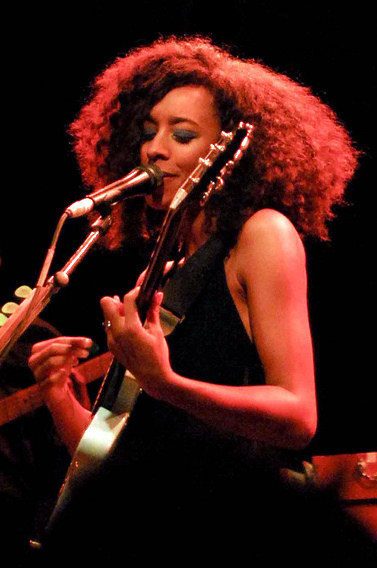
Reinhart has cited Paul McCartney, John Lennon, and Corinne Bailey Rae as major musical and vocal influences.

Reinhart is heavily inspired by various musical genres, including rock and roll, funk, pop, jazz, blues, and even African percussion, due to her parents' eclectic musical tastes while she was growing up. They were fans of rock legends such as Janis Joplin and Jimi Hendrix as well as more traditional pioneering jazz artists. More specifically, she cites The Beatles and band members Paul McCartney and John Lennon as her greatest musical influences. She states that "people always want me to say a female name", and further explains that such an action would not be reality for her and that saying so would be disingenuous. She admires the singers' ability to have smooth, bluesy voices at some points and raw, gritty, visceral voices at others. Due to her parents' influences, she also grew up idolizing such artists as Sarah Vaughan, Heart, and Tony Bennett. When she was young, she also helped her mother learn songs by Billie Holiday. She explains, "I got a really good ear from just shedding out different tunes and learning different genres." Her album Better was heavily inspired by retro funk band Sly and the Family Stone.

Reinhart recalls, as a child, watching Kelly Clarkson win the first season of Idol and becoming subsequently interested in participating in the process. Throughout her time on Idol, the judges consistently compared Reinhart vocally and stylistically to Janis Joplin. This comparison often influenced Reinhart's decision to infuse rock elements into many of her performances, including "House of the Rising Sun" and "You and I". Some of her modern artistic influences during and following her time on the show include Christina Aguilera, Corinne Bailey Rae, Esperanza Spalding, and Janelle Monáe. She respects and admires them for remaining true to their craft and not selling out to the mainstream industry.

She draws acting influences from Lucille Ball, Ann-Margret, and Nancy Sinatra, whom she admires for their audacity, femininity, and beauty. She also prefers surrealist cinema and admires films such as Big Fish, Pleasantville, and American Beauty.

== Personal life ==
=== Relationships and family ===
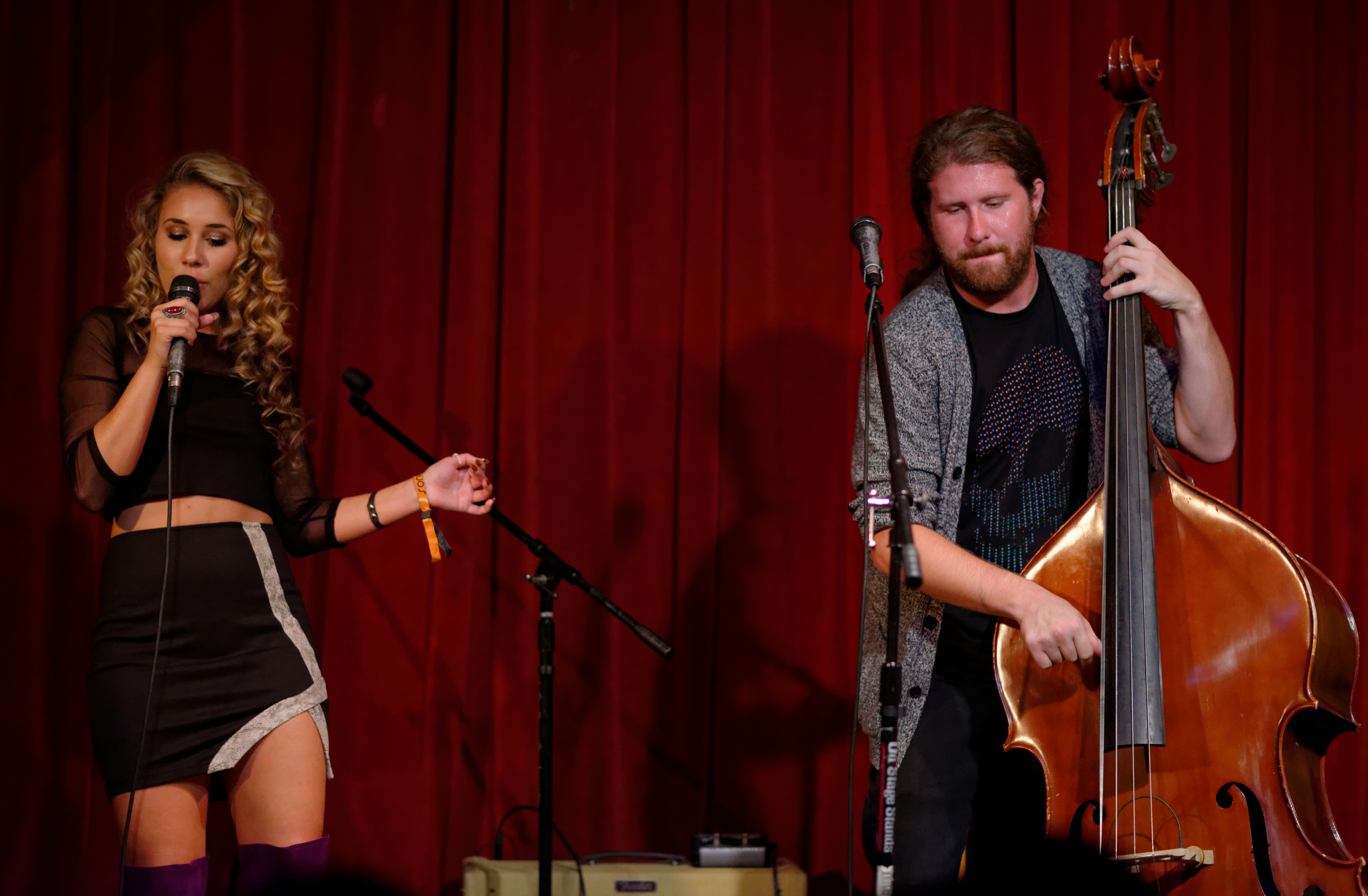
Reinhart Performing with Casey Abrams at Room 5 Lounge in Los Angeles, June 2014

Reinhart is best friends with tenth season alum Casey Abrams, and the pair consider themselves musical soulmates. On Idol, they often helped each other remain calm and fed off each other's musical energy while performing duets. Since then, they have collaborated on numerous occasions for album and single releases and frequently perform with each other at live venues, notably at Room 5 lounge in Los Angeles. Reinhart has also remained close with the other contestants from her season.

Reinhart became the first Idol contestant to perform on stage with a parent during the show when her father played guitar for her performance of "What Is and What Should Never Be".

Reinhart is in a relationship with singer and musician Drew Dolan. Reinhart and Dolan announced their engagement through their social media channels on November 13, 2022.

=== Legal issues ===
On July 8, 2017, Reinhart was arrested for allegedly punching a bouncer. Reinhart's lawyer, Dina LaPolt, says that Reinhart was assaulted by bouncers at Lamplighter Inn in Palatine, Illinois, without provocation and forcefully removed while a friend was beaten, sustaining multiple injuries. Following a TMZ video of the incident, a July 17, 2017, press release from the attorney of Reinhart's friend, Alan Chislof, stated Chislof had been restrained, choked, and beaten by bouncers for Lamplighter Inn. He sustained a concussion, a cut above his left eye requiring stitches, and broken blood vessels in his eyes. Chislof also said that the group had not flipped over a table as stated by the bouncers; instead, Reinhart had touched a rope separating the table area and the dancefloor, which angered them and caused them to escort her out aggressively. Reinhart's attorney denied that she had struck anyone. On July 20, 2017, it was reported that Lamplighter bouncer Adam Sobanski had been charged with aggravated battery in relation to the incident. Sobanski appeared in court on August 11, 2017, where he was indicted on two counts of aggravated battery. Reinhart was found guilty on a battery charge on February 26, 2018, and ordered to pay a $500 fine, $139 in court costs, and has the possibility of getting the conviction cleared from her record after a two-year probation period if she has no further criminal violations. On May 2, 2018, Sobanski pleaded guilty to a reduced charge of misdemeanor battery and was sentenced to probation, anger management counseling, and 60 days in the Cook County Sheriff's Work Alternative Program as a substitute for jail time.

== Philanthropy ==
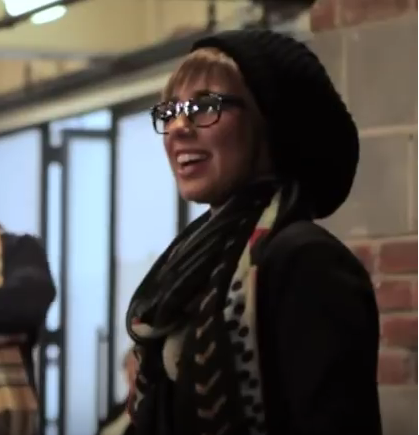
Reinhart performs on Tip Cup to raise money for the MusiCares Foundation, 2012

Shortly after her stint on American Idol, Reinhart participated in VH1's Do Something Awards. She had already been working with Habitat for Humanity and Starkey Hearing Foundation, and she attended the Do Something Awards to become involved with charities that help fight domestic violence and bullying. Reinhart explains "I've been the counselor to a lot of my friends growing up, so helping people comes naturally to me. That's what all of us are meant to do: send out good vibes, good messages and help out." On December 5, 2011, Reinhart performed at the 4th Annual Holiday Tree Lighting at L.A. Live. The event served as a fundraiser to help end hunger and homelessness locally and to support health care services for the needy.

Reinhart's 2012 performance with Slash and Myles Kennedy at the Keep Memory Alive "Power of Love" Gala helped raise funds for the Cleveland Clinic's Lou Ruvo Center for Brain Health and the Muhammad Ali Center in Louisville, Kentucky. Additionally, Reinhart was a headlining performer at the Girls Who Rock concert in New York City, an annual charity concert that supports girls and education on a global scale. Also in 2012, Reinhart partnered with Tip Cup to collect money for MusiCares, a foundation that aims to support musicians during times of financial trouble. She disguised herself and performed a few songs at Chelsea Market, while passersby donated money to a cup set in front of her. At the end of the stunt, she revealed her true identity and true intentions to the fans. In September 2012, Reinhart signed a golf ball for Magnificent Moments's "Tartan Art on the Avenue" fundraiser, held at the 39th Ryder Cup in Chicago. Reinhart's golf ball and balls signed by several other notable celebrities were auctioned off to raise money for Ronald McDonald House Charities and the Illinois PGA Foundation. During the same month, she performed an acoustic set at the Girl Scout Cookie Classic to honor the organization's 100th anniversary. After her performances, Reinhart offered personal advice to the group and then invited girl scouts on stage to discuss community involvement and benefit projects within the organization. The following year, Reinhart performed her cover of "Bennie and the Jets" at Muhammad Ali's Celebrity Fight Night XIX, an event benefiting the Muhammad Ali Parkinson's Center at Barrow Neurological Institute in Phoenix.

In 2015, Reinhart joined her father for a concert at the Chicago Auto Show First Look Charity Event, held in February. Additionally, in mid-December she performed for the children at UC Davis Children's Hospital in Sacramento, California, with the help of Casey Abrams, before joining radio DJ Kory for Mix 96's "Mix Cares For Kids" Radiothon, which was held inside of the hospital. As part of her 2016 radio promotion tour for "Can't Help Falling in Love", Reinhart performed with The Band Perry at Revolution Hall on February 20, 2016, for The Buzz's concert in support of the Children's Cancer Association. She also performed for a special Mix Lounge live event at the Boston Flower & Garden Show Preview Party on March 15, 2016. All proceeds were donated to the Genesis Foundation for Children. Also in March, Reinhart performed at Dell Children's Medical Center during SXSW as part of the "West of the Fest" venue. The show was sponsored by the Children's Cancer Association and aimed to "infuse the hospital environment with the healing power of music."

On April 30, 2016, Reinhart held a Better benefit concert at Durty Nellie's Pub in Palatine, Illinois for the development of multimedia sexual abuse prevention curriculum for the PAVE and Erin's Law organizations. Her concert was held in conjunction with The Empowerment Summit, which provided professional presentations on topics including sexual abuse and mental health. Of the show, Reinhart stated:

"the new album is going to be released the day before, so it's going to be a big homecoming on lots of levels. I'm also going to have my parents' band backing me up for that show, which is going to be great. And the cause itself is something I've really wanted to put energy and time into since I was a young girl. Plus, April happens to be Sexual Assault awareness month. I'm just happy to be a part of it."

On January 28, 2017, Reinhart served as a celebrity guest judge alongside Casey Abrams, Clark Beckham, and Anthony Federov for an American Idol-style benefit concert, Rally Idol, which featured performances by six children affected by childhood cancer. Produced by television production technology students at the Chattahoochee Technical College, all proceeds from the event went to the Rally Foundation, which works to find cures and treatments for childhood cancers. On October 7, 2017, Reinhart performed at the 4th Annual Pongo Environmental Awards in West Pasadena, California. The event honored environmental achievement in film, science, conservation, and technology, and celebrated Orang Utan Republik Foundation's (OURF) tenth anniversary as well as their mission to save critically endangered Orangutans and their habitat.

On September 29, 2018, Reinhart sang at PAVE's benefit concert at the Patio Theater in Portage Park, Chicago. A limited meet and greet was offered for attendees who participated in a fundraising contest, with funds once again benefiting sexual assault awareness and prevention education. Some proceeds from the concert also benefited Seleh Freedom, an organization that fights human trafficking. On January 16, 2020, Reinhart performed at the Hotel Café as part of a fundraising event in support of the Bushfires in Australia. On January 23, Reinhart performed with Robby Krieger and John Densmore at the Homeward Bound charity concert, with benefits supporting efforts to fight homelessness throughout California.

== Discography ==
- Listen Up! (2012)
- Better (2016)
- What's That Sound? (2017)
- Lo-Fi Soul (2019)
- Off the Ground (2022)

== Concert tours ==
Headlining

- Better Tour (2016–17)
- What's That Sound? Tour (2017)
- Lo-Fi Soul Tour (2019–Spring & Fall)
- Off The Ground Tour (2022–23)

Supporting

- American Idols LIVE! Tour 2011 (2011)
- Postmodern Jukebox World Tour (2015)
- Postmodern Jukebox European Tour (London) (2016)
- Postmodern Jukebox European Tour (Monaco, Italy, Germany, France) (2017)

== Filmography ==
- American Idol (2011, 2012, 2016, 2022)
- Hell's Kitchen (2012)
- 90210 (2012)
- Real Music Live (2013)
- F Is for Family (2015–2021)
- We Can Be Heroes (2020)
- Americana (short film) (2022)
