= Something Strange =

Single by Vicetone featuring Haley Reinhart

from the album Elements
- Released: November 2, 2018
- Genre: House music
- Length: 3:10
- Label: Monstercat
- Songwriter(s): Haley Reinhart
- Producer(s): Ruben den Boer, Victor Pool

Vicetone singles chronology
"South Beach" (2018)	"Something Strange" (2018)	"Fences" (2019)

Music video
- "Something Strange" on YouTube

"Something Strange" is a house song by Dutch electronic music duo Vicetone featuring American singer-songwriter Haley Reinhart. It was released on 2 November 2018 by independent record label Monstercat.

"Something Strange" is the lead single off Vicetone's extended play Elements. It peaked at 23 on Billboard's Dance/Mix Show Airplay charts.

== Background ==
In an interview with Billboard, Den Boer and Pool said about the song's performance: "We put a lot of effort into making this track special and we want to incorporate a lot of organic instruments. We're really happy how the track turned out and it's very rewarding to see it perform well." Talking about the songwriting with CelebMix, Reinhart said "This tune has such electricity in it, as the lyric expresses a darker side of a relationship."

== Reception ==
Grant Gilmore of EDMIdentity described the song as "relatable to anyone who has had to say goodbye to someone who broken another’s trust and is not deserving of their love." Katie Stone of EDM.com called the song " an upbeat, pop-centric track with a not-so-upbeat meaning." Omar Serrano of Run the Trap called the song "a melodic fireball" and praised the vocals for its "devils advocate" hook. Talking about Elements as a whole, Brett Callwood of LA Weekly praised the song for its melodic intro and the contrasting tones between the lyrics and production.

== Charts ==
Chart (2019)	Peak position
US Dance/Mix Show Airplay (Billboard)	23
