= Canyon Moon =

Canyon Moon may refer to:

- "Canyon Moon", a 2014 song by Andrew McMahon from Andrew McMahon in the Wilderness
- "Canyon Moon", a 2019 song by Harry Styles from Fine Line
