= Anders Grahn =

Swedish songwriter, multi-instrumentalist, vocal coach

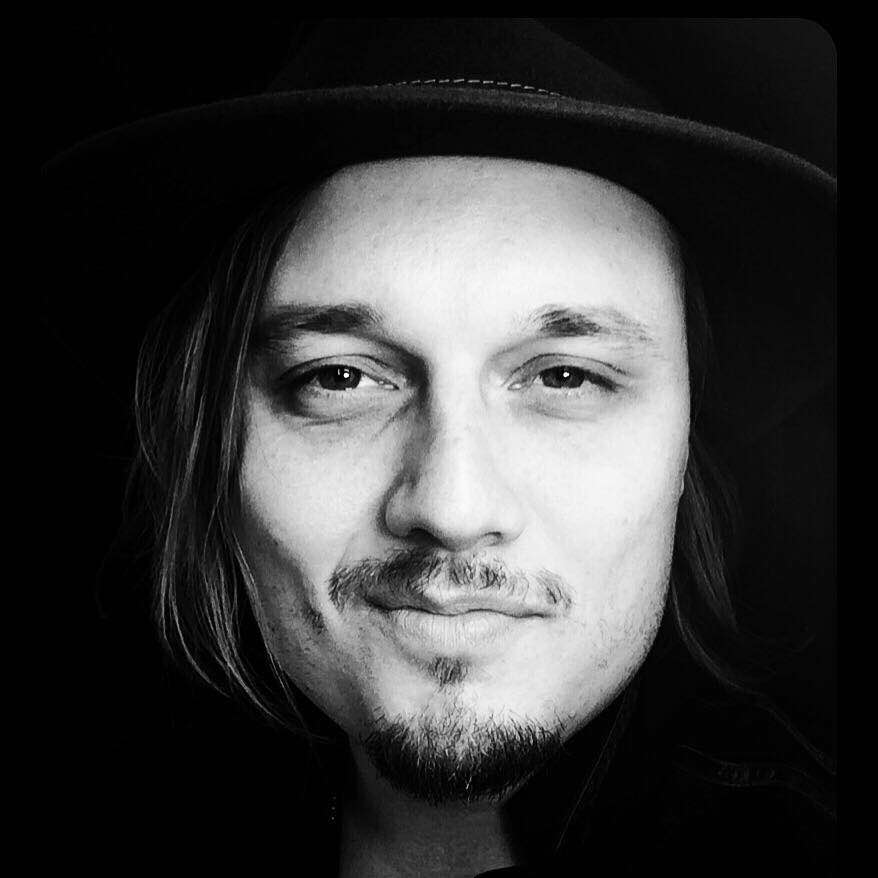

Background information
- Born: Anders Grahn; June 12, 1979 (age 46); Malmö, Sweden
- Genres: Pop; Rock; Soul; Blues
- Occupations: Songwriter; Producer; Musician; Guitarist; Vocalist
- Labels: Copyright controller

Anders Grahn is a Swedish songwriter, multi-instrumentalist, vocal coach and producer based in Sweden.

== Songwriting and producing ==
=== Gordo ===
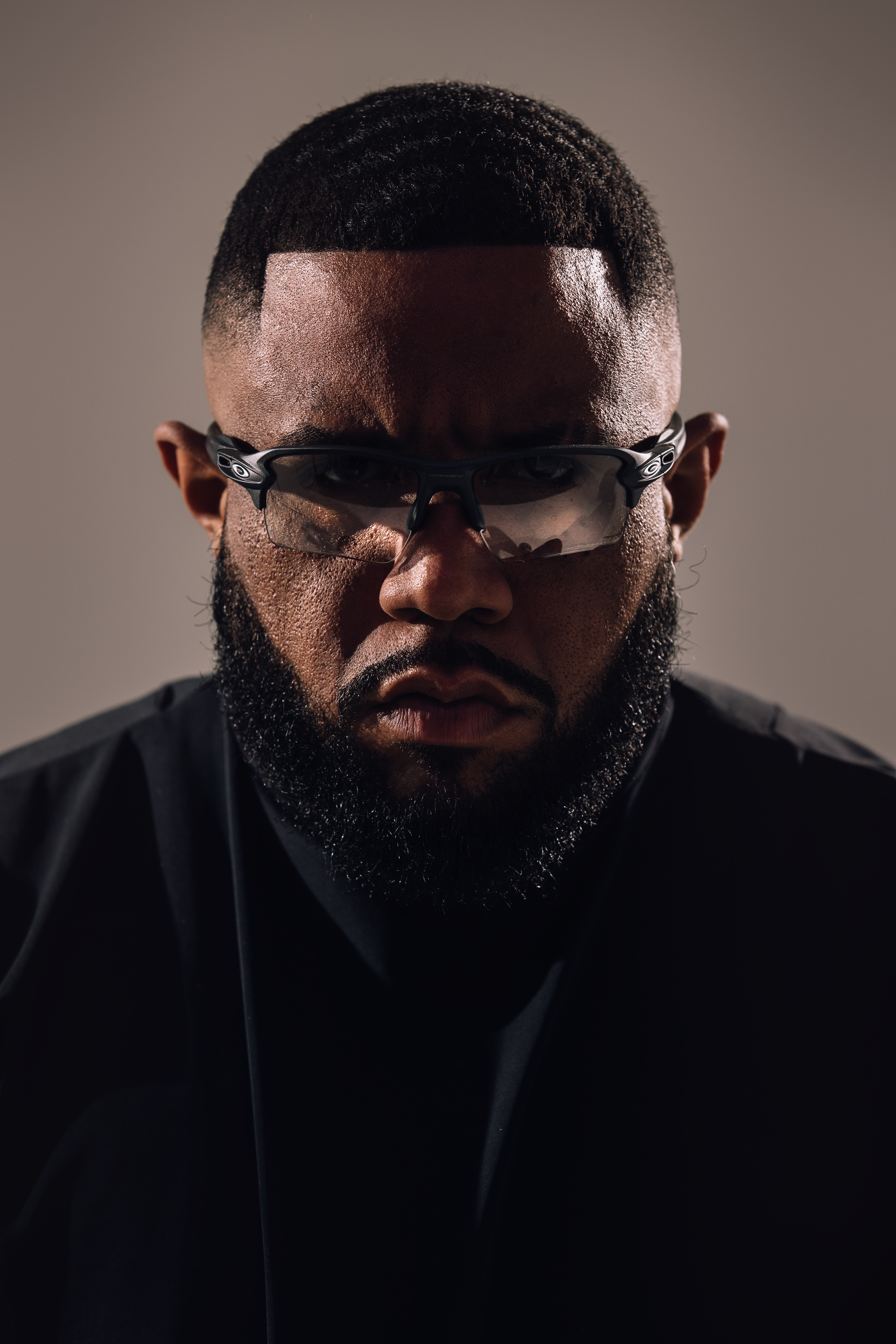
Gordo

Anders Grahn is involved having co-written and co-produced 4 out of 16 songs on the Gordo new album ”Diamante”.
One of the leading singles “With you” (GORDO & Adriatique) - not on the album - was also co-written and co-produced by Anders.

The Guatemalan-American DJ, Gordo (formerly known as DJ Carnage), released his long anticipated debut album - “Diamante” - Friday, July 26, 2024. The album features two songs with Drake and holds features with - T-Pain - Leon Bridges - Feid - Maluma - Rampa - NTO - Yung Gravy - Larry Jube - Nicki Nicole- Sech - Fuerza Regida - Alice Aera and Karolina Falk. Drake is also credited as executive Producer on the album.

Anders Grahn track list - “Diamante”
WDYM (What do you mean)
Easier
Take control
Aura

=== Armin van Buuren ===
Armin van Buuren releases the single ”When We Come Alive” together with Israeli super duo Vini Vici featuring ALBA on vocals. The single is co-written by Anders Grahn who’s also doing background vocals on the track.

=== The Black Eyed Peas ===
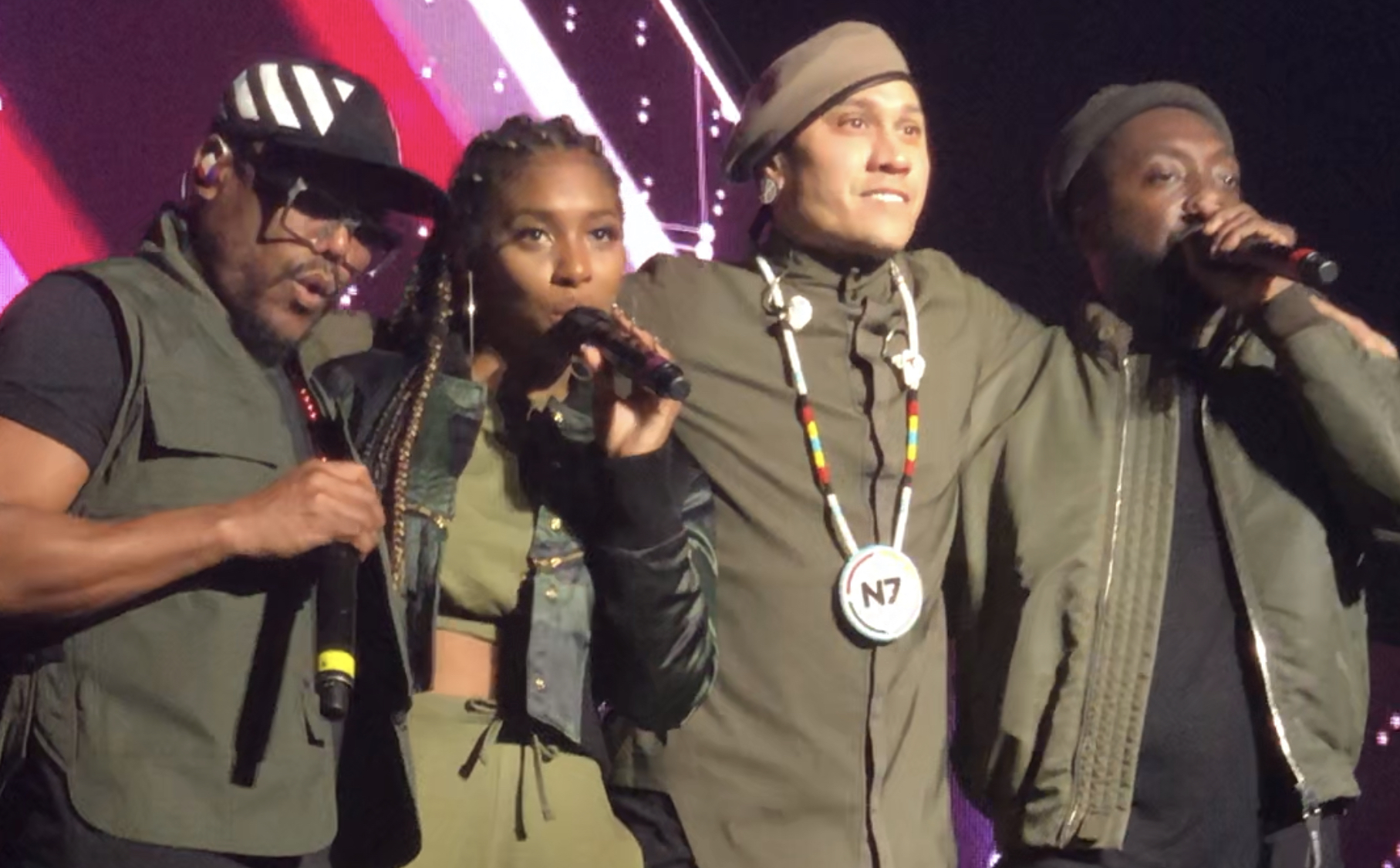
Black Eyed Peas performing at O2 Apollo Manchester on 1 November 2018.

"BIG LOVE" by the Black Eyed Peas is co-written by Anders Grahn, who also is one of the prominent vocalists in the song's chorus. BIG LOVE was released as the main single for the Grammy-winning group's album Masters of the Sun, release on 12 October 2018. The graphic video, a 9-minute double video for the same song with two different stories, addresses both school shootings in the United States, as well as children being taken from their parents by the border to the US, and is a collaboration with two organizations, March For Our Lives and Families Belong Together.

=== Anastacia ===
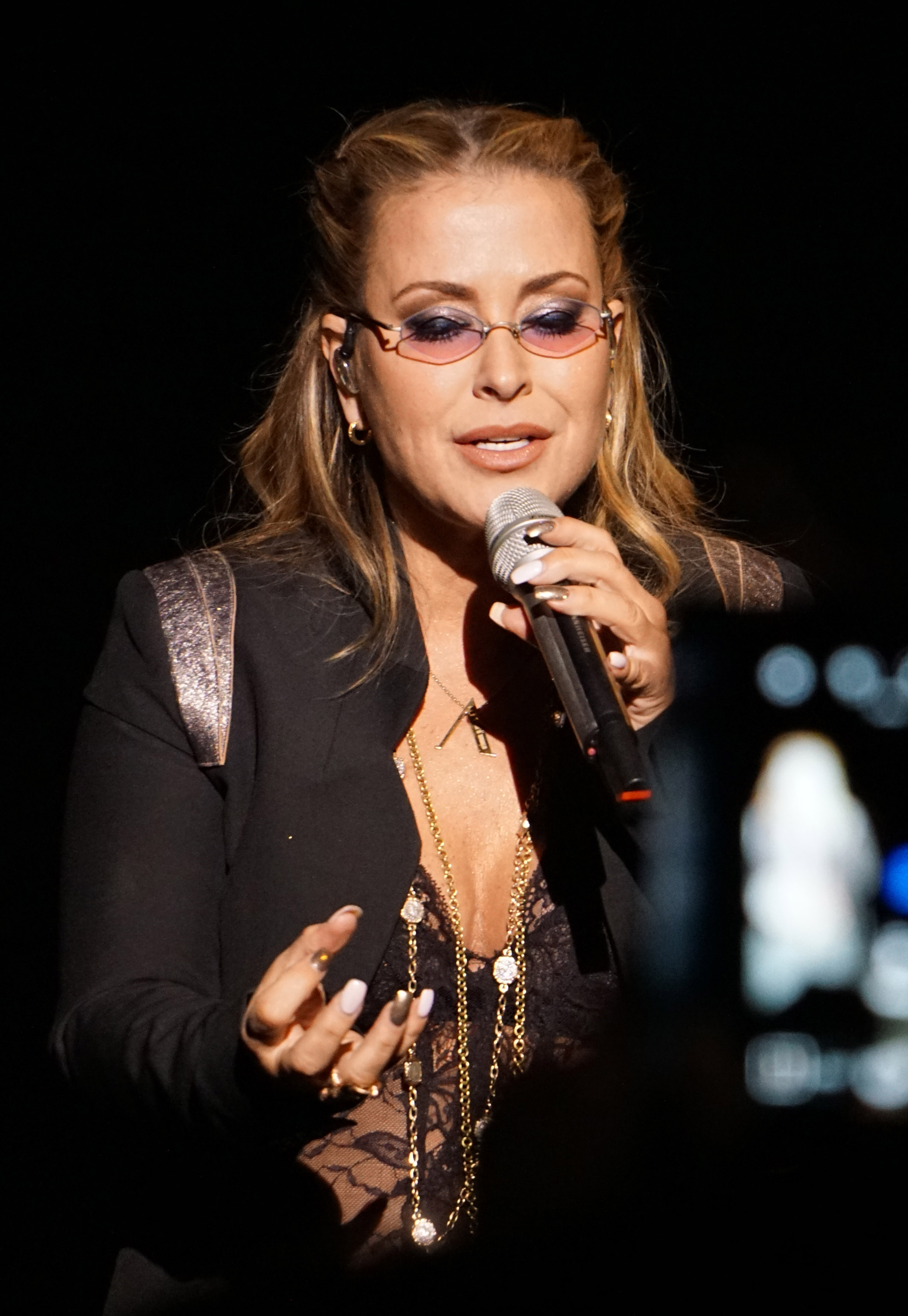
Anastacia

Grahn is one of the writers ("Why" and "Higher Living") and additional producers ("Before" and "Reckless") as well as guitarist, background singer, percussionist and bass player on Anastacia's album Evolution. Released 15 September 2017. During 2017 and 2018 Grahn has been touring as guitarist with Anastacia on her Ultimate Collection Tour and Evolution Tour in a total of 110 shows in 25 countries.

=== Andrew McMahon ===
"Cecilia and the Satellite" features in the CBS superhero action drama, Supergirl, as well as in the TV spot for the Warner Bros. Pictures film Pan and the Fox Network series Red Band Society. In 2018, it was featured in the trailer for the motion picture Welcome to Marwen. The single went gold (500,000 units sold) in the U.S. on 28 June 2016.

=== Haley Reinhart ===
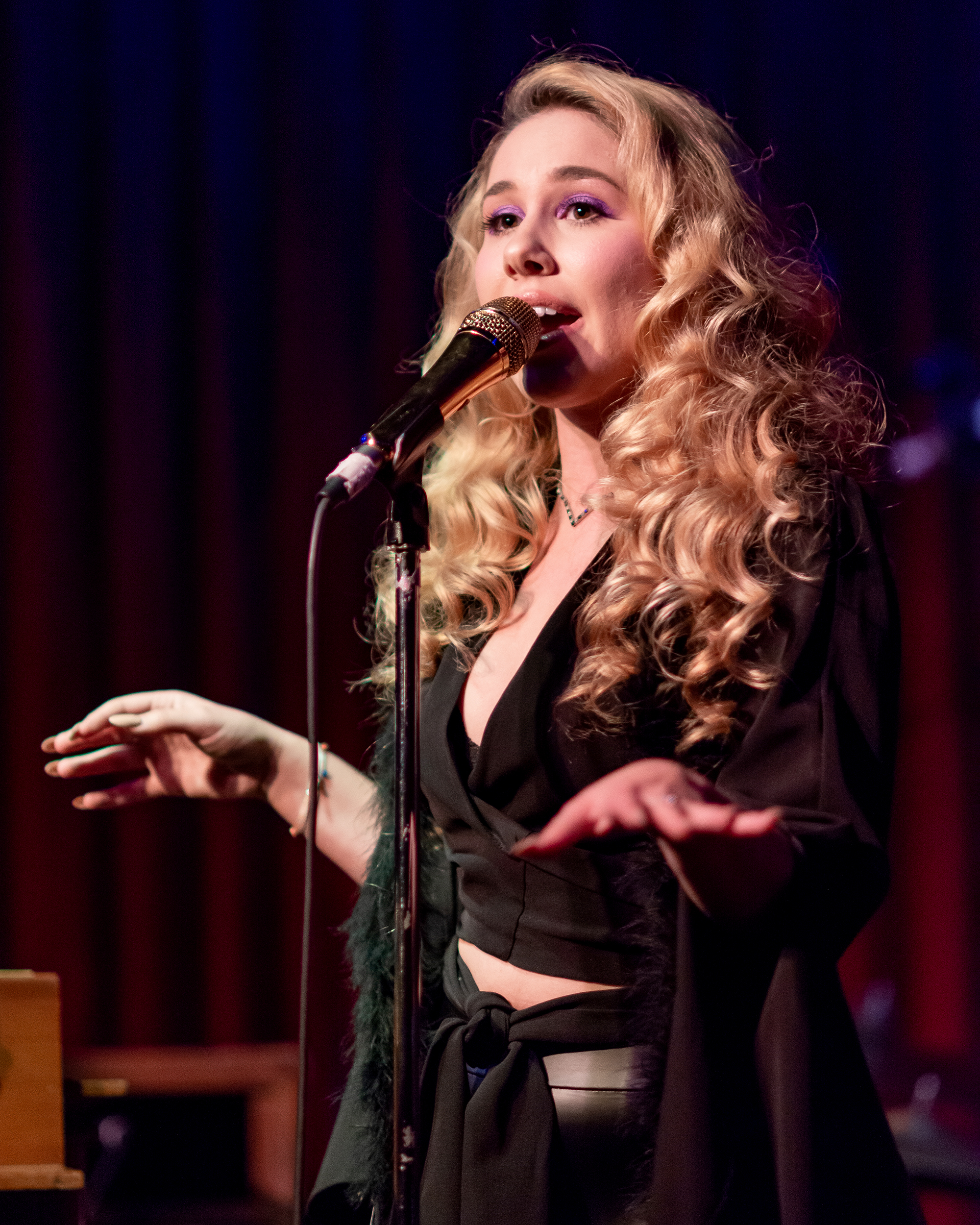
Haley performing at the Hotel Cafe in October 2018

2016
Grahn has co-written 5 of the 11 tracks on Haley Reinhart's full-length album Better. The title track was released as the lead single, "Listen," co-written with Reinhart and Maria Marcus, was featured in the trailer of the showtime Network series Years of Living Dangerously, executive produced by James Cameron. The album debuted at no. 22 on the Billboard Independent Albums Chart in May 2016.

2017
On 15 September 2017, the single & video for "Let's Start" was released. Co-written with Reinhart and Rob Kleiner, the song is one out of just three original songs on the album What's That Sound? (Concord Records). The same trio also wrote "Somewhere In Between."

2018
In June 2018, Reinhart did a flash release of the 2.5-minute long bossa-nova, "Last Kiss Goodbye," written by Reinhart and Grahn. The writing duo also produced the song together.
"Don't Know How To Love You" is written by Grahn, Reinhart and Rob Kleiner. The song became the fastest-growing original song for Reinhart since 2011. The American rapper Russel Vitale, aka RUSS, released the mini EP "Just In Case" on 23 December 2018.

2022
A.G produced the EP ”Off The Ground” in Malmö, Sweden together with close friend, and acclaimed producer, artist and musician, Tingsek, during 2020-2021. Anders is also the co-writer on five out of the seven tracks on this EP/Album.

”Lovergirl” and ”21st Century” were both written in London, UK and date all the way back to 2015. Anders & Haley wrote ”Lovergirl” together, and the latter title was penned together with H.R and
Bhavik Pattani (a.k.a. BHAV). ”Change” was written in L.A together with H.R and musical mastermind
Rob Kleiner in 2019, and the last two titles, ”Looking At You” (feat. Tingsek) and ”Roll The Dice” were created during the process of recording this EP in 2021, both co-written with Tingsek, and Haley of course - over zoom from L.A.

=== TVXQ ===
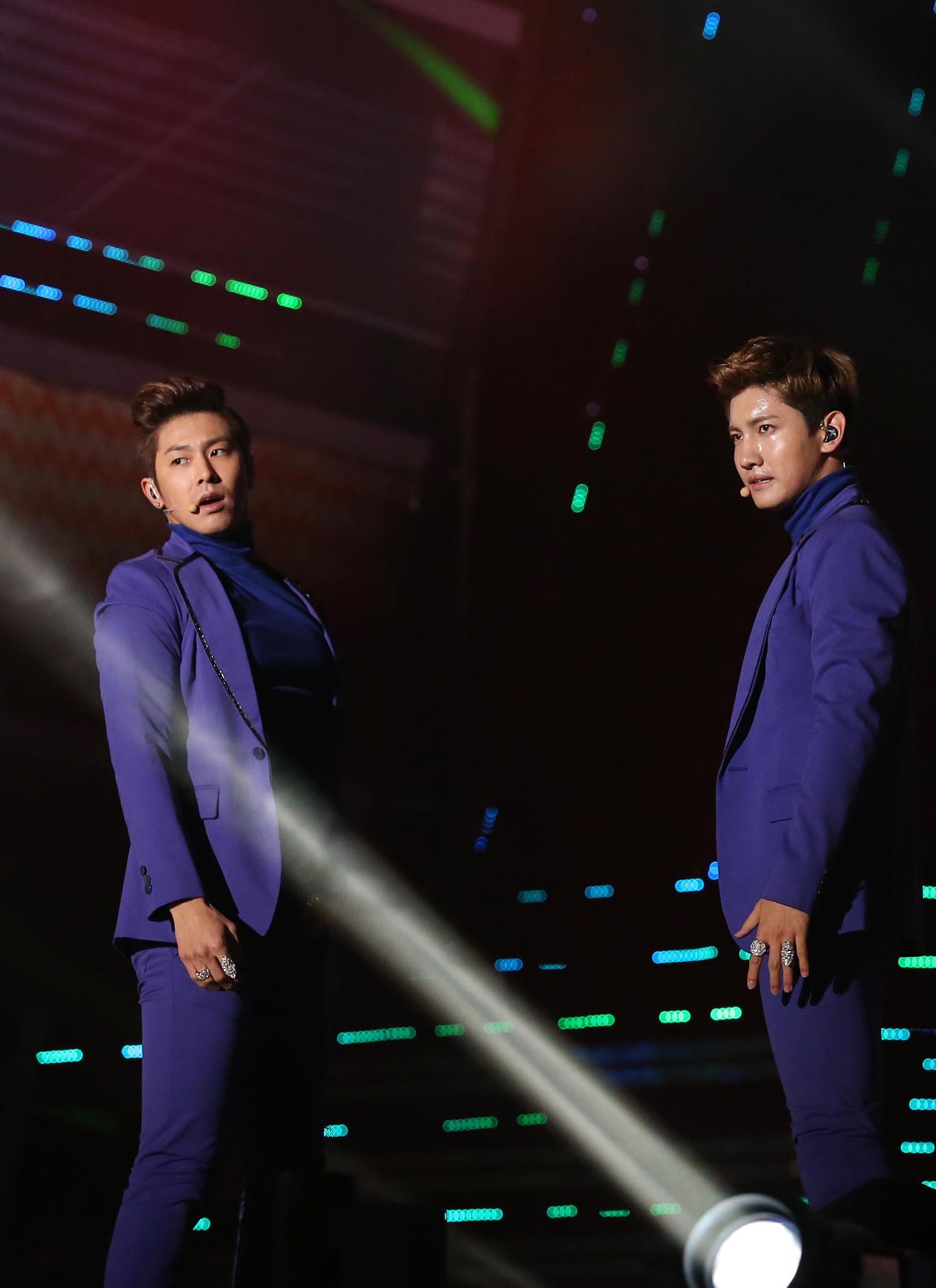
TVXQ

The single "Android" with the Korean band TVXQ went gold in just one day, and it was the best-selling album in the world during its week of release in the spring of 2013. It went platinum in Japan a few weeks after coming out on the market and together with two other tracks for the same band, "Disvelocity" and "Tree of Life," approximately 1,500,000 units were sold. The two other songs written by Anders have both sold gold and platinum in Japan as well.

In October 2017, TVXQ released its greatest hits album Fine collection - Begin again featuring both "Android" and "Tree of life." After two days it became the best selling album of the week in Japan.

=== Hayley Kiyoko ===
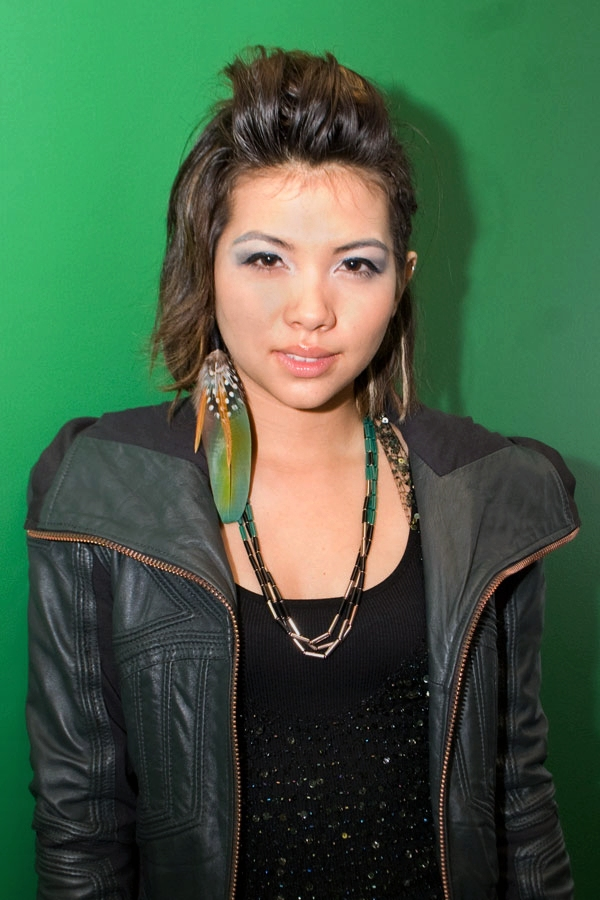
Kiyoko

Grahn, James Flannigan and the singer/songwriter/actress Hayley Kiyoko cowrote "Rich Youth" featured on Hayley's EP A Belle to Remember, released in 2013 and "Given it All," featured on the EP This Side of Paradise, released in 2015.

== Discography ==
Year	Artist	Song	Album	Credit	Awards
2024	Bryce Vine	"Saturday night”		Writer	
2024	Gordo and NTO	"Aura"	Diamante	Writer/Producer	
2024	Gordo feat Karolina Falk	"WDYM (What do you mean"	Diamante	Writer/Producer	
2024	Gordo	"Take control"	Diamante	Writer/Producer	
2024	Gordo	"Easier"	Diamante	Writer/Producer	
2023	Gordo and Adriatique	"With you”		Writer/Producer	
2023	Showtek	"All we need”		Writer	
2023	Armin van Buuren, Vini Vici & ALBA	"When We Come Alive”			
2023	Parker Lane	"Brave"	Kaleidoscope		
2023	Parker Lane	"The best (let it go)"	Kaleidoscope		
2023	Parker Lane	"How you feel"	Kaleidoscope		
2023	Parker Lane	"Good to me"	Kaleidoscope		
2023	Parker Lane	"Fire”	Kaleidoscope		
2023	Parker Lane	”Ohio”	Kaleidoscope		
2023	Parker Lane	”Excusas”	Kaleidoscope		
2023	Showtek & Ookay	”BT1"			
2022	Showtek feat. sonofsteve	"One life”			
2022	Haley Reinhart	"Lovergirl"	Off the ground		
2022	Haley Reinhart	"Roll the dice"	Off the ground		
2022	Haley Reinhart	"Change"	Off the ground		
2022	Haley Reinhart	"21st Century"	Off the ground		
2022	Haley Reinhart	"Looking at you"(feat. Tingsek)	Off the ground		
2022	Beta Lenska	"Deal Chwil (Bailando)"	Off the ground		
2022	Tritonal - Sarah de Warren	"Signals"			
2022	Sarah de Warren	"Vegan Leather Sneakers"			
2022	Anastacia	"American Night"			
2022	DJ T.H. & Sarah de Warren	"Catcher in the Rye"			
2021	Michael Patrick Kelly	"Icon"	B.O.A.T.S		
2021	Cheat Codes	"Dummy"(with Oli Sykes from Bring Me the Horizon)			
2021	Austn	"Touch"			
2021	Haley Reinhart	"Roll The Dice"			
2021	Kerri Watt	"Spoonful of Sugar"			
2021	Junge Junge feat. sonofsteve	"Closer"			
2021	Tingsek	"Looking at you" (feat. Haley Reinhart)	Home		
2021	Tingsek	"Resonate"	Home		
2021	Tingsek	"Genuine"	Home		
2021	Black Gatsby	"Who Da Man"			
2020	Showtek feat. sonofsteve	"Show some love"			
2020	To kill a king	"Wounded"			
2020	sonofsteve	"Dreams" (cover version)			
2020	Black Gatsby	"Change"			
2020	X. ARI	"Take me home"			
2020	Neon Capital	"Grow a new heart"			
2020	Brando	"Millennial Rhapsody"			
2020	Corti Organ & Sarah De Warren	"Better one"			
2020	Nick Merico	"Natural"			
2020	Natalie Major	"The Moon"			
2020	sonofsteve	"Coming Back"			
2020	Shayna Zaid	"The One"			
2020	Haley Reinhart	"Change"			
2019	Bleona	"Haters"			
2019	Ramon Esteve feat. sonofsteve	"Comeback"			
2019	Haley Reinhart	"Crack the Code"	Lo-Fi Soul		
2019	Haley Reinhart	"Don't Know How to Love You"	Lo-Fi Soul		
2019	Haley Reinhart	"Broken Record"	Lo-Fi Soul		
2019	Thomas Gold feat. sonofsteve	"Gold"			
2019	Bleona	"I Don't Need Your Love"		( 1 ) US Billboard Dance Club Songs chart	
2019	Alex Vargas	"What You Wish For"			
2018	Rozzi	"Lose my Number"	Bad Together		
2018	The Black Eyed Peas	"Big Love"	Masters of the Sun		
2018	Russ	”Nobody Knows”			
2018	Haley Reinhart	"Don't Know How to Love You"			
2018	Kelsy Karter	"God Knows I’ve Tried"			
2018	Haley Reinhart	"Last Kiss Goodbye"			
2018	Kelsy Karter	"Easy Tiger"			
2017	sonofsteve	"Not Enough"			
2017	Lions Head	"Golden"	The Night B4 Xmas		
2017	Alex Francis	"What You're Looking For"	A Stronger Love		
2017	TVXQ	"Android"	Fine Collection - Begin Again	(1) Japan Billboard Top Album Sales Chart	
2017	TVXQ	"Tree of Life"	Fine Collection - Begin Again		
2017	Anastacia	"Why"	Evolution		
2017	Anastacia	"Higher Livin"	Evolution		
2017	Haley Reinhart	"Let's Start"	What's that Sound?	(67) US Top Album Sales	
2017	Haley Reinhart	"Somewhere in Between"	What's that Sound?		
2017	Alex Francis	"Borderline"	These Words		
2017	Tingsek	"Lie to Me"			
2017	To Kill a King	"The Good Old Days"			
2017	Morten Nørgaard (XFactor, Denmark)	"The Underdog"	The Underdog		
2016	Kiah Victoria	"Hollow"	Everybody		
2016	Tingsek	"The Fiddlers"	Amygdala		
2016	Tingsek	"Maggie & Al"	Amygdala		
2016	Haley Reinhart	"Better"	Better	(22) US Independent Albums	
2016	Haley Reinhart	"Listen"	Better		
2016	Haley Reinhart	"Bad Light"	Better		
2016	Haley Reinhart	"Talkin' About"	Better		
2016	Haley Reinhart	"Good or Bad"	Better		
2016	MakeBelieve	"The River"	Matter of Time		
2015	Hayley Kiyoko	"Given It All"	This Side of Paradise		
2015	Hayley Kiyoko	"Feeding the Fire"	This Side of Paradise		
2014	Andrew McMahon in the Wilderness	"Cecilia and the Satellite"	Andrew McMahon in the Wilderness	(96) US Billboard hot 100 ( 7 ) US Billboard Adult Alternative (10) US Billboard Adult Pop ( 5 ) US Billboard Alternative ( 6 ) US Billboard Hot Rock	RIAA Gold Record (US) (June 2016)
2014	TVXQ	"Tree of Life"	Tree	( 1) Oricon Japanese Albums Chart ( 1) Billboard Japan Top Albums (15) Gaon South Korean Albums Chart ( 2) Gaon South Korean Int. Albums Chart ( 9) G-Music Taiwanese Albums Chart ( 4) G-Music]Taiwanese East Asian Albums Chart	RIAJ Platinum Album (Japan, March 2014)
2014	Rebecca Ferguson	"Heroes"	Justin and the Knights of Valour		
2014	Alexander Holmgren	"Christmas Was Made for Two"			
2013	The United	"Stay Young"	Stay Young		
2013	Hayley Kiyoko	"Rich Youth"	A Belle to Remember		
2013	Bo Bruce	"Golden"	Before I Sleep	(10) UK Albums Chart	
2013	TVXQ	"Disvelocity"			
2012	TVXQ	"Android"	Time	( 1) Billboard Japan Hot Singles Sales ( 2) Billboard Japan Hot 100 Weekly (35) Billboard Japan Hot Top Airplay (34) Billboard Japan Adult Contemporary Airplay ( 1) Oricon Daily Singles Chart ( 1) Oricon Weekly Singles Chart ( 4) Oricon Monthly Singles Chart (40)Oricon Yearly Singles Chart	RIAJ Gold Record (Japan, July 2012) RIAJ Platinum Album (Japan, 2013)
2010	Magnus Bäcklund	"Julens Hemlighet"			
2007	CLARK	"Love"		Our Best Second Album	
2007	CLARK	"Today"		Our Best Second Album	
2007	CLARK	"Yeah Baby"		Our Best Second Album	
2007	CLARK	"I Do You Do"		Our Best Second Album	
2007	CLARK	"Love Song"		Our Best Second Album	
2007	CLARK	"Living My Life"		Our Best Second Album	
2007	CLARK	"All About You"		Our Best Second Album	
2007	CLARK	"Waiting in Line"		Our Best Second Album	
2007	CLARK	"Whatever"		Our Best Second Album	
2006	CLARK	"As We Speak"		Two of a Kind	
2006	CLARK	"Invisible"		Two of a Kind	
2006	CLARK	Easy Way Out"		Two of a Kind	
2006	CLARK	"You Make Me Love This World"		Two of a Kind	
2006	CLARK	"Be With You"		Two of a Kind	
2006	CLARK	"Nobody Else (But You)"		Two of a Kind	
2006	CLARK	"Make It Home"		Two of a Kind	
2006	CLARK	"I Don't Need You"	(6) Swedish Top 10 Singles, peak at No. 6, (2006)	Two of a Kind	
2006	CLARK	"Two of a Kind"		Two of a Kind	
2006	CLARK	"What if"		Two of a Kind	
2000	Three Studs & a Stone	"Monday Morning"		Ain't No Blues on My Radio	
2000	Three Studs & a Stone	"Miss Ellioth"		Ain't No Blues on My Radio	
2000	Three Studs & a Stone	"Rosedale Unset"		Ain't No Blues on My Radio	
2000	Three Studs & a Stone	"Ain't No Blues on My Radio"		Ain't No Blues on My Radio	
2000	Three Studs & a Stone	"Living Off the Ground"		Ain't No Blues on My Radio	
2000	Three Studs & a Stone	"Dying in My Sleep"		Ain't No Blues on My Radio	
