= Zombies on Broadway (album) =

Studio album by Andrew McMahon in the Wilderness
- Released: February 10, 2017
- Recorded: May–September 2016
- Studio: Studio America; Arcade; Play Beats; Infrasonic Sound
- Genre: Pop, pop rock
- Length: 38:19
- Label: Vanguard
- Producer: Various: Gregg Wattenberg; Derek Fuhrmann; Tommy English; Keith Jeffery; CJ Baran; Ben Romans; Jonny Coffer; Jake Sinclair; Robopop

Andrew McMahon in the Wilderness chronology
Andrew McMahon in the Wilderness (2014)	Zombies on Broadway (2017)	Upside Down Flowers (2018)

Singles from Zombies on Broadway
- 1. "Fire Escape" Released: September 9, 2016; 2. "Brooklyn, You're Killing Me" Released: November 18, 2016; 3. "Walking in My Sleep" Released: December 16, 2016; 4. "So Close" Released: January 6, 2017; 5. "Don't Speak for Me (True)" Released: January 27, 2017

Zombies on Broadway is the second studio album by American rock pianist Andrew McMahon, under the moniker Andrew McMahon in the Wilderness. During a break touring to support his self-titled debut album, McMahon wrote new material with Gregg Wattenberg and Derek Fuhrmann. He began recording the album between May and September 2016 with a variety of producers in Los Angeles, New York City, and London. Described as a pop and pop rock album, several reviewers compared its sound to the band Fun.

Preceded by the release of five singles—"Fire Escape" in September 2016, "Brooklyn, You're Killing Me" in November, "Walking in My Sleep" in December, "So Close" and "Don't Speak for Me (True)" in January 2017—Vanguard Records released Zombies on Broadway on February 10, 2017. It was met with a favorable reaction from music critics, many of whom commented on its melodies. Zombies on Broadway charted at number 43 on the US Billboard 200, and charted highly on the Alternative and Digital album charts. "Fire Escape" and "So Close" appeared on various Billboard charts. The album was promoted by the US Zombies in America tour, a UK tour, and supporting shows for Billy Joel.

== Background ==
Vocalist/pianist Andrew McMahon released his debut solo album, under the moniker Andrew McMahon in the Wilderness, in October 2014 through independent label Vanguard Records. His single, "Cecilia and the Satellite", was a top 10 hit on the Alternative Songs chart, and became one of the most played tracks of 2016. It performed well on adult album alternative and hot adult contemporary radio stations; "High Dive" had minor success on alternative stations. During time off from touring, McMahon was in New York City at the same time as two writers/producers he had wanted to work with for a while, Gregg Wattenberg and Derek Fuhrmann. In mid-2015, the trio held a writing session, coming up with the track "Fire Escape".

In August 2015, McMahon revealed had been writing a lot of material for his next album and attempting to build a strong group of songs that he could work on following the touring cycle. By December, he was halfway through the writing process for his next album. Later that month, and into January 2016, McMahon's band Jack's Mannequin reformed for an anniversary tour to support their debut album Everything in Transit (2005). By this time, McMahon had four or five unfinished songs for his next album. Following this, he spent February to April writing new material. Around this time, McMahon had been traveling around the country finding a place to record. After learning that a lot of New York-based writers/producers had migrated to Los Angeles, and having had a positive experience writing "Fire Escape", he relocated to New York City.

== Production ==
Recording lasted from May until September. In between sessions, McMahon supported Weezer and Panic! at the Disco on their headlining US tour. He also appeared at various festivals, and performed a series of headlining shows. Most of the album had been written and recorded in New York City in between tours. He was apprehensive about working there as it was where he was diagnosed with leukemia after working on Jack's Mannequin's Everything in Transit. He had planned to make the second Jack's Mannequin album in the city, but "wasn't really in a position of strength" and abandoned that idea. Eventually, he returned to the idea for Zombies on Broadway. He went to New York with a handful of songs and wrote several more before he started recording.

McMahon stayed in a Bedford apartment and took the subway to the recording studio in Times Square. The city's bars remained open until 4:00 am, which "got the best of [McMahon] him", and he subsequently returned home to California to continue working on the album. There McMahon wrote "Brooklyn, You're Killing Me" and "Island Radio", before he returned to New York and came up with five more new songs. McMahon hung out with former Jack's Mannequin's guitarist Bobby Anderson, who lived in the city. McMahon wanted to a guitar solo on one song and invited Anderson to a session. He subsequently tracked guitar for "Shot Out of a Cannon" and "Birthday Song".

Wattenberg and Fuhrmann served as the album's primary producers, while others produced handful of tracks. Tommy English produced "Brooklyn, You're Killing Me" with additional production from Keith Jeffery. CJ Baran, Ben Romans, Wattenberg and Fuhrmann co-produced "So Close". Jonny Coffer, Jake Sinclair, Wattenberg and Fuhrmann co-produced "Don't Speak for Me (True)". Robopop, Wattenberg and Fuhrmann produced "Fire Escape"; English produced "Island Radio".

"Brooklyn, You're Killing Me" and "Island Radio" were recorded at Studio America in Los Angeles, California, with English acting as engineer. "So Close", "Fire Escape", "Dead Man's Dollar", "Shot Out of a Cannon", "Walking in My Sleep", "Love and Great Buildings" and "Birthday Song" were recorded at Arcade Studios in New York City, with engineer Mike Adubato. "Don't Speak for Me (True)" was recorded at Arcade, Play Beats Studios in London, England, and Infrasonic Sound in Los Angeles, with engineers Jerome Williams and Suzy Shinn. John Sinclair mixed most of the recordings, except for "Brooklyn, You're Killing Me", "So Close" and "Fire Escape", which were mixed by Cladius Mittendorfer. Pete Lyman mastered the recordings at Infrasonic Mastering in Echo Park, California.

== Composition ==
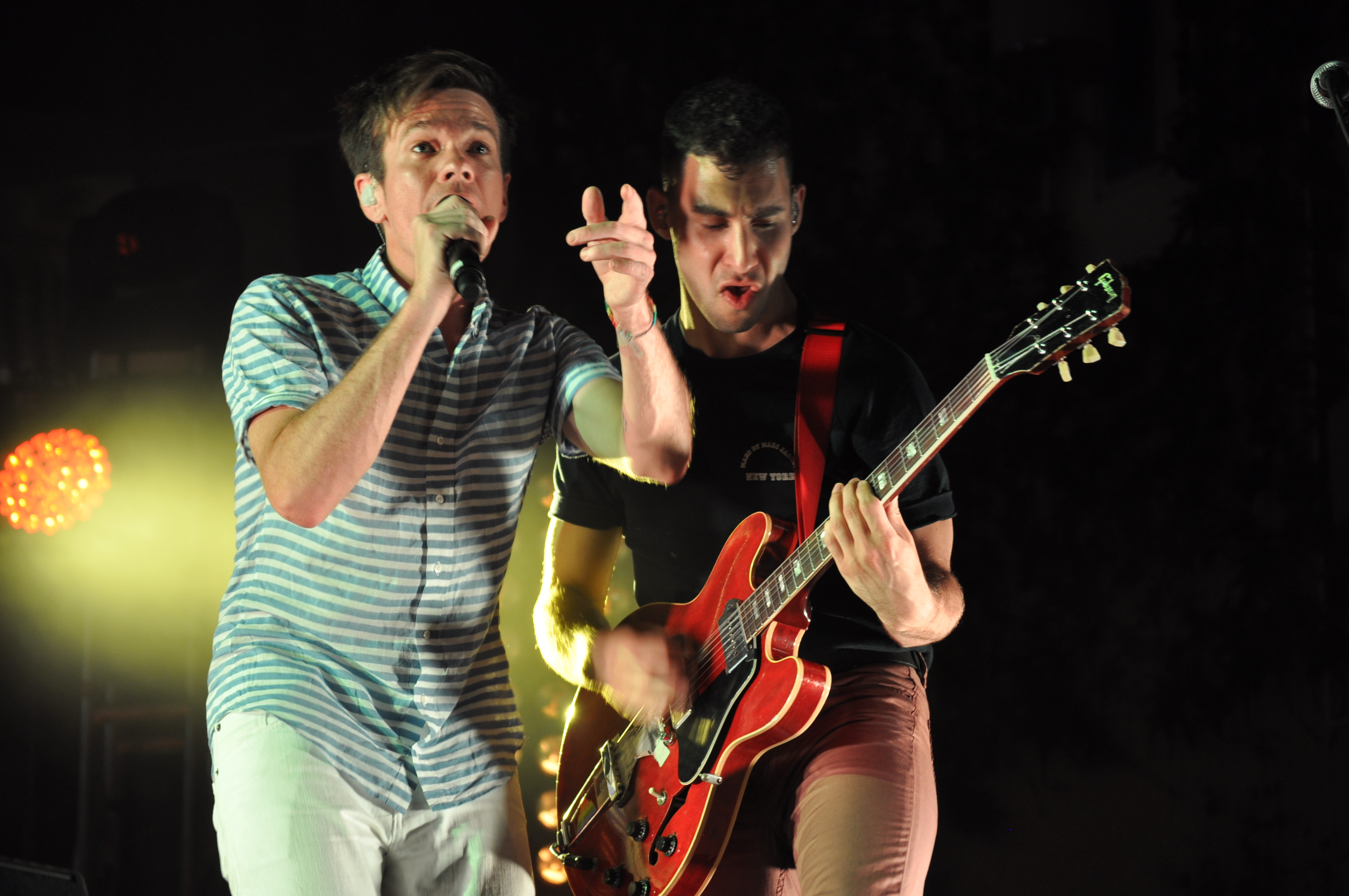
Zombies on Broadway drew comparison to Fun.

=== Overview ===
The title Zombies on Broadway comes from a lyric in a song that was not finished in time for inclusion on the album. Its meaning revolved around McMahon's train journey and walk to the studio, which was in a theater district. Leaving the studio at night, McMahon experienced a different atmosphere when he had to walk through the streets and get past the tourists. An underlying theme of the album was McMahon reconciling with his tendency to gravitate towards late nights and drinking heavily. Being in New York, this side of him came to the forefront, and subsequently he needed to get it under control. McMahon's goal for the album was to create the best songs possible, as opposed to trying to fit a song into a certain production style or aesthetic.

Musically, the album's sound has been described as pop and pop rock, with influences from electronic dance music; it drew comparisons to Fun. While in New York City, he spent many nights in festival tents listening to dance music, namely FKA Twigs, Lido, Sylvan Esso and Atlas Genius. This electronic influence can be heard in the dance-pop tracks "Brooklyn, You're Killing Me" and "Shot Out of a Cannon". According to McMahon, he "expanded the palette" for Zombies on Broadway "in a big way", retaining a lot of the "keyboard textures" on his debut album, and incorporating more guitar parts, a contrast to the first Wilderness album which did not feature any guitars. Discussing the running theme of space through the album, McMahon said "one half of me" has always been "in outer space and the other half on the ground".

=== Songs ===
"Zombie Intro" is a short 27-second long track that consists of city noise, passing trains and chatter from a New York subway. It transitions into "Brooklyn, You're Killing Me", which features spoken-word vocals and was reminiscent of the vibe heard on Everything in Transit (2005). It and "Island Radio" were written after McMahon had returned to Los Angeles as a "kind of my mic-drop about New York". "So Close" is about taking chances and starting over when the need arises; McMahon wrote it after the first Wilderness tour. "Don't Speak for Me (True)" is more stripped-down, compared to the preceding two tracks, with McMahon's vocals highlighting the lyrics.

While touring to support his debut album, McMahon had a weekend free from touring in New York. Here, he encountered "the acrobat, the banker, the oxblood friend; these larger than life characters ... that lead me through the boroughs, bodegas, bars and subway stations," which he referenced in "Fire Escape". The track has soft verses with strong chorus sections that incorporate chanting in the same vein as the band Walk the Moon. "Dead Man's Dollar", one of the first songs written for the album, talks about working long days to provide for one's family. It combines the lyric fragility of "Don't Speak for Me (True)" with the pop tendencies of "So Close" and "Fire Escape", starting with a quiet piano before eventually building by adding guitar and extra backing vocals.

"Shot Out of a Cannon" was written after being "outlaid crazy New York City at 4 a.m.". "Walking in My Sleep" began as a group of vignettes. McMahon explained: "I am someone who craves constant motion, but once plane rides and hotel nights accumulate there is a sense that the world has shifted in some imperceivable way." It is a piano-and-guitar centered track that features softer sections with McMahon's vocals on display. "Island Radio" uses unrequited love as a metaphor for being trapped on a deserted island. McMahon wrote "Love and Great Buildings" while looking at the architecture in Williamsburg, Brooklyn. The song alludes to politics, with its hints of the challenges people face during a recession. "Birthday Song" was the last song written for the album. McMahon woke up in his apartment and called his manager and told them he needed a piano immediately. He spent the afternoon staring out the window writing the song.

== Release ==
A lyric video was released for "Fire Escape" on September 8, and a day later as a single. Following this, he played at the Kaaboo festival. On September 26, a music video was released for the song. Directed by Jon Morris and Michael McQuilken, it features two inflatable dancers falling in love in different locations around Brooklyn. The Windmill Factory, which produced the clip, had previously worked on McMahon's stage visuals during performances. The inflatable dancers in the video were created for McMahon's tour with Weezer and Panic! at the Disco. McMahon wanted to show their personalities and come up with a love story between the two inflatables in the video. In October, McMahon supported Bastille at a one-off US show.

On November 10, Zombies on Broadway was announced for release, and the album's artwork was revealed. The cover contains two images of McMahon connected at the center of his face. In the first he is standing in front of a red backdrop; in the second he is wearing a space helmet with the backdrop of the New York City skyline behind him. McMahon's original idea for the cover was based around the album's seventh track "Shot Out of a Cannon" and would have featured a person being fired out of a cannon. Within an hour of booking the flight to this shoot, McMahon's superiors vetoed the idea. Ultimately, he and photographer Brendan Walter rented a studio and shot the final cover with a spacesuit. "Brooklyn, You're Killing Me" was released as a single on November 18. "Walking in My Sleep" was released as a single on December 16, followed by "So Close" on January 6, 2017. On January 23, McMahon performed "Fire Escape" on Jimmy Kimmel Live!. "Don't Speak for Me (True)" was released as a single on January 27, before the release of Zombies on Broadway on February 10 through independent label Vanguard Records. The Japanese edition, released on June 7, features the demos "Throwing Punches" and "Rich Kids with Summer Jobs" as bonus tracks.

Between mid-March and mid-May, McMahon went on the Zombies in America tour across the US with Atlas Genius and Night Riots. McMahon's backing band, dubbed In the Wilderness, consisted of Jack's Mannequin members Jay McMillian on drums and percussion, and Mikey "The Kid" Wagner on bass, guitar, keyboards, percussion and vocals, with Zac Clark on keyboards, vocals and percussion. On May 18, a music video for "So Close" premiered on Billboard's website. The clip sees McMahon performing as an astronaut-wannabe attempting to sell treats on the street. He then gets involved in a love affair with another astronaut-wannabe. Later that month, McMahon embarked on a brief UK tour. He supported Billy Joel for two shows in June and July.

== Reception ==
Professional ratings
Aggregate scores
Source	Rating
Metacritic	74/100
Review scores
Source	Rating
AllMusic	4/5 stars
Alternative Press	4/5 stars
The A.V. Club	C
The Breeze	5/5 stars
The Hoya	5/5 stars
Milwaukee Journal Sentinel	Favorable
Melodic	3/5 stars
Rolling Stone Australia	2/5 stars
Sputnikmusic	4.2/5
Substream Magazine	5/5 stars

Zombies on Broadway met with generally favorable reviews from music critics. At Metacritic, the album received an average score of 74, based on four reviews. The Breeze writer Alexis Miller noted that album fluctuated in tempo, "start[ing] off in a fast-paced frenzy, [and] end[ing] at a slower melody". The changing tempos were "well-balanced, making a steady descent from the energetic songs to the more melodic tunes". The Hoya's Rachel Linton said the album was "powered by McMahon’s strong sense of metaphor-based lyricism and catchy rhythms", showcasing his "increased musical ambition". Substream Magazine reviewer Jessica Klinner found it full of "gut-punching, tear-jerking lyrical content and catchy alt-pop melodies". saying writing that it "delivers hit after hit, showing that no matter what style of music McMahon writes, his signature voice always strikes a familiar chord."

Sputnikmusic staff member SowingSeason said it was McMahon's "first album since Everything In Transit that simply explodes with life and energy; whether it’s the enormous pop hooks, the dynamically interwoven verses, or the optimistic lyrics". Annie Zaleksi of Alternative Press said that "[n]ot only does the album overflow with stick-in-your-head hooks, but it also boasts contemporary production, from sleek digital programming to airy synthesizers, to go along with more traditional band-based instrumentation". AllMusic reviewer Stephen Thomas Erlewine wrote McMahon was "dedicated to carefully constructed melodies and earnest emotional blood-spilling". Despite the variety of pop styles, "its gleaming surface feels shinier than previous McMahon productions ... these inflections and accents feel like a culmination of craft".

Jon M. Gilbertson of the Milwaukee Journal Sentinel said "musical theater would suit his prodigious, unleashed energies ... 'Zombies on Broadway,' could be expanded into a pop musical". The A.V. Club's Chris Mincher said that while McMahon "fully throws himself at reminiscence and reflection", he "allows his seasoned songwriting to fall onto an adult-alternative treadmill of formulaic chord-plunking and bombastic choruses that's big on impact and short on invention". Melodic reviewer Johan Wippsson said it was full of "clever pop in a slightly electronic packaging", following "the same path [as the debut]". It "is a very safe delivery that shows that Andrew probably can write great pop songs in his sleep". He called it a "somewhat uneven album" with "some great tracks as well". Rolling Stone Australia reviewer Rod Yates said it "feels interchangeable with much of what's currently on pop radio, with McMahon's personality and soul smothered under a mass of shiny production techniques".

Zombies on Broadway charted at number 43 on the Billboard 200. It also charted on two additional component charts: number five on Alternative Albums, and number 12 on Digital Albums. Outside the US, it reached number 100 on the Australian Albums chart. "Fire Escape" reached number four on Alternative Airplay, number seven on Rock Airplay, and number 21 on Hot Rock & Alternative Songs. Outside of the US, it charted at number 37 on the Japan Hot 100. "So Close" reached number 23 on Alternative Airplay, number 39 on Rock Airplay, and number 40 on Hot Rock & Alternative Songs.

== Track listing ==
Credits per sleeve and booklet.

No.	Title	Writer(s)	Producer(s)	Length
1.	"Zombies Intro"		Gregg Wattenberg; Derek Fuhrmann	0:27
2.	"Brooklyn, You're Killing Me"	Andrew McMahon; Keith Jeffery	Tommy English; Jeffery	3:11
3.	"So Close"	McMahon; CJ Baran; Ben Romans	Baran; Romans; Wattenberg; Fuhrmann	3:19
4.	"Don't Speak for Me (True)"	McMahon; Ryan Beatty; Jake Sinclair; Jonny Coffer	Coffer; Sinclair; Wattenberg; Fuhrmann	3:24
5.	"Fire Escape"	McMahon; Daniel Omelio; Wattenberg; Fuhrmann	Robopop; Wattenberg; Fuhrmann	3:24
6.	"Dead Man's Dollar"	McMahon; Ivory Lane; Jimmy Robbins	Wattenberg; Fuhrmann	3:31
7.	"Shot Out of a Cannon"	McMahon; Fuhrmann; Wattenberg	Wattenberg; Fuhrmann	3:53
8.	"Walking in My Sleep"	McMahon; Daniel Nigro; Morgan Kibby	Wattenberg; Fuhrmann	3:50
9.	"Island Radio"	McMahon; Sinclair; Zac Clark	English	3:47
10.	"Love and Great Buildings"	McMahon	Wattenberg; Fuhrmann	3:48
11.	"Birthday Song"	McMahon	Wattenberg; Fuhrmann	5:39
Total length:				38:19

Japanese bonus tracks
No.	Title	Writer(s)	Producer(s)	Length
12.	"Throwing Punches" (Zombies demo)	McMahon; Robbins; Lane	McMahon; Robbins; Lane	3:53
13.	"Rich Kids with Summer Jobs" (Zombies demo)	McMahon; Robbins; Lane	McMahon; Robbins; Lane	2:58
Total length:				45:10

== Personnel ==
Personnel per sleeve and booklet.

Musicians

- Andrew McMahon – vocals, piano; keyboards (tracks 4 and 8–10), percussion (track 10), accordion (track 11)
- Tommy English – background vocals (tracks 2 and 9), drums (tracks 2 and 9), bass (track 2), guitars (tracks 2 and 9), programming (tracks 2 and 9), keyboards (track 9)
- Josh Moran – background vocals (track 2)
- CJ Baran – background vocals (track 3), programming (track 3)
- Todd Clark – background vocals (track 3)
- Jordan Miller – background vocals (tracks 3–6 and 8), guitars (track 3), programming (tracks 6 and 7)
- Jason Bell – background vocals (tracks 3, 6 and 8), programming (tracks 6 and 7)
- Gregg Wattenberg – guitars (tracks 3, 5, 6, 8, 10 and 11), programming (tracks 3, 5–8, 10 and 11), background vocals (tracks 5, 6 and 8), bass (tracks 7 and 11)
- Derek Fuhrmann – guitars (tracks 3, 5–8, 10 and 11), programming (tracks 3, 5–8, 10 and 11), background vocals (tracks 4–8), percussion (track 10)
- Mike Adubato – programming (track 3)
- Jake Sinclair – background vocals (track 4), bass (track 4), drums (track 4)
- Jonny Coffer – programming (track 4), keyboards (track 4), synthesizers (track 4)
- Robopop – background vocals (track 5), programming (track 5)
- John Alicastro – background vocals (track 5)
- Michael Lauri – background vocals (track 5)
- Ivory Lane – background vocals (tracks 6, 8 and 10)
- Carrie Brown – background vocals (tracks 6 and 8)
- Gillian Durkee – background vocals (track 6 and 8)
- Dana Wise – background vocals (track 6 and 8)
- Meredith Strang – background vocals (track 6 and 8)
- Gunnar Olsen – drums (tracks 6, 7 and 11)
- Bobby Anderson – guitars (tracks 7 and 11)
- Eric Hilfers – guitars (track 7)

Production

- Gregg Wattenberg – producer (all tracks except 2 and 9)
- Derek Fuhrmann – producer (all tracks except 2 and 9)
- CJ Baran – co-producer (track 3)
- Ben Romans – co-producer (track 3)
- Jonny Coffer – co-producer (track 4)
- Jake Sinclair – co-producer (track 4)
- Robopop – producer (track 5)
- Tommy English – producer (tracks 2 and 9), engineer (track 2 and 9)
- Keith Jeffery – additional production (track 2)
- John Sinclair – mixing (all tracks except 2, 3 and 5)
- Cladius Mittendorfer – mixing (tracks 2, 3 and 5)
- Pete Lyman – mastering
- Brendan Walter – art direction, photography, layout
- Jade Ehlers – additional photography
- Mike Adubato – engineer (tracks 3, 5–8, 10 and 11)
- Jerome Williams – engineer (track 4)
- Suzy Shinn – engineer (track 4)

== Charts ==
Chart (2017)	Peak position
Australian Albums (ARIA)	100
US Billboard 200	43
US Digital Albums (Billboard)	12
US Top Alternative Albums (Billboard)	5
