= Upside Down Flowers =

Studio album by Andrew McMahon in the Wilderness
- Released: November 16, 2018
- Genres: Pop rock, synth-pop
- Length: 43:23
- Label: Fantasy
- Producer: Butch Walker

Andrew McMahon in the Wilderness chronology
Zombies on Broadway (2017)	Upside Down Flowers (2018)	Tilt at the Wind No More (2023)

Singles from Upside Down Flowers
- 1. "Ohio" Released: May 11, 2018; 2. "Teenage Rockstars" Released: October 2, 2018; 3. "Blue Vacation" Released: October 19, 2018; 4. "Paper Rain" Released: November 9, 2018

Upside Down Flowers is the third studio album by American rock pianist Andrew McMahon, under the moniker Andrew McMahon in the Wilderness, released on November 16, 2018.

== Background and production ==
Vocalist/pianist Andrew McMahon released the second album under his Andrew McMahon in the Wilderness moniker, Zombies on Broadway, in February 2017. Its lead single "Fire Escape" became a top five charting-hit at alternative radio. He promoted it with tours of North America and Japan until Thanksgiving when he took his first long break in years. After renovating his Californian home, he had a studio area with his piano where he could write. He would often take his daughter to school and spend the rest of the day in his studio. He got into the groove of writing a new song every day and making voice memos of all of them. Though some of them lacked bridge sections; by Christmas he had nearly an album's worth of material. After showing his manager the material, McMahon contacted a friend of his, producer Butch Walker and asked if he wanted to work together. (Note: McMahon and Walker first met while they were working with Tommy Lee in 2005 on his Tommyland: The Ride album on which McMahon contributed piano and vocals.)

The following month, he went to Santa Monica and showed Walker the songs he had stockpiled and the pair went through them quickly. Unlike McMahon's previous two albums which featured multiple producers and co-writers, Upside Down Flowers was done solely with Walker, who McMahon had been wanting to work for those first two albums. Early on, the pair wanted the production to feel classic but modern at the same time. McMahon tracked piano and acceptable vocal takes; most of his time he spent waiting in the other room or return home and Walker was busy working on the songs. McMahon would come back the following day and work on Walker's edits and finish the songs from there. Walker played nearly every instrument on the album, including guitar, bass, drums, with the exception of keyboards. The string parts were arranged by Rob Mathes, and were recorded at Abbey Road Studios in London, UK. Tracking lasted for 20–30 days before the recordings were sent for mixing.

The name of the album may have been inspired by lyrics from a b-side called "Post Hawaii", which was released in September 2021, in McMahon's subscription-based fan club service, Camp Wilderness.

== Composition ==
Upside Down Flowers takes its name from a song that didn't end up on the album. McMahon explained that it was "in a way, a profile of the characters that I live with and the characters that I am." Musically, the album has been described as pop rock and synth-pop, consisting of vocal-and-piano-focused tracks with slow-to-mid tempo. It drew comparison to the Jack's Mannequin albums The Glass Passenger (2008) and People and Things (2011). A lot of McMahon's writing was influenced by the sound of the Beach Boys' Pet Sounds (1966), which he listened to over and over during the writing. With the release, McMahon retrospectively revisited his history of California and his fondness for the beach towns he grew up in.

"Teenage Rockstars" sees McMahon mulling over his early career while he attended high school while part of Something Corporate, and had a similar tone to "All the Young Dudes" by Mott the Hoople. He tried tackling the theme in a Jack's Mannequin song "Starting a Rock Band" but felt he lacked the perspective until now. "Ohio" was influenced by McMahon's early upbringing in Bexley, Ohio, and talks about revisiting the west coast. McMahon wrote "Blue Vacation" from a place of frustration with people "screaming into an echo chamber" and wanting to take a vacation from the news at the time. "Paper Rain" talks about spending life as a gamble. With "This Wild Ride", McMahon details his love for his grandmother, who died the same day he wrote it. "Goodnight, Rock and Roll" is a tribute to rock legends such as David Bowie and Tom Petty; "House in the Trees" sees McMahon outline his friendships and traveling.

== Release ==
In April and May 2018, McMahon went on an acoustic tour, dubbed The Pen and the Piano Tour. The shows served as a mix between VH1 Storytellers and Mister Rogers' Neighborhood where McMahon would tell stories about the songs he's performing, as well his backing band's members who performed their own solo songs. During this trek, "Ohio" was released as a single on May 11; a lyric video was released two days later. Following this, he co-headlined the Spring Fling festival. On October 2, Upside Down Flowers was announced for release, and "Teenage Rockstars" was released as a single. In addition, a music video was released for the track on the same day, directed by Jade Ehlers. Though there is clips of McMahon singing the song throughout the video, it predominately consists of footage of McMahon with his former band Something Corporate.

"Blue Vacation" premiered through PopMatters' website on October 18; a day later, it was released as a single. Following this, McMahon performed a handful of headlining and festival shows until the end of the year. On November 9, "Paper Rain" was released as a single; a music video was released for it on November 15, directed by Ehlers. Upside Down Flowers was released the following day through independent label Fantasy Records. McMahon supported the album with a three-month headlining US tour between January and March 2019, with support from Flor and Grizfolk. Following this, he played a few shows in Hawaii in June, and embarked on a solo tour in December. In May and June 2020, McMahon was due to embark on a co-headlining US tour with Awolnation.

== Reception ==
Professional ratings
Review scores
Source	Rating
Associated Press	Favorable
Sputnikmusic	3/5
The Stylus	Favorable

Upside Down Flowers received a positive response from music critics. Associated Press writer Pablo Gorondi wrote that it "stripp[ed] off a decade or three from [Zombies on Broadway]'s electronic sounds to create an intimacy that varies between translucent and supercharged." It had a "wide switchboard of emotions and McMahon the skill to expedite the connections." Vincent Croce of The Stylus found it to be a "very pop-centered and melodic album", acting as a "personal work that was executed with catchy choruses and beautiful melodies". Sputnikmusic staff member SowingSeason said the tracks "rel[ied] on [McMahon's] lyrics and emotional conviction to draw the listener in." He felt that "a lot of the energy has been sucked out of the room", and "every song plays a ballad, which means if you aren’t digging the lyrics or vibing with the particular emotion he’s putting on the table, you’re most likely bored."

Upside Down Flowers charted at number 169 on the Billboard 200. It also charted on three additional component charts: number 18 on Digital Albums, number 26 on Alternative Albums, and number 31 on Top Rock Albums. Upside Down Flowers was included on OC Weekly's list of the best 2018 SoCal albums.

== Track listing ==
1. "Teenage Rockstars" – 4:53
2. "Ohio" – 4:08
3. "Blue Vacation" – 3:57
4. "Monday Flowers" – 3:23
5. "Paper Rain" – 4:11
6. "This Wild Ride" – 3:39
7. "Goodnight, Rock and Roll" – 4:06
8. "House in the Trees" – 3:58
9. "Penelope" – 2:29
10. "Careless" – 3:51
11. "Everything Must Go" – 4:43

== Charts ==
Chart (2018)	Peak position
US Billboard 200	169
US Top Alternative Albums (Billboard)	26
US Digital Albums (Billboard)	18
US Top Rock Albums (Billboard)	31
