= After the Fire (disambiguation) =

After the Fire may refer to:

- After the Fire, a British rock band
- After the Fire (album), a 1988 album by British white power skinhead band Skrewdriver
- "After the Fire" (Modern Family), the eighth episode of the third season of the American sitcom Modern Family
- "After the Fire" (song), a 1985 song from the solo album Under a Raging Moon by Roger Daltrey
- "After the Fire", by Andrew McMahon in the Wilderness from The Pop Underground
- After the Fire, A Still Small Voice, a 2009 novel by English-Australian author Evie Wild
- After the Fire (novel), a book by Swedish author Henning Mankell
- After the Fire (2023 film), a French film directed by Mehdi Fikri
