= Tilt at the Wind No More =

Studio album by Andrew McMahon in the Wilderness
- Released: March 31, 2023
- Length: 39:07
- Label: Nettwerk Music Group
- Producers: Tommy English; Jeremy Hatcher

Andrew McMahon in the Wilderness chronology
Upside Down Flowers (2018)	Tilt at the Wind No More (2023)

Singles from Tilt at the Wind No More
- 1. "Stars" Released: August 18, 2022; 2. "Skywriting" Released: October 10, 2022; 3. "VHS" Released: November 16, 2022; 4. "Built to Last" Released: December 22, 2022; 5. "Lying on the Hood of Your Car" Released: January 11, 2023

Tilt at the Wind No More is the fourth studio album by American singer-songwriter and pianist Andrew McMahon under the moniker Andrew McMahon in the Wilderness. It was released on March 31, 2023, via Nettwerk Music Group.

== Background ==
In an interview with Alternative Press, McMahon stated that he was inspired "in an abstract way" to make the album in part due to fans' requests for deep cuts while performing virtual concerts during the COVID-19 pandemic while flashbacking to past events that led him to walk away from his previous projects Something Corporate and Jack's Mannequin.

== Promotion ==
The album has been supported by five singles. The song "Stars" was released on August 18, 2022, as the lead single. A second single, "Skywriting", was released on October 10, 2022. The third single, "VHS", was released on November 16, 2022. The fourth single, "Built to Last", was released on December 22, 2022, alongside a visualizer for it. The fifth single, "Lying on the Hood of Your Car", was released on January 11, 2023.

== Critical reception ==
Alli Patton of American Songwriter rated Tilt at the Wind No More three-and-a-half out of five stars and described the album's sound as "synth-riddled [and] hook-filled" and the lyrical content as "personal and introspective", and concluded her review by writing that the album "is a journey with plenty of ups, but also downs."

== Track listing ==
Tilt at the Wind No More track listing
No.	Title	Length
1.	"Lying on the Hood of Your Car"	3:33
2.	"Skywriting"	2:59
3.	"Stars"	4:30
4.	"Submarine"	3:21
5.	"Built to Last"	3:35
6.	"New Friends"	3:27
7.	"Little Disaster"	4:02
8.	"Last Rites"	3:12
9.	"VHS"	3:11
10.	"Nobody Tells You When You're Young"	3:45
11.	"Smoke & Ribbons"	3:32
Total length:		39:07
