= Cecilia and the Satellite =

Single by Andrew McMahon in the Wilderness

from the album Andrew McMahon in the Wilderness
- Released: August 12, 2014
- Recorded: 2013
- Genre: Pop rock • indie pop • synth-pop
- Length: 3:43
- Label: Vanguard
- Songwriter(s): James Flannigan; Anders Grahn; Andrew McMahon
- Producer(s): James Flannigan; Andrew McMahon; Mike Viola

Andrew McMahon in the Wilderness singles chronology
"Synesthesia" (2013)	"Cecilia and the Satellite" (2014)	"High Dive" (2015)

Music video
- "Cecilia and the Satellite" on YouTube

"Cecilia and the Satellite" is a song by Andrew McMahon in the Wilderness, written by James Flannigan, Anders Grahn, and Andrew McMahon. It released as the lead single from McMahon's self-titled debut album Andrew McMahon in the Wilderness on August 12, 2014. The song hit radio on August 19, 2014. It was written for his daughter, Cecilia.

== Music video ==
The official music video for the song, lasting three minutes and forty-three seconds, was uploaded on December 5, 2014, to McMahon's Vevo channel on YouTube. It was directed by Olivier Agostini. The video depicts Cecilia as a baby being shown a book by her father intercut with scenes showing a young woman, presumably Cecilia, walking and swimming in the locations depicted in the book. It is implied that the latter scenes are being imagined by the infant Cecilia.

== Chart performance ==
"Cecilia and the Satellite" was a commercial success, particularly in the US, becoming a top-ten hit on multiple genre-specific charts, and briefly charted on the all-format Billboard Hot 100.

=== Weekly charts ===
Weekly chart performance for "Cecilia and the Satellite"
Chart (2014−2015)	Peak position
US Billboard Hot 100	96
US Adult Pop Songs (Billboard)	10
US Alternative Songs (Billboard)	5
US Hot Rock Songs (Billboard)	6

=== Year-end charts ===
Year-end chart performance for "Cecilia and the Satellite"
Chart (2015)	Position
US Adult Alternative Songs	23
US Adult Top 40	35
US Alternative Songs	7
US Hot Rock Songs	13
US Rock Airplay Songs	7
US Rock Digital Songs	35

== Release history ==
Release history and formats for "Cecilia and the Satellite"
Region	Date	Label	Format
United States	August 12, 2014	Vanguard	Digital download
