= Synesthesia (song) =

2013 single by Andrew McMahon

Single by Andrew McMahon

from the album The Pop Underground
- B-side: "Sister Golden Hair"
- Released: April 2, 2013
- Recorded: 2013
- Genre: Synthpop, electronic, indie rock
- Length: 4:21
- Label: Left Here Music
- Songwriters: Andrew McMahon, Mark Williams
- Producer: Tony Hoffer

Audio sample
- file; help

"Synesthesia" is a song and the debut single from Andrew McMahon's debut solo EP The Pop Underground, released on April 2, 2013, as a digital download and first physically available in the deluxe preorder package of The Pop Underground as a 7" picture disc. The single marks McMahon's first single release separated from his prior bands Something Corporate and Jack's Mannequin, as well as his commissioned writing for Smash, and also his first single as an independent artist. The single is produced and mixed by Tony Hoffer and written by McMahon and Mark Williams.

Musically, the song is a new direction for McMahon, who embraced a more electronic, synthpop sound on The Pop Underground. Lyrically, the song documents various autobiographical aspects in McMahon's life at the time of the song's writing. An accompanying music video was directed by brother duo Hamilton and Cooper Karl in Claremont, California. It was released on McMahon's VEVO page on June 13, 2013.

== Track listing ==
1. Side A: Synesthesia - 4:21
2. Side B: Sister Golden Hair (America cover) - 3:26

== Composition ==
Synesthesia is written in the key of C-sharp with a tempo of 110 beats per minute. Regarding composition, it is a notable departure, as is the case with The Pop Underground, from McMahon's earlier work with Jack's Mannequin and Something Corporate, which were grounded in more traditional piano rock, in favour of a more electronic sound, incorporating synthesizers and electronic drums to supplement the underlying organic arrangement.

The song's lyrics illustrate various snapshots of McMahon's life when writing Synesthesia in January, 2013, such as fun.'s various awards associated with their sophomore album, Some Nights, McMahon's own inability, at the time of writing, to obtain a Gold record, a feat achieved in later in May, 2013, by Dark Blue. McMahon also mentioned in an interview with Infectious Magazine that the line "sometimes we're only flying for a while" was inspired by his training for his private pilot license.

== Release and Reception ==
The live version of Synesthesia was originally premiered by McMahon on March 13, 2013, during the first show of his first solo headlining run. The studio version was first available for streaming by Under The Gun Review on March 31, 2013. It was officially released on April 2, 2013, as a digital download, and was also available as an instant download when preordering McMahon's solo EP, The Pop Underground. The song was noted by reviewers as a vast departure from McMahon's previous work, though was mentioned to be one of the more personal, reflective songs from his catalogue.

Synesthesia's physical release is notable for being available exclusively on 7" picture disc vinyl. Originally, the disc was an exclusive part of the deluxe preorder package for The Pop Underground, but was later made available separately.

== Music video ==
The music video, directed by McMahon's cousins and brother duo Hamilton and Cooper Karl, was filmed in Claremont, California. On the day of its release, McMahon wrote a blog on his website explaining that in his career creating music videos has never been his favorite task when it comes to releasing music and trusted the creative vision of his cousins after telling them he wanted it to be a celebratory video and cited the album artwork of The Pop Underground as inspiration. The first part of the music video was filmed April 26, 2013 in Claremont in the backyard of a house owned by the Karl brother's friend and McMahon's portion was later filmed on May 9, 2013, in Cooper Karl's apartment against a white wall with a projection screen casting video over him. Between the clips of McMahon singing, the video follows a man and woman finding each other in the backyard and meeting up with their friends, and having a good time jumping into a swimming pool filled with inflatable animals and later on playfully attacking each other with powdered color bombs. The video was released on McMahon's VEVO page on June 13, 2013.

== Personnel ==
=== Synesthesia ===
- Lyrics - Andrew McMahon and Mark Williams
- Vocals, Piano – Andrew McMahon
- Keys, Programming, Guitar, Pre-Production and Arrangement - Mark Williams
- Drums – Jay McMillan
- Programming, Production, Mixing and Recording: Tony Hoffer
- Additional Guitar – Jeremy Hatcher

=== Sister Golden Hair ===
- Lyrics - Gerry Beckley
- Vocals, Piano – Andrew McMahon
- Bass, Vocals, Production and Recording – Jim Wirt
- Drums – John Richey
- Mixing – "Noah Mailbox" Passovoy

== Trivia ==
- The Sister Golden Hair B-Side is marketed and marked, on disc, as "Sister Golden Hair Surprise".
- Synesthesia was recorded at Sound Factory Studio B and The Hobby Shop in Los Angeles, CA.
- Sister Golden Hair was recorded at Crushstone Studios in Cleveland, OH.
