= The Pop Underground =

EP by Andrew McMahon
- Released: April 30, 2013
- Recorded: 2012–2013
- Genre: Pop; electronic
- Length: 15:05
- Label: Left Here Music
- Producer: Tony Hoffer

Andrew McMahon chronology
The Pop Underground (2013)	Andrew McMahon in the Wilderness (2014)

Singles from The Pop Underground
- 1. "Synesthesia" Released: April 2, 2013

The Pop Underground is an EP by Andrew McMahon, marking his first official debut as a solo artist separated from his prior bands Something Corporate and Jack's Mannequin. It is produced and mixed by Tony Hoffer. It was released on April 30, 2013. The EP received a mainly positive response from music critics, with reviewers praising the release for its upbeat, poppy sound.

== Background and production ==
People and Things, the third Jack's Mannequin record, was released in October 2011. Frontman Andrew McMahon considered it the final part of the Jack's Mannequin story that was initially meant to only last for a single album. By November, he said the Jack's Mannequin name wasn't "useful" to him after the album's release. He added that it might be the appropriate time for him to leave the name behind and start a new project around modern music. In February 2012, McMahon started dropping suggestions that the band would break up. In September, "Wrecking Ball Heart" was posted online, a track that McMahon viewed as both the final Jack's Mannequin song and his first solo song. Jack's Mannequin played their last show in November. Following this, McMahon spent the next few months in studios doing pop writing and writing songs for the TV show Smash. After this, he worked on songs for a solo EP.

McMahon collaborated with producer Mark Williams, who wrote songs with beats and programming. McMahon came up with lyrics in a stream-of-conscientiousness manner, drafting up piano tracks and melodies. Before working with Williams, McMahon had completed a two-day writing session for a different musician, and subsequently went out to celebrate. He spent half of his first day with Williams hungover, having little progress working with an existing song McMahon had brought in. Williams proposed starting a new song and began working on a beat. McMahon said it "brought [him] out of [his] fog", tracking piano and writing lyrics; the track became "Learn to Dance". It defined the EP's subject matter, in addition to McMahon and Williams' approach in the studio.

The Pop Underground was recorded by Tony Hoffer at The Hobby Shop in Highland Park and Sound Factory Studio B in Hollywood, with additional recording done by Mark Williams in his studio from late 2012 to early 2013. "Sister Golden Hair Surprise" was recorded by Jim Wirt at Crushstone Studios, Cleveland, Ohio.

== Composition ==
The EP's title first appeared in a post McMahon wrote for the Huffington Post, in which he speaks of his accomplishments as an artist under the radar: "...night after night and album after album, a mass of humanity I now refer to lovingly as the pop underground, come together and sing. ... [W]e are a scrappy tribe and we stand for something: Music that is found, shared and cared for[; …] music that tells a story that people want to retell." All of the songs on the EP were co-written by McMahon and Williams, with Williams taking part in pre-production and arrangement. The songs feature a mixture of electronic and organic instruments with live and programmed drums. Musically, the EP has been classed as pop and electronic. McMahon was inspired by Miike Snow, Niki & the Dove, My Morning Jacket, Andrew Bird and Atlas Genius. McMahon said he wanted the songs to tackle serious topics while at the same time have an feel-good vibe to it. Thematically, the songs reference McMahon's upbringing with his family, places he's visited, and forgiveness.

"Synesthesia" talks about McMahon having a quiet career as a musician, and him being proud of his achievements. With "Catching Cold", McMahon and Williams spent 10 hours in the studio looking for inspiration. McMahon received a phone call from one of his friends, which gave him flashbacks from his earlier days growing up in Ohio. Upon his return to the studio, the pair came up with an outline of the song; McMahon showed it to Hoffner, who added programming and synthesizers. It had elements of electro music, and saw McMahon use Auto-Tune during the bridge section. A line of its lyrics reference the time his sister become his donor for his stem cell transplant. "Lean to Dance" is about learning from the past and finding forgiveness. "After the Fire" showcases McMahon's piano playing ability, and was inspired by One Flew Over the Cuckoo's Nest (1975). It discusses stasis and the need to push through negativity.

== Release ==
The EP was intended for release in February 2013, however, he ended up receiving a support slot offer from Fun in December 2012. McMahon, who had helped Fun in their early days touring with Jack's Mannequin, accepted their offer. He didn't plan to gather a backing band until February, but managed to get some of his friends around Christmas 2012 and spent a week learning around 20 songs. The backing band consisted of six people, including two former members of Jack's Mannequin. In January and February 2013, McMahon performed a handful of solo dates and supported Fun. McMahon cancelled some of his dates supporting Fun due to a family emergency. He then went on headlining tour in March, which continued into April. The shows featured a mix of Something Corporate, Jack's Mannequin and new material. "Synesthesia" was released as a single on April 2, 2013.

On April 25, Billboard premiered "After the Fire" on their website. On April 26, AOL premiered "Learn to Dance" on their blog. Lastly, on April 29, Alternative Press premiered "Catching Cold". The Pop Underground was released on April 30 through Left Here Music. Discussing the quick turnover between Jack's Mannequin ending and the release of the EP, McMahon said he wanted to remove the "structure around [him that] was sort of stifling my ability to release" material in a timely manner, referring to major labels. Some physical editions offered a 7" vinyl single which featured an alternative version of "Synesthesia" and a cover of "Sister Golden Hair Surprise" by America. McMahon performed at the Slam Dunk Festival in the UK at the end of May. On June 13, a music video was released for "Synesthesia", directed by Hamilton & Cooper Karl. Between June and August, McMahon supported O.A.R. on their headlining US tour.

== Reception ==
Professional ratings
Review scores
Source	Rating
AllMusic	Favorable
Diffuser.fm	6/10
Melodic	3/5 stars
Rock Sound	7/10
The Stylus	3.5/5 stars

The EP itself has received mainly positive reviews from music critics. AllMusic reviewer Gregory Heaney found it akin to "a more grounded and restrained" version of Jónsi, the frontman for Sigur Rós. He complimented the "lush" electronic backing tracks, which gave the tracks "a warm, flowing feeling." Overall, Heaney called it a "fitting way" for McMahon's reinvention. Max Barrett of Rock Sound said McMahon "return[ed] in fine form" on the release, praising his voice for sustaining "the same tones" that made him stand out. The EP had upbeat energy and "a certain swagger" to it which made it "sweet, essential summer listening."

Melodic reviewer John Wippsson said McMahon provided "cute and catchy pop in a luxurious format." He felt he shift to an electronic-based style, which worked well, came across as "a little too simple and synthetic." While The Stylus' Brandon Wood lauded the songs "unique" musicality, he found them lacking in lyrical quality, save for "After the Fire". He wished McMahon's future endeavours would have "more of his personal style of musical genius." Though Diffuser.fm writer Beth Kellmurray enjoyed "Synesthesia", she said the "synth and auto-tuning" come across "as crutches" for McMahon, becoming a "distraction" for the rest of the tracks.

== Track listing ==
All tracks are written by Andrew McMahon and Mark Williams, except where noted.

Standard edition
No.	Title	Length
1.	"Synesthesia"	4:21
2.	"Catching Cold"	4:01
3.	"Learn to Dance"	3:17
4.	"After the Fire"	3:26

Digital deluxe edition/"Synesthesia" 7" bonus track
No.	Title	Writer(s)	Length
5.	"Sister Golden Hair Surprise" (America cover)	Gerry Beckley	3:26

== Personnel ==
- Lyrics - Andrew McMahon and Mark Williams
- Keys on "Catching Cold", Vocals and Piano - Andrew McMahon
- Pre-production, Arrangement, Keys, Programming and Guitar - Mark Williams
- Drums - Jay McMillan
- Additional Guitar on "Catching Cold", Programming, Production and Mixing - Tony Hoffer
- Additional Guitar on "Synesthesia" and "Catching Cold", Guitar on "Learn To Dance" - Jeremy Hatcher
- Bass on "Learn to Dance" and "Synesthesia" - Mike Wagner
- Art Direction and Design - Frank Maddocks
