= Andrew McMahon in the Wilderness (album) =

2014 album by Andrew McMahon

Studio album by Andrew McMahon in the Wilderness
- Released: October 14, 2014
- Recorded: December 2013–April 2014
- Studios: Barebones; Big Evil; Rusk; LAFX; Spendlove; Gat 3; Limbo
- Genres: Pop; soft rock; electronic
- Length: 37:11
- Label: Vanguard
- Producers: Mike Viola; James Flannigan; Andrew McMahon; Zac Clark; Jay McMillan

Andrew McMahon in the Wilderness chronology
The Pop Underground (2013)	Andrew McMahon in the Wilderness (2014)	Zombies on Broadway (2017)

Singles from Andrew McMahon in the Wilderness
- 1. "Cecilia and the Satellite" Released: August 12, 2014; 2. "High Dive" Released: September 2, 2014; 3. "Canyon Moon" Released: September 23, 2014; 4. "See Her on the Weekend" Released: September 30, 2014

Andrew McMahon in the Wilderness is the debut studio album by American rock pianist Andrew McMahon, under the moniker Andrew McMahon in the Wilderness. Following the demise of Jack's Mannequin, McMahon released The Pop Underground (2013) EP. He began recording an album between late 2013 and early 2014 at various studios in Los Angeles, California, with producers Mike Viola and James Flannigan. Described as a pop, soft rock and electronic album, it drew comparisons to Fun, the Killers and Passion Pit. Half of the material on the album was co-written with Viola, while the balance was co-written with various musicians.

Preceded by four singles, "Cecilia and the Satellite" in August, "High Dive", "Canyon Moon" and "See Her on the Weekend" in September, Vanguard Records released Andrew McMahon in the Wilderness on October 14, 2014. It was met with a favorable reaction from music critics, many of whom found it an enjoyable listen. Tours of the US and Australia, and music videos for "Cecilia and the Satellite" and "High Dive" helped to promote the album. It charted at number 21 on the US Billboard 200, as well as reaching upper positions on the Alternative, Digital and Independent album charts. "Cecilia and the Satellite" and "High Dive" appeared on various Billboard charts.

== Background ==
Jack's Mannequin released their third album People and Things in October 2011 through the Warner Bros. imprint Sire Records. The album was made between 2009 and 2011, during which there was a leadership change at Warner Bros. As a result, the album was recorded on three separate occasions. Throughout the making of the album, vocalist/pianist Andrew McMahon felt that it was time to move on to another project. He considered the album the final part of the Jack's Mannequin story that he had initially intended would last for only one record. In February 2012, McMahon began dropping suggestions that the band's breakup was imminent. McMahon soon ended his partnership with Warner Bros. because of creative differences, and left his management. He took a step back from the music industry, moved out of Los Angeles to San Clemente, and spent his time focusing on his marriage, mental health and confidence.

In September, "Wrecking Ball Heart", a track that McMahon viewed as both the final Jack's Mannequin song and his first solo song, was posted online. Jack's Mannequin played their last show in November. McMahon spent the next few months in studios writing pop songs and writing songs for the TV show Smash. After this, he worked on songs for a solo EP; The Pop Underground EP was released in April 2013. McMahon then earned a support slot for O.A.R. on their headlining US tour between June and August. Around this time, McMahon received an Emmy nomination for Smash and found new management. They suggested he take time off from touring to work on new songs. Following this, he stayed alone in a cabin in Topanga Canyon, near Los Angeles, California, in August. He spent the weekdays writing for his debut solo album, and the weekends at home with his pregnant wife. He worked 10 hours per day, sat at his piano, and wrote batches of songs every week. Collectively, he spent two months at the cabin.

== Production ==
Following his time in Topanga Canyon, McMahon began working with producer Mike Viola in his Echo Park garage studio. McMahon took what he enjoyed while making the EP, namely the concept of going into a studio and working on something in a timely manner and applied it to the album's sessions. In December 2013, McMahon and Viola came up with a demo of "High Dive". It featured a piano, programmed drums and guitar; after muting the guitar track, the pair were surprised at the clarity of the piano against the rest of the recording. They realized they could work around the production without needing to have too many layers to focus on. This subsequently became the production template for the rest of the album. A friend of McMahon's liked the work of songwriter James Flannigan and suggested that McMahon work with him. The two of them with Flannigan's writing partner, Anders Grahn, collaborated on songs in Hollywood.

After an impressive session, Flannigan was invited to help complete the album with McMahon and Viola. When the trio met for the first time, McMahon cautioned them he might have to leave at a moment's notice as his wife was due to give birth any day. His daughter Cecilia was born in February 2014; despite this, sessions continued into April. McMahon and his manager contacted Vanguard Records (who McMahon knew through friends) after more than half the album had been recorded and began working with them. McMahon, Flannigan and Viola worked in a variety of production areas at studios in Los Angeles to finish the album. They included: Barebones Studios, Big Evil, Rusk Studios, LAFX (with engineer Spencer Guerra), Spendlove Studios and Limbo Studios in the UK.

McMahon sang, he and Flannigan played keyboards, and Viola added bass. Viola and Flannigan sang backing vocals; Viola added guitar on "Black and White Movies". Flannigan contributed programming, with additional programming by Viola and Jake Sinclair, who provided additional production. Patrick Warren came up with string arrangements for "High Dive and "Rainy Girl"; McMahon self-produced the latter song at Gat 3 with engineer Glenn A. Tabor III. Zac Clark (who added programming, keyboards and tambourine) and Jay McMillan (who added programming, drums and percussion) co-produced "See Her on the Weekend". Sinclair mixed the final recordings at Infrasonic Sound, before Pete Lyman mastered them there.

== Composition ==
=== Overview ===
Musically, critics have described the sound of Andrew McMahon in the Wilderness as pop, soft rock and electronic, incorporating the classic rock and Americana elements of the Jack's Mannequin albums The Glass Passenger (2008) and People and Things. It earned comparisons to Fun, the Killers and Passion Pit. Similar to The Pop Underground, McMahon wanted to merge contemporary instrumentation, such as synthesizers and programming, with classic instrumentation, like piano, bass and drums. He purposefully did not want any guitar, which helped him to establish his own sound. While working on the album, McMahon said Daft Punk, LCD Soundsystem, M83 and Passion Pit influenced him.

The album's title refers to McMahon being out of the major label system and without a band and his subsequent attempts to find his way back. The album discusses where McMahon was in his life at the time, and tackles some themes from Jack's Mannequin's Everything in Transit (2005), namely returning to southern California and starting a new life and the new topics of reflection and parenthood. McMahon wrote some material from a Sliding Doors-esque (1981) perspective and asked himself: "What would have come next if I hadn’t encountered that bizarre chapter of my disrupted 20s?" McMahon co-wrote half of the album's material with Viola, while the balance was self-written ("Rainy Girl") or co-written with Sam Hollander, Kevin Griffin of Better Than Ezra, Flannigan, Grahn, Andrew Goldstein and Brian Lee.

=== Tracks ===
McMahon co-wrote "Canyon Moon" in four hours with Griffin (whom McMahon had known since the early days of touring with Something Corporate) and Hollander. The trio made a demo of the track and forgot about it until McMahon listened to it later and re-wrote parts of it. Though McMahon said the song is not about him directly, it talks about a person leaving Los Angeles as he had after disbanding Jack's Mannequin. "Cecilia and the Satellite" was written knowing he and his wife were expecting their first child. It was one of the last songs written for the album, and summarizes McMahon's life up to that point. It incorporates group vocals in the vein of Bastille. While on the way to a studio, McMahon heard Don Henley's "The Boys of Summer" and wanted to pick apart its anatomy with Viola. After noticing how vivid the song's lyrics were, they began writing "High Dive". McMahon tackled it from the viewpoint of splitting up with his wife and her moving on, saying it was about loving a person "so much that you'll take anything they're willing to give even if it's not enough". McMahon's weekend trips to see his wife inspired the creation of "See Her on the Weekend". It talks about long-distance love and occupying time until Friday.

"Black and White Movies" was one of the earliest songs McMahon wrote with Viola in his garage; he saw it as an "answer" to the work he had done with Jack's Mannequin: Everything in Transit "was all about summer and California", whereas "Black and White Movies" was "after the tourists left and the beach houses get shut down". "Driving Through a Dream" began as a psychedelic piece before McMahon reined it in and wrote about an urge to escape life and drive in a desert. The intro was compared to the beginning of People and Things track "Television". "Halls" was written about a specific moment during the first Jack's Mannequin tour while on a stop in Arizona. He had broken up with his girlfriend and attempted to reconnect. One critic viewed it as a dance-able version of People and Things song "Amy, I". "Rainy Girl", alongside "See Her on the Weekend", were some of the earliest songs written during McMahon's stay in Topanga. It talks about his enthusiasm over meeting his child. "Maps for the Getaway" is about going for broke, and borrows the melody from the Everything in Transit track "Rescued". The synthesizer channels the melody of "Edge of Seventeen" (1982) by Stevie Nicks.

== Release ==
In July, McMahon began performing under the moniker Andrew McMahon in the Wilderness. He explained that the wilderness part of the name was "mostly an abstract one. Since putting Jack’s [Mannequin] behind me, I have forced myself into strange spaces seeking new stimulus." The name was taken from a journal that McMahon had started after moving out of Los Angeles titled In the Wilderness. His live band consisted of McMillan on drums, Mikey Wagner on bass and keyboards, and Clark on keyboards. Later that month, he played a few headlining shows with support from My Body Sings Electric and Wild Party. "Cecilia and the Satellite" was made available for streaming on July 18 via McMahon's SoundCloud profile. McMahon then supported Gavin DeGraw and Matt Nathanson on their co-headlining US tour in July and August.

On August 12, Andrew McMahon in the Wilderness was announced for release in October, the album's artwork was revealed, and "Cecilia and the Satellite" was released as a single. "High Dive" was released as a single on September 2, as was "Canyon Moon" on September 23. "See Her on the Weekend" was made available for streaming through MTV on September 29, before being released as a single the following day. Andrew McMahon in the Wilderness was made available for streaming on October 6 through Billboard's website, before being released on October 14 through independent label Vanguard Records. McMahon then went on a headlining US tour in October and November. On December 5, a music video was released for "Cecilia and the Satellite", directed by Olivier Agostini.

This was followed by a "Day in the Life" video on February 25, 2015, again directed by Agostini. This version features McMahon, his wife and his daughter spending time together while on tour, before they watch him perform at a show. In August, McMahon embarked on an Australian tour. McMahon performed "Cecilia and the Satellite" on Conan on September 29, and again for Today on October 2. "High Dive" was released to alternative radio stations on October 13. The Canyons EP was released on November 20, and featured stripped-down versions of "Maps for the Getaway", "Cecilia and the Satellite", "Halls" and "High Dive", produced by John Alagia. On December 7, a music video was released for "High Dive", directed by Rich Ragsdale. In February 2016, McMahon performed on KROQ-FM's Red Bull Sound Space, playing "High Dive" and "Cecilia and the Satellite". A Grey Goon remix of "High Dive" was released in April.

== Reception ==
Professional ratings
Aggregate scores
Source	Rating
Metacritic	78/100
Review scores
Source	Rating
AbsolutePunk	8.5/10
AllMusic	3.5/5 stars
The AU Review	8/10
Daily Bulletin	Favorable
Melodic	4/5 stars
The Music	3/5 stars
PopMatters	6/10 stars
Sputnikmusic	3/5

Andrew McMahon in the Wilderness was met with generally favorable reviews from music critics. At Metacritic, the album received an average score of 78, based on four reviews. AbsolutePunk staff member Craig Manning said that while McMahon "retreads melodies he’s used before on more than one occasion", there was no instance "when the familiarity of the proceedings detracts from the overall enjoyment of the record". He saw it as McMahon's "most consistent front-to-back set of songs" since Everything in Transit. Melodic writer Johan Wippsson wrote that per "usual, you get the piano-based pop with luxurious and very catchy melodies", adding that with the "slightly more electronic sound", he "takes the album to an extraordinary level". Ruby Niemann of The AU Review found the production to be "glossier and more radio-friendly, which sometimes removes a lot of the intensity and emotional awkwardness that was so enjoyable about McMahon's earlier projects". The reviewer felt he can "still write a hook" noting that "when McMahon tries to write a good pop song, he really does it".

AllMusic reviewer James Christopher Monger said McMahon "taps into his more commercial sensibilities", creating "pop confections that are as effortlessly breezy and melodic as they are steeped in carefully constructed melodrama". PopMatters' Colin McGuire said it was "drenched with so much of 1980s soft rock", helped by "warm, heavy synths and a gaggle of steady electronic kick drums". The Music writer Charmaine de Souza said McMahon's "piano mastery is in full-force throughout" the record, "perfectly complementing his brand of delicately phrased pop that’s introspective with just the right amount of naivety". He described it as a "promising debut" that was "laden with back-to-back radio-ready tracks." Sputnikmusic staff member SowingSeason saw it as "bursting at the seams with energetic melodies, enormous hooks, and optimistic lyrical topics." There was a "sense of rejuvenation, and it shows in everything from the jubilant piano notes to McMahon’s excited vocal delivery".

Andrew McMahon in the Wilderness charted at number 21 on the US Billboard 200. It also reached number three on Independent Albums, number four on Alternative Albums, and number 11 on the Digital Albums charts. "Canyon Moon" charted at number 41 on Rock Digital Song Sales. "Cecilia and the Satellite" reached number 96 on the Hot 100, in addition to number four on Rock Airplay, number five on Alternative Airplay, number six on Alternative Digital Song Sales and Hot Rock & Alternative Songs, number seven on Triple A Songs, number 10 on Adult Top 40, and number 24 on Adult Contemporary charts. "High Dive" charted at number 16 on the Alternative Airplay, and number 24 on the Rock Airplay charts.

== Track listing ==
Writing credits per booklet.

Andrew McMahon in the Wilderness standard edition
No.	Title	Writer(s)	Producer	Length
1.	"Canyon Moon"	Andrew McMahon; Sam Hollander; Kevin Griffin	Mike Viola; James Flannigan; McMahon	3:03
2.	"Cecilia and the Satellite"	McMahon; James Flannigan; Anders Grahn	Viola; Flannigan; McMahon	3:43
3.	"High Dive"	McMahon; Mike Viola	Viola; Flannigan; McMahon	3:47
4.	"All Our Lives"	McMahon; Andrew Goldstein; Brian Lee	Viola; Flannigan; McMahon	3:50
5.	"See Her on the Weekend"	McMahon	Viola; Flannigan; McMahon; Zac Clark (co.); Jay McMillan (co.)	3:49
6.	"Black and White Movies"	McMahon; Viola	Viola; Flannigan; McMahon	4:04
7.	"Driving Through a Dream"	McMahon; Viola	Viola; Flannigan; McMahon	4:11
8.	"Halls"	McMahon; Viola	Viola; Flannigan; McMahon	3:48
9.	"Rainy Girl"	McMahon; Viola	McMahon	2:59
10.	"Maps for the Getaway"	McMahon; Viola; Flannigan	Viola; Flannigan; McMahon	3:57
Total length:				37:11

Japanese bonus tracks
No.	Title	Length
11.	"Lottery Ticket"	3:17
12.	"Art School Girlfriend"	3:53
13.	"Shelter Breaks"	3:54
14.	"High Dive" (acoustic)	4:02
Total length:		52:22

Deluxe edition bonus tracks
No.	Title	Length
11.	"Lottery Ticket"	3:17
12.	"Art School Girlfriend"	3:53
13.	"Maps for the Getaway" (Canyons version)	3:57
14.	"Cecilia and the Satellite" (Canyons version)	4:02
15.	"Halls" (Canyons version)	3:47
16.	"High Dive" (Canyons version)	4:10
Total length:		60:23

== Personnel ==
Personnel per booklet.

Musicians

- Andrew McMahon – piano, vocals, keyboards
- James Flannigan – programming, keyboards, backing vocals
- Mike Viola – additional programming, bass, backing vocals; guitar (track 6)
- Jake Sinclair – additional programming
- Patrick Warren – string arrangement (tracks 3 and 9)
- Zac Clark – programming, keyboards, tambourine (track 5)
- Jay McMillan – programming, drums, percussion (track 5)

Production

- Mike Viola – producer, engineer
- James Flannigan – producer, engineer
- Andrew McMahon – producer (track 9)
- Jake Sinclair – additional production, mixing
- Zac Clark – co-producer (track 5)
- Jay McMillan – co-producer (track 5)
- Spencer Guerra – engineer
- Glenn A. Tabor III – engineer
- Pete Lyman – mastering
- Jimmy Marble – photography
- Brendan Walter – Andrew McMahon photo
- Carrie Smith – layout

== Chart performance ==
Chart performance for Andrew McMahon in the Wilderness
Chart (2014)	Peak position
US Billboard 200	21
US Digital Albums (Billboard)	11
US Independent Albums (Billboard)	3
US Top Alternative Albums (Billboard)	4
