= Flor (band) =

American indie rock band

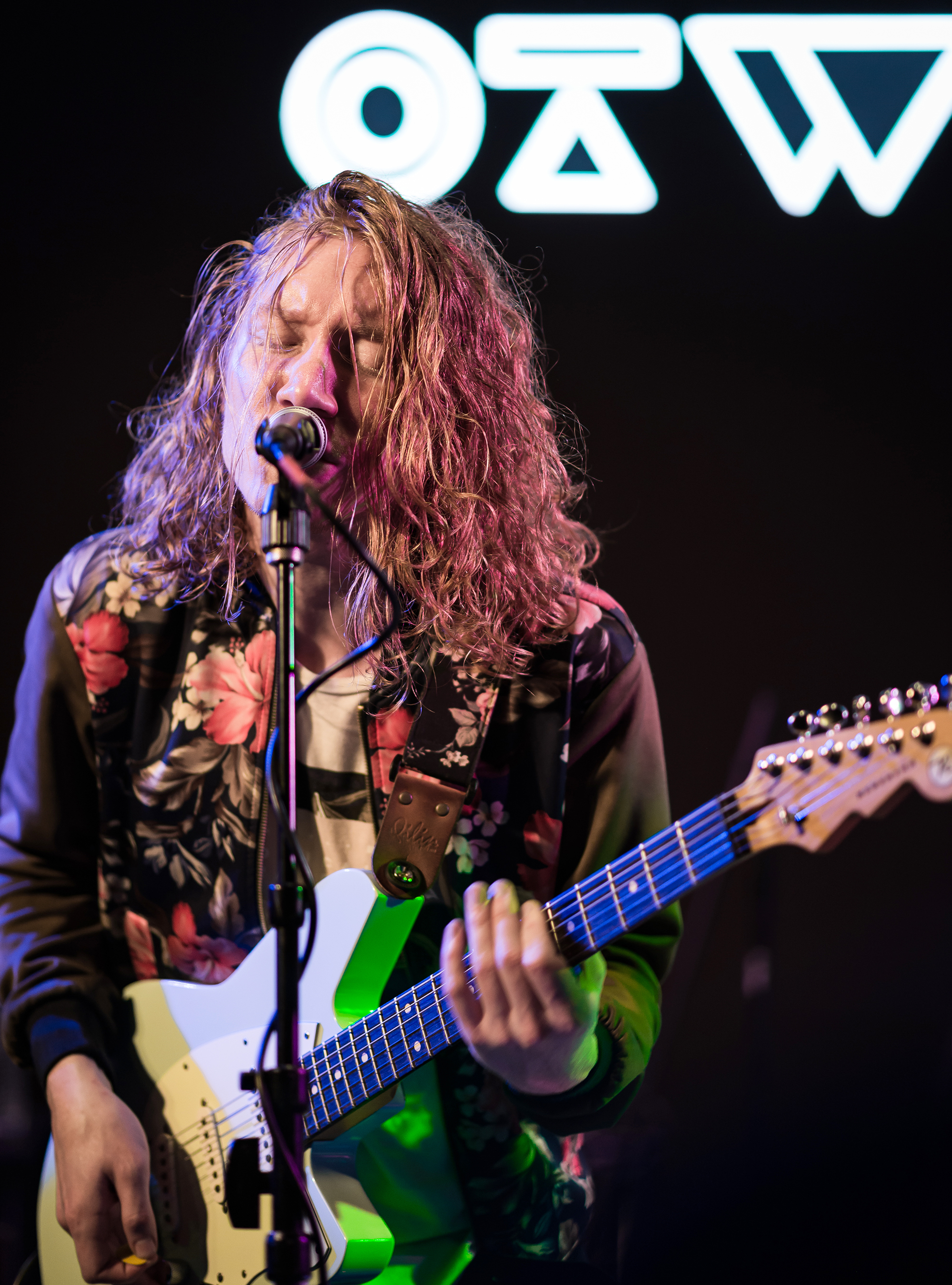
- Zach Grace of Flor performing in 2018

Background information
- Origin: Hood River, Oregon, United States
- Genres: Dream pop; indie pop; alternative rock
- Years active: 2014–present
- Labels: ENCI Records; Fueled by Ramen
- Members: Zach Grace; Kyle Hill
- Past members: McKinley Kitts; Dylan Bauld
- Website: florsounds.com

Flor (stylized as flor) (previously Sunderland) is an American indie pop band formed in Hood River, Oregon in 2014. The band currently consists of Zach Grace (lead vocals, guitar, keyboards) and Kyle Hill (drums).

== History ==
The band got its start in Hood River, Oregon, where Zach Grace, Dylan Bauld, and McKinley Kitts attended the same high school. The trio formed a band and later enlisted Kyle Hill, whom they met via Craigslist.

The quartet eventually moved to Los Angeles, named themselves Flor, and connected with photographer/designer Jade Ehlers, who helped them come up with distinctive visuals. They released their debut single, "heart", online in 2014, with the Sounds EP arriving that October and the full-length Sights & Sounds in 2015. Flor toured with Halsey in the fall of 2015 and signed to Fueled by Ramen in 2016, which reissued the Sounds EP that February.

Their debut album, come out. you’re hiding was released on May 19, 2017. The album title was teased in a tweet on March 23 before being confirmed in another tweet the next day. The album's lead single, "guarded", was released the same day.

On March 8, 2019, Flor released the single "slow motion". On July 10, they announced their second studio album, ley lines. It came out on September 6, 2019, and includes twelve songs. When asked about the inspiration behind the album, lead singer Grace said, "There's a theory that important places of power like Stonehenge or the Pyramids of Giza are connected by invisible lines. As a parallel, I needed to find my own anchor points for belief and purpose. I realized you can build those roads yourself. Friends, family, and the band are my anchors. The music comes out of the 'ley lines'". On November 11, 2019, they announced a North American headline tour.

In early 2020, the band launched the EP reimagined, new versions of four of their hit songs and a cover song. It was released in two parts: reimagined pt. 1, consisting of "warm blood", "slow motion", and a cover of Coldplay's "yellow", which featured Misterwives, in February; and reimagined pt. 2, consisting of "white noise" and "unsaid", in July.

On August 19, they released the standalone single "lmho", which was originally written around the time they completed their debut album. Grace described the song as his way of "spilling my sadness, confusion, and heartache into [...] music". As a substitution for their lack of touring due to the COVID-19 pandemic, the band premiered a live at-home performance exclusively on their YouTube channel in December 2020.

On December 1, 2021, they debuted the single "have yourself a merry little christmas", a cover of the song of the same title. This was the only material the band released in 2021.

On February 17, 2022, Flor premiered "Play Along" as the lead single from their anticipated third studio album, Future Shine. The new album was announced on March 23, alongside the release of the singles "Skate" and "Big Shot". It was released on May 6, 2022. In support of the album, they performed three shows entitled "flor in Twenty-Four", where they toured New York City, Los Angeles, and their hometown of Hood River in only twenty-four hours. The shows were then followed by a North American headline tour in September and October 2022.

On September 2, 2022, the band released the single "Every Night". It serves as an additional track to the DSP version of their latest album.

On February 24, 2023, Kitts announced his departure from the band to raise his family, making Flor a trio. On October 27, the group issued the single "Same Color as the Sun" independently, marking their first release of 2023 as well as their first since leaving Fueled by Ramen. The single was followed by "Warm Blood Pt 2" on February 23, 2024, "Nosedive" on April 19, and "Kick It" on May 17.

On January 3, 2025, Bauld announced his departure from the band.

== Band members ==
Current

- Zach Grace – lead vocals, guitar, keyboards (2014–present)
- Kyle Hill – drums, percussion (2014–present)

Past

- McKinley Kitts – guitar, backing vocals (2014–2023)
- Dylan Bauld – bass guitar, backing vocals, production (2014–2025)

Touring

- Val Hoyt – guitar, backing vocals (2022–present)

== Discography ==
=== Studio albums ===
Title	Album details
come out. you're hiding	Released: May 19, 2017 (standard edition); February 2, 2018 (deluxe edition); Label: Fueled by Ramen; Formats: Digital download, CD, LP
ley lines	Released: September 6, 2019; Label: Fueled by Ramen; Formats: Digital download, LP
Future Shine	Released: May 6, 2022 (standard edition); July 7, 2023 (deluxe edition) (Note: Available only on vinyl); Label: Fueled by Ramen; Formats: Digital download, CD, LP, cassette

=== EPs ===
Title	Album details
sounds	Released: February 10, 2015; Label: Fueled by Ramen; Formats: Digital download
reimagined	Released: February 7, 2020 (part 1); July 15, 2020 (part 2); Label: Fueled by Ramen; Formats: Digital download

=== Singles ===
Title	Year	Album
"heart" (Note: "heart" also features on Flor's debut album, come out. you're hiding.)	2014	sounds EP
"let me in"	2016	sounds EP
"still standing still" (feat. Lostboycrow)	2016	Non-album single
"hold on"	2017	come out. you're hiding
"guarded"	2017	come out. you're hiding
"overbehind"	2017	come out. you're hiding
"get behind this" (re-release)	2018	Non-album single
"slow motion"	2019	ley lines
"dancing around"	2019	ley lines
"little light one"	2019	ley lines
"ley lines"	2019	ley lines
"money"	2019	ley lines
"lmho"	2020	Non-album singles
"have yourself a merry little christmas"	2021	Non-album singles
"Play Along"	2022	Future Shine
"Skate"	2022	Future Shine
"Big Shot"	2022	Future Shine
"Gotta Do Something"	2022	Future Shine
"Every Night"	2022	Future Shine
"I Fall Apart" (live in studio)	2022	Non-album singles
"Same Color as the Sun"	2023	Non-album singles
"Warm Blood Pt 2"	2024	Non-album singles
"Nosedive"	2024	Non-album singles
"Kick It"	2024	Non-album singles
"Tethered"	2024	Non-album singles
"Painted"	2024	Non-album singles

=== Guest appearances ===
Title	Year	Other artist(s)	Album
"Together Again"	2025	Said the Sky	Closer to the Sun
