= Ashes to Ashes =

Ashes to Ashes may refer to:

== In religion ==
- "Ashes to ashes, dust to dust", a phrase from the Anglican Book of Common Prayer burial service

== In literature ==
- Ashes to Ashes (play), by Harold Pinter, 1996
- Ashes to Ashes (Kluger book), by Richard Kluger, about smoking in the United States, 1996
- Ashes to Ashes (novel), by Tami Hoag, 1999
- Ashes to Ashes, by Isabel Ostrander

== In films ==
- Ashes to Ashes (Wednesday Theatre), an Australian television play
- Ashes to Ashes (film), by Wayne Gerard Trotman
- Pumpkinhead: Ashes to Ashes, 2006 made-for-television sequel in the Pumpkinhead franchise of horror films

== In television ==
- Ashes to Ashes (British TV series), a follow-on from the BBC drama Life on Mars
- Ashes to Ashes (South African TV series)
- "Ashes to Ashes" (Only Fools and Horses), an episode of Only Fools and Horses
- "Ashes to Ashes" (Star Trek: Voyager), an episode of Star Trek: Voyager
- "Ashes to Ashes" (CSI: Miami), an episode of CSI: Miami
- Ashes to Ashes (Columbo), a 1998 television movie
- "Ashes to Ashes" (The Originals)

== Music ==
=== Albums ===
- Ashes to Ashes (soundtrack album), a soundtrack album of the BBC series
- Ashes to Ashes (David Shankle Group album)
- Ashes to Ashes (Chelsea Grin album), 2014
- Ashes to Ashes (mixtape), a 2010 mixtape released by Rick Ross
- Ashes to Ashes Live, a 2010 DVD by doom metal act Candlemass
- Ashes to Ashes, a 1990 album by Joe Sample

=== Songs ===
- "Ashes to Ashes" (The 5th Dimension song), 1973
- "Ashes to Ashes" (David Bowie song), 1980
- "Ashes to Ashes" (Faith No More song), 1997
- "Ashes to Ashes" (Anna Bergendahl song), 2019
- "Asche zu Asche", Ashes to Ashes in English, a song by Rammstein
- "Ashes to Ashes", a 1991 song by the Norwegian band Apoptygma Berzerk
- "Ashes to Ashes", from the Benedictum album Uncreation
- "Ashes to Ashes", from the Blind Guardian album Somewhere Far Beyond
- "Ashes to Ashes", by Damageplan featuring Jerry Cantrell from The Punisher: The Album
- "Ashes to Ashes", from the Heavenly album Dust to Dust
- "Ashes to Ashes", from the Kamelot album Silverthorn
- "Ashes to Ashes", from the Sirenia album Dim Days of Dolor
- "Ashes to Ashes", from the Steve Earle album Jerusalem
- "Ashes to Ashes", from the Tangerine Dream album Electronic Meditation
- "Ashes to Ashes", from the Vinnie Vincent Invasion album All Systems Go

== In games ==
- Ashes to Ashes (Vampire: The Masquerade), a 1991 tabletop role-playing game book
- Ashes to Ashes (video game), a 1996 video game from Corel Corporation

== See also ==
- Ashes 2 Ashes, a story from the Army of Darkness comic spin-off
- Ashes, Ashes (1943 novel), science fiction novel by René Barjavel
  - Ashes, Ashes (comic book), a 2016–2021 comic adaptation of Barjavel's novel
- "Ashes, Ashes" (The Defenders)
- Ashes Ashes, 2002 album by Leiahdorus
- Dust to Dust (disambiguation)
- "Dust in the Wind", a song by Kansas
- Ashes (disambiguation)
- Ash (disambiguation)
- "Sashes to Sashes", 2025 episode of The Simpsons
