= Kill the Messenger =

Kill the Messenger may refer to:

- Shooting the messenger, a metaphoric phrase used to describe holding to blame the (blameless) bearer of bad news

== Film and television ==
- Kill the Messenger (2006 film), a French documentary film about Sibel Edmonds
- Kill the Messenger (2014 film), an American drama film based on Schou's book
- "Kill the Messenger" (Justified), an episode of the television series Justified
- "Kill the Messenger", an episode of the American TV series Castle
- "Kill the Messenger", an episode of NCIS
- Chris Rock: Kill the Messenger, a stand-up comedy special by Chris Rock

== Literature ==
- Kill the Messenger (novel), by Tami Hoag
- Kill the Messenger (Schou book), a nonfiction book by Nick Schou about investigative reporter Gary Webb
- Kill the Messenger...Again, a nonfiction book by Bernard Ingham
- Kill the Messenger Who Brings Bad News (also known as Kill the Messenger), a poetry collection by Robert Kelly

== Music ==
- "Kill the Messenger", a song by Jack's Mannequin from Everything in Transit
- "Kill the Messenger", a song by Aesop Rock from Bazooka Tooth
