= People and Things =

Studio album by Jack's Mannequin
- Released: October 4, 2011
- Recorded: November 2010 – January 2011
- Studio: Plyrz; Lightning Sound; Mid City Sound; Fourth Street; Capitol
- Genre: Alternative rock
- Length: 40:32
- Label: Sire
- Producer: Jim Scott; Rob Cavallo; Andrew McMahon; Jay McMillan

Jack's Mannequin chronology
The Glass Passenger (2008)	People and Things (2011)	Live from the El Rey Theatre (2013)

Singles from People and Things
- 1. "My Racing Thoughts" Released: August 2, 2011; 2. "Release Me" Released: November 8, 2011

People and Things is the third and final studio album by American rock band Jack's Mannequin. It was released on October 4, 2011, through Sire Records. Following the release of The Glass Passenger (2008), the band's vocalist and pianist, Andrew McMahon, spent time during 2009 and 2010 writing, recording and then scrapping tracks for the follow-up. Shifting focus to his live band in a period during 2010, they began to work on new material. With the aid of producers Jim Scott and Rob Cavallo, the album was recorded at several studios from November 2010 to January 2011. The lead single "My Racing Thoughts" was released in August 2011, followed by the release of "Release Me" in November of that year, which was promoted by an appearance on The Tonight Show with Jay Leno.

People and Things is an alternative rock album that took inspiration from some of McMahon's favorite musicians and contemporaneous acts. McMahon solely wrote the majority of it alone but some songs were co-written with Jaren Johnston of American Bang and Matt Thiessen of Relient K. The main theme is relationships; the songs are about marriage, family and the difficulties of maintaining a relationship. McMahon worked on the album with a variety of session musicians and members of bands, including Jamie Muhoberac, Chris Chaney of Jane's Addiction, and Patrick Warren.

People and Things received generally positive reviews from music critics, some of whom praised the songwriting. The album charted at number nine on the US Billboard 200, selling 31,000 copies in the first week. It also performed well on the Billboard Alternative, Top Rock, and Vinyl component charts. Jack's Mannequin embarked on tours of the United States, Australia and Japan.

== Background and development ==
Jack's Mannequin's second studio album The Glass Passenger experienced several delays from its initially planned release date of April 2008, eventually being released in September of that year. With the release of the album, the band's frontman Andrew McMahon was free to write again, after having artistically and financially struggled during the making of it. He felt The Glass Passenger would begin a new period of writing, allowing stream of consciousness material to be written. Between mid-June and early August 2009, Jack's Mannequin toured the United States with the Fray and following the tour, the band began working on their next album. In October 2009, McMahon went on a solo US tour to promote his documentary film Dear Jack (2009), which follows him during his 2005 battle with leukemia.

Jack's Mannequin were due to support Weezer's headlining US tour in December 2009 and January 2010, which was ultimately canceled. As a result, McMahon decided to continue working on the band's then-upcoming album earlier than intended and sessions were held with producer John Fields. Up to this point, McMahon had collaborated with long-time producer Jim Wirt and wanted to work with a different producer. McMahon followed the same process that he used for The Glass Passenger and Jack's Mannequin's debut studio album Everything in Transit (2005); he would enter the studio with a song, record piano and vocals, and build the recording off that. He initially thought the best practice was to be in a studio with several people to help expand the recording from his initial ideas.

The band embarked on a headlining US tour from February to March 2010, with support from Fun and Vendera. In June of that year, McMahon came to the realisation that he wasn't comfortable with putting out the songs that he had recorded at the time. He wanted the fans to hear what a live band would sound like on an album, and decided to scrap most of the recordings. Shortly afterwards, McMahon kept some of the tracks that had already been recorded, before writing a lot of new songs. In July 2010, him and the other members of Jack's Mannequin met up in Silver Lake, Los Angeles. While in the neighbourhood, McMahon proposed to rent a place and work on the songs in a band practice-style, similarly to how McMahon used to work when he was a member of Something Corporate, with whom McMahon joined for a reunion tour the following month.

== Production ==
In September 2010, Jack's Mannequin rented a house in Joshua Tree, California, where they wrote dozens of songs for the subsequent two months. Partway through this period, in late October, Mikey Wagner joined the band. Former bassist Jon Sullivan wanted to go in a musically different direction, which Jack's Mannequin were aware of and they brought in Wagner. The band traveled between Joshua Tree and Valencia, Santa Clarita, California, where the studio is located. They wanted a producer who was skilled at recording bands live, and eventually contacted Jim Scott, who had worked on some of McMahon's favorite albums. Scott subsequently produced and engineered during Jack's Mannequin's sessions, most of which were held at Plyrz Studios, Lightning Sound Studios, and Mid City Sound. Further recording was done at Fourth Street Recording for the track "My Racing Thoughts". Jack's Mannequin recorded live with a line-up that consisted of guitarist Bobby Anderson on bass, McMahon on piano and Jay McMillan on drums. McMahon said they recorded as a three-piece without Wagner, with him not wanting to change the studio atmosphere. Wagner had only played two shows with the band by that point, while McMahon had been playing with Anderson and McMillan for five or six years.

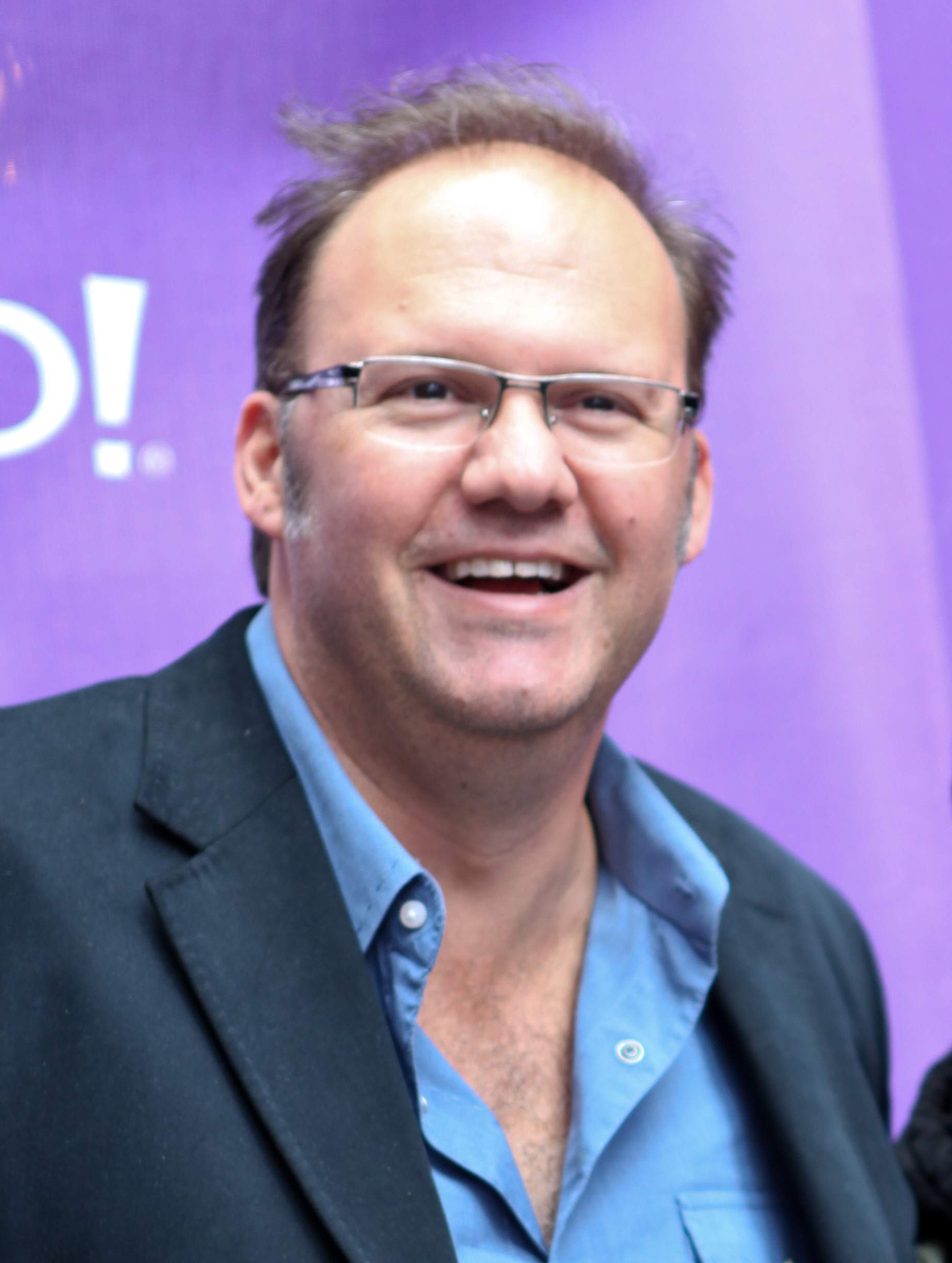
Rob Cavallo came into the production towards its end, subsequently earning himself credit as a producer.

People and Things marked the first time the band had worked on an album predominantly as a group effort; the two previous Jack's Mannequin albums were mainly handled by McMahon. By November 2010, the band were in the process of recording 16 or 17 songs, with them planning to revisit the recordings with guitars and vocal overdubs over the next two months. They would later collaborate with Rob Cavallo and Wirt, and also went on to work with Sebastian Steinberg of Soul Coughing, Chris Chaney of Jane's Addiction, and Tim Pierce, and Patrick Warren. When production was winding down in January 2011, Cavallo "saved the day in a lot of ways", according to McMahon. Once McMahon gave his record label Sire Records the recordings, he felt a track was missing. Cavallo asked McMahon if he had another song to record; McMahon, who had a number of tracks ready, showed him "Release Me". The song was recorded in two days with people from the sessions, while the piano part was recorded at Capitol Studios. The final recordings were credited to being produced by Scott (on all tracks except "Release Me"), Cavallo (all tracks except "Restless Dream"), and McMahon, with Anderson and McMillan serving as co-producers on all tracks except "Release Me". Production of the song was credited to Cavallo and McMahon.

Wirt contributed additional production to all tracks except "Release Me", "Restless Dream" and "Casting Lines". Doug McKean and Kevin Dean served as engineers throughout the sessions; McKean solely for "Release Me" at Lightning Sound, while "Restless Dream" was engineered by Dean and Scott. Jeff Hannan handled additional engineering on "Release Me", alongside engineer Spencer Guerra, as well as "Television", "Amy, I", "Hey Hey Hey (We're All Gonna Die)", "People, Running", "Amelia Jean", "Platform Fire", and "Hostage". Steve Rea and Russ Waugh acted as assistant engineers on all tracks except for "Restless Dream", and they were aided by engineer Aaron Walk for "Release Me". Nigel Lundemo and Lars Fox were additional Pro Tools engineers; the latter on "Release Me" and the former on "My Racing Thoughts", "Television", "Amy, I", "People, Running", and "Amelia Jean". Chris Lord-Alge mixed the recordings at Mix LA, where he was assisted by Keith Armstrong, Nik Karpen, Brad Townsend and Andrew Schubert. The recordings were mastered by Ted Jensen at Sterling Sound.

== Composition ==
=== Music ===
People and Things has been classed as alternative rock and has drawn comparisons with the works of Bruce Springsteen, Billy Joel and Elton John. McMahon took inspiration from some of his favorite musicians, such as Joel, Paul Simon and Neil Young, as well as newer music by bands including Mumford & Sons, Phoenix and Arcade Fire. He leaned towards his favorite musicians because he was aware of the popularity of indie music at the time and wanted to do something different. Compared to the band's past works, the piano was not at the forefront of the songs, something McMahon approached from a production viewpoint rather than a self-serving one. He wanted an organic feeling that worked for each track, which meant viewing songs from the other instruments' perspectives. The album's songs were focused around the vocals and instrumental arrangements were focused around the lyrics. Most of the tracks were written by McMahon alone, with the exception of "Television", "Amy, I", "People, Running" and "Platform Fire".

McMahon co-wrote "Television" with Jaren Johnston of American Bang, and "Amy, I", "People, Running" and "Platform Fire" with Matt Thiessen of Relient K in Nashville, Tennessee, in January 2010. In addition to their regular roles, McMahon and Anderson performed extra instrumentation; McMahon played percussion on "My Racing Thoughts" and "Television", and keyboards on "My Racing Thoughts", "Television", "People, Running" and "Hostage"; Anderson arranged the strings on "Hey Hey Hey (We're All Gonna Die)" and played bass on "Amelia Jean". Pierce played guitar on every track except for "Restless Dream", which solely features Anderson on acoustic guitar. Session musician Jamie Muhoberac added keyboards to most of the tracks while McMahon and Warren handled the remainder, and played a B3 Hammond organ on "My Racing Thoughts", "Hey Hey Hey (We're All Gonna Die)" and "People, Running". Chaney played bass guitar on almost all of the tracks, except "Amelia Jean", on which it was played by Anderson, and "Restless Dream", on which it was played by Wirt.

=== Lyrical themes ===
Discussing the album's title, People and Things, McMahon said he loved the starkness of the two words' adjacency, which he has said references the tone of the songs and the transparency of love from a different viewpoint. McMahon thought of the title while working on the band's seventh EP Dear Jack EP (2009) in a studio with Dean. He viewed the album's release as the final part of the Jack's Mannequin story, which was initially intended to only last for one album. Everything in Transit deals with McMahon's break-up with his girlfriend, whom he would eventually marry. Due to his experience with leukemia in 2005, he felt there was a lack of closure that extended the Jack's Mannequin story over three albums. The Glass Passenger is mostly about the aftermath of his leukemia diagnosis.

People and Things is a relationship record, for which McMahon's goal was to swap the "flowery language and sentiment" of new love with "starker, less blinded language about more binding love". Following the release of The Glass Passenger, his friends had got married and found jobs; McMahon said marriage is a "bit of a beast" to talk about on an album but admitted that when he wrote "My Racing Thoughts", the size of the subject of marriage became apparent to him. A lot of the material on People and Things was subsequently centered around the first few years of his marriage. Family and the difficulties of maintaining a relationship are also themes included on the album.

=== Tracks ===
"My Racing Thoughts" is about arguing with someone whom one has a close personal relationship with. The song stemmed from a fight McMahon had with his wife; it was the first track that was written for People and Things. The original demo had a lo-fi garage/techno sound to it, which he de-emphasized in favor of a rock-centric, full-band sound. The keyboard parts on the 1980s-influenced pop rock track "Release Me" were described as reminiscent of "Urgent" (1981) by Foreigner. It was the last song that was written for the album and is about the way music became McMahon's living, as well as where he was at in his life when he was finishing People and Things. McMahon worked on "Television" with Johnston, with whom he shared an A&R representative before they became" good friends. The two of them wanted to write a song about family, mainly for their parents, but it was fruitless endeavor. In one of McMahon's journals, he found a note that suggested writing a song about sleeping while a television was left on. The pair then came up with the concept of a couple having dinner before they descend into an argument. The couple still end up in the same bedroom, with the television filling in the silence. The track was compared to the music of U2 and its guitar riff resembles that of the Temper Trap's "Sweet Disposition" (2009); the track is centered around the D chord.

"Amy, I" was written after McMahon and Thiessen spent a night drinking, and was inspired by snow on trees in Nashville. It uses a winter metaphor for an inhospitable lover, and includes an anvil that was played by Scott. "Hey Hey Hey (We're All Gonna Die)" was written early during the writing process for The Glass Passenger, but was only half-written and left unrecorded for it. While on tour for the album, McMahon revisited a venue at which he played during the early days of Jack's Mannequin, where he wrote the song's third verse; according to him, "it just seemed appropriate somehow". The track includes the B3 Hammond organ, played by Phil Parlapiano, a violin played by Marisa Kuney, a viola played by Jeanie Lim, and a cello played by Mary Ginger Murphy. "People, Running", the second track to be co-written with Thiessen, was based on the title People and Things, and talks about the day-to-day life that people lead. The track builds on the broad theme of people looking for meaning, and the positives and negatives of life.

During the recording of The Glass Passenger, McMahon decided to take a rest-break partway through the sessions, and drove to New York City to meet a friend after learning of his plans to go on a surfing trip in Costa Rica. While traveling, McMahon bought a keyboard and worked on pieces of songs; he met up with his friend at a bar, which led to the creation of "Amelia Jean". "Platform Fire" is about life on the road; McMahon had written the first verse prior to working on the song with Thiessen, who visited McMahon in Los Angeles and finished it with him. McMahon was influenced by the film Man on Wire (2008), which he enjoyed. The country-influenced track "Hostage" is about people who are distant and impossible to hold down, who disappear whenever they feel like it. The song's occurring beat was suggested by Scott; he walked into the band jamming and told them to play the beat throughout.

Discussing "Restless Dream", McMahon said filmmakers asked him to contribute a song to a movie about a high-school reunion. He wrote the track and recorded it on the same day; Anderson picked up a guitar and came up with a fingerpicking style that McMahon wanted instantly. It is a guitar ballad that features Brandi Carlile on backing vocals; McMahon told his management team that he was interested in adding a harmony part and they put him in contact with Carlile. The song is about the possible directions a relationship could take, and was compared to the music of Dashboard Confessional. "Casting Lines" was a last-minute addition to People and Things; McMahon had initially been asked to submit a theme song for the television show Parenthood. Though McMahon did not have a child, he decided to talk about being a member of a family and its advantages as well as the disadvantages. He worked on the song when on stage while touring, and recorded a demo the following day. The day after McMahon submitted the song, the program's producers chose to use Bob Dylan's "Forever Young" (1974). The demo sat around for a while, until people brought it up to McMahon and suggested him recording the demo. The song discusses the theme of dealing with one's own fate while contemplating where they belong, coming across as a pseudo-sequel to "Boston" (2006) by Augustana. "Ten Days Gone" was written by McMahon after he relaxed at Laguna Beach, California, and features Tom Petty and the Heartbreakers drummer Steve Ferrone.

== Release and promotion ==
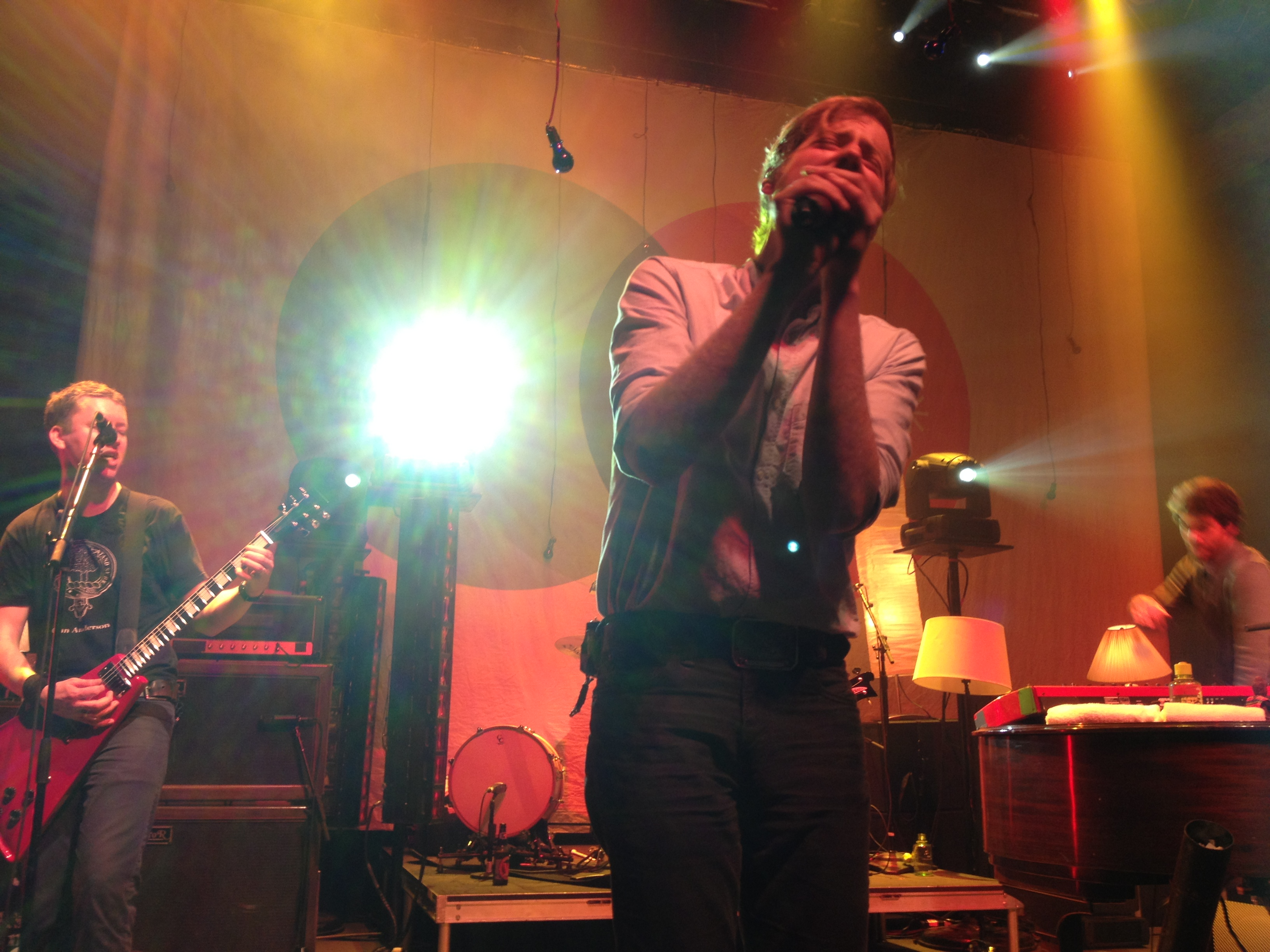
Jack's Mannequin performing in February 2012 on the album's tour.

McMahon and Anderson went on a brief Australian tour in February 2011 with support from Leena. During the tour, McMahon debuted "Restless Dream". On May 31, 2011, McMahon announced the album's title, People and Things, after which the band went on a headlining North American tour in June and July, with support from Steel Train, Lady Danville and River James. On July 20, People and Things was announced for release in October 2011 and "My Racing Thoughts" was made available for streaming on Jack's Mannequin's website and it was later released as the lead single on August 2 of that year. That same day, the album's track listing was revealed. The band played two dates on the Warped Tour and performed at the Kanrocksas Music Festival, before embarking on a co-headlining US tour with Guster in August and September 2011.

During the tour, Jack's Mannequin rotated several new songs between their performances. On August 12, 2011, the band posted an excerpt of "Amy, I" online, which was followed four days later by a video of them working on the track in the studio. A trailer for People and Things was released through Alternative Press' website on August 30 of that year. On September 26, 2011, "Television" premiered via Entertainment Weekly's website. Four days later, the music video for "My Racing Thoughts", which was directed by Anders Rostad, was released. People and Things was released on October 4, 2011, through Sire Records. The iTunes deluxe edition of the album includes the bonus tracks "No Man Is an Island", "Ten Days Gone", "Dancing with a Gun", and "Broken Bird". The Best Buy edition features demo recordings of songs from Everything in Transit and The Glass Passenger.

During the release week of People and Things, Jack's Mannequin held a number of events to promote it: a film screening in New York City, which consisted of short films for every song on the album—each of them were directed by a separate director from the US, UK, Germany and Australia; a livestream question-and-answer session and performance by McMahon; and a collaboration between the band and the Hartford Symphony Orchestra, during which they debuted orchestral arrangements of their songs. In October and November 2011, Jack's Mannequin went on the People and Things Tour of the US, for which they were supported by Motion City Soundtrack, Company of Thieves, Lady Danville, Lenka, Allen Stone, and Scars on 45.

"Release Me" was released as the second single from People and Things to US alternative radio stations on November 8, 2011. In early January 2012, the band performed "Release Me" on The Tonight Show with Jay Leno. Following this, Jack's Mannequin toured in Canada, Australia and Japan. An accompanying music video was released on May 1, 2012, which premiered through Buzznet. It was directed by Michael Goldberg and Matthew Campbell. The video shows a satirical view of music released under the influence of major companies.

== Reception ==
Professional ratings
Aggregate scores
Source	Rating
Metacritic	66/100
Review scores
Source	Rating
AllMusic	3.5/5 stars
American Songwriter	4/5 stars
Blurt	7/10 stars
Consequence of Sound	C−
IGN	7.5/10
Melodic	4/5 stars
PopMatters	4/10 stars
Sputnikmusic	4/5

People and Things was met with generally favorable reviews from music critics. At Metacritic, the album received an average score of 66, based on 8 reviews. AllMusic reviewer Andrew Leahey called it "[s]tronger than The Glass Passenger and spottier than Everything in Transit" and noted McMahon "consolidating his strengths". Eric Allen of American Songwriter wrote that the lyrics were "delivered with staunch veracity that makes the subject matter seem transcendent", and hailed the record as "the most musically cohesive album in the band's catalog thus far". Billboard writer Mikael Wood said the "more expensive" song arrangements compliment McMahon's "hyper-expressive" vocal style, though commented that they infrequently make his "songwriting feel less distinct than it has in the past". Blurt's John B. Moore stated that the lyrics on the album are still "a tad bit heavy on overwrought emotions" as they were during McMahon's Something Corporate days. He added that the lyrics come across as "a bit more genuine" from a man in his late 20s rather than from a teenager.

Consequence of Sound writer Nick Freed said People and Things "rarely fails" to provide the listener with "a little rush of melancholic joy". Despite calling it a "well-crafted" release "for longevity's sake", he admitted that it might be time for McMahon "to add a little change to his normal routine". Entertainment Weekly's Benjamin Wood compared the album to The Glass Passenger sonically, writing that a number of tracks "seem like cut-and-dry Passenger 2.0". He described the album as remaining mainly up-tempo, apart from one track; "Hey Hey Hey (We're All Gonna Die)". Chad Grischow of IGN said it had "good intentions, but comes off a bit too safe at points". He added that the "overproduced luster" of the record "weighs down" a few "potentially solid tunes". Melodic reviewer Johan Wippsson found that it "does not differ in quality" when compared to Everything in Transit and The Glass Passenger, and said the album was more "uptempo and happy" in comparison to the latter. PopMatters writer Brice Ezell criticized it as being as generic as the words the album's title consists of, adding: "The people and things of People and Things are about as ordinary as they come." Ezell explained that the album simply serves to "add more tuneful tracks" to Jack's Mannequin's repertoire, being "fine for a casual listen, but that's about all that it demands". Megan Rozell from the Seattle Post-Intelligencer said the album wraps up the loose ends of Everything in Transit and The Glass Passenger, tying them "together to create a mind-blowing sound" throughout the record. She continued, admitting that it comes across "such a more powerful way that it is sure to bring in more fans and keep dedicated fans close". Sputnikmusic staff writer Steve M called it "another piano-rock album" in the same strain of Something Corporate with the "lyrical maturity" of Passenger and the "fun elements" of Transit while remaining McMahon's "most cohesive work yet". According to the reviewer, the album "guarantees results for long-time fans" but "doesn't attract the kind of attention needed to spark a fresh interest" in the group.

People and Things charted at number nine on the US Billboard 200, selling 31,000 copies in its first week of release. The album further reached number one on US Alternative Albums, number two on Top Rock Albums, number five on Vinyl Albums, and number 20 on the Top Tastemaker Albums chart. "My Racing Thoughts" charted at number 43 on the US Rock Digital Song Sales chart, and number 68 on Japan's Hot 100.

== Track listing ==
Writing credits per booklet.

People and Things standard edition
No.	Title	Writer(s)	Producer	Length
1.	"My Racing Thoughts"	Andrew McMahon	Jim Scott; Rob Cavallo; McMahon; Bobby "Raw" Anderson (co.); Jay McMillan (co.)	4:19
2.	"Release Me"	McMahon	Cavallo; McMahon	3:16
3.	"Television"	McMahon; Jaren Johnston	Scott; Cavallo; McMahon; Anderson (co.); McMillan (co.)	3:37
4.	"Amy, I"	McMahon; Matt Thiessen	Scott; Cavallo; McMahon; Anderson (co.); McMillan (co.)	3:33
5.	"Hey Hey Hey (We're All Gonna Die)"	McMahon	Scott; Cavallo; McMahon; Anderson (co.); McMillan (co.)	3:37
6.	"People, Running"	McMahon; Thiessen	Scott; Cavallo; McMahon; Anderson (co.); McMillan (co.)	3:40
7.	"Amelia Jean"	McMahon	Scott; Cavallo; McMahon; Anderson (co.); McMillan (co.)	2:54
8.	"Platform Fire"	McMahon; Thiessen	Scott; Cavallo; McMahon; Anderson (co.); McMillan (co.)	3:31
9.	"Hostage"	McMahon	Scott; Cavallo; McMahon; Anderson (co.); McMillan (co.)	4:27
10.	"Restless Dream"	McMahon	Scott; McMahon; Anderson (co.); McMillan (co.)	3:55
11.	"Casting Lines"	McMahon	Scott; Cavallo; McMahon; Anderson (co.); McMillan (co.)	3:41
Total length:				40:32

iTunes bonus tracks
No.	Title	Length
12.	"No Man Is an Island"	3:16
13.	"Ten Days Gone"	3:32
14.	"Dancing with a Gun"	2:55
15.	"Broken Bird"	3:33

Best Buy bonus tracks
No.	Title	Length
12.	"Out of It" (Passenger demonstration tape)	4:04
13.	"Locked Doors" (Transit demonstration tape)	3:53
14.	"Keep Rising" (Passenger demonstration tape)	4:05

== Personnel ==
Personnel per booklet.

Jack's Mannequin

- Andrew McMahon – lead vocals, piano (all except track 10), percussion (tracks 1 and 3), keyboards (tracks 1, 3, 6 and 9)
- Bobby "Raw" Anderson – guitar, background vocals (all except track 10), string arrangement (track 5), bass (track 7)
- Jay McMillan – drums (all except track 10), percussion (all except track 10)

Additional musicians

- Tim Pierce – guitars (all except track 10)
- Jamie Muhoberac – keyboards (tracks 1–4, 6 and 9), B3 Hammond organ (tracks 1, 5 and 6)
- Chris Chaney – bass (tracks 1–6, 9 and 11)
- Patrick Warren – keyboards (tracks 1, 8, 10 and 11), arrangement (tracks 8, 10 and 11)
- Jim Scott – anvil (track 4)
- Phil Parlapiano – B3 Hammond organ (track 5)
- Marisa Kuney – violin (track 5)
- Jeanie Lim – viola (track 5)
- Mary Ginger Murphy – cello (track 5)
- Jim Wirt – bass (track 8)
- Brandi Carlile – background vocals (track 10)

Production

- Jim Scott – producer (all except track 2), engineer (all except tracks 2)
- Rob Cavallo – producer (all except track 10)
- Andrew McMahon – producer
- Bobby "Raw" Anderson – co-producer (all except track 2)
- Jay McMillan – co-producer (all except track 2)
- Jim Wirt – additional production (all except tracks 2, 10 and 11)
- Doug McKean – engineer (all except track 10)
- Kevin Dean – engineer (all except tracks 2)
- Jeff Hannan – additional engineer (tracks 1 and 3–9)
- Spencer Guerra – additional engineer (track 1)
- Steve Rea – assistant engineer (all except tracks 10)
- Russ Waugh – assistant engineer (all except tracks 10)
- Aaron Walk – assistant engineer (track 2)
- Nigel Lundemo – additional Pro Tools engineer (tracks 1, 3, 4, 6, 7 and 11)
- Lars Fox – additional Pro Tools engineer (track 2)
- Chris Lord-Alge – mixing
- Keith Armstrong – assistant mix engineer
- Nik Karpen – assistant mix engineer
- Brad Townsend – assistant mix engineer
- Andrew Schubert – assistant mix engineer
- Ted Jensen – mastering
- Concepcion Studios – art direct
- Patrick Concepcion – illustrations

== Charts ==
Chart performance for People and Things
Chart (2011)	Peak position
US Billboard 200	9
US Top Alternative Albums (Billboard)	1
US Top Rock Albums (Billboard)	2
US Indie Store Album Sales (Billboard)	20
US Vinyl Albums (Billboard)	5

== See also ==
- The Pop Underground – McMahon's first post-Jack's Mannequin release
