= The Glass Passenger =

Studio album by Jack's Mannequin
- Released: September 30, 2008
- Recorded: December 2007 – May 2008
- Studios: 4th Street Recording; Sound City; Pedernales Studio; Sunset Sound; Fox Force Five Recordings; Ameraycan Studios; Paramount Studios; Rock Xentral; Studio Delux; Blue World Music
- Genre: Power pop
- Length: 56:54
- Labels: Sire, Warner Bros.
- Producers: Andrew McMahon; Jim Wirt; CJ Eiriksson

Jack's Mannequin chronology
Everything in Transit (2005)	The Glass Passenger (2008)	People and Things (2011)

Singles from The Glass Passenger
- 1. "The Resolution" Released: August 19, 2008; 2. "Swim" Released: June 2009

The Glass Passenger is the second studio album by American rock band Jack's Mannequin. Frontman Andrew McMahon was diagnosed with acute lymphoblastic leukemia in mid-2005 following the recording of their debut album Everything in Transit. While touring, McMahon suffered from writer's block, which did not dissipate until mid-2006; many of the songs that would appear on The Glass Passenger were written mid-to-late 2007. Further writing sessions were held when a number of the dates were cancelled due to McMahon suffering from exhaustion and fatigue. The Glass Passenger was produced by McMahon and Jim Wirt and co-produced by CJ Eiriksson; the tracking marked the first time McMahon worked with the band in the studio.

Though the main recording sessions took place at two California-based studios (4th Street Recording and Sound City), additional recording followed at several other studios in both California and Texas. Most of the recording was done by December 2007, but label and business problems started to creep into the sessions, resulting in McMahon going on a sabbatical in January 2008. Around this time, the band signed to Sire Records and scheduled the album's release for April/May. Musically a power pop album, with comparisons to Ben Folds and Bruce Hornsby, The Glass Passenger saw McMahon focus on the aftermath and the recovery from his leukemia, backed with a new-found perspective on the world.

A club tour, a stint on the Warped Tour and a support slot for Paramore led into the release of "The Resolution" as a single in mid-August, prior to the eventual release of The Glass Passenger on September 30. It sold 49,000 copies in its first week, charting at number eight on the Billboard 200, and reached the top 10 on other Billboard charts. The album received a positive reception from critics, with a few commenting on lyrics and the record serving as a good follow-up, or even besting, Everything in Transit. Touring continued with another US club tour at the end of the year, shows in Japan and Australia in early 2009, and two further US tours (a two-month headliner and a three-month support slot for the Fray). "Swim" was released as a single in June.

== Background ==
Jack's Mannequin's debut album Everything in Transit was released in August 2005 through Maverick Records. A few months before its release, frontman Andrew McMahon had been diagnosed with acute lymphoblastic leukemia and spent several months undergoing chemotherapy treatment. His sickness shifted his focus from writing new music to getting better. Jack's Mannequin played its first concert following McMahon's diagnosis in December of that year. The band began several tours over the next two years, both supporting the likes of O.A.R. and Panic! at the Disco in 2006 and also headlining shows, including Tour for a Cure and the West Coast Winter Tour. McMahon had waited until he recovered before he began the writing. He soon went through a period of writer's block after being unable to convey his illness through his songs. Around this time, he was working on Treaty of Paris' debut album Sweet Dreams, Sucker for his label Airport Tapes and Records.

By July 2006, he had worked through the writer's block and was writing alone in a studio. He said the material was specifically intended for the next Jack's Mannequin record and was reminiscent of the Postal Service and Beck's Sea Change (2002). With the touring cycle for Everything in Transit finishing in March 2007, McMahon focused on writing new material, though he was unsure if it would be for Jack's Mannequin or his other band Something Corporate. After writing "Crashin", McMahon wrote much more material. Most of the songs that would appear on the next record were written in summer 2008, though a few tracks, like "What Gets You Off", were written earlier in July 2007. The band had planned to tour in October, however, due to the constant touring over the preceding 14 months, McMahon suffered mental exhaustion and physical fatigue. The tour was cancelled as a result. They accumulated newly written material in October and November.

== Production ==
The album's main tracking sessions took place at 4th Street Recording in Santa Monica, California, with engineer Spencer Guerra, and Sound City in Van Nuys, California, with engineer Adam Fuller. McMahon used the same production team—Jim Wirt and CJ Eiriksson—from the Everything in Transit sessions: McMahon and Wirt assumed producer duties, while Eiriksson handled co-producer and engineering roles. Bandmate Bobby 'Raw' Anderson did additional production, while Max Coane took on other engineering. Further recording was done at a variety of studios with or without secondary engineers: Pedernales Studio in Austin, Texas, with Jacob Sciba, Jared Dodd and Bobby Huber; Sunset Sound in Hollywood, California, with Grahm Hope and Clifton Allen; Fox Force Five Recordings in Hollywood; Ameraycan Studios in North Hollywood with Alek Edmonds and Mat Camara; Paramount Studios in Hollywood with Nicolas Fournier; Rock Xentral in Sherman Oaks, California, with Jose Alcantar; Studio Delux in Van Nuys; and Blue World Music in Dripping Springs, Texas. Neil Couser handled additional engineering on "What Gets You Off", as did Pete Martinez on "Suicide Blonde". Chris Rezanson contributed additional programming on "American Love".

McMahon wanted to make a "very organic" and "natural-sounding" album that stood apart from a few of the "more digital approaches" used when recording music. These sessions marked the first time McMahon worked in the studio with his backing band, which consisted of Anderson, bassist Jon Sullivan and drummer Jay McMillan. McMahon mentioned the studio dynamic changed slightly having his band in the studio with him, giving it a more familiar feeling. Wanting to have the album "feel played", as opposed to "chopped up and doctored", a lot of ideas were shared among everyone in the studio—six or seven people at any given time. McMahon had some trouble with his label Sire/Warner Bros. Records, which was in the process of internal changes. Among other things, he was unsure who he was supposed to play his music to, and who oversaw the recording budget. Occasionally, the recording process was halted until details had been settled with his label. Most of the recording was done by December; additional vocals and overdubs were tracked later that month. The album was planned to be mixed in January, however, the business process began to overwhelm the recording process. McMahon decided to take a sabbatical that month instead. He learned of a friend's plans to go on a surfing trip in Costa Rica and drove to New York, before the two flew to Costa Rica. Recording eventually concluded in May, with a total of 24 songs being tracked. Chris Lord-Alge mixed the recordings, while Ted Jensen mastered them at Sterling Sound Studios in New York.

== Composition ==
The album's title The Glass Passenger is taken from "Hey Hey Hey (We're All Gonna Die)", a track written early in the writing process. Ultimately, it was not recorded for the album but appeared on the band's next album People and Things (2011). McMahon said it was symbolic of his fragile state in the days leading up to his diagnosis. He wanted to avoid writing "the cancer record" as he described it, preferring instead to tackle other themes that had cropped up in his life—the most common being able to find "light in the struggle [of getting through life]". The material dealt mainly with the aftermath and recovery from his illness and his new-found perspective on the world. Musically, the album's sound has been classed as power pop, with comparisons being made to Ben Folds, and McMahon's piano playing being described as reminiscent of Bruce Hornsby.

"Crashin" is about suffering from writer's block and being able to get through it. The pop rock track "Spinning" has quiet verses; it features McMahon harmonizing with Stacy Clark. McMahon was in the post-recovery stage of his treatment dealing with posttraumatic stress and depression. One night, he wrote several words on a piece of paper. When he woke, he saw the word "Swim"; he viewed it as a sign to pull himself out of his issues. "Swim" became the song with which McMahon felt he would overcome his problems. "American Love", alongside "Bloodshot", channels new wave with additional keyboards by Patrick Warren, and horn instrumentation by Grooveline Horns. McMahon had trouble writing it initially, until he looked through his journal. He highlighted phrases written in the preceding six months and wrote verses with these lines in them. They describe a person struggling in a bad situation. "What Gets You Off" is about the recovery of McMahon's libido. "Suicide Blonde" features new wave-style guitar parts, alongside McMahon, Wirt and Anderson playing kazoos, and Sullivan using a talk box. "Annie Use Your Telescope" initially lasted for two-and-a-half minutes, until Wirt suggested it be extended. It features strings, and Sullivan playing the upright bass.

"Bloodshot" features reggae-influenced verses with McMahon, McMillan and Sullivan providing hand claps and stomping. McMahon said it was a character study of people other than himself. "Drop Out - The So Unknown" is a power pop track, in the vein of Folds. "Hammers and Strings (A Lullaby)" is an ode to the piano and has its origins during McMahon's time in Something Corporate. "The Resolution" and "Caves" talk about McMahon's battle with cancer. The title for "Caves" came from the name of the rehearsal space where he wrote it. McMahon came up with the song's piano hook after hearing it in his head at 2:00 AM. He got up, went to his piano and began writing the track, which he tried to avoid writing as he "wasn't sure [he] wanted to live it again". Each verse of the latter track is about a different occasion while he was in hospital. The first half of track has McMahon playing the piano and singing in a falsetto before the piano speeds up and fades out, prior to the full-band performing. The second half of the song addresses the aftermath of him leaving the hospital. "Cell Phone" is an outtake tracked at the end of the Everything in Transit sessions but was left unfinished at the time. Its theme is relationship-centric; while recovering from his illness in the studio he re-listened to the song and re-wrote it.

== Release ==
=== Initial promotion and delays ===
In December 2007, The Glass Passenger was announced as the title of Jack's Mannequin's next album. Later that month, McMahon said the album was expected to be released in April/May 2008. On January 30, 2008, it was disclosed the band had signed to Sire Records having been moved to Sire by Warner Bros. after Maverick Records folded. On February 25, the album was announced for release on April 22 but was eventually pushed back. AbsolutePunk reported on June 3 the album had been mixed and was in the process of being mastered in New York. During July, McMahon told the Montclair State University student newspaper the release date would be moved to late August or early September 2008. On July 18, the album's final release date was given as September 30. The album's track listing and artwork was revealed on July 28. "The Resolution" was posted on the group's Myspace profile on August 4. On August 5, an EP titled The Ghost Overground was released exclusively on iTunes. It contains two new songs "The Resolution" and "Bloodshot", and live versions of "Kill the Messenger" and "Holiday from Real".

"The Resolution" was released to radio on August 19; a music video was filmed for the track in early September. McMahon combed through video treatments. Though he saw some positive ones, McMahon felt nothing stood out. Someone at his label suggested he think beyond simply approaching video directors; McMahon suggested author Stephenie Meyer. She had been a fan of his work, even going as far as naming him as an inspiration for her own work. The group contacted her and ask if she would be interested. She had no experience directing so collaborated with co-director Noble Jones. Meyer's treatment came about after studying the song's lyrics. When Jones heard the treatment would cost more than their budget allowed, he made a few adjustments. Meyer then re-watched music videos she loved to get a sense of style, including those for OK Go's "Here It Goes Again", Brand New's "Sic Transit Gloria... Glory Fades" and My Chemical Romance's "Helena". The video was filmed over a 14-hour period off the Pacific Coast Highway, and required three set pieces—an ocean, a desert and a mountaintop.

=== Eventual release and further promotion ===
A new EP entitled In Valleys, also an iTunes exclusive, was released on September 9. It included "Swim", "Cell Phone", "In Slow Motion (Sleazy Wednesday)" and "At Full Speed". On the initial EP, "At Full Speed" was incorrectly titled "Annie Use Your Telescope". To make amends for the mix-up, the band posted "Annie Use Your Telescope" on their Myspace. A third EP, The Resolution EP, was released on September 23 as a Verizon and Rhapsody exclusive. It includes the songs "The Resolution", "Annie Use Your Telescope" and an acoustic version of "The Resolution". The music video for "The Resolution" was released on September 29. It features McMahon performing the track, before being lured into the sea by the siren call of a mermaid. He attempts to resist, but ends up in the ocean. The Glass Passenger was made available for streaming through Alternative Press' website on September 29, before being released through Sire and Warner Bros. Records on September 30. (Note: McMahon wanted to release the album under his own name, since it was mainly about his struggle with cancer, but was persuaded against it by his manager and label. They told him that Jack's Mannequin had a sizeable fanbase, and that it would be like starting fresh. McMahon retorted: "Why the f--- not try again? And if it does or doesn't work, at least I know I got out in front of my s--- and I didn't try and hide behind something.") Every edition of the album features the bonus track "Miss California"; the Japanese edition also includes the bonus track "Doris Day". McMahon explained that while making "Miss California" he was not that impressed with it, but by the time it came to be mixed he highly enjoyed it, and included it as bonus track to not disrupt the sequencing.

The collectors edition CD/DVD combo includes a short film Choke, California, directed by James Minchin III. Fans who pre-ordered the album at The Bamboozle festival were given a lithograph, a digital download copy of the album, and a photobook. On October 2, the group performed "The Resolution" on The Tonight Show with Jay Leno. In late May, the band said they were looking for original fanart to include in the music video for "Swim". It was filmed the following month with director Steven Murashige. An unofficial video, shot by director Emilio Martinez, consisted of touring footage and was released on June 11 to hold fans over until the official video was completed. To promote Jack's Mannequin's appearance on tour with the Fray, the track was released as a single. The official video premiered through AbsolutePunk on July 21. McMahon said he wanted the official video to be about the human condition in general, rather than his own. Incorporating the fan art, the clip was turned into a "universal meditation on hope and perseverance." A deluxe edition of the album was released on March 23. It features the album, the In Valleys and The Ghost Underground EPs, along with additional live tracks and footage from touring. Independent label Music on Vinyl re-pressed the album on vinyl in November 2018; McMahon had spent the preceding year discussing a reissue of the release with his former label, who did not reciprocate interest.

== Touring ==
Jack's Mannequin performing during their club tour, November 2008

In February 2008, the band went on a US college tour, followed by an appearance at The Bamboozle festival in late May. In July, the band participated on the Warped Tour, before supporting Paramore on their headlining US tour in July and August. In October and November, the band went on a club tour in the US titled Hammers and Strings: An Evening with Jack's Mannequin and The Glass Passenger. During the tour, they performed The Glass Passenger in its entirety. The group was supported Eric Hutshinson, Fun and Treaty of Paris on select dates. In January 2009, the band performed a few shows in Japan, before appearing at Soundwave festival in Australia in February and March. Following this, the band performed two shows in both Germany and the UK, and then embarked on a tour of the US in April and May.

Dubbed the Father from the Earth tour, the band was supported by Matt Nathanson, Low vs Diamond and Erin McCarley. Before the tour took place, a number of dates in both April and May were cancelled initially without an explanation. Shortly afterwards, the band issued a statement mentioning they had received a tour offer from the Fray. McMahon said he was "very interested but had not wanted to reschedule shows" as presale tickets had been sold. However, when he learned Jack's Mannequin would be given a 60-minute support slot, it "gave [him] solace in the midst of a difficult decision." The cancelled shows were rescheduled with dates in the fall. Between mid-June and early August, the band toured with the Fray across the US. After this, the group appeared at the Reading and Leeds Festivals in the UK.

== Reception ==
Professional ratings
Aggregate scores
Source	Rating
Metacritic	63/100
Review scores
Source	Rating
AbsolutePunk	88%
AllMusic	3/5 stars
Alternative Press	4.5/5 stars
Entertainment Weekly	C+
Melodic	5/5 stars
PopMatters	5/10 stars
Rock Sound	7/10
Rolling Stone	3.5/5 stars
Spin	3/5 stars
Sputnikmusic	4/5

The Glass Passenger debuted at number eight on the Billboard 200 having sold 49,000 units in its first week. It also reached number two on Digital Albums, number three on Alternative Albums and Top Rock Albums, and number 10 on the Top Tastemaker Albums chart. "The Resolution" charted at number 27 on Alternative Songs and number 28 on Triple A Songs. "Swim" charted at number 34 on the Adult Top 40 chart.

The Glass Passenger received generally favorable reviews from critics, according to review aggregation website Metacritic. Melodic reviewer Andrew Ellis said McMahon had successfully followed Transit with a record that was "similar, yet somehow different" than his past work. Though he mentioned it might not "seem as initially compelling" as Transit, the "glorious" melodies were clear evidence that the band surpassed the sophomore slump "with flying colours". Annie Zaleski of Alternative Press noted that it was considerably "more complex and sophisticated" than Transit, writing that a person does not need to know McMahon's life story to "relate to and resonate with his music", which in turn makes it "a fantastic, special album".

AbsolutePunk staff member Drew Beringer said the album's "variety and diversity" removes it from Everything in Transit and other pop releases. He felt that both McMahon's lyrics and song structures "continue to get better" as he "cement[s] himself as the current scene’s best pop musician". Sputnikmusic emeritus Athom wrote that the majority of the tracks, despite being rooted in "typical pop-rock like broken hearts and separation", managed to pull off "as surprisingly personal". Though McMahon's lyrics "occasionally falter", they come across as "stronger than they've even been" in spite of his vocals "occasionally fall[ing] short". Rock Sound's Iain Moffat said McMahon did "a fine job ... exploring [mid-to-late-80s AOR with a] seldom-ploughed furrow". Erica Futterman of Rolling Stone referred to the album as "a candid portrait of survival", adding that McMahon "made a more honest album than many of his emo peers".

Entertainment Weekly's Jaya Saxena found the lyrics "often revealing" as McMahon comes across as "a bit bored" with him "forc[ing] clichéd metaphors into power ballads". Making it two-thirds into the album to "the genuinely heartfelt 'Hammers and Strings (A Lullaby)'", it's "too late; the ratio of cheese to sincerity is just too high". AllMusic reviewer Andrew Leahey wrote the album's introspective narrative "sometimes pales in comparison with the summery songs" featured on Transit. He added it may not contain pop hooks like those on Transit, but it "does stay afloat under the weight of McMahon's past, which bodes well for the songwriter's future work". PopMatters editor Evan Sawdey referred to the album as a "half-baked collection" of tracks which "lose sight" of McMahon's strengths to focus more so on a "grandiose sense of self-importance". He did note it featured "even more orchestral flourishes, towering choruses, and dramatic lyrics" than those that graced Transit. Spin writer Jon Young said the album "match[es] hyperemotional melodies" with McMahon's "tender voice on dramatic tracks".

== Track listing ==
All songs written by Andrew McMahon.

The Glass Passenger track listing
No.	Title	Length
1.	"Crashin"	4:06
2.	"Spinning"	2:53
3.	"Swim"	4:16
4.	"American Love"	3:43
5.	"What Gets You Off"	5:13
6.	"Suicide Blonde"	3:28
7.	"Annie Use Your Telescope"	3:08
8.	"Bloodshot"	3:58
9.	"Drop Out – The So Unknown"	3:33
10.	"Hammers and Strings (A Lullaby)"	4:34
11.	"The Resolution"	3:06
12.	"Orphans"	2:39
13.	"Caves"	8:19
Total length:		56:54

Standard edition bonus track
No.	Title	Length
14.	"Miss California"	3:54

Japanese edition bonus track
No.	Title	Length
15.	"Doris Day"	3:24

Deluxe edition bonus tracks
No.	Title	Length
15.	"Holiday from Real" (live from SIR)	3:48
16.	"Kill the Messenger" (live from Rock Xentral)	3:31
17.	"Cell Phone" (EP version)	3:58
18.	"Sleazy Wednesday" (EP version)	4:32
19.	"At Full Speed" (EP version)	3:43
20.	"Into the Airwaves" (live from Orlando)	6:01
21.	"Crashin" (live from Omaha)	4:03
22.	"Annie Use Your Telescope" (live from St. Louis)	3:37
23.	"I'm Ready" (live from New York City)	4:25
24.	"Last Straw, AZ" (live from Orlando)	4:05
25.	"Hammers and Strings" (live from Austin)	4:49
26.	"Dark Blue" (live from Del Ray Beach)	4:17
27.	"Kill the Messenger" (live from Idaho Falls)	5:05
28.	"The Resolution" (live from Boston)	3:17
29.	"La La Lie" (live from Del Ray Beach)	6:41
30.	"Behind the Scenes with Jack's Mannequin" (video)	12:04
Total length:		140:50

== Personnel ==
Personnel per booklet.

Jack's Mannequin

- Andrew McMahon – piano, lead vocals, keyboards (tracks 1–6, 8–9 and 11), B3 organ (tracks 2–5, 9, 11 and 13), kazoo (track 6), stomping (track 8), clapping (track 8), accordion (track 10), glockenspiel (track 12)
- Jay McMillan – drums (tracks 1–11 and 13), stomping (track 8), clapping (track 8)
- Bobby 'Raw' Anderson – guitar, background vocals (tracks 1–2, 4–9, 11 and 13), kazoo (track 6)
- Jonathan Sullivan – bass (tracks 1–11), talk box (track 6), upright bass (track 7), stomping (track 8), clapping (track 8)

Additional musicians

- CJ Eiriksson – drums (tracks 1, 6 and 8), programming (tracks 1–4, 6–9 and 11–12), tambourine (track 4)
- Stacy Clark – background vocals (tracks 1 and 2)
- Jim Wirt – background vocals (tracks 1–2, 4–5, 11 and 13), bass (track 4, 13), kazoo (track 6), additional vocals (track 8)
- P.J. Smith – background vocals (tracks 1 and 4)
- Patrick Warren – bells (track 1), additional keyboards (track 4), arrangement (track 4), Chamberlain (tracks 5, 7, 10–11 and 13), pump organ (track 10), effects (track 13)
- Max Coane – additional percussion (track 1), programming (track 12)
- Grooveline Horns – horns arrangement (track 4)
- Fernando Castillo – trumpet (track 4)
- Raul Vallejo – trombone (track 4)
- Carlos Sosa – saxophone (track 4)
- Aaron Dixon – additional guitar (track 12)
- Chris Rezanson – additional programming (track 4)

Production

- Andrew McMahon – producer
- Jim Wirt – producer
- CJ Eiriksson – co-producer, engineer
- Bobby 'Raw' Anderson – additional production
- Max Coane – additional engineering
- Neil Couser – additional engineering (track 5)
- Pete Martinez – additional engineering (track 6)
- Spencer Guerra – second engineer
- Adam Fuller – second engineer
- Grahm Hope – second engineer
- Clifton Allen – second engineer
- Alek Edmonds – second engineer
- Mat Camara – second engineer
- Nicholas Fournier – second engineer
- Jacob Sciba – second engineer
- Jared Dodd – second engineer
- Bobby Hunter – second engineer
- Jose Alcantar – second engineer
- Nik Karpen – second engineer
- Keith Armstrong – second engineer
- Chris Lord-Alge – mixing
- Ted Jensen – mastering
- Frank Maddocks – creative direction, design
- James Minchin III – photography

== Charts ==
Chart performance for Everything in Transit
Chart (2008)	Peak position
US Billboard 200	8
US Top Alternative Albums (Billboard)	3
US Digital Albums (Billboard)	2
US Top Rock Albums (Billboard)	3
US Indie Store Album Sales (Billboard)	10
