= Dust to Dust =

Dust to Dust is best known from the phrase "Earth to earth, ashes to ashes, dust to dust" from the funeral service in the Book of Common Prayer

It may also refer to:

== Film ==
- Dust to Dust (1938 film) or Child Bride, an exploitation film about child marriage
- Dust to Dust (1994 film), a Western starring George Eads
- Dust to Dust (2000 film), a Mexican film
- Dust to Dust (2002 film), a documentary made by the husband of Sandra Brown
- Dust to Dust: The Health Effects of 9/11, a 2006 documentary by Heidi Dehncke-Fisher
- Dust to Dust (2023 film), a Hong Kong film based on an actual robbery in China.

== Music ==
- Dust to Dust (Heavenly album), a 2004 album and a track on the album
- Dust to Dust (Pete Nice and DJ Richie Rich album), a 1993 album and a track on the album
- Dust to Dust, a 2001 Hilmar Örn Hilmarsson album
- "Dust to Dust", a song on 1999 album Famous Monsters by The Misfits
- "Dust to Dust", a song on the 1996 album Skold by Tim Skold
- "Dust to Dust", a song on the 1984 album Jesus Commands Us to Go! by Keith Green
- "Dust to Dust", a track on the soundtrack to Final Fantasy XIII by Masashi Hamauzu
- "Dust to Dust", a 2013 song by The Civil Wars
- "Dust to Dust", a song on the 2018 album Queen of the Murder Scene by The Warning
- "Dust to Dust", a song by John Kirkpatrick, entirely in the Locrian mode

== Other media ==
- Dust to Dust (novel), a 2000 novel by Tami Hoag
- Dust to Dust (comic), a 2010 prequel to the novel Do Androids Dream of Electric Sheep?
- "Dust to Dust" (Babylon 5), a 1996 episode of Babylon 5
- "Dust to Dust", a 1989 episode of War of the Worlds
- 30 Days of Night: Dust to Dust, a 2008 miniseries
- "Dust to Dust", the final mission in the Call of Duty: Modern Warfare 3 campaign mode

== See also ==
- Return to Dust (disambiguation)
- Ashes to Ashes (disambiguation)
