= Dark Blue (song) =

Single by Jack's Mannequin

from the album Everything in Transit
- Released: June 27, 2006
- Recorded: 2005
- Genre: Alternative rock; emo
- Length: 4:14
- Label: Maverick Records
- Songwriter(s): Andrew McMahon
- Producer(s): Jim Wirt

Jack's Mannequin singles chronology
| "The Mixed Tape" (2005) | "Dark Blue" (2006) | "The Lights and Buzz" (2005) |

"Dark Blue" is the second single by Jack's Mannequin from their first studio album, Everything in Transit. In May 2013, nearly eight years after its 2005 release, "Dark Blue" went gold.

== Song ==
When interviewed by Suburban Horror, McMahon stated that the song was his favorite from the Everything In Transit album.

It was as the last song I wrote on the record. I always find that my favorite song is the last one that I worked on. I think that song for me sums up the record in a lot of ways. I wrote it to do that...

== Music video ==
The music video was directed by Brett Simon, and features a traditional 1950s dance marathon. The video begins with an ecstatic crowd competing in the marathon with the band playing the song in the centre of the gazebo. It then proceeds to show the crowd growing steadily exhausted, with many contestants disqualified for falling down. Observers take bets on who will win the competition. As the video draws to a conclusion and there are only two couples remaining, the girl of couple 55 slumps to the ground and they place second. The winning couple is cheered by a large crowd, while couple 55 are escorted to the edge of the ship by a pair of guards. They then proceed to jump from the edge.

== In popular culture ==
- The song was played live in an episode of One Tree Hill.
- Stephenie Meyer included the song in the inspiration playlist for her novel Breaking Dawn, the fourth installment of her widely popular Twilight series.
- The song also features in the trailer's for Andrew McMahon's documentary, Dear Jack. The documentary explores McMahon's battle with leukemia and was due to be released in late 2009.
- In May, 2013, almost 8 years after the single's original release in support of "Everything in Transit", Dark Blue achieved a gold certification by the Recording Industry Association of America.
- At the end of his 2025 romantic comedy, Things like This, Max Talisman sings a cover of the song.
