= My Racing Thoughts =

Single by Jack's Mannequin

from the album People and Things
- Released: July 29, 2011
- Genre: Alternative rock Piano rock
- Length: 4:16
- Label: Sire
- Songwriter: Andrew McMahon
- Producers: Jim Scott, Rob Cavallo, and Andrew McMahon

Jack's Mannequin singles chronology
"Swim" (2009)	"My Racing Thoughts" (2011)	"Release Me" (2012)

"My Racing Thoughts" is the first studio single from the album People and Things by Jack's Mannequin. It was made available as a digital single on iTunes and Amazon on August 2, 2011.

== Music video ==
An official video was released for "My Racing Thoughts" on September 30, 2011, along with 10 other videos, with a video for each of the 11 songs on People and Things. The video for My Racing Thoughts was directed by Anders Rostad.

== Personnel ==
"My Racing Thoughts" personnel adapted from the CD liner notes

Jack's Mannequin

- Andrew McMahon – Vocals, Piano, Percussion, Keyboards
- Bobby "Raw" Anderson – Guitar, Background vocals
- Jay McMillan – Drums, Percussion
- Tim Pierce - Guitars
- Jamie Muhoberac - Keyboards, B3
- Chris Chaney - Bass
- Patrick Warren - Keyboards

Production

- Nigel Lundemo - Pro Tools Engineering
- Ted Jenson - Mastering at Sterling Sound
- Steve Rea and Russ Waugh - Assistant Engineers
- Chris Lord-Alge - Mixing at Mix LA
- Cheryl Jenets - Production Manager

Art

- Patrick Conception - Illustrations
- Conception Studios - Art Direction

Music Video

- Anders Rostad - Music Video Director
- Dylan VanDam - Music Video Producer
- Jesse Springer - Music Video Director of Photography
