= The Lights and Buzz =

Single by Jack's Mannequin

from the album Kevin & Bean's Super Christmas
- Released: November 15, 2005
- Recorded: October 12, 2005 at 4th Street Recording (Santa Monica, California)
- Genre: Alternative rock
- Length: 3:35
- Label: Maverick
- Songwriter(s): Andrew McMahon

Jack's Mannequin singles chronology
"Dark Blue" (2005)	"The Lights and Buzz" (2005)	"La La Lie" (2006)

"The Lights and Buzz" is a song by Jack's Mannequin. It was released on November 15, 2005, as a music download exclusively through the iTunes Store. In 2006, the song appeared as a bonus track on the Japanese version of Jack's Mannequin's debut album Everything in Transit, as well as on Kevin and Bean's Super Christmas. It was also remastered for the 10th anniversary edition of Everything in Transit.

It is the first song frontman Andrew McMahon wrote and recorded after his stem cell transplant in connection with his leukemia diagnosis in late 2005. The song's lyrics are heavily influenced by his recovery from the disease, indicated in lines like "I'm coming home from my hardest year" and "It's good to be alive".
