= Return to Dust =

Return to Dust may refer to:

- Return to Dust (film), a 2022 Chinese film by Li Ruijun
- Anodyne 2: Return to Dust, a 2021 video game
- Love Is Love/Return to Dust, a 2012 album by Code Orange Kids

== See also ==
- Dust to Dust (disambiguation)
