= Tami Hoag =

American novelist (born 1959)

- Born: Tami Mikkelson; January 20, 1959 (age 67); Cresco, Iowa, U.S.
- Occupation: Novelist
- Writing career
- Language: English
- Period: 1988–present
- Genres: contemporary romance, suspense
- Website: www.tamihoag.com

Tami Hoag (born Tami Mikkelson; January 20, 1959) is an American novelist, best known for her work in the romance and thriller genres. More than 22 million copies of her books are in print.

== Biography ==
Hoag was born in Cresco, Iowa and raised in the small town of Harmony, Minnesota, where her father sold insurance. From childhood, she knew she wanted to be a writer. "I had to spend a lot of time entertaining myself," she told an interviewer in 2016. "I found books at a really young age and fell in love with books."

Hoag's first job after graduating from high school was in the La Crosse Tribune circulation department. Before publishing her first novel, she also worked as a photographer's assistant, trained show horses, and sold designer bathroom accessories. She married and divorced Daniel Hoag, whom she had dated in high school.

Hoag began her career as an author in 1988, writing category romances for the Bantam Books Loveswept Line. After several years of success in that field, Hoag switched her focus to single-title suspense novels. She has had thirteen consecutive New York Times bestsellers, including five in a 20-month span. Her novel Night Sins became a TV miniseries starring Valerie Bertinelli and Harry Hamlin. Hoag has been invited to do a reading at one of Barbara Bush's literacy functions.

Hoag and three other authors who made the leap from romance to thrillers at roughly the same time (Eileen Dreyer, Elizabeth Grayson, and Kimberly Cates) have formed a group they call the Divas. The group provides support and encouragement for each other, and Hoag often thanks them in the acknowledgement section of her books.

Hoag owns horses, and often goes for a ride to combat writer's block. She has competed in dressage at a national level, but stopped competing after breaking five vertebrae in her back during a fall while trying out a horse for a friend. Hoag fully recovered from her accident, and has returned to the competition arena. As of 2012, she was living in Malibu, California, and Wellington, Florida.

== Bibliography ==
=== Standalone novels ===
- McKnight in Shining Armor (1988, Loveswept #276), (2009) Reissue
- Mismatch (1989, Loveswept #315), (2008) Reissue
- Sarah's Sin (1991, Loveswept #480)
- Heart of Dixie (1991, Loveswept #493), (2008) Reissue
- Taken by Storm (1992, Loveswept #532), (2007) Reissue
- Still Waters (1992, Bantam Fanfare)
- The Last White Knight (1992, Loveswept #561)
- Dark Paradise (1994, Bantam Books)
- Kill the Messenger (2004, Bantam Books)

=== Oak Knoll series ===
- Deeper than the Dead (2009)
- Secrets to the Grave (2010)
- Down the Darkest Road (2011)

=== Elena Estes series ===
- Dark Horse (2002)
- The Alibi Man (2007)

=== Kovac & Liska series ===
- Ashes to Ashes (1999)
- Dust to Dust (2000)
- Prior Bad Acts (2006) also known as Dead Sky
- The 1st Victim (2013, an e-book short story)
- The 9th Girl (2013)
- Cold Cold Heart (2015, Dutton)
- The Bitter Season (2016)

=== Deer Lake series ===
- Night Sins (1995)
- Guilty as Sin (1996)

=== Doucet series ===
- The Restless Heart (1991, Loveswept #458), (2007) Reissue
- Lucky's Lady (1992)
- Cry Wolf (1993)
- A Thin Dark Line (1997)
- The Boy (2018)
- Bad Liar (2024)
- Dark Side (TBC)

=== Hennessy series ===
- The Trouble with J.J. (1988, Loveswept #253), (2009) Reissue
- Magic (1990, Bantam Fanfare, also in The Rainbow Chasers series)

==== Lynn Shaw ====
- Straight from the Heart (1989, Loveswept #351), (2007) Reissue
- Last White Knight (1992, Loveswept #561), (2008) Reissue

=== Quaid Horses series ===
- Rumor Has It (1989, Loveswept #304), (2009) Reissue
- Man of Her Dreams (1989, Loveswept #331) (2008) Reissue
- Tempestuous (1990, Loveswept #434), (2007) Reissue

=== The Rainbow Chasers series ===
- Heart of Gold (1990, Loveswept #393), (2010) Reissue
- Keeping Company (1990, Loveswept #405), (2010) Reissue
- Reilly's Return (1990, Loveswept #417), (2010) Reissue
- Magic (1990, Bantam Fanfare, also in the Hennessy series)

=== Non-fiction ===
- "The Contemporary Heroine: A Woman for Our Time" essay in North American Romance Writers (1999, ISBN 0810836041)

== Sources ==
- Kean, Danuta. "Tami Hoag Author Profile". Orion Publishers. Archived from the original on 2005-01-19.
- Richards, Linda L. (April 1999). "Tami Hoag". January Magazine.
