= Treaty of Paris (band) =

- Origin: Chicago, Illinois, United States
- Genres: Pop rock, alternative rock
- Years active: 2005–present
- Labels: Airport Tapes and Records (2007-2008)
- Spinoff of: Empyrean
- Members: Michael Chorvat; Phil Kosch; Dan Wade; Chris Insidioso; Brandon Capetillo
- Past members: Danny Prasil; Scott Hoeft; Brandon Capetillo; Nick Fonzi

Treaty of Paris is an American rock band from Chicago, Illinois. The band consists of five members: Phil Kosch (guitar), Dan Wade (guitar/vocals), Brandon Capetillo (bass/vocals), Chris Insidioso (drums) and Michael Chorvat (vocals, guitar, tambourine).

== History ==
Treaty of Paris formed in January 2005 when Michael Chorvat, Dan Wade, Scott Hoeft, and Brandon Capetillo of the local Chicago band Empyrean recruited Phil Kosch from the local Chicago band Saraphine. The name Treaty of Paris was originally a fake name the band used at their first show with Kosch in order to downplay the fact that he was leaving his current band. They decided to keep the name because it was easy to remember. Hoeft would later leave the group and was replaced by Chris Insidioso from Chicago hardcore group Rollo Tomasi. Their first release was the EP Behind Our Calm Demeanors, released in September 2005. Tracks from Behind Our Calm Demeanors received significant airplay in Chicago, and the EP sold well locally. The group toured the US extensively over the next two years.

In 2006, the band toured extensively throughout the U.S., opening for Ludo and Quietdrive and self-releasing an acoustic EP titled "Handclaps Revisited."

Teaming up with Andrew McMahon of the bands Something Corporate and Jack's Mannequin, the group recorded their full-length debut, Sweet Dreams, Sucker, in Burbank, California. The album was released on McMahon's label on September 25, 2007. The band followed the release with an opening slot on The Spill Canvas' fall 2007 tour.

Between March 12, 2007, and September 30, 2007, the band participated in Q101's Breaking the Band, in which they began to get local and national attention. Their single, "Waking Up The Dead", has gained international attention from its odd and popular music video, featuring the band members getting mysteriously kidnapped and transported to a secret location by giant woodland creatures.

In the spring of 2008, bassist Brandon Capetillo left the band and was replaced by Nick Fonzi on bass guitar, who also ended up leaving the band in April 2010 and was replaced by longtime pal Alex Maier.

The band toured with Yellowcard in the spring of 2008 and spent the summer and early fall touring with The Pink Spiders, The Frantic, and Straylight Run. Treaty of Paris performed on the Warped Tour between June 20 and June 29, 2008. They toured with Jack's Mannequin and Fun on a North American tour in the Fall of 2008.

In 2008, the band was released from its contract with Airport Tapes and Records after its dissolution.

In 2009, the band has been writing and recording new songs, which have been said to be in the direction of their more pop-friendly material.

In 2010, the band released at their 'homecoming" show in Chicago at the Metro, "Currents" in which when performing the show, Mike Chrovat dedicated the song Currents to his beautiful mother who had died the morning of the show but as told by Mike Chorvat, "She had to be here with us tonight." "She and my dad have always been very supportive."

== Discography ==
- Behind Our Calm Demeanors EP (2005)
- Handclaps Revisited Acoustic EP (2006)
- Sweet Dreams, Sucker (2007)
- Currents EP (2010)
