= Ashes to Ashes (novel) =

Novel by Tami Hoag

- First edition
- Author: Tami Hoag
- Language: English
- Genre: Mystery, thriller
- Publisher: Bantam Books
- Publication date: 1999
- Publication place: United States
- Media type: Print (hardback & paperback)
- Pages: 592
- ISBN: 0-553-57960-6
- OCLC: 44591308
- Followed by: Dust to Dust

Ashes to Ashes is a 1999 crime/thriller novel written by Tami Hoag. It is the first novel in the Kovac/Liska Series.

== Synopsis ==
A serial killer known as "The Cremator" is killing sex workers in Minneapolis parks and setting their bodies on fire. When one of his victims turns out to be the daughter of a local billionaire, and a homeless teenager claims to have witnessed the burning, it brings together former FBI agent Kate Conlan (now working as a victim-witness advocate) and the Bureau's top serial-killer profiler, John Quinn.

== Reception ==
Kirkus Reviews praised Hoag's ability to "juggle a complex plot" but warned that the graphic violence may not appeal to some readers. Publishers Weekly noted the crisp dialog and engaging love scenes, and praised her for "granting a humanizing dignity to the victims' corpses".

Booklist also reviewed Ashes to Ashes.
