= Ashes to Ashes (video game) =

1996 video game

- Developer: Deep River Publishing
- Publisher: Corel Corporation
- Platform: Windows
- Release: 1996

Ashes to Ashes is a 1996 video game from Corel Corporation.

== Gameplay ==
Ashes to Ashes: Feeding the Fires of War! is a game in which players enter a 22nd-century world where global disputes are settled through open-air battles led by professional warriors. The player plays as a lone gunman deployed into sprawling outdoor arenas—ranging from deserts and swamps to lunar landscapes—tasked with eliminating hostile mercenaries. Each level involves straightforward objectives: eliminate all enemies, collect three "evil brains" from fallen foes, and progress to the next stage. There are 50 levels across eight arenas, emphasizing sheer combat over puzzles or narrative depth. Gameplay combines shooter mechanics with features like 3D terrain modeling and vehicle hijacking. As the player advances, they will encounter increasingly tactical landscapes—valleys and plateaus that allow for scouting and strategic defense. The player can commandeer five types of enemy vehicles, including assault cycles for mountain traversal and tanks for brute-force confrontations. These vehicles offer different weapons and movement styles, encouraging adaptive play in diverse environments. Combat is largely run-and-gun, driven by picking up power-ups and clearing out waves of bio-armored foes and mechanized threats.

== Development ==
The game was developed by Deep River Publishing, a company based in Portland, Maine.

== Reception ==
Reception

Review scores
Publication	Score
Computer Games Magazine	2/5
GameSpot	5/10
GameStar	17%
PC Joker	14%
PC Player	15/100
PC Gamer	25%
PC Zone	2.5/10

GameSpot said "The demo is worth a look, and a $20 price would make the game a reasonable buy. In the end, however, here is a perfect candidate for diminished stardom in the bargain bin".

PC Gamer said "If you've any interest at all in first-person games, stick with the accomplished masters, Duke or Quake. In the meantime, let's hope there's a Rosetta stone of gaming that can somehow unlock the mysteries of the first-person genre and put an end to this nonsense".
