= Kill the Messenger (novel) =

2004 thriller by Tami Hoag

- First edition
- Author: Tami Hoag
- Language: English
- Genre: Thriller novel
- Publisher: Bantam Books
- Publication date: July 2004
- Publication place: United States
- Media type: Print (Hardcover, Paperback)
- ISBN: 0-553-58358-1
- OCLC: 64433233

Kill the Messenger is a suspense thriller by author Tami Hoag. The hardcover edition of the novel was first published in July 2004. In March 2006 the book was released in mass market paperback. That same month the paperback edition rose to No. 1 on The New York Times Best Seller List, No. 3 on the Top New Books List published in Canada's National Post, and No. 4 on the USA Today Best Seller List.

== Plot summary ==
Bike messenger Jace Damon attempts to live under the radar in Los Angeles with his younger brother (Tyler, who has an IQ of 168). The two are raised by their mother, who does her best to remain anonymous. When she falls ill Jace takes her to the hospital, making sure that he is not associated with her. The mother dies, and her children cannot claim her body. Instead, Jace takes his brother to find a new place, deciding that the Chinese community would be the best for them; eventually an elderly Chinese businesswoman (Madame Chen) takes a liking to the pair of boys and gives Jace a part-time job and a place to stay. He also takes a job as a bike messenger, since he can be paid in cash for it.

One night, Jace accepts a delivery just as he is about to go off-duty; it is a pickup from the office of one of L.A.'s sleaziest defense attorneys, Lenny Lowell. He is not happy about the late delivery since it is a wet miserable night, but the dispatcher tells him that everyone else has gone off duty, and he is the only one available. Lowell is extremely (despite his reputation) nice to Jace, giving him a good tip. When Jace approaches the delivery address, he finds an empty lot which makes him nervous, so he decides to abort the delivery. Before he can get away, a large black car comes racing towards him to run him down. He barely survives the collision and is forced to abandon his bike. On foot, he is able to elude his pursuer, but loses his delivery bag (but retains the package). Jace returns to the scene of the collision and is relieved to discover that he will only have to replace the wheel. He returns to Lowell's office, only to find it crawling with police; he learns that Lowell has been murdered. Jace does not trust police, so he leaves the scene.

In a city fueled by money, celebrity and sensationalism, the slaying of a bottom-feeder like Lowell won't make headlines. So when LAPD's elite show up, homicide detective Kev Parker (assigned to Lowell's case) wants to know why. Parker begins a search for answers that will lead him to a killer—or to the end of his career. Because if there's one lesson Parker has learned over the years, it's that in a town built on fame and fantasy, delivering the truth can be murder.
