= Ashes to Ashes (film) =

1999 British film by Wayne Gerard Trotman

- DVD cover
- Directed by: Wayne Gerard Trotman
- Release date: 1999
- Running time: 90 minutes
- Country: United Kingdom

Ashes to Ashes is a 1999 action film by British independent filmmaker Wayne Gerard Trotman. The producers, Red Moon Productions Limited claim that Ashes to Ashes is the first British homegrown martial arts movie and a tribute to 1970s cinema. The film is characterized by a complex script, unpredictable twists, dark humour and a subversion of received political correctness. Ashes to Ashes premiered at the Raindance film festival where it was described as "Kung fu with an arty London twist".

== Plot ==
Ashes to Ashes is set in London, England. The film is a surreal journey into the dreams and misadventures of Gabriel Darbeaux, a young screenwriter and martial arts enthusiast who supplements his income by escorting wealthy women. We are introduced to Gabriel's character as he is chased and cornered by a group of Triad thugs armed with swords, sticks and nunchaku. Using his own nunchaku Gabriel manages to fight off the thugs, only to find that the whole episode was an early morning dream. The dream provides inspiration for the opening scene of his latest screenplay entitled "Ashes to Ashes", a thriller involving the Italian Mafia, Chinese Triads and a generous amount of martial arts action. While Gabriel believes that the success of this script will give him financial independence, his best friend Michael has plans of setting up his own escort agency. To fund this project, he resorts to making secret recordings of his sexual encounters with a banker's wife and hopes to earn £100,000 through blackmail. Gabriel receives a call to meet with one of his regular clients at an exclusive restaurant in the West End of London. The woman fails to show and instead Gabriel encounters the beautiful Arabella Simone, who draws him into a world which is disturbingly similar to that featured in his screenplay. Arabella is the former mistress to Valentino Tarantola, a possessive Italian gangster who employs "Laundrymen" Muhammed and Nelson to do his dirty work. When Valentino is apparently castrated and left for dead at Arabella's apartment, she runs to Gabriel for help with the "Laundrymen" close on her tail. Michael is called in to drive the two to a main line station from where they plan to take a train to France. Unfortunately, before the trio get very far, they are captured by the "Laundrymen" and taken to a warehouse where they are introduced to Enrico Tarontola, Valentino's sadistic younger brother. Bound and gagged, they are forced to listen helplessly as Enrico accuses Arabella of castrating and killing his brother Valentino and Michael of blackmailing his financial advisor's wife. All three, including Gabriel are to be put to a violent death. Without warning, henchmen of a rival Triad boss storm the warehouse. In the ensuing battle, Gabriel is forced to fight for his life against Triad enforcers and Mafia hitmen. The film ends with Gabriel waking from a violent dream, blurring the distinction between dream, reality and the fictional account that Gabriel is writing.

== Themes ==
=== The late 1960s and early 1970s ===
In an interview, director Wayne Gerard Trotman admitted that Ashes to Ashes was a tribute to the raw style of 1970s blaxploitation, gangster and martial arts movies. There are clear references to popular personalities of the era such as Bruce Lee and Muhammad Ali. The film was clearly produced on a low budget and this may have been deliberately emphasised with old fashioned sound effects and extreme close up shots of fighters screaming. The fight scenes are not the slick wire-enhanced set pieces so commonplace in contemporary martial arts films but are down and dirty. There are no flashy techniques just quick, effective street fighting reminiscent of Bruce Lee's The Big Boss, Fist of Fury and Way of the Dragon. Other examples of references to 60s and 70s films and television include:

- the character Leo, who sports an afro hairstyle similar to that of Jim Kelly in Enter the Dragon and Black Belt Jones
- a sexual encounter inspired by a scene in Little Big Man where Faye Dunaway is particularly vocal
- references to The Drunken Master, Captain Kirk and Mr. Spock
- a line inspired by Bonnie and Clyde: "My name is Muhammed Armen, my associate is Mr. Kong, we kill people."
- the use of percussion and drumrolls in the soundtrack evocative of Bruce Lee's Fist of Fury

=== Sex and sexism ===
The dangers of unprotected sex are mentioned during a conversation between Michael and Gabriel where it is revealed that one of their escort colleagues has been diagnosed as having AIDS. Gabriel suggests that Michael's sexual activities with his clients are similar to a game of Russian roulette and Michael reacts adding that he never goes "diving without a rubber suit" - a reference to condoms. The character Michael Trent is particularly sexist. He warns Gabriel to "Never trust a woman" and suggests that all women are deceitful and generally views his female clients with contempt. This contempt is made quite apparent during sex with the banker's wife Felicity. Michael blindfolds her and can barely contain his laughter as he uses a vibrator on her. Later Michael is seen listening to a recording of his exploits in bed with Felicity and laughing uncontrollably. The Chinese gangster Nelson, suggests that a woman was used to poison Bruce Lee as this was the only way he could be killed. Valentino Tarantola treats Arabella as no more than a sex object. Having knocked her unconscious he is seen unzipping his trousers presumably as a prelude to having non-consensual sex. Valentino's brother Enrico, is similarly contemptuous to both Arabella and Felicity.

=== Racism ===
Ashes to Ashes features a cosmopolitan cast and the story involves a certain degree of racial tension between the diverse cultures to be found in London. For instance even though Nelson (Asian) and Muhammed (Black) are partners in crime, both are quite willing to make comments which the other may find offensive. Nelson mentions "Big hamburger eating Americans" going to Vietnam and being beaten by Vietnamese grandfathers. Muhammed responds by suggesting that the Vietnamese didn't have to deal with the likes of Muhammad Ali, Frazier and Foreman (all Black American boxers) a provocative suggestion of a belief in the superior physical prowess of Black men over both Asian and White men. Nelson gives no quarter claiming that Chinese martial artists would use "qi" (pronounced "chi" a reference to qigong) to defeat their bigger Black opponents. He also refers to Muhammed as "Black bean". Muhammed on the other hand makes a reference to Nelson's "Little yellow arse".

While being tortured by the "Laundrymen" including Raymond Kong, Nelson's younger brother, Boss Cheng accuses Raymond in Cantonese of betraying his own people (the Chinese) to serve the "round eyes". When approached by an Italian gangster speaking Italian and broken English after stumbling into a Mafia boss's Mercedes-Benz, a drunk Cockney lad abusively states "You foreigners, you come to this country and you don't speak English." He is immediately set upon and soundly beaten. In an interview, the director Trotman claims that this scene was inspired by something that he actually witnessed on a London Underground train platform. A drunk White male approached two female Japanese tourists who claimed not to understand what he was saying. The drunk responded by swearing at the tourists and making a remark similar to the one used in the film. Trotman claims to have been incensed by what he saw which not only had an element of racism but also displayed the arrogance that some English speakers have. He says what was very likely is that the Japanese tourists pretended not to be able to speak any English in the hope that the drunk man would just go away and leave them alone. This contempt towards other language speakers is further illustrated by Michael's question "What sort of bad people… people who don't speak English?"

=== Violence ===
The character Gabriel, played by Wayne Gerard Trotman claims "Violence doesn't bother me". The film involves scenes of electroshock torture, burning, gunplay, fights with baseball bats and sticks and Trotman's character Gabriel uses nunchaku to strangle and knock his opponents senseless. In one scene Muhammed has a telephone conversation with his wife whilst a Mafia boss is being beaten and interrogated. Trotman claims to have gained inspiration from a story of a recording of a casual telephone conversation between Pablo Escobar and his wife discussing family matters whilst screaming could be heard in the background. In an interview he claimed to want to illustrate the contradiction that many violent individuals display.

During a telephone conversation, Muhammed rebukes his 6-year-old son for hitting his younger sister. Meanwhile, in the background, two young men deliver brutal punches to the face of an elderly man. When he speaks to his wife, Muhammed suggests that watching too much Power Rangers may be responsible for his son practising karate on his baby sister and he further adds that the children may be misbehaving in an attempt to stay up late in order to watch Rambo – references to the possible ill effects of violence on young impressionable minds? For one reviewer, this scene and several others constituted padding which he viewed as a major flaw of the film.

=== Stereotypes ===
Ashes to Ashes is filled with stereotypes. Gabriel represents the ordinary guy reluctantly drawn into a violent and dangerous scenario. Arabella is your typical femme fatale escaping from the abusive Mafia boss who sends his henchmen after her. Nelson is your typical Triad enforcer with his exaggerated hot temper and broken English. In a departure from the clear stereotypes Muhammed is seen reading The Daily Telegraph, a popular British newspaper considered to lean to the right of the political arena.

== Cast ==
- Gary Cameron as Muhammed Armen
- Jason Ninh Cao as Nelson Kong
- Keith McCoy as Michael Trent
- Tessa Brown as Arabella Simone
- Cecil Cheng as Dennis Cheng
- Olivia Carruthers as Felicity Wood
- Chris Gabriel as Valentino Tarontola
- John Garcia as Enrico Tarontola
- Leighton Young as Donny Lau
- Logan Wong as Raymond Kong
- S. Toby Aldenhoven as Leo
- Giuseppe Nicotra as Mimmo
- Andy Nguyen as Ming
- Claudine Sinnett as Emma

== Cultural references ==
One reference to Quentin Tarantino is in the name Valentino Tarantola.

The names Gabriel and Michael are of angels mentioned by name in the Christian Bible. Felicity says to Michael "You're an angel, my angel" and later Gabriel says to Arabella "Gabriel is no ordinary angel, he's a kick ass angel". Enrico makes several references to Satan - the fallen angel, during his monologue to the captured Arabella.

There are many references to popular films and television including:

- Enter the Dragon
- Drunken Master
- Power Rangers
- Rambo
- Star Trek
- Thunderbirds
- Bonnie and Clyde

== Editing ==
A major plot point in the original script which was not developed in the film was that the "property" referred to by the gangsters was in Arabella's bag when she arrived at Gabriel's apartment.

The character of Michael is seen laughing uncontrollably as he listens to an audio recording he secretly made of a sexual encounter with a wealthy female client. Whilst listening to the tape he watches television. Trotman's short film London: Metropolis of the Future is being shown on the television.

Sirens and alarms are used throughout the film. Police sirens are heard in the background of almost all the scenes featuring the "Laundrymen" Nelson and Muhammed. When Michael is having sex with Felicity we hear a fire engine siren in the background and when Gabriel asks Arabella if Valentino is in the Mafia we hear a burglar alarm in the background.

Trotman edited the film alone, during a three-month period. Whilst editing the film, he suffered a retinal detachment in his right eye that almost resulted in a permanent loss of sight.

== Articles and reviews ==
- Impact Magazine – April 2006 ... Mike Leeder
- Irish Fighter Magazine – March 2006 ... Rob Corwell
- Digit Magazine – March 2000 ... Matthew Bath
- Video Age Magazine – December 1999 ... Graeme Aymer
