= Dust to Dust (novel) =

2000 novel by Tami Hoag

- First edition
- Author: Tami Hoag
- Language: English
- Genre: Mystery, Thriller novel
- Publisher: Bantam Books
- Publication date: 2000
- Publication place: United States
- Media type: Print (hardback & paperback)
- ISBN: 0-553-58252-6
- OCLC: 43903772
- Preceded by: Ashes to Ashes
- Followed by: Prior Bad Acts

Dust to Dust is a 2000 novel by Tami Hoag. It is the second novel in the three part Kovac/Liska Series.

== Plot ==
Andy Fallon, Internal Affairs cop and son of police legend, "Iron" Mike Fallon, is found hanging nude in his bedroom, facing a mirror with the word "sorry" printed on it. Was it a suicide, an erotic accident, or murder? Sam Kovac and Nikki Liska, two of Minneapolis' toughest detectives are told to exploit the case, call it an accident and move on. But Kovac isn't convinced and when Iron Mike is found dead a few days later, another apparent suicide, Kovac and Liska stop listening to the brass, put their careers on the line and start their own investigation. As they begin to dig, they uncover cover ups, a connection to a twenty-year-old case and a killer who wants to keep the secrets of the past dead and buried.
