= Everything in Transit =

Studio album by Jack's Mannequin
- Released: August 23, 2005
- Recorded: 2004–2005
- Studios: 4th Street; Rock Central; NRG; Sound City
- Genres: Pop rock, power pop
- Length: 41:19
- Label: Maverick
- Producers: Jim Wirt, Andrew McMahon

Jack's Mannequin chronology
Everything in Transit (2005)	The Glass Passenger (2008)

Singles from Everything in Transit
- 1. "Holiday from Real" Released: May 10, 2005; 2. "The Mixed Tape" Released: July 19, 2005; 3. "Dark Blue" Released: June 27, 2006; 4. "La La Lie" Released: November 2006

Everything in Transit is the debut studio album by American rock band Jack's Mannequin. Amid rising tensions within Something Corporate, the band went on a break; returning to his home in Orange County, California, frontman Andrew McMahon began working on a new project with producer Jim Wirt. Tracking commenced at 4th Street Studios in California, with additional recording done at other studios. Towards the end of the sessions, McMahon signed with major label Maverick Records; tracking was presumed finished in late 2004. McMahon began playing shows with Jack's Mannequin in early 2005; the group embarked on six-week tour, which coincided with the single release of "Holiday from Real".

With the recording and inclusion of "Dark Blue", the album was pushed back to early August. McMahon began suffering from chronic fatigue and laryngitis; in the following days, he was diagnosed with acute lymphoblastic leukemia. Over the next two months, McMahon was admitted to hospital, underwent two rounds of chemotherapy (in between which he contracted pneumonia), and had a bone marrow/stem-cell transplant from his sister Katie. "The Mixed Tape" was released as a single in mid-July; an animated music video was made later that month. After two delays, Everything in Transit was eventually released on August 23.

McMahon spent the next two months recovering at his parents' house before going in remission in October and played his first show since his diagnosis in December. He started promoting the album with a few late-night talk show appearances, before supporting O.A.R. on their US tour; "Dark Blue" was released as a radio single in June to coincide with the trek. They embarked on a headlining US trek in September and October, followed by a supporting slot for Panic! at the Disco on their US arena tour, which was promoted with the release of "La La Lie". Another headlining US tour followed in February and March 2007, leading to a performance at The Bamboozle festival.

Everything in Transit is a concept album centred around McMahon's return to California and the demise of a long-standing relationship. Removed from the musical style of Something Corporate, it is a pop rock and power pop record, influenced by pop albums from the 1960s and 1970s, specifically the Beach Boys' Pet Sounds (1966). Everything in Transit received a positive reception from critics, with a few praising McMahon's lyrics. It sold over 22,000 copies in its first week, charting at number 37 on the Billboard 200 as a result. As of August 2008, it had sold over 250,000 copies. Celebratory reissues were released on the album's 5th and 10th anniversaries; the latter was supported with a tour.

== Background ==
In the early 2000s, Andrew McMahon was the frontman for pop punk act Something Corporate. He had recorded and toured with the band since high school, releasing three albums. As a result, he spent little time at home. During some downtime in December 2003, McMahon wrote "Locked Doors", a track that differed from the group's usual style. He recorded it himself in a studio, which he found an enlightening experience. McMahon tracked 17 demos at The Jungle Room, with most of their themes centered around his family and his upbringing. McMahon sent them to Something Corporate collaborator Jim Wirt, who singled out "Holiday for Real". The pair spent two days in a studio working on that and "Locked Doors". Something Corporate went on a co-headlining US tour with Yellowcard in March and April 2004 and supported the Offspring on an Australian tour in June. Unable to work together, the band members' relationships became strained. They discussed recording another album. Despite having a batch of songs already written, McMahon thought the idea sounded "terrifying". The group was also facing pressure from the music industry, and a number of things were disrupting the otherwise friendly atmosphere between band members. Concerned that a new album would feel forced, and they had reached the point of burning out, the band decided to take a break to recuperate.

After returning home to Orange County, McMahon spent some time with his friends and family, and frequented local eateries. McMahon wrote material on his Something Corporate touring piano that he had moved into his bedroom. He would often wake up in the middle of the night and write songs. McMahon and Wirt began working on a project ultimately titled Jack's Mannequin, with McMahon handling the writing, and the pair playing all the instruments. McMahon toyed with the idea of calling it The Mannequins, but was tired of bands beginning with "the". He got the word "mannequin" from a random conversation, and at the same time he had finished a song entitled "Dear Jack"; he joined the two names. McMahon threw himself into the project, claiming he worked harder on it than he did with Something Corporate. He rarely slept or ate, and was typically wasted for over half a day at a time. Within a few months, he stockpiled dozens of songs, which were influenced by Southern California's landscape and atmosphere. Though he had no plan to release the songs, he intended to record them.

== Production ==
The main tracking occurred at 4th Street Studios in Santa Monica, California, with engineer CJ Eiriksson. McMahon financed the recording sessions with over $40,000 of his own funds, and co-produced the album with Wirt. Eiriksson and Neil Couser, who served as an additional engineer and engineered "La La Lie", handled Pro Tools. McMahon felt protective of the recording environment and was cautious about how many people were in the studio. He wanted to "do and say exactly what was on [his] mind", and only brought in people after the tracks were mostly completed. A few of McMahon's friends contributed to the recordings: Wirt (vocals, bass and guitar), Something Corporate guitarist Bobby Anderson (guitar), session musician Patrick Warren (organ, strings and arrangements) and Mötley Crüe member Tommy Lee (drums). During this time, McMahon did session work for Hidden in Plain View and Lee. McMahon heard through mutual business associates that Lee enjoyed North. One night Lee invited McMahon to work with him.

The drum tracks were made up of samples by Eiriksson, recorded by Scott Humphrey and Chris Baseford at The Chop Shop. When McMahon realized he need an actual drummer, Lee was brought in and tracked drums in a single day. The samples were then mixed with Lee's drums; Eiriksson and Jay McMillian also played drums during the sessions. Additional recording was done at three studios with extra engineers: Rock Central Studios with engineer Josey Alcantar; NRG Studios with Eiriksson and assistant engineer Dave Colvin; and Sound City Studios with assistant engineer Peter Martinez. Terry Wilson and Brian Coffman contributed to the recordings, the former playing sitar on "Kill the Messenger", and the latter with guitar on "MFEO" and "Into the Airwaves". After tracking six songs, McMahon felt it formed an entity separate from Something Corporate and became determined to release it.

McMahon was talking to manager, expressing concern that he didn't want to release the project with major label Geffen Records, who Something Corporate was signed to. His manager got him out of his contract with Geffen; the pair later met with two record labels. He approached major label Maverick Records three quarters of the way through the recording process and signed with them. They gave him a handheld video camera to videotape the remaining sessions intending to use clips for online promotion. Initially, he simply said what he intended to do in the studio on the given day, but it evolved into a dialogue on how his day went. After finishing the initial track listing, McMahon showed the album to his label. An A&R representative suggested adding one more song; instead, he went back and reworked the track listing, adding two songs in the process: "La La Lie" and "Into the Airwaves". Apart from a brief two-week tour with Something Corporate in November 2004, recording was reportedly finished in December, until "Dark Blue" was recorded in May 2005. The recordings were then mixed by Chris Lord-Alge. An outtake from the sessions, "Cell Phone", was later recorded for The Glass Passenger (2008).

== Composition ==
=== Themes and music ===
Everything in Transit is a concept album that details McMahon's return to his hometown, which he left to pursue a career in music. McMahon wrote the material during a dark period of self-exploration in his life impacted by Something Corporate's hiatus and the ending of a long relationship with Kelly Hansch caused in part by his career pursuit. (The pair would later reconcile and marry.) Throughout the album, there are references to becoming sick and being hospitalized. McMahon mentioned the lyrics are about recovering from his frequent touring with Something Corporate, which he compared to recovering from an illness of sorts. He realized the best way to get the material out of himself was to put the lyrics against an ideology of hope. Much of Something Corporate's material was written when McMahon was 16–17 years old during various make-up-and-break-ups. For Everything in Transit, he thought he found real love, and had decided to put the relationship on hold in an attempt to find himself.

Musically, the album has been classed as pop rock and power pop, abandoning the pop punk style of Something Corporate. When working in a band, decisions are often made democratically as a collective. Working on the project alone allowed McMahon to write the song he could hear in his head. He tried shaping the album after some of his favorite records—the Beach Boys' Pet Sounds, Weezer's Weezer and Tom Petty's Wildflowers. He also listened to electronic pop acts such as the Killers, the Faint and TV on the Radio, as well as David Bowie and Madman Across the Water (1971) by Elton John. Many elements of the Beach Boys are found on the album, including the booklet featuring an autobiographical tale in the form of a storybook inspired by Pet Sounds. It reignited McMahon's love of pop music and his interest in crafting a record that was unashamedly pop. He subsequently began listening to a lot of pop albums from the 1960s and 1970s that he considered better than his own material. After partially reconnecting with Southern California, he used the landscape's sounds as a backdrop for a few of the tracks. There are audio clips throughout the album that McMahon captured during the recording sessions on his handheld camera.

=== Songs ===
"Holiday from Real" opens with barely audible sounds of seagulls, beaches and traffic, before moving into a bass slide. McMahon talks about arriving home and being viewed as a visitor in his own world against the backdrop of Los Angeles. He wrote "The Mixed Tape" about making the perfect mixtape for his girlfriend. The track starts with a chord progression being played by partial distorted guitar, before McMahon's vocals come in. "Bruised" includes a drum machine, and was compared to Straylight Run with McMahon's upbeat vocal take; it talks about handling the loss of leaving a partner. "I'm Ready" opens with a spoken-word introduction, prior to full-band instrumentation kicking in. A crescendo starts after the first verse, but instead of building to a chorus, it goes to the next verse. It talks about accepting real life and being willing to move on in the face of adversity. The song features a tongue-in-cheek monologue, sounding like a journal entry, about the annoyance of putting on new clothes every day. It was one of the earliest tracks written for the project, written about guitarist William Tell leaving Something Corporate and McMahon's break up with Hansch. During the choruses sections of "La La Lie", McMahon is accompanied by backing vocals singing the track's title. The bridge section features McMahon yelling "Yeah! Yeah! Yeah!", followed by harmonica and guitar solos.

"Dark Blue" was written on a college campus stage and out of all the songs, it had the most similarity to Something Corporate; it became the last song recorded for the album. The song's lyrics were completely re-written from the original draft, which included the placeholder lyric "I'm black and blue". As it was the last song, McMahon was initially unsure what to talk about. It then became the album's centrepiece, with McMahon explaining: "...all of a sudden I knew what the story was, and I was having these crazy dreams about tidal waves and the characters ... became this story about this massive storm coming and sweeping us off into the water." "Miss Delaney" is about a girl based in Seattle, Washington that helped McMahon through a rough period in his life; it has a theremin reminiscent of the one heard on the Beach Boys' "Good Vibrations". "Kill the Messenger" talks about leaving someone you care about as it's for the better. "MFEO" is a two-part track—part one is "Made for Each Other"; the second part is "You Can Breathe". The first part is a piano-and-synth-centred track about McMahon analyzing his place in the world; the second part eventually fades out and concludes with his commentary about the making of the album and his need to purchase more videotape. McMahon said he put the track as the closer "because it spells out an over all philosophy. It definitely is in line with who I am, and what I believe". "Into the Airwaves" was compared to "The Astronaut" from Something Corporate's Leaving Through the Window.

== Release ==
=== Initial promotion and McMahon's leukemia ===
After touring with Something Corporate in January and February 2005, McMahon began playing shows with Jack's Mannequin in March and debuted material from the project. McMahon's backing band, named the Mannequins, consisted of Anderson and Jacques Brautbar on guitar, Jon Sullivan on bass and Jay McMillan on drums. Anderson studied music with Sullivan at Virginia Commonwealth University; Sullivan had been friends with McMillan for a few years. Promotion started when the band performed at South by Southwest, around which time they began releasing music. On April 17, Jack's Mannequin's debut album was announced for release in the coming summer through Maverick Records. Another announcement followed four days later, revealing the album's title, Everything in Transit, and the release date of July 12. In May, the group embarked on a six-week tour to build up hype for the album. On May 10, "Holiday from Real" was released as a 7" vinyl single, featuring two versions of "Kill the Messenger" (the album version and an acoustic version) as B-sides. On May 20, two songs were made available for streaming through the band's Myspace account. Two days later, it was announced the album's release date was pushed back to August 9 as "Dark Blue" was written and recorded for inclusion on it.

Around this time, McMahon started feeling sick while on tour, suffering from chronic fatigue and laryngitis. On May 25, he contacted his doctor, who said he should cancel the following night's show as he could face permanent damage to his voice. He met with his doctor who ran some blood tests after seeing McMahon's pale complexion. Two days later, during a mastering session for the album, McMahon received a phone call. His doctor said he needed a blood transfusion. He checked in to the Presbyterian Hospital in New York City, where he was sent directly to the leukemia ward. McMahon spent the next few days waiting for the results of a bone marrow sample taken from his hip. On June 1, he was diagnosed with acute lymphoblastic leukemia. All upcoming tour dates with both Jack's Mannequin and Something Corporate were postponed indefinitely. He flew to Los Angeles and was admitted to the UCLA Medical Center and underwent a first round of chemotherapy. With a lot of time in hospital, McMahon listened to the album and decided to re-sequence it.

As he was at an unusual age to get cancer, there was a debate whether to put him on an adult regimen or a vigorous pediatric treatment. He decided on the adult regimen as the hospital was part of a clinical trial that was testing it. McMahon contacted the label and advised them while he would be unable to promote the album until he was completely healthy, they should go ahead with its August 9 release date. As a result of multiple rounds of chemotherapy, his white blood cell count was almost at zero, and coupled with a weak immune system he contracted pneumonia. His white blood cell count eventually increased, and he decided to undergo a stem-cell transplant, rather than the longer and painful process of bone-marrow grafting. The chemotherapy could have potentially lasted several years if he had been unable to receive a transplant. McMahon said the prospect of "waiting three years to put out a record that was so personal and immediate to me ... was just not an option to me."

On July 3, McMahon was released from hospital and returned home to Los Angeles. (Note: Alternative music news website AbsolutePunk organized a charity wristband fundraiser to help offset the cost of McMahon's medical bills, with some proceedings being donated to the Pediatric Cancer Research Foundation.) On July 8, the album's release date was pushed back a further two weeks to August 23 in an attempt to give the album more traction prior to its release. "The Mixed Tape" was released as a single on July 19. In late July, a music video was filmed for "The Mixed Tape". On August 3, McMahon began preparations for a bone marrow transplant. On August 18, the animated music video for "The Mixed Tape" was released. It was directed by Michael Perlmutter and Full Tank, and was filmed while McMahon was being treated in hospital. Watercolour-esque paintings are seen throughout the clip, changing from a pastoral countryside to a dense forest to a city and then outer space. Shots of McMahon were interlaced over the animation. After finding out his sister Katie was an eligible donor, he went through a second round of chemotherapy before receiving the stem-cell transplant on the same day the album was released. (Note: While undergoing treatment, McMahon did not have the opportunity to write much music. He did manage to finish to the song "There, There Katie". Done as a thank you gift to his sister, McMahon and the rest of Something Corporate recorded a version of it for her.) The transplant revitalized his immune system. The iTunes version of the album included "Lonely for Her" as a bonus track.

=== Recovery and later promotion ===
McMahon spent the following months recovering at his parents' house. He met with his doctor weekly to check his blood count, and had to use testosterone patches because the chemotherapy had reduced his testosterone levels. "The Mixed Tape" was released to radio on September 20. McMahon contracted a prolonged bout of shingles, before eventually going into remission in October. The shingles subsided by December; he played his first two concerts since his diagnosis later that month. By January 2006, he was still on some medication, but was almost completely healthy. During that month, McMahon performed "The Mixed Tape" on an episode of One Tree Hill, where Hilarie Burton's character holds a benefit concert. While filming the episode in Wilmington, North Carolina, a second music video was filmed for "The Mixed Tape" with director Jay Martin. In the clip, McMahon delivers a package to Burton's house containing a mixtape and a flier for a Jack's Mannequin show. Burton's character finally listens to the tape and goes to the show. The band eventually played "The Mixed Tape" and "Dark Blue".

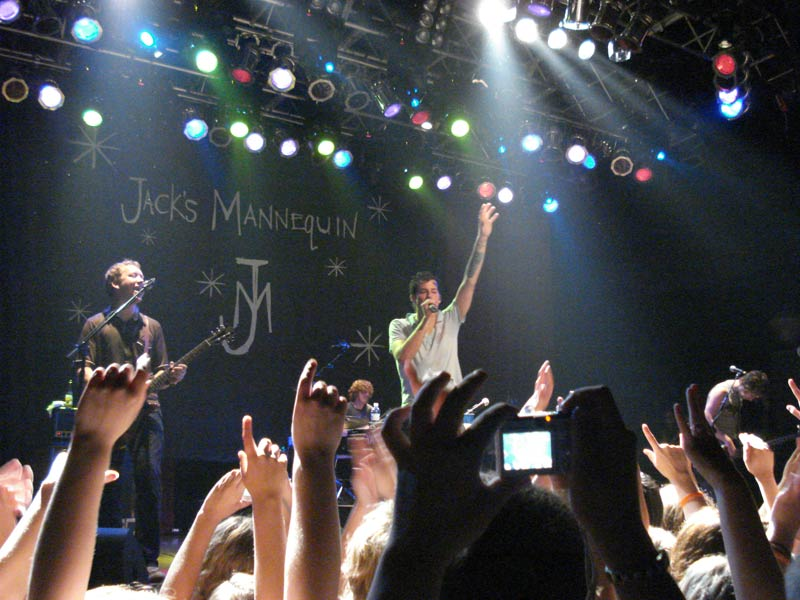
Jack's Mannequin performing during a support tour for O.A.R., July 2006

Following this, he appeared on Jimmy Kimmel Live!, The Late Late Show with Craig Ferguson and Last Call with Carson Daly. He slowly started performing one-off shows with his backing band in California, before eventually going on a short five-date tour out of the state in March. "Dark Blue" was released to radio on June 27. Between June and August, Jack's Mannequin supported O.A.R. on their headlining US tour. In early July, he finished taking the last of his prescribed medicine. Later that month, filming for a music video for "Dark Blue" began, before wrapping in August. The video, directed Brett Simon, was released on September 21. Inspired by They Shoot Horses, Don't They?, the clip features a dance marathon in 1950s Venice. In September and October, the band went on the Tour for a Cure, with support from Copeland, the Hush Sound and Daphne Loves Derby. Proceeds of the tour went to cancer research for the 15–22 age group. Following this, they appeared at the Bamboozle Left festival. Everything in Transit was re-released on November 7, featuring a DVD of live performances, music videos for "The Mixed Tape" and "Dark Blue", and interviews.

In November and December, the band supported Panic! at the Disco on their US arena tour. To promote Jack's Mannequin's appearance on the tour, "La La Lie" was released as a single. In February 2007, the band went on their first headlining tour, dubbed The West Coast Winter Tour. They toured the US with support from Head Automatica and The Audition. They extended this tour into March, with support from The Audition and We Are the Fury. Following this, the band appeared at The Bamboozle festival. McMahon contributed an acoustic version of "Bruised" to Punk Goes Acoustic 2, and an early version of "La La Lie", dubbed the West Coast Winter version, to Punk the Clock Volume Three. The constant touring over the preceding 14 months resulted in McMahon suffering mental exhaustion and physical fatigue. His management said: "The extensive travel has taken a toll on his mind and body ... [we believe] that it is in his, and his fans', best interest for him to be home so that he can regain his strength." As a result, tour dates in October were cancelled.

== Reception and legacy ==
Professional ratings
Review scores
Source	Rating
AbsolutePunk	95%
AllMusic	4/5 stars
IGN	7.2/10
Melodic	3.5/5 stars
The Morning Call	3/5
PopMatters	5/10 stars
Sputnikmusic	5/5 stars
Ultimate Guitar	10/10
Yahoo! Music	Favorable

=== Critical response ===
Everything in Transit received positive response from music critics. AbsolutePunk staff member Rohan Kohli wrote that the album explored the "complete emotional spectrum, taking you along on a journey that will make you both smile and cry," in some cases on the same track. He said McMahon's "impassioned" lyrics "really take the songs to an entirely different level." Sputnikmusic staff member SowingSeason considered the release perfect for "lazy, sunny afternoons when the sky is blue [and] the seagulls are flying around in a frenzy." Despite finding "nothing completely out of the ordinary," there was an "endearing sense of personality that permeates" every track so that listeners might find themselves gravitating to them immediately.

Ultimate Guitar said McMahon's phenomenal "meaningful" lyrics help the listener to create "a set of vivid pictures and moods in [their] head." Overall, they wrote that it had "three ingredients" that make a good record: "very well-crafted music, intelligent lyrics with sense and emotions. Plus it's very well put together." AllMusic reviewer Stephen Thomas Erlewine noted that while it was not far removed from what McMahon was doing with Something Corporate, the album "sounds truer to his artistic inclinations" than any of that band's releases. Though he added it "really shouldn't work ... [an album] delivered by an emo songwriter, backed by an aging metalhead, and co-produced by a guy who gave Hoobastank hits."

JR of IGN viewed the record as "mature, studied, delicate, and memorable," but felt it "drags, at times ... both sonically and thematically." Melodic reviewer Kaj Roth also found it similar to Something Corporate, and called it "very catchy and infectious." The Morning Call's John J. Moser considered it "a heck of a record ... The disc is so intelligent and complex ... it well may be beyond mass acceptance." PopMatters writer David Bernard viewed the album's melodies as being its strongest trait, "sav[ing] it from mediocrity"; he felt "the album could achieve much more." He added that around a third of the tracks were "in need of revisions, [but] perhaps the most troubling aspect ... is that a collection of songs about such a personal episode can sound so blandly general."

=== Commercial performance, subsequent events and releases ===
Everything in Transit debuted at number 37 of the Billboard 200, selling over 22,000 copies in its first week of release. By August 2008, it had sold over 250,000 copies. The Orange County Register ranked the album number one on their best local releases of 2005 list, and number 28 on the best albums of the 2000s list. Rock Sound ranked it at number 116 on the list of best albums in their lifetime.

After going through his illness McMahon became aware of the effects cancer was having on young adults and founded The Dear Jack Foundation in July 2006. It acts as a non-profit charity to raise funds for cancer research. Footage of the recording sessions, and McMahon's diagnosis and subsequent recovery was released as part of the documentary film Dear Jack in November 2009. Everything in Transit was re-pressed on vinyl in December 2010 and included an a cappella version of "Holiday from Real" and the West Coast Winter version of "La La Lie" as bonus tracks. McMahon performed the record in its entirety in 2014 as part of the Cultivate Festival. A 10th anniversary edition of the album, which includes bonus tracks, was released in October 2015. This version charted at number six on the Vinyl Albums and number 40 on the Catalog Albums charts. Following this, the group performed the album in its entirety on tour in December 2015 and January 2016. "Dark Blue" was certified gold by the Recording Industry Association of America in January 2016; Everything in Transit was certified Gold in August 2021.

== Track listing ==
All songs written by Andrew McMahon.

Everything in Transit track listing
No.	Title	Length
1.	"Holiday from Real"	2:58
2.	"The Mixed Tape"	3:14
3.	"Bruised"	4:02
4.	"I'm Ready"	3:55
5.	"La La Lie"	3:54
6.	"Dark Blue"	4:11
7.	"Miss Delaney"	3:44
8.	"Kill the Messenger"	3:24
9.	"Rescued"	3:56
10.	"MFEO - Pt. 1: Made for Each Other / Pt. 2: You Can Breathe"	8:01
Total length:		41:19

Standard edition bonus track
No.	Title	Length
11.	"Into the Airwaves"	4:07

Japanese edition bonus track
No.	Title	Length
12.	"The Lights and Buzz"	3:36

iTunes bonus track
No.	Title	Length
12.	"Lonely for Her"	3:22

10th anniversary edition bonus disc
No.	Title	Length
1.	"The Lights and Buzz" (2015 remastered)	3:36
2.	"Kill the Messenger (live from Rock Xentral)" (2015 remastered)	3:32
3.	"Meet Me at My Window" (2015 remastered)	3:50
4.	"Last Straw, AZ" (2015 remastered)	3:44
5.	"Lonely for Her" (2015 remastered)	3:25
6.	"Bruised (acoustic)" (2015 remastered)	4:29
7.	"Locked Doors" (2015 remastered)	3:53
8.	"I'm Ready (live from New York City)" (2015 remastered)	4:24

== Personnel ==
Personnel per booklet.

Jack's Mannequin

- Andrew McMahon – piano, lead vocals, organ (tracks 2, 4 and 9), bells (track 2), harmonica (track 5), keyboards (tracks 6 and 8), hand percussion (track 6), Wurlitzer (track 10)

Additional musicians

- Jim Wirt – guitar (tracks 1, 7 and 9), bass (tracks 1–11), backing vocals (track 3)
- Patrick Warren – Chamberlin (tracks 1–3 and 9–10), Moog (tracks 4–5 and 7), Melodica (track 5), accordion (track 5), samples (track 9), organ (track 10) string and horn samples (track 10)
- CJ Eiriksson – programming (tracks 1–3, 5 and 7–11), drums (track 9)
- Bobby "Raw" Anderson – guitar (tracks 2–10), backing vocals (tracks 3 and 5–6)
- Tommy Lee – drums (tracks 2–4, 8, 10 and 11)
- Jay McMillian – drums (tracks 5–6)
- Terry Wilson – sitar (track 8)
- Brian Coffman – guitar (tracks 10 and 11)

Production

- Jim Wirt – producer
- Andrew McMahon – producer, art direction, photos
- CJ Eiriksson – engineer (except track 5), Pro Tools
- Neil Couser – engineer (track 5), Pro Tools, additional engineering
- Scott Humphrey – drums recording (except tracks 1, 5, 6 and 9)
- Chris Baseford – drums recording (except tracks 1, 5, 6 and 9)
- Chris Lord-Alge – mixing
- Jose Alcantar – engineer
- Dave Colvin – assistant engineer
- Brian Reeves – recording, engineer
- Peter Martinez – assistant engineer
- Frank Maddocks – art direction
- Katherine Reka O'Connell – illustrations
- Wayne Robins – photos

== Charts ==
2005 chart performance for Everything in Transit
Chart (2005)	Peak position
US Billboard 200	37

2015 chart performance for Everything in Transit
Chart (2015)	Peak position
US Top Catalog Albums (Billboard)	40
US Vinyl Albums (Billboard)	6

== Certifications ==
Certifications for Everything in Transit
Region	Certification	Certified units/sales
United States (RIAA)	Gold	500,000^{‡}
^{‡} Sales+streaming figures based on certification alone.
