= Jack's Mannequin =

American rock band

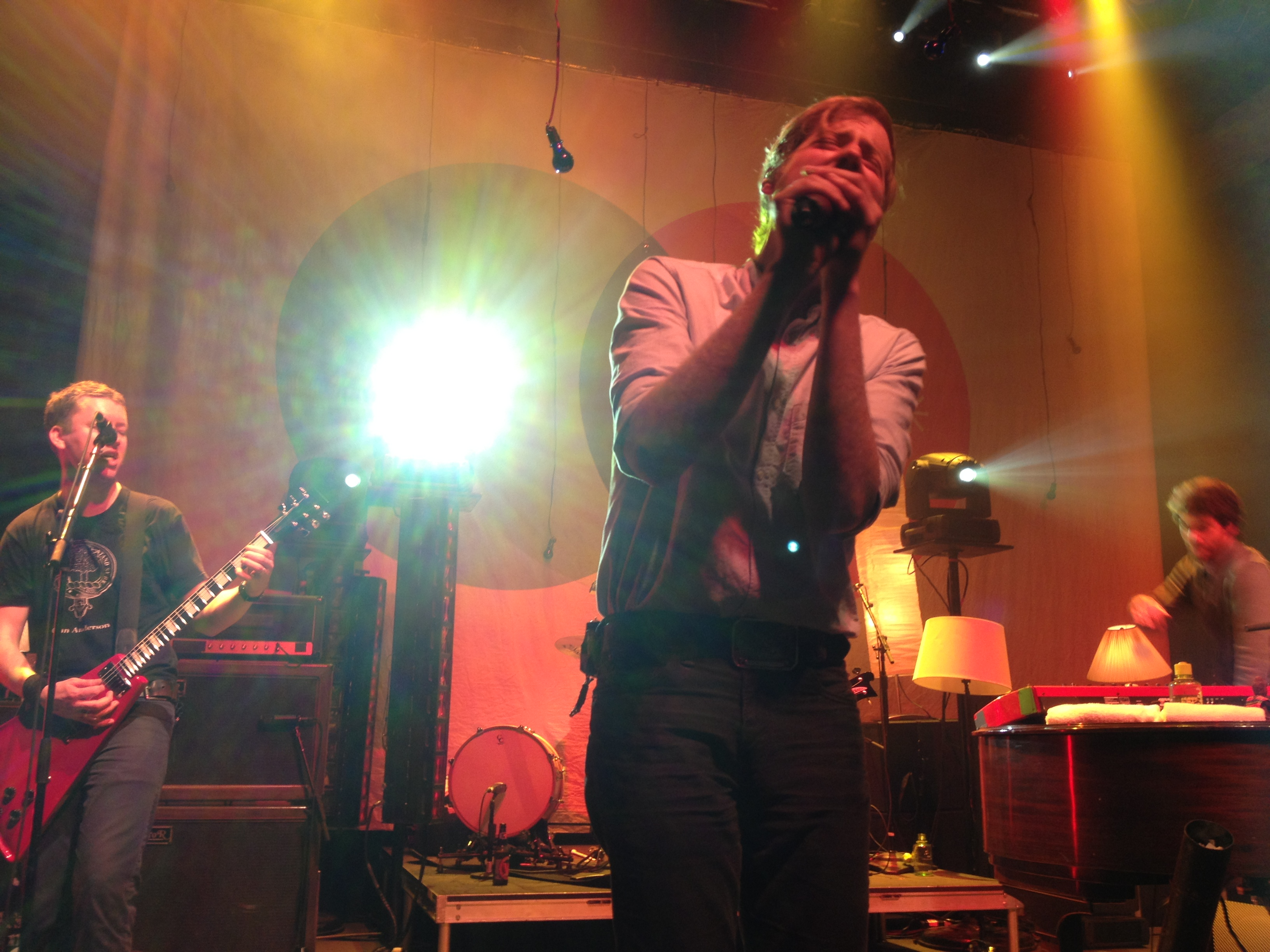
- Jack's Mannequin performing at the 9:30 Club in Washington, D.C. in 2012

Background information
- Origin: Orange County, California, U.S.
- Genres: Alternative rock; pop rock
- Years active: 2004–2012; 2015; 2024–present
- Labels: Maverick, Sire
- Members: Andrew McMahon; Bobby "Raw" Anderson; Jay McMillan; Mikey "The Kid" Wagner
- Past members: Jonathan 'Dr. J' Sullivan; Jacques Brautbar

Jack's Mannequin is an American rock band formed in 2004, hailing from Orange County, California. The band originally began as a solo project for Andrew McMahon, the frontman of Something Corporate.

The band was signed to Maverick Records and released Everything in Transit in August 2005, peaking at 37 on the Billboard 200. The Glass Passenger was released in 2008 on Sire Records, sold 49,000 copies in its first week, and peaked at number eight on the Billboard 200. People and Things was released October 4, 2011. Shortly afterward, it was announced that McMahon would discontinue releasing music under the name Jack's Mannequin, choosing to release music under his own name henceforth.

On November 30, 2015, McMahon announced that he would reunite Jack's Mannequin for a tenth-anniversary tour of Everything In Transit. The band has since reunited for shows in 2024 and 2025.

== History ==
=== Formation and Everything in Transit (2004–07) ===
Andrew McMahon began his musical career as the lead vocalist and pianist for the Orange County piano rock band Something Corporate. The primary impulse behind McMahon's solo project, Jack's Mannequin, was a song he recorded in December 2003 titled "Locked Doors". He felt the song had too different a style from previous Something Corporate material to be one of their songs. He realized that if he ever decided to release it, it would be on a solo album rather than a Something Corporate record. Exhausted from months of touring in late summer 2004, the band decided to take a temporary break. During his time off, McMahon laid down piano and vocal tracks for a song on Hidden in Plain View's Life in Dreaming and two songs on Tommy Lee's Tommyland: The Ride.

While Something Corporate's other songwriter and lead guitarist Josh Partington created a side project of his own called Firescape, McMahon started writing his own songs. He did not expect the songs to be released. McMahon took a more therapeutic approach in writing these songs, resulting in a more personal and intimate testament of his songwriting. McMahon stated in an interview that they dealt with "coming home, and having home be way different than I had remembered it ... abandoning a lot of people, and things, that I had normally been so attached to ... exploring and being okay with myself, and not having to make excuses for who I am, and accepting who I am." Although he just planned on recording these songs, they began to take shape collectively. He paid for the production out of his own pocket, which ultimately led to a record deal with Maverick Records.

He formed the band under the name Jack's Mannequin, which came to be after McMahon had considered the name "The Mannequins". However, after growing "bored of 'the' band names," he decided to sandwich it together with the title of a song he had completed for the record, "Dear Jack". Originally, there was said to be "not much significance behind the name," but upon McMahon's diagnosis of acute lymphoblastic leukemia, "the band name became ironic--considering the Jack I wrote the song for & ultimately named the project after, suffered from childhood leukemia."

Their first album, titled Everything in Transit, was released in August 2005 and received a positive response from fans and critics alike. A summer tour was scheduled to support the record release, but was canceled after McMahon was diagnosed with acute lymphoblastic leukemia and received a stem cell transplant from his sister Kate.

Music by Jack's Mannequin from Everything in Transit was featured in Season Three, Episode Fifteen of the TV series One Tree Hill. Hilarie Burton's character on the show, Peyton Sawyer, appeared in the music video for 'The Mixed Tape,' from Everything In Transit.

In May 2013, nearly eight years after its 2005 release, the track "Dark Blue" went gold. In August 2021, 16 years after its 2005 release, Everything In Transit went gold.

=== The Glass Passenger (2007–2009) ===
Jack's Mannequin performing at The Grog Shop in Cleveland, Ohio, November 10, 2008.

The band began recording their second album in the summer of 2007. In August 2007, McMahon posted the lyrics to the song "Cellular Phone" on his blog, which the band played live at several shows in 2007 and 2008. Also, in February 2008, videos of live performances of two songs off the record ("Caves" and "Suicide Blonde") were uploaded onto YouTube for public viewing. McMahon then appeared on the cover of the January 2008 issue of Alternative Press.

The album was entitled The Glass Passenger, and is a transcendent step-up, a catchy and listenable journey through McMahon's stories of love, life, and loss that moves from full-on upbeat rock ("Spinning") to melancholy introspection ("Annie Use Your Telescope.”) It was originally set for release on April 22, 2008, but the date was then tentatively set to June 3, and eventually released on September 30, 2008.

The Ghost Overground EP was released to iTunes on August 5, 2008. The EP contains two tracks from the second album, "The Resolution" and "Bloodshot", and two live tracks from Everything in Transit. Another EP, In Valleys, was released on iTunes on September 9, containing one song from the album, "Swim," and three b-sides, "Cell Phone", "Sleazy Wednesday", and "At Full Speed".

On August 28, 2008, in an interview with MTV, Andrew revealed that the author Stephenie Meyer had written the treatment for the music video for "The Resolution" and was set to direct it the following week. McMahon said of the filming, "It was a very cool shoot. Music videos are a tricky thing. They require a lot of trust in the team creating the visuals and that can be a little scary. That said, there was a great vibe on the set, and shooting by the water really made it an especially peaceful day, despite all the hard work that goes into it."

=== People and Things (2010–2011) ===
On September 28, 2010, it was announced bassist Jonathan "Dr. J" Sullivan left the band to pursue his other band, Kid Is Qual. McMahon stated, "Our dear friend, Dr. J, will be moving on to pursue new horizons with his band Kid is Qual. He will be sorely missed by us and the fans who have grown to love him, but we wish him great success on this new journey." Mikey "The Kid" Wagner was later announced as the band's new bassist.

In an Alternative Press article, Andrew revealed that he planned to return to the studio in Spring 2010 to record his third full studio album with Jack's Mannequin. According to a LiveDaily interview with Relient K's lead vocalist, Matt Thiessen, Thiessen contributed around four songs or so to this Jack's Mannequin album. 3 of these songs, "Amy, I", "People, Running", and "Platform Fire", were included on the album. This newest album was released on October 4.

McMahon debuted a new song titled "Restless Dream" during an acoustic tour in Australia in February 2011. This song, along with "Hey Hey Hey (We're All Gonna Die)", and "Platform Fire", which was debuted in late 2010, are on the new album.

On March 21, 2011, McMahon sent an email to his fans announcing a summer tour with Guster and revealing the title of Jack's Mannequin's third studio album: "In a perfect world we will be finished with Jack's third album, 'People and Things', by the end of this month."

On July 19, 2011, it was announced that People and Things would be released on October 4, 2011. The first single, "My Racing Thoughts", was released on August 2, 2011.

According to AbsolutePunk.net, McMahon had this to say about the new album, "I consider 'People and Things' a relationship record. My goal with many of the songs was to strip away the flowery language and sentiment attached to newer love and replace it with starker, less blinded language about more binding love. In the time following the last Jack's album the people in my world were moving in together, getting married, trying to find quote unquote 'real jobs' and reconciling new lives that looked a lot less like youth than some of us cared for. Marriage is a bit of a beast to tackle in a pop record but when I wrote 'My Racing Thoughts,' it became clear how powerful and loaded a subject this kind of love is and somewhere in that moment I began to lock into the broad concept for the writing sessions to come." In another (unrelated) interview, McMahon established "this album should be different than the previous few. The first (Everything In Transit) was about breaking up, the second (The Glass Passenger) was about getting sick and recovering from it. I hated that album at first, until we wrote this one (People and Things) and I then realized how proud I am of all of my work. This album will be much more 'cheery' than the last one(s)."

=== Retirement of name (2012) ===
On February 2, 2012, McMahon foreshadowed the end to the band.

On August 25, 2012, the Jack's Mannequin website redirected to andrewmcmahon.com, with McMahon decidedly putting out new music under his own name.

It was announced in September 2012 that Jack's Mannequin would perform their final show together at the 3rd Annual Dear Jack Benefit on November 11 in Los Angeles. The show sold out faster than any other show of McMahon's career, and because of this, an additional performance was added for November 12. Special guests for the shows included Jonathan "Dr. J" Sullivan, Jacques Brautbar, Matt Thiessen, and Stacy Clark. A recording of the show, Live from The El Rey Theatre, would be released in June 2013.

Soon after the final Jack's Mannequin show, McMahon would go on to continue making music and touring under the moniker Andrew McMahon In The Wilderness. The touring band for this solo project would initially feature Jack's Mannequin alum Jay McMillan and Mikey Wagner, and song from the Jack's Mannequin catalogue are regularly performed during a Wilderness set.

=== Reunions (2015–2016, 2024–2025) ===
Jack's Mannequin briefly reformed in late 2015 and into early 2016 for a mini-tour to celebrate the 10th anniversary of Everything in Transit, marking the first time the album had been played in its entirety. The tour, titled 10 Years in Transit, made 10 stops, with a line up of Bobby Anderson, Andrew McMahon, Jay McMillan, and Mikey Wagner, in addition to Andrew McMahon In The Wilderness member Zac Clark on keys.

In 2018, Bobby Anderson, now performing under the name Bob Oxblood, officially joined the touring Wilderness band. Oxblood had occasionally performed with both McMahon and the Wilderness band in the years since Jack's Mannequin disbanded. His joining reunited the final line up of Jack's Mannequin. As of 2025, the Wilderness touring line up consists solely of the final Jack's Mannequin line up, following the 2019 departure of Zac Clark and the 2022 departure of Morgan Paros. Jack's Mannequin reunited for a set during the inaugural "Andrew McMahon’s Holiday from Real Cruise", taking place in November 2024, featuring a line up of McMahon, Bob Oxblood, Mikey Wagner, and Jay McMillan. Zac Clark, Joe Ballero, and all members of Something Corporate joined in on various songs throughout the set.

On July 26, 2024, the band posted on Instagram that they will be performing at Ocean's Calling Second Wave on January 20, 2025, but the festival was ultimately cancelled.

On October 29, 2024, it was announced Jack's Mannequin would be performing at the 2025 edition of the When We Were Young Festival in Las Vegas.

On January 27, 2025, the "MFEO Tour" was announced as a celebration of the band's 20th anniversary, consisting of headlining and festival shows across the US, Canada, and Japan, along with supporting Mayday Parade during their leg of an Australian tour. The lineup is set to include McMahon, Oxblood, Wagner, and McMillan.

== Members ==
Final Line Up

- Andrew McMahon – lead vocals, piano, keyboards (2005–2012, 2016, 2024-)
- Bobby "Raw" Anderson – lead guitar, rhythm guitar, acoustic guitar, backing vocals (2005–2012, 2016, 2024-)
- Mikey "The Kid" Wagner – bass guitar, backing vocals (2010–2012, 2016, 2024-)
- Jay McMillan – drums, percussion (2005–2012, 2016, 2024-)

Touring members

- Zac Clark – keyboards (2016)

Former members

- Jonathan 'Dr. J' Sullivan – bass guitar (2005–2010)
- Jacques Brautbar – guitar (2005)

== Discography ==
=== Studio albums ===
Title	Album details	Peak chart positions				Certifications
Title	Album details	US	AUS Hit.	CAN	JPN	Certifications
Everything in Transit	Released: August 23, 2005; Label: Maverick	37	—	—	97	US: Gold
The Glass Passenger	Released: September 30, 2008; Label: Sire	8	19	—	29	
People and Things	Released: October 4, 2011; Label: Sire	9	—	57	130	
"—" denotes a recording that did not chart or was not released in that territory.

=== Video albums ===
Title	Details
Live from the El Rey Theatre	Released: June 25, 2013; Formats: CD/DVD/digital download; Label: Left Here Music

=== Singles ===
List of singles as lead artist, with selected chart positions, showing year released and album name
Title	Year	Peak chart positions						Certifications	Album
Title	Year	US	US AAA	US Adult	US Alt	US Rock	JPN	Certifications	Album
"The Mixed Tape"	2005	— (Note: "The Mixed Tape" did not enter the Billboard Hot 100, but peaked at number 24 on the Billboard Bubbling Under Hot 100 chart.)	—	—	—	—	—		Everything in Transit
"Dark Blue"	2005	—	—	—	—	—	—	US: Gold	Everything in Transit
"The Lights and Buzz"	2005	—	—	—	—	—	—		Non-album single
"La La Lie"	2006	—	—	—	—	—	—		Everything in Transit
"Cell Phone"	2008	— (Note: "Cell Phone" did not enter the Billboard Hot 100, but peaked at number one on the Hot Singles Sales chart.)	—	—	—	—	—		In Valleys
"The Resolution"	2008	— (Note: "The Resolution" did not enter the Billboard Hot 100, but peaked at number four on the Billboard Bubbling Under Hot 100 chart.)	28	—	27	—	—		The Glass Passenger
"Swim"	2009	—	—	34	—	—	—		The Glass Passenger
"Dear Jack"	2009	— (Note: "Dear Jack" did not enter the Billboard Hot 100, but peaked at number 40 on the Heatseekers Songs chart.)	—	—	—	—	—		The Dear Jack EP
"My Racing Thoughts"	2011	—	—	—	— (Note: "My Racing Thoughts" did not enter the Alternative Airplay chart, but peaked at number 23 on the Alternative Digital Song Sales chart.)	— (Note: "My Racing Thoughts" did not enter the Hot Rock & Alternative Songs chart, but peaked at number 23 on the Rock Digital Song Sales chart.)	68		People and Things
"Release Me"	2011	—	—	—	—	—	—		People and Things
"—" denotes a recording that did not chart or was not released in that territory.

=== EPs ===
- "Kill the Messenger" 7" vinyl (2005)
- The Free Holiday EP (Online Streaming) (2006)
- The Ghost Overground (iTunes Store Exclusive) (August 5, 2008)
- In Valleys (iTunes Store Exclusive) (September 9, 2008)
- The Resolution EP (Rhapsody/VCast Exclusive) (September 23, 2008)
- Live from SoHo EP (iTunes Store Exclusive) (March 10, 2009)
- The Dear Jack EP (iTunes Store Exclusive) (November 3, 2009)
- Everything in Transit: Strings Attached - EP (August 22, 2025)

=== Non-album tracks ===
- "Lonely for Her" – bonus track on the iTunes Store version of Everything In Transit (2005)
- "The Lights and Buzz" – released as a digital download on the iTunes Store (2005)
- "Meet Me at My Window" – released on Sound of Superman (2006)
- "Last Straw, AZ" – released online (2006)
- "Bruised (Remix)" – released on Snakes on a Plane: The Album (2006)
- "Bruised (Acoustic)" – released on Fearless Records' Punk Goes Acoustic 2 (2007)
- "God (feat. Mick Fleetwood)" – released on Instant Karma: The Amnesty International Campaign to Save Darfur (2007)
- "La La Lie (West Coast Winter version)"- released on Punk the Clock Vol. 3: Property of Gentlemen (2007)
- "Mr. Tambourine Man" – released on Chimes of Freedom: Songs of Bob Dylan Honoring 50 Years of Amnesty International (2012)
- "Wrecking Ball Heart" – released as a digital download on AndrewMcMahon.com (2012) as the final recording by Jack's Mannequin
