= Ghetto Fighters' House =

History and heritage museum in Israel

Coordinates: 32°57′38″N 35°05′43″E

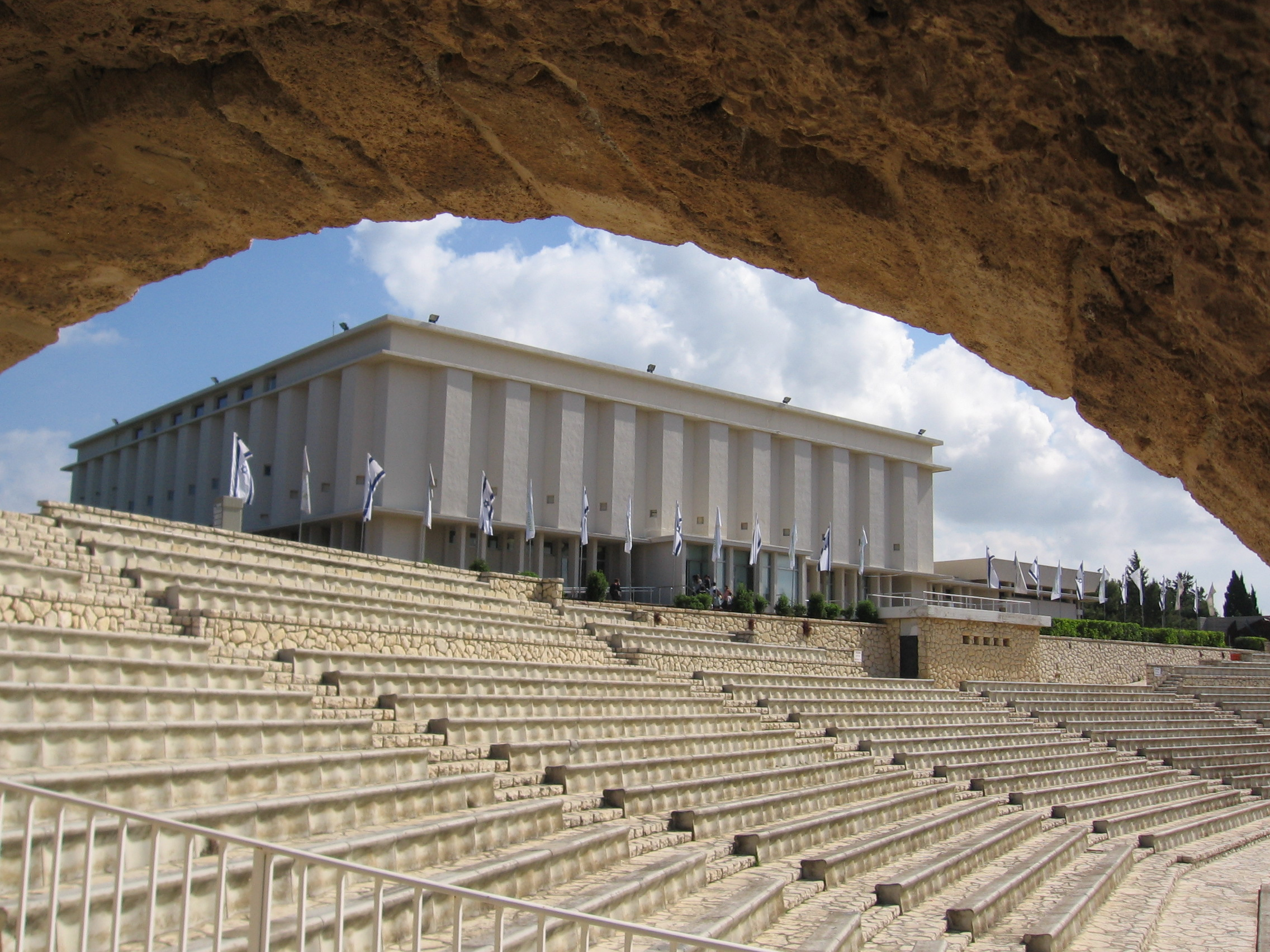
Ghetto Fighters' House

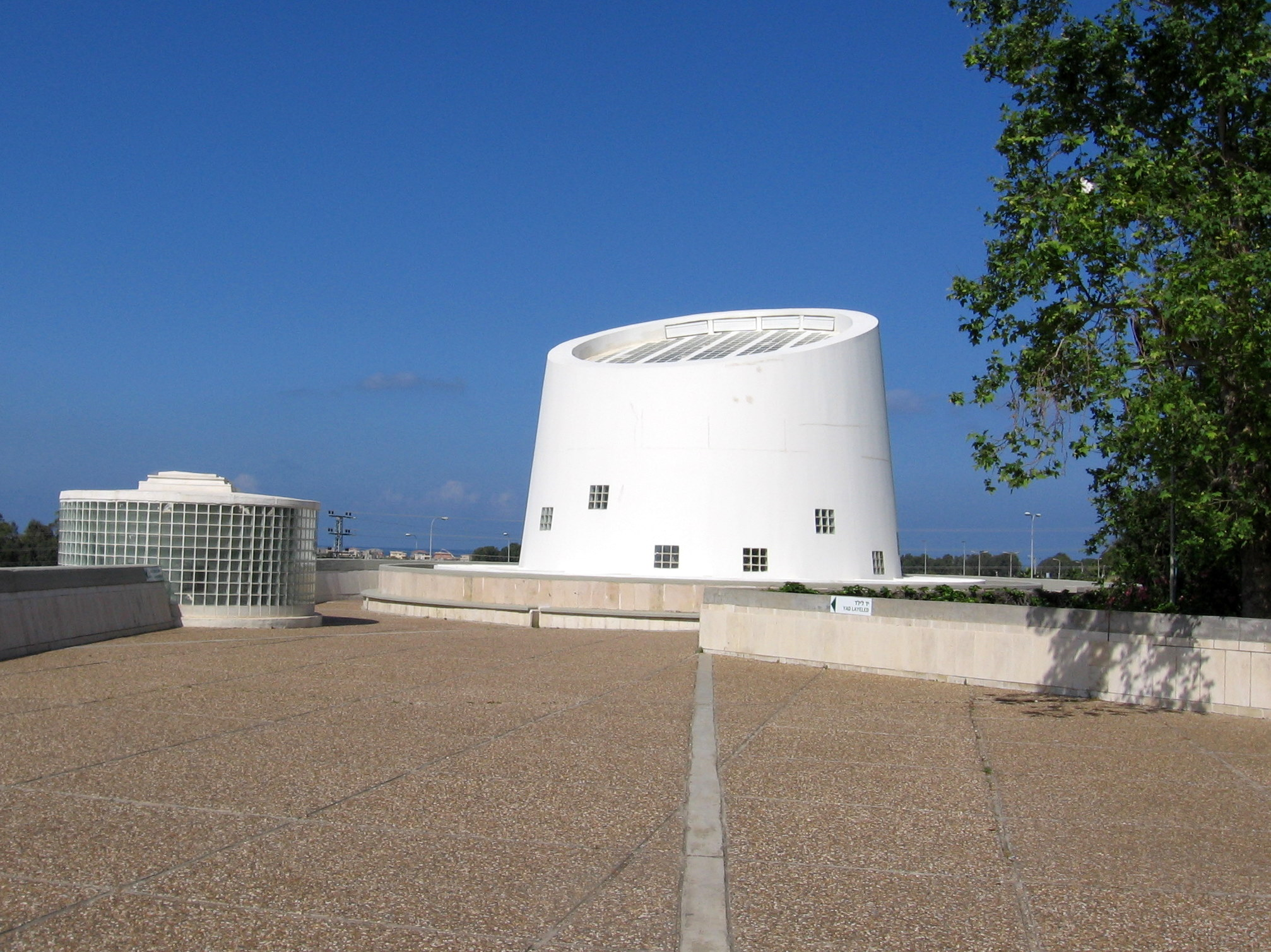
The Yad LaYeled Children's Museum

The Ghetto Fighters' House (Hebrew: בית לוחמי הגטאות, romanized: Beit Lohamei Ha-Getaot, Itzhak Katzenelson Holocaust and Jewish Resistance Heritage Museum, Documentation and Study Center) is a Holocaust museum founded in 1949 by members of Kibbutz Lohamei Hagetaot. It is located in the Western Galilee, Israel, on the Coastal Highway between Acre (Akko) and Nahariya.

== History ==
The Ghetto Fighters' House was founded in 1949. Among the founders were Holocaust survivors who fought in the ghetto undergrounds and partisan units. The museum is named for Itzhak Katzenelson, a Jewish poet who was murdered at Auschwitz.

The Ghetto Fighters' House was the world's first museum commemorating the Holocaust and Jewish heroism, with a focus on Jewish resistance in the ghettos and concentration camps. Friends of GFH associations are active in Israel, France, Austria, and the United States.

In November 2024, it was announced that the museum is in danger of closing following the Iron Swords War, the building was hit by rockets from Lebanon, and visitors are not coming.

== Departments and activities ==
- Museum exhibitions
- Guided tours (for groups in Hebrew and other languages)
- Zivia and Yitzhak "Antek" Zuckerman Study Center (facility for one-, two-, and three-day seminars)
- Yad LaYeled Children's Museum and memorial, telling the story of children during the Holocaust
- International Book-Sharing Project, using children's books about the Holocaust to foster dialogue and understanding
- Center for Humanistic Education
- Archives (documents, photographs, artifacts, art collection, recordings)
- Library and Reference Room (resources and assistance for researchers, educators and students)
- Department of Research on the Holocaust of Soviet Jewry
- Publications Department

== "Mengele's dog" ==
In 2006 a 15-page typewritten manuscript in Polish language was found in the archives titled "Pies Mengelego" ("Mengele's Dog"). It is the story of Otto, a Jewish boy of Hungarian-Polish origin from Auschwitz, whom the infamous doctor Josef Mengele forced to behave like a dog. The story superficially resembles the 1969 novel Adam Resurrected ("Adam Son of a Dog") by Yoram Kaniuk, which was made into a 2008 American-German-Israeli drama with the same title. A 2021 article in Haaretz describes attempts of a contemporary researcher to trace the fate of the "Mengele's dog" boy.

== See also ==
- Jewish resistance under Nazi rule
- Warsaw Ghetto Uprising
- Abraham Berline
