= The Gift (1994 film) =

- Genre: Short; Drama
- Written by: Samuel Fuller; Christa Lang
- Starring: Jason Adelman; Ryan Alosio; Bonnie Bedelia
- Country of origin: United States
- Original language: English

Production
- Editor: Margaret Goodspeed
- Running time: 30 min.

Original release
- Release: October 30, 1994

The Gift is a 30-minute made-for-television movie directed by Laura Dern and starring Jason Adelman, Bonnie Bedelia, Peter Horton, Diane Ladd, Isabella Rossellini and Mary Steenburgen. It is about a woman trying to cope with the prospect of breaking up with her longtime partner and moving on with her life.

== Home media ==
The film was released on DVD in Australia in "Perverse Destiny, Volume 2" with three other short films:

- Texan (1994), starring Dana Delaney, written by David Mamet
- Little Surprises (1995), directed by Jeff Goldblum
- Museum of Love (1996), starring and directed by Christian Slater
