= Berline =

Berline may refer to:

== People ==
- Abraham Berline (1893–1942), Ukrainian artist
- Byron Berline (1944–2021), American fiddle player
- Nicole Berline (born 1944), French mathematician

== Other uses ==
- Berline (airline), a former German airline (1991-1994)
- Berlin (carriage)
- Salmson SAL-2 Berline, a French biplane

== See also ==
- Berlin (disambiguation)
