= Saputo =

Saputo may refer to:

== People ==
- Gina Saputo (born 1981), American jazz singer
- Guillermo Saputo (born 1977), Argentine boxer
- Joey Saputo (born 1964), Canadian businessman, son of Lino
- Lino Saputo (born 1937), Italian-born Canadian businessman
- Sheila Saputo, character performed by American singer-songwriter and comedian Rosie Thomas (born c.1978)

== Other uses ==
- Saputo Inc., a dairy products company founded by Lino Saputo
  - Saputo Dairy UK, subsidiary of Saputo Inc.
- Saputo Stadium, soccer-specific stadium at Olympic Park in Montreal, Quebec, Canada
