= Still Blooming =

Studio album by Jeff Goldblum and the Mildred Snitzer Orchestra
- Released: April 25, 2025
- Genre: Jazz
- Length: 40:00
- Label: Decca
- Producer: Alex Frank; Scott Gilman

Jeff Goldblum and the Mildred Snitzer Orchestra chronology
I Shouldn't Be Telling You This (2019)	Still Blooming (2025)	Night Blooms (2026)

Singles from Still Blooming
- 1. "Blue Minor" Released: March 28, 2025; 2. "I Don't Know Why (I Just Do)" Released: April 25, 2025

Professional ratings
Review scores
Source	Rating
Clash	7/10

Still Blooming is the third studio album by Jeff Goldblum and the Mildred Snitzer Orchestra. It was released on April 25, 2025, via Decca Records. Produced by members Alex Frank and Scott Gilman, it features guest appearances from Ariana Grande, Cynthia Erivo, Maiya Sykes and Scarlett Johansson.

== Track listing ==
Still Blooming track listing
No.	Title	Writer(s)	Length
1.	"I Don't Know Why (I Just Do)" (featuring Ariana Grande)	Roy Turk; Fred Ahlert	3:47
2.	"The Grease Patrol"	Plas Johnson	5:54
3.	"We'll Meet Again" (featuring Cynthia Erivo)	Hughie Charles; Ross Parker	4:15
4.	"Blue Minor"	Sonny Clark	4:33
5.	"The Best Is Yet to Come" (featuring Scarlett Johansson)	Carolyn Leigh; Cy Coleman	4:33
6.	"Bye-Ya"	Thelonious Monk	4:55
7.	"Stella by Starlight" (featuring Maiya Sykes)	Victor Young; Ned Washington	4:25
8.	"Bouncing with Bud"	Earl Rudolph Powell	2:54
9.	"Ev'ry Time We Say Goodbye"	Cole Porter	4:44
Total length:			40:00

== Personnel ==
Credits adapted from Tidal.

=== Jeff Goldblum & the Mildred Snitzer Orchestra ===
- Joe Bagg – organ (all tracks), arrangement (tracks 1–6, 8, 9)
- Kenny Elliott – drums (all tracks), arrangement (4, 6, 8)
- Alex Frank – bass, conductor, music direction, production (all tracks); arrangement (1–6, 8, 9)
- Scott Gilman – tenor saxophone, production, mixing, engineering (all tracks); arrangement (4, 6, 8)
- Jeff Goldblum – piano (all tracks), arrangement (4, 6, 8)
- James King – alto saxophone (1, 3, 4, 6, 8), tenor saxophone (2), baritone saxophone (3, 4), flute (3, 5, 7, 9), arrangement (4, 6, 8)
- John Storie – guitar (all tracks), arrangement (4, 6–8)

=== Additional contributors ===
- Dave Donnelly – mastering
- Javier Cruces – engineering
- Ben Burget – engineering (5)
- John Mastro – executive production
- Leah Zeger – violin (1)
- Ariana Grande – vocals (1)
- Cynthia Erivo – vocals (3)
- Aaron Serfaty – percussion (5)
- Scarlett Johansson – vocals (5)
- Maiya Sykes – vocals (7)

== Charts ==
Chart (2025)	Peak position
French Albums (SNEP)	151
German Albums (Offizielle Top 100)	62
Scottish Albums (OCC)	9
UK Albums (OCC)	10
UK Album Downloads (OCC)	40
UK Jazz & Blues Albums (OCC)	1
US Top Album Sales (Billboard)	22
US Top Jazz Albums (Billboard)	4
US Vinyl Albums (Billboard)	13
