= I Shouldn't Be Telling You This =

Studio album by Jeff Goldblum and the Mildred Snitzer Orchestra
- Released: November 1, 2019
- Studios: Henson Recording Studios (Los Angeles, CA)
- Genre: Jazz
- Length: 41:37
- Label: Decca
- Producer: Bryan Cook

Jeff Goldblum and the Mildred Snitzer Orchestra chronology
The Capitol Studios Sessions (2018)	I Shouldn't Be Telling You This (2019)	Still Blooming (2025)

I Shouldn't Be Telling You This is the second studio album by Jeff Goldblum and the Mildred Snitzer Orchestra. It was released on November 1, 2019, via Decca Records. Recording sessions took place at Henson Recording Studios in Los Angeles. Production was handled by Bryan Cook. It features guest appearances from Anna Calvi, Fiona Apple, Gina Saputo, Gregory Porter, Inara George, Miley Cyrus and Sharon Van Etten.

== Critical reception ==
Professional ratings
Aggregate scores
Source	Rating
Metacritic	75/100
Review scores
Source	Rating
AllMusic	3.5/5 stars
The Arts Desk	4/5 stars
Consequence of Sound	B+
Gigwise	8/10 stars
The Independent	4/5 stars
Under the Radar	8/10 stars

I Shouldn't Be Telling You This was met with universal acclaim from music critics. At Metacritic, which assigns a normalized rating out of 100 to reviews from mainstream publications, the album received an average score of 75 based on five reviews.

Libby Cudmore of Consequence praised the album, stating: "The Capitol Studios Sessions could have very easily been a one-off vanity project, but with I Shouldn't Be Telling You This, Goldblum once again proves that the Mildred Snitzer Orchestra is one more way he can charm us all". Elisa Bray of The Independent found the album is "imbued with the charisma of its creator; it's a playful and inviting album whose first half zips through the mostly vocal-led numbers with ease and sprightly energy", he added: "remarkable singers give rich layers to this accomplished album". Andy Von Pip of Under the Radar wrote: "it's an album that can be enjoyed by both aficionados and inquisitive newcomers to jazz and, rather like Goldblum himself, it's as effortlessly smooth as a freshly buttered banister". AllMusic's Matt Collar concluded: "Goldblum sounds good, and his fans probably wouldn't mind hearing more of him and less of his friends".

== Track listing ==
No.	Title	Writer(s)	Length
1.	"Let's Face the Music and Dance" (featuring Sharon Van Etten)	Irving Berlin	4:07
2.	"The Sidewinder/The Beat Goes On" (featuring Inara George)	Lee Morgan; Sonny Bono	4:31
3.	"Driftin'"	Herbie Hancock	4:42
4.	"The Thrill Is Gone/Django" (featuring Miley Cyrus)	Ray Henderson; Lew Brown; John Lewis	3:55
5.	"The Kicker"	Joe Henderson	3:46
6.	"Don't Worry 'bout Me" (featuring Fiona Apple)	Rube Bloom; Ted Koehler	3:23
7.	"The Cat"	Lalo Schifrin; Rick Ward	2:51
8.	"Four on Six/Broken English" (featuring Anna Calvi)	Wes Montgomery; Marianne Faithfull; Barry Reynolds; Joe Mavety; Stephen York; Terence Stannard	4:09
9.	"If I Knew Then" (featuring Gina Saputo)	Dick Jurgens; Eddy Howard	1:44
10.	"Make Someone Happy" (featuring Gregory Porter)	Jule Styne; Betty Comden; Adolph Green	4:42
11.	"Little Man, You've Had a Busy Day"	Mabel Wayne; Al Hoffman; Maurice Sigler	3:47
Total length:			41:37

== Personnel ==
The Mildred Snitzer Orchestra

- Jeff Goldblum – piano
- John Storie – guitar, arranger
- Joe Bagg – organ, arranger
- Alex Frank – bass, arranger (tracks: 1–8, 10, 11)
- Kenny Elliott – drums
- James King – alto saxophone, baritone saxophone, tenor saxophone
- Scott Gilman – tenor saxophone

Guest musicians

- MSO Men's Chorus – backing vocals (tracks: 2, 10)
- Anna Calvi – electric guitar
- Gilbert Castellanos – trumpet
- Gina Saputo – arranger (track 9)
- Bryan Cook – producer, mixing, engineering
- Andrew Wyatt – vocal engineering (track 4)
- Dave Way – vocal engineering (track 6)
- Paul Norris – vocal engineering (track 8)
- Troy Miller – vocal engineering (track 10)
- Brian Rajaratnam – engineering assistant
- Ryan Lytle – engineering assistant
- Dale Becker – mastering
- Hector Vega – mastering assistant
- Sela Shiloni – photography
- Tim Fox – creative director
- Andrew Vottero – creative director

== Charts ==
Chart (2019)	Peak position
French Albums (SNEP)	186
Scottish Albums (Official Charts)	25
UK Albums (Official Charts)	20
UK Album Downloads (Official Charts)	17
UK Jazz & Blues Albums (Official Charts)	1
US Top Jazz Albums (Billboard)	2
