= The Capitol Studios Sessions =

2018 studio album by Jeff Goldblum & the Mildred Snitzer Orchestra

Studio album by Jeff Goldblum & the Mildred Snitzer Orchestra
- Released: November 9, 2018
- Studio: Capitol (Hollywood)
- Genre: Jazz
- Length: 57:20
- Label: Decca
- Producer: Larry Klein

Jeff Goldblum & the Mildred Snitzer Orchestra chronology
The Capitol Studios Sessions (2018)	I Shouldn't Be Telling You This (2019)

The Capitol Studios Sessions is the debut studio album by Jeff Goldblum & the Mildred Snitzer Orchestra, released by Decca Records on November 9, 2018. The jazz album was produced by Larry Klein; guest performers include Till Brönner, Imelda May, Haley Reinhart, and Sarah Silverman.

== Promotion ==
"Cantaloupe Island" and "My Baby Just Cares for Me", released in September 2018, served as promotional singles. The group and Haley Reinhart performed "My Baby Just Cares for Me" on Jimmy Kimmel Live! and "Straighten Up and Fly Right" with Imelda May on The Graham Norton Show in October 2018. Tour dates included David Lynch's Festival of Disruption in Los Angeles in October, followed by a few concerts in Europe in November 2018.

== Reception ==
Professional ratings
Aggregate scores
Source	Rating
Metacritic	66/100
Review scores
Source	Rating
The Independent	3/5 stars

The album has a score of 66 out of 100 at Metacritic, indicating generally favorable reviews. The Independent rated the album three out of five stars.

== Track listing ==
Track listing adapted from the iTunes Store

No.	Title	Writer(s)	Length
1.	"Cantaloupe Island"	Herbie Hancock	5:42
2.	"Don't Mess with Mister T" (featuring Till Brönner)	Marvin Gaye	4:34
3.	"My Baby Just Cares for Me" (featuring Haley Reinhart and Till Brönner)	Gus Kahn; Walter Donaldson	5:14
4.	"Straighten Up and Fly Right" (featuring Imelda May and Till Brönner)	Nat King Cole; Irving Mills	3:13
5.	"Jeff Introduces Sarah Silverman" (featuring Sarah Silverman)		3:01
6.	"Me and My Shadow" (featuring Sarah Silverman and Till Brönner)	Al Jolson; Billy Rose; Dave Dreyer	4:08
7.	"Nostalgia in Times Square"	Charles Mingus	4:48
8.	"It Never Entered My Mind" (featuring Till Brönner)	Richard Rodgers; Lorenz Hart	6:04
9.	"Gee Baby (Ain't I Good To You)" (featuring Haley Reinhart)	Andy Razaf; Don Redman	3:10
10.	"I Wish I Knew (How It Would Feel to Be Free)"	Billy Taylor; Richard Carroll Lamb	3:58
11.	"This Bitter Earth" (featuring Imelda May and Till Brönner)	Clyde Otis	4:18
12.	"Come On-a-My House" (featuring Imelda May and Till Brönner)	Ross Bagdasarian, Sr.; William Saroyan	3:02
13.	"Caravan" (featuring Till Brönner)	Irving Mills; Juan Tizol; Duke Ellington	5:03
14.	"Good Nights"	Giovanni Rota	1:05
Total length:			57:20

== Personnel ==
Musicians

- Jeff Goldblum – piano, spoken word (5)
- Alex Frank – bass, background vocals (4)
- Joe Bagg – Hammond organ, background vocals (4)
- John Storie – guitar, background vocals (4)
- Kenny Elliot – drums, background vocals (4)
- James King – saxophones (1, 3, 5, 7, 14), background vocals (4)
- Haley Reinhart – vocals (3, 9)
- Imelda May – vocals (4, 11, 12)
- Sarah Silverman – vocals (6), spoken word (5)
- Till Brönner – solo trumpet (2-4, 6, 8, 11-13), flugelhorn (4, 8, 11-13)

Technical and artistic personnel

- Larry Klein – producer
- Tim Palmer – mixing
- Adam Greenspan – editing
- Ivy Skoff – production coordinator
- Sandy Roberton – production coordinator
- Chandler Harrod – programming
- Ed Cherney – engineer
- Nick Rives – assistant engineer
- Bernie Grundman – mastering
- Pari Dukovic – photography
- Stuart Hardie – design
- Andrew Vottero – album creative direction, styling

== Charts ==
Chart (2018)	Peak position
Austrian Albums (Ö3 Austria)	51
Belgian Albums (Ultratop Wallonia)	167
French Albums (SNEP)	108
German Albums (Offizielle Top 100)	91
Scottish Albums (OCC)	20
Swiss Albums (Schweizer Hitparade)	86
UK Albums (OCC)	26
US Heatseekers Albums (Billboard)	4
US Jazz Albums (Billboard)	1
