= The Vulture (1981 film) =

- העיט
- Directed by: Yaky Yosha
- Written by: Yaky Yosha
- Produced by: Dorit Yosha
- Starring: Shraga Herpaz; Nitza Saul; Shimon Finkel; Hana Maron; Andy Richman; Anat Atzmon
- Music by: Yoni Rechter
- Distributed by: Yaky Yosha Ltd.
- Release date: 1981
- Running time: 92 minutes
- Country: Israel
- Language: Hebrew

The Vulture (Hebrew: העיט) is director Yaky Yosha's third feature, first screened in 1981. Its release, not long before the first war in Lebanon, dealt with the immortalization industry due to young war casualties.

The film's screenplay is based on the book The Last Jew by Yoram Kaniuk. The film was screened in Israel for about a month, but following complaints from bereaved parents, the Israeli Council for Film and Play Review decided to censor 20 seconds of it. However, the film was screened uncut at the Cannes Film Festival.

In response to the public controversy, Yoram Kaniuk stated: "The film does not judge bereaved parents, nor does it deal with them. It addresses what happens to a young person after a war".

== Plot ==
Boaz, a young officer, returns home from the Yom Kippur War (1973). He left for the war with two friends and returned with one dead and one badly injured. Down and out and lonely, Boaz aimlessly wanders the streets of Tel-Aviv. To comfort himself, Boaz goes to console his dead friend's parents, only to find himself sucked into a most complex relationship with the bereaved parents. First out of courtesy, then out of cynicism, Boaz gives them all they are missing: a poem their son allegedly wrote, false tales of heroism and some occasional snapshots. Out of thin air Boaz erects a false monument of a dead hero out of a fairly mediocre child, who did not get to leave much behind him.

Before long, Boaz is running a full scale industry, “manufacturing” for each bereaved family. A soldier and a poet. Boaz simultaneously becomes romantically involved with both his dead friend's girlfriend and the coordinator in the army's memorial department. Soon after war breaks out and Boaz is called again for duty. Now an older and more experienced officer, Boaz makes sure every single soldier in his company carries in his pocket a personal poem, just in case.

The Vulture represented Israel at the Cannes Festival 1981.
