= Jeff Goldblum =

American actor and musician (born 1952)

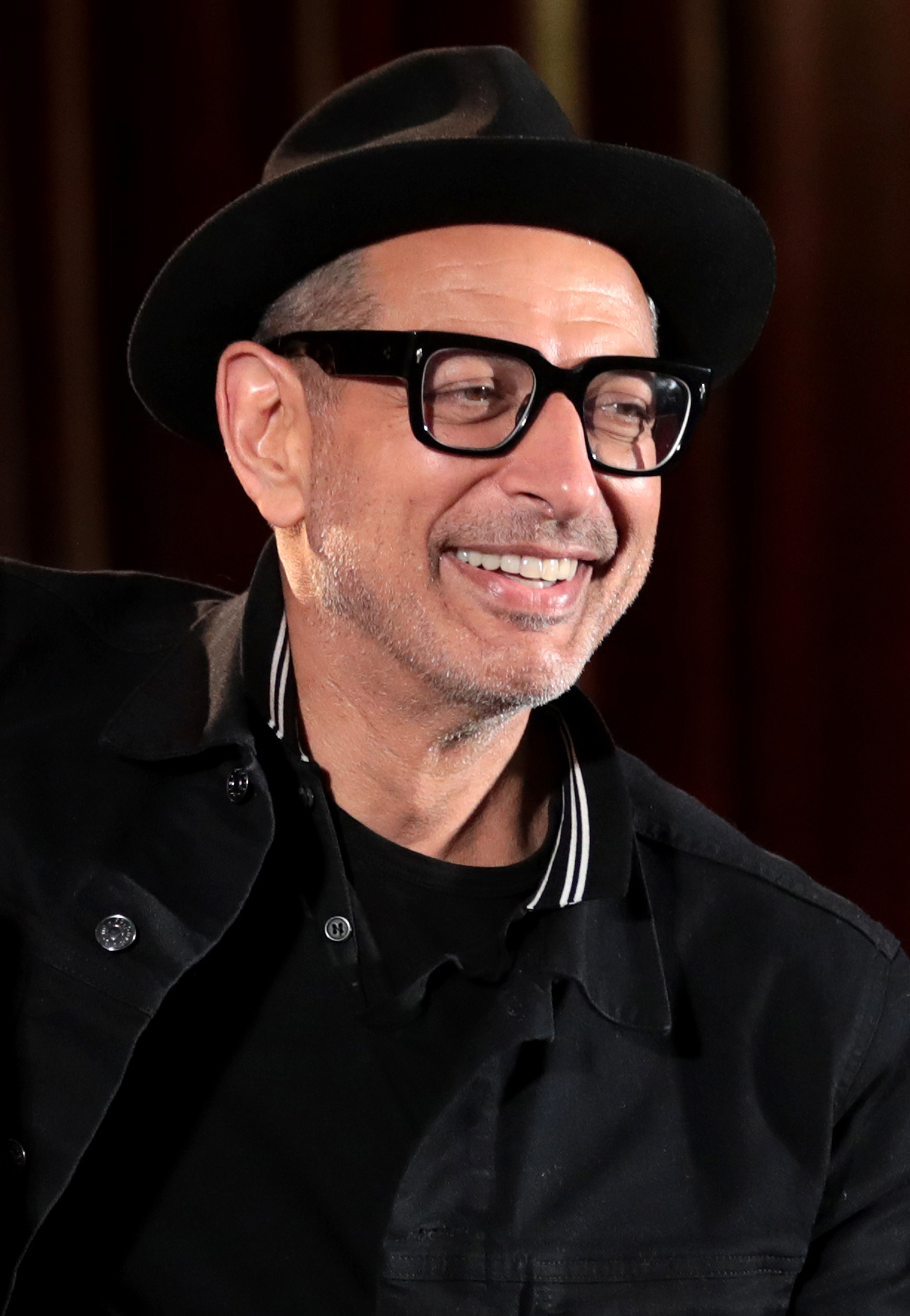
- Goldblum in 2019
- Born: Jeffrey Lynn Goldblum; October 22, 1952 (age 74); West Homestead, Pennsylvania, US
- Occupations: Actor; musician
- Years active: 1974–present
- Spouses: Patricia Gaul (m. 1980; div. 1985); Geena Davis (m. 1987; div. 1991); Emilie Livingston (m. 2014)
- Children: 2
- Relatives: Deborah Geffner (first cousin)
- Musical career
- Genre: Jazz
- Instruments: Vocals; piano
- Years active: 2001; 2018–present
- Label: Decca
- Member of: Jeff Goldblum & the Mildred Snitzer Orchestra

Jeffrey Lynn Goldblum (/ˈɡoʊldbluːm/ GOHLD-bloom; born October 22, 1952) is an American actor and musician. He has starred in some of the highest-grossing films of all time, such as Jurassic Park (1993) and Independence Day (1996), as well as their sequels.

Goldblum made his acting film debut in Death Wish (1974) with early small roles in California Split (1974), Nashville (1975), and Annie Hall (1977). He gained wider attention for his roles in Invasion of the Body Snatchers (1978), The Big Chill (1983), and The Fly (1986). Since then, he has been best-known for his roles in several blockbuster franchises, such as Ian Malcolm in the Jurassic Park franchise, David Levinson in the Independence Day films, Grandmaster in the Marvel Cinematic Universe (MCU) films such as Thor: Ragnarok (2017) and more recently, as the Wizard of Oz in Wicked (2024) and Wicked: For Good (2025).

A frequent collaborator of director Wes Anderson, Goldblum has starred in his films The Life Aquatic with Steve Zissou (2004), The Grand Budapest Hotel (2014), Isle of Dogs (2018), and Asteroid City (2023). He is also known for independent films like Deep Cover (1991), Igby Goes Down (2002), and Adam Resurrected (2008). He has been nominated for an Academy Award for Best Live Action Short Film for Little Surprises (1996).

He has also appeared in several TV series, including Will & Grace, for which he received a Primetime Emmy Award for Outstanding Guest Actor in a Comedy Series nomination, as well as appeared in Friends, Portlandia, and Inside Amy Schumer. He hosted his own series, The World According to Jeff Goldblum (2019–2022). His jazz band released their first album, The Capitol Studios Sessions, in 2018.

== Early life and education ==
Jeffrey Lynn Goldblum was born on October 22, 1952 to Jewish parents in West Homestead, Pennsylvania, located just outside of Pittsburgh. His mother, Shirley Jane Goldblum (née Temeles; October 30, 1926 – January 9, 2012), was a radio broadcaster who later ran a kitchen equipment and appliances sales firm; his father, Harold Leonard Goldblum (April 25, 1920 – February 23, 1983), was a physician and major in the U.S. Army during World War II. His family was from the Russian and Austro-Hungarian empires, with roots in Starobin (now Belarus) and Zolochiv (now Ukraine). He has a sister, Pamela. His brother, Rick, whom Goldblum has described as a "kind of hero of mine", died in 1971 at age 23 while travelling in Morocco, having contracted dysentery which led to kidney failure. Goldblum, an accomplished jazz pianist, credits his interest in jazz music to Rick's influence while they were growing up. He has stated that his brother's early death made him "more focused" and gave him a determination to "save myself and survive". His other brother, Lee, was secretly gay, and struggled with health issues before his death in 2000.

During his childhood, his parents were interested in show business. His father nearly studied acting before deciding to pursue medical studies, going on to become chief of medicine at a Pittsburgh hospital. Goldblum moved to New York City at 17 to become an actor. He worked on the stage and studied acting at the Neighborhood Playhouse under the guidance of acting coach Sanford Meisner. He made his Broadway debut in the Tony Award-winning musical Two Gentlemen of Verona.

== Career ==
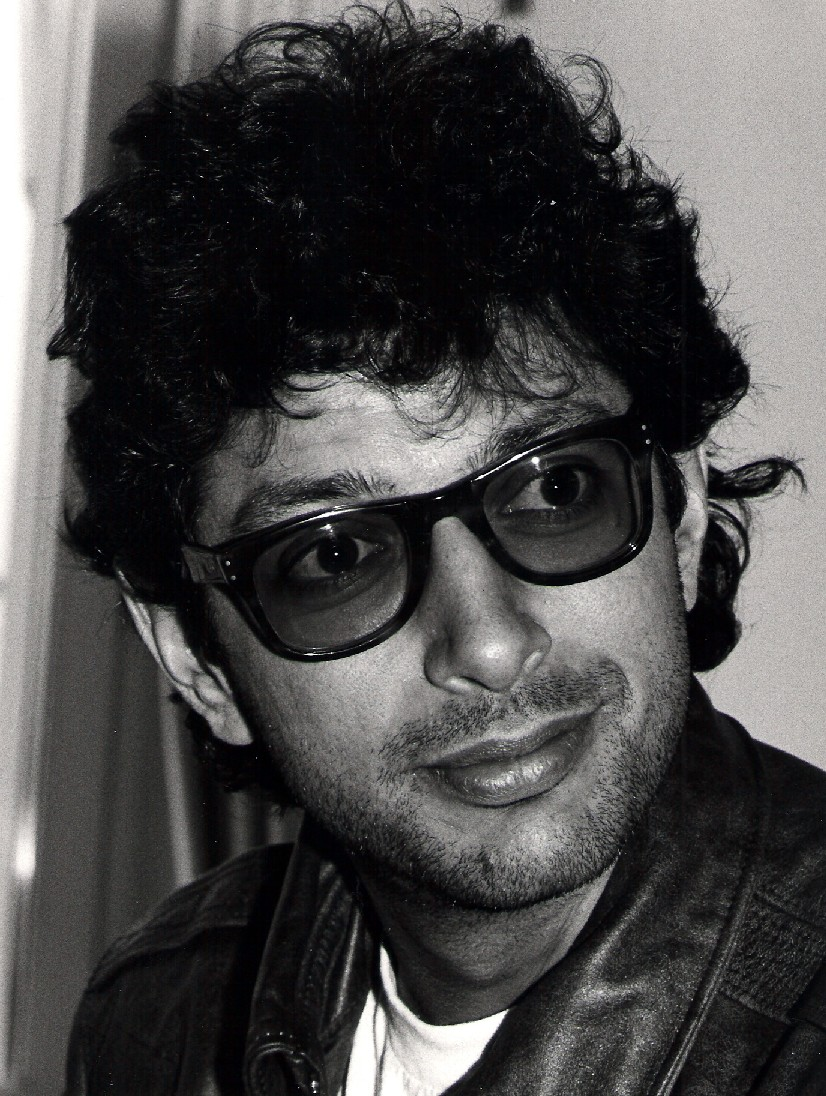
Goldblum in 1985

Goldblum made his film debut as a home-invading thug in the 1974 Charles Bronson film Death Wish. He briefly appeared as a protester in the TV movie Columbo: A Case of Immunity (1975). He had a brief part as a party guest in Annie Hall (1977); Goldblum is seen speaking into a telephone at a Hollywood party, "This is Mr. Davis. I forgot my mantra."

Goldblum starred as comedian Ernie Kovacs in the 1984 TV movie Ernie Kovacs: Between the Laughter. The movie dealt with the real-life kidnapping of Kovacs' two daughters by his former first wife. Actress Edie Adams, Kovacs' second wife and his widow, made a cameo appearance in the well-received movie.

Goldblum has had leading roles in films such as The Fly (1986), Deep Cover (1992), Jurassic Park (1993), Earth Girls Are Easy (1989), The Tall Guy (1989), Vibes (1988), Into the Night (1985) and The Lost World: Jurassic Park (1997).

Goldblum's supporting roles include Invasion of the Body Snatchers (1978), The Big Chill (1983), The Adventures of Buckaroo Banzai Across the Eighth Dimension (1984), Independence Day (1996), and Igby Goes Down (2002), as well as the Wes Anderson films The Life Aquatic with Steve Zissou (2004), The Grand Budapest Hotel (2014), and Asteroid City (2023).

For several years in the 1990s, Goldblum was the voice for most U.S. Apple commercials, including advertisements for the iMac and iBook. He also voices some U.S. Toyota commercials as well as Procter & Gamble's facial cream line. He has appeared on Irish TV in a commercial for the National Lottery filmed in 2003.

Goldblum taught acting at Playhouse West in North Hollywood with Robert Carnegie. It was with several actors from this acting company that he improvised and directed the live action short film Little Surprises, which was nominated for an Academy Award in 1996.

Goldblum played the role of Adam in Adam Resurrected, a film adaptation of the Yoram Kaniuk novel with the same name about a former Jewish German entertainer who becomes the ringleader to a group of Holocaust survivors in an asylum after World War II.

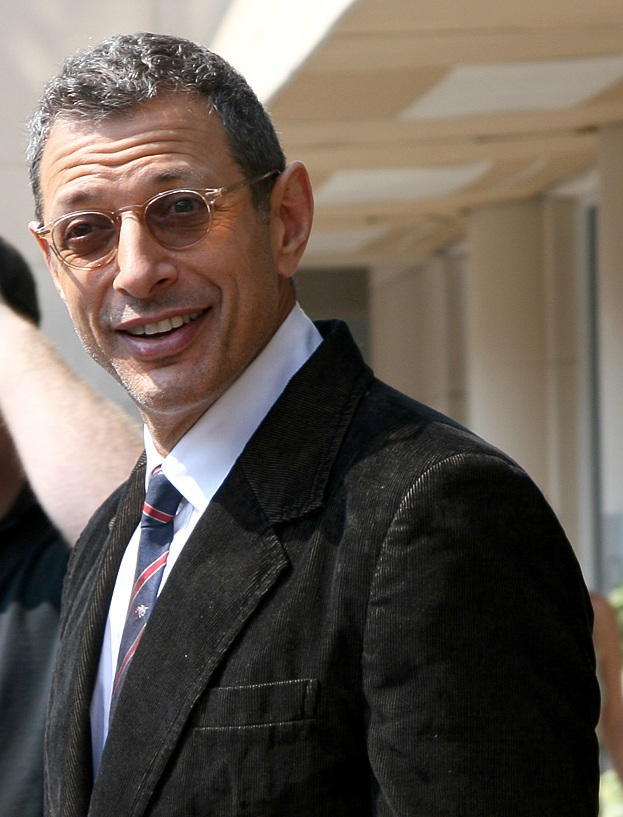
Goldblum at the 2007 Toronto International Film Festival

He made a guest appearance on Sesame Street in 1990 as Bob's long-lost brother Minneapolis (parody of Indiana Jones), in a sketch where Big Bird's friend Mr. Snuffleupagus had "the golden cabbage of Snuffertiti" hidden in his cave. He has appeared on Tom Goes to the Mayor, The Colbert Report, Tim and Eric Awesome Show Great Job! and Portlandia.

In September 2006, it was announced that Goldblum was one of the founding members of a new theater company in New York called The Fire Dept.

Goldblum replaced Chris Noth as a senior detective on Law & Order: Criminal Intent. In the series, Goldblum plays Detective Zack Nichols. In August 2010, media outlets reported that Goldblum had decided not to return to Criminal Intent due to persistent concerns about the program's future.

In 2014, Goldblum's jazz band, the Mildred Snitzer Orchestra, performed weekly at the Carlyle Hotel. Also in 2014, he appeared in an episode of Last Week Tonight parodying his role in Law & Order. In 2016, he reprised his role of David Levinson in Independence Day: Resurgence, the sequel to Roland Emmerich's 1996 alien invasion/disaster film Independence Day.

In November 2015, he joined the ensemble cast of Shane Carruth's stalled film The Modern Ocean. Goldblum played The Grandmaster in the Marvel superhero film Thor: Ragnarok (2017). He reprised his role as Dr. Ian Malcolm in Jurassic World: Fallen Kingdom (2018) and Jurassic World Dominion (2022); with these films, Goldblum tied with BD Wong for the most appearances out of all the cast members in the franchise.

On May 29, 2018, Billboard reported that he had been signed by Decca Records to record a studio album for release later in the year. The Capitol Studios Sessions, the debut with the Mildred Snitzer Orchestra, duly appeared on November 9, 2018. This was followed a year later by I Shouldn't Be Telling You This, with the band having played Glastonbury that summer. The band's third release, Plays Well with Others, was released on March 24, 2023.

In July 2018, a 25 ft (7.6m) statue of Goldblum was erected next to London's Tower Bridge as a temporary installation in order to mark 25 years since the release of Jurassic Park. At Disney's D23 Expo in 2019, Disney announced the show The World According to Jeff Goldblum would feature Goldblum and be available at the launch of the Disney+ streaming service on November 12, 2019.

Goldblum was the subject of the 2021 biography Because He's Jeff Goldblum (Penguin Random House), written by Washington Post features writer Travis M. Andrews. In October 2022, it was reported that Goldblum was in final talks to play the Wizard in the two-part film adaptation of the musical Wicked. His role in the film was confirmed on December 8, 2022.

He released Night Blooms, a collaborative jazz album with The Mildred Snitzer Orchestra, in June 2026.

== Personal life ==
From 1980 to 1985, Goldblum was married to Patricia Gaul, with whom he appeared in Silverado (1985). From 1987 to 1991, he was married to Geena Davis, his co-star in Transylvania 6-5000 (1985), The Fly (1986), and Earth Girls Are Easy (1988).

Since 2014, Goldblum has been married to Canadian Olympic rhythmic gymnast Emilie Livingston. They have two sons, born in 2015 and 2017. They reside in the Hollywood Hills.

Goldblum is a pescatarian, stating in 2025 that he had been influenced by the themes of animal cruelty in Wicked.

== Acting credits ==
=== Film ===
Year	Title	Role	Notes	Ref.
1974	Death Wish	Freak #1		
1974	California Split	Lloyd Harris		
1975	Nashville	Tricycle Man		
1976	Next Stop, Greenwich Village	Clyde Baxter		
1976	St. Ives	Hood #3		
1976	Special Delivery	Snake		
1977	The Sentinel	Jack		
1977	Annie Hall	Lacey Party Guest		
1977	Between the Lines	Max Arloft		
1978	Remember My Name	Mr. Nudd		
1978	Thank God It's Friday	Tony Di Marco		
1978	Invasion of the Body Snatchers	Jack Bellicec		
1981	Threshold	Aldo Gehring		
1983	The Big Chill	Michael Gold		
1983	The Right Stuff	Recruiter		
1984	The Adventures of Buckaroo Banzai Across the 8th Dimension	New Jersey		
1984	Terror in the Aisles	Jack Bellicec		
1985	Into the Night	Ed Okin		
1985	Silverado	"Slick" Calvin Stanhope		
1985	Transylvania 6-5000	Jack Harrison		
1986	The Fly	Seth Brundle		
1987	Beyond Therapy	Bruce		
1988	Vibes	Nick Deezy		
1988	Earth Girls Are Easy	Mac		
1989	The Tall Guy	Dexter King		
1989	El Sueño del Mono Loco	Dan Gillis		
1990	Mister Frost	Mr. Frost		
1991	The Favour, the Watch and the Very Big Fish	Pianist		
1992	Fathers & Sons	Max		
1992	The Player	Himself	Cameo	
1992	Deep Cover	David Jason		
1992	Shooting Elizabeth	Howard Pigeon		
1993	Jurassic Park	Dr. Ian Malcolm		
1995	Hideaway	Hatch Harrison		
1995	Nine Months	Sean Fletcher		
1995	Powder	Donald Ripley		
1996	The Great White Hype	Mitchell Kane		
1996	Independence Day	David Levinson		
1996	Little Surprises	—N/a	Director; Short	
1996	Mad Dog Time	Mickey Holliday		
1997	The Lost World: Jurassic Park	Dr. Ian Malcolm		
1998	Holy Man	Ricky Hayman		
1998	The Prince of Egypt	Aaron	Voice	
1998	Welcome to Hollywood	Himself	Cameo	
2000	Beyond Suspicion	John Nolan		
2000	Chain of Fools	Avnet		
2000	One of the Hollywood Ten	Herbert Biberman		
2001	Perfume	Jamie	Also executive producer	
2001	Cats & Dogs	Professor Brody		
2002	Run Ronnie Run!	Himself	Uncredited cameo	
2002	Igby Goes Down	D.H. Banes		
2003	Dallas 362	Bob		
2003	Spinning Boris	George Gorton		
2004	Incident at Loch Ness	Party Guest	Cameo	
2004	The Life Aquatic with Steve Zissou	Allistair Hennessey		
2006	Mini's First Time	Mike Rudell		
2006	Fay Grim	Agent Fulbright		
2006	Pittsburgh	Himself	Also producer	
2006	Man of the Year	Stewart		
2008	Adam Resurrected	Adam Stein		
2010	The Switch	Leonard		
2010	Morning Glory	Jerry Barnes		
2012	Tim and Eric's Billion Dollar Movie	Chef Goldblum		
2012	Zambezia	Ajax	Voice	
2013	Le Week-End	Morgan		
2014	The Grand Budapest Hotel	Deputy Kovacs		
2015	Mortdecai	Milton Krampf		
2015	Unity	Narrator	Voice; Documentary	
2016	Independence Day: Resurgence	David Levinson		
2017	Miyubi	The Creator	Short	
2017	Guardians of the Galaxy Vol. 2	The Grandmaster	Cameo; Post-credits scene	
2017	Thor: Ragnarok	The Grandmaster		
2018	Team Darryl	The Grandmaster	Short film	
2018	Isle of Dogs	Duke	Voice	
2018	Jurassic World: Fallen Kingdom	Dr. Ian Malcolm		
2018	Hotel Artemis	Niagara (The Wolf King)		
2018	The Mountain	Dr. Wallace Fiennes		
2021	The Boss Baby: Family Business	Dr. Erwin Armstrong	Voice	
2022	Jurassic World Dominion	Dr. Ian Malcolm		
2023	Asteroid City	The Alien		
2023	They Shot the Piano Player (Dispararon al pianista)	Narrator	Voice	
2024	Wicked	The Wonderful Wizard of Oz		
2025	Wicked: For Good	The Wonderful Wizard of Oz		
TBA	Lizard Music †		Voice, filming	

=== Television ===
Year	Title	Role	Notes	Ref.
1975	Columbo	Protester	Episode: "A Case of Immunity"	
1976	The Blue Knight	Daggett	Episode: "Upward Mobility"	
1977	Starsky & Hutch	Harry Markham	Episode: "Murder on Stage 17"	
1980	The Legend of Sleepy Hollow	Ichabod Crane	Television film	
1980	Tenspeed and Brown Shoe	Lionel Whitney	14 episodes	
1982	Rehearsal for Murder	Leo Gibbs	Television film	
1982	Laverne & Shirley	Jeffrey	Episode: "Watch the Fur Fly"	
1982	The Devlin Connection	Alexis Papageorgio	Episode: "The Absolute Monarch of Ward C"	
1984	Ernie Kovacs: Between the Laughter	Ernie Kovacs	Television film	
1984	American Playhouse	Sophisticated urbanite	Episode: "Popular Neurotics"	
1985	Faerie Tale Theatre	Buck Wolf	Episode: "The Three Little Pigs"	
1986	The Ray Bradbury Theater	Cogswell	Episode: "The Town Where No One Got Off"	
1987	Life Story	James Watson	Television film	
1990	Sesame Street	Minneapolis	Episode 21.72	
1990	Framed	Wiley	Television film	
1990–1991	Captain Planet and the Planeteers	Verminous Skumm	Voice; 5 episodes	
1993	Lush Life	Al Gorky	Television film	
1993, 1997	Saturday Night Live	Himself (host)	2 episodes	
1994	Future Quest	Himself (host)	22 episodes	
1995, 1998	The Larry Sanders Show	Jeff Goldblum	2 episodes	
1996	The Simpsons	MacArthur Parker	Voice; episode: "A Fish Called Selma"	
1998	Mr. Show with Bob and David	Civil War Narrator	Voice; episode: "Like Chickens... Delicious Chickens"	
2002	King of the Hill	Dr. Vayzosa	Voice; episode: "The Substitute Spanish Prisoner"	
2002	Robbie the Reindeer in Legend of the Lost Tribe	White Rabbit	Voice; Television special	
2003	Friends	Leonard Hayes	Episode: "The One with the Mugging"	
2003	War Stories	Ben Dansmore	Television film	
2003–2005	Crank Yankers	Prof. Fermstein	Voice; 2 episodes	
2004	Tom Goes to the Mayor	Bill Joel	Voice; Episode: "Toodle Day"	
2005	Will & Grace	Scott Wooley	3 episodes	
2007	Raines	Michael Raines	7 episodes	
2007	Tim and Eric Awesome Show, Great Job!	Himself	2 episodes	
2009–2010	Law & Order: Criminal Intent	Detective Zack Nichols	24 episodes	
2011	NTSF:SD:SUV::	Gunnar Geirhart	Episode: "Full Hauser"	
2011	Allen Gregory	Perry Van Moon	Voice; episode: "Van Moon Rising"	
2011–2012	The League	Rupert Ruxin	2 episodes	
2012	Susan 313	Benny Burnet	Pilot	
2012	Glee	Hiram Berry	2 episodes	
2012–2015	Portlandia	Various roles	5 episodes	
2014	Monkey Love	Roger	Voice; Episode: "It's a Jungle Out There"	
2014	Last Week Tonight with John Oliver	Civil Forfeiture Cop	Episode: "Civil Forfeiture"	
2015	Inside Amy Schumer	Jury Foreman	Episode: "12 Angry Men Inside Amy Schumer"	
2016	Unbreakable Kimmy Schmidt	Dr. Dave	Episode: "Kimmy Meets a Celebrity!"	
2017	Tour de Pharmacy	Marty Hass	Television film	
2019	Peanuts in Space: Secrets of Apollo 10	Himself	Short	
2019	Happy!	God	Voice; Episode: "Resurrection"	
2019–2022	The World According to Jeff Goldblum	Himself (host)	22 episodes	
2020	RuPaul's Drag Race	Himself (guest judge)	Episode: "Choices 2020"	
2021; 2023	What If...?	The Grandmaster	Voice; 2 episodes: "What If... Thor Were an Only Child?", "What If... Iron Man Crashed Into the Grandmaster?"	
2022	Search Party	Tunnel Quinn	6 episodes	
2022	Big Mouth	Apple Brooch	Voice; Episode: "The Apple Brooch"	
2024	Kaos	Zeus	Main role	
2024	Jimmy Kimmel Live!	Himself (guest host)	15 episodes	
2026	Henry David Thoreau	Henry David Thoreau	Voice; 3 episodes	
2026	Saturday Night Live UK	Himself (host)	Episode: "Jeff Goldblum / CMAT"	

=== Theater ===
Year	Title	Role	Venue	Ref.
1971	Two Gentlemen of Verona	Citizen / Eglamour	St. James Theatre, Broadway	
1981	The Moony Shapiro Songbook	Various roles	Morosco Theatre, Broadway	
1989	Twelfth Night	Malvolio	The Public Theater, Off Broadway	
2002	The Exonerated	Gary Gauger	Culture Project, Off Broadway	
2003	The Play What I Wrote	Mystery Guest	Lyceum Theatre, Broadway	
2004	The Music Man	Professor Harold Hill	Pittsburgh Civic Light Opera	
2005	The Pillowman	Tupolski	Booth Theatre, Broadway	
2008	Speed-the-Plow	Gould	The Old Vic, London	
2010	The Prisoner of Second Avenue	Mel Edison	Vaudeville Theatre, West End	
2012	Seminar	Leonard	John Golden Theatre, Broadway	
2014	Domesticated	Bill	Lincoln Center Theatre, Off Broadway	

=== Audio fiction ===
Year	Title	Role	Notes	Ref.
2021–present	Dark Dice	Balmur / The Silent One	Actual play podcast; featured as player in season 2; as voice actor in season 3	

=== Video games ===
Year	Title	Role	Notes	Ref.
1996	Goosebumps: Escape from Horrorland	Count Dracula	Video	
1997	Independence Day	David Levinson	Voice	
1997	The Lost World: Jurassic Park	Dr. Ian Malcolm	Video	
1997	Chaos Island: The Lost World	Dr. Ian Malcolm	Voice	
2002	Quest for the Code	Alex Dander	Voice	
2015	Call of Duty: Black Ops III	Nero Blackstone	Voice	
2015	Lego Jurassic World	Dr. Ian Malcolm	Voice	via archival audio
2018	Jurassic World Evolution	Dr. Ian Malcolm	Voice	
2020	Jurassic World Aftermath	Dr. Ian Malcolm	Voice	
2021	Jurassic World Evolution 2	Dr. Ian Malcolm	Voice	
2025	Jurassic World Evolution 3	Dr. Ian Malcolm	Voice	

== Discography ==
Jeff Goldblum & the Mildred Snitzer Orchestra
Studio albums

Title	Details	Peak chart positions	
Title	Details	AUS	UK
The Capitol Studios Sessions	Release date: November 9, 2018; Label: Decca; Formats: CD, vinyl, digital download	—	26
I Shouldn't Be Telling You This	Release date: November 1, 2019; Label: Decca; Formats: CD, vinyl, digital download	—	20
Still Blooming	Release date: April 25, 2025; Label: Decca; Formats: CD, vinyl, digital download	—	10
Night Blooms	Release date: June 5, 2026; Label: Decca; Formats: CD, vinyl, digital download	45	9

Extended plays

Title	Details
Plays Well with Others	Release date: March 24, 2023; Label: Decca; Formats: EP, vinyl, digital download

Compilation appearances

Title	Details
Hollywood Goes Wild!	Song: "Born Free'ky"; Release date: March 27, 2001; Label: Navarre Corporation; Formats: CD, vinyl

== Awards and nominations ==
Year	Award	Category	Project	Result	Ref.
1981	Genie Award	Best Performance by a Foreign Actor	Threshold	Nominated	
1986	National Society of Film Critics	Best Actor	The Fly	2nd Place	
1986	New York Film Critics Circle	Best Actor	The Fly	3rd place	
1986	Saturn Award	Best Actor	The Fly	Won	
1992	Chicago Film Critics Association	Best Supporting Actor	Deep Cover	Nominated	
1992	Independent Spirit Award	Best Supporting Male	Deep Cover	Nominated	
1993	Saturn Award	Best Supporting Actor	Jurassic Park	Nominated	
1996	Saturn Award	Best Actor	Independence Day	Nominated	
1996	Academy Award	Best Live Action Short Film	Little Surprises	Nominated	
2004	Boston Society of Film Critics Award	Best Ensemble	The Life Aquatic with Steve Zissou	Won	
2004	Broadcast Film Critics Association	Best Cast	The Life Aquatic with Steve Zissou	Nominated	
2005	Primetime Emmy Award	Outstanding Guest Actor in a Comedy Series	Will & Grace	Nominated	
2013	British Independent Film Award	Best Supporting Actor	Le Week-End	Nominated	
2014	Screen Actors Guild Award	Outstanding Cast in a Motion Picture	The Grand Budapest Hotel	Nominated	
2014	Broadcast Film Critics Association	Best Acting Ensemble	The Grand Budapest Hotel	Nominated	
2014	Detroit Film Critics Society	Best Ensemble	The Grand Budapest Hotel	Won	
2014	Florida Film Critics Circle	Best Ensemble	The Grand Budapest Hotel	Won	
2014	Georgia Film Critics Circle	Best Ensemble	The Grand Budapest Hotel	Won	
2014	Phoenix Film Critics Society	Best Ensemble Acting	The Grand Budapest Hotel	Nominated	
2014	San Diego Film Critics Society	Best Ensemble	The Grand Budapest Hotel	Nominated	
2020	Primetime Emmy Award	Outstanding Hosted Nonfiction Series or Special	The World According to Jeff Goldblum	Nominated	
2022	Primetime Emmy Award	Outstanding Hosted Nonfiction Series or Special	The World According to Jeff Goldblum	Nominated	
2022	Miami Web Fest	Best Actor /Performer in a Podcast	Dark Dice	Won	
2022	Signal Awards	Most Innovative Audio Experience	Dark Dice	Won	
2022	Signal Awards	Most Innovative Audio Experience (Listener's Choice)	Dark Dice	Won	
2022	Audio Verse Awards	Best Actor in an Improvised Production	Dark Dice	Won	
2022	Indie Series Awards	Best Actor - Audio Fiction	Dark Dice	Won	
2024	Screen Actors Guild Award	Outstanding Cast in a Motion Picture	Wicked	Nominated	
2024	Broadcast Film Critics Association	Best Acting Ensemble	Wicked	Nominated	
2025	Nickelodeon Kids' Choice Awards	Favorite Villain	Wicked	Nominated	
2026	Saturn Award	Best Supporting Actor	Wicked: For Good	Nominated	
