= Lazarre Seymour Simckes =

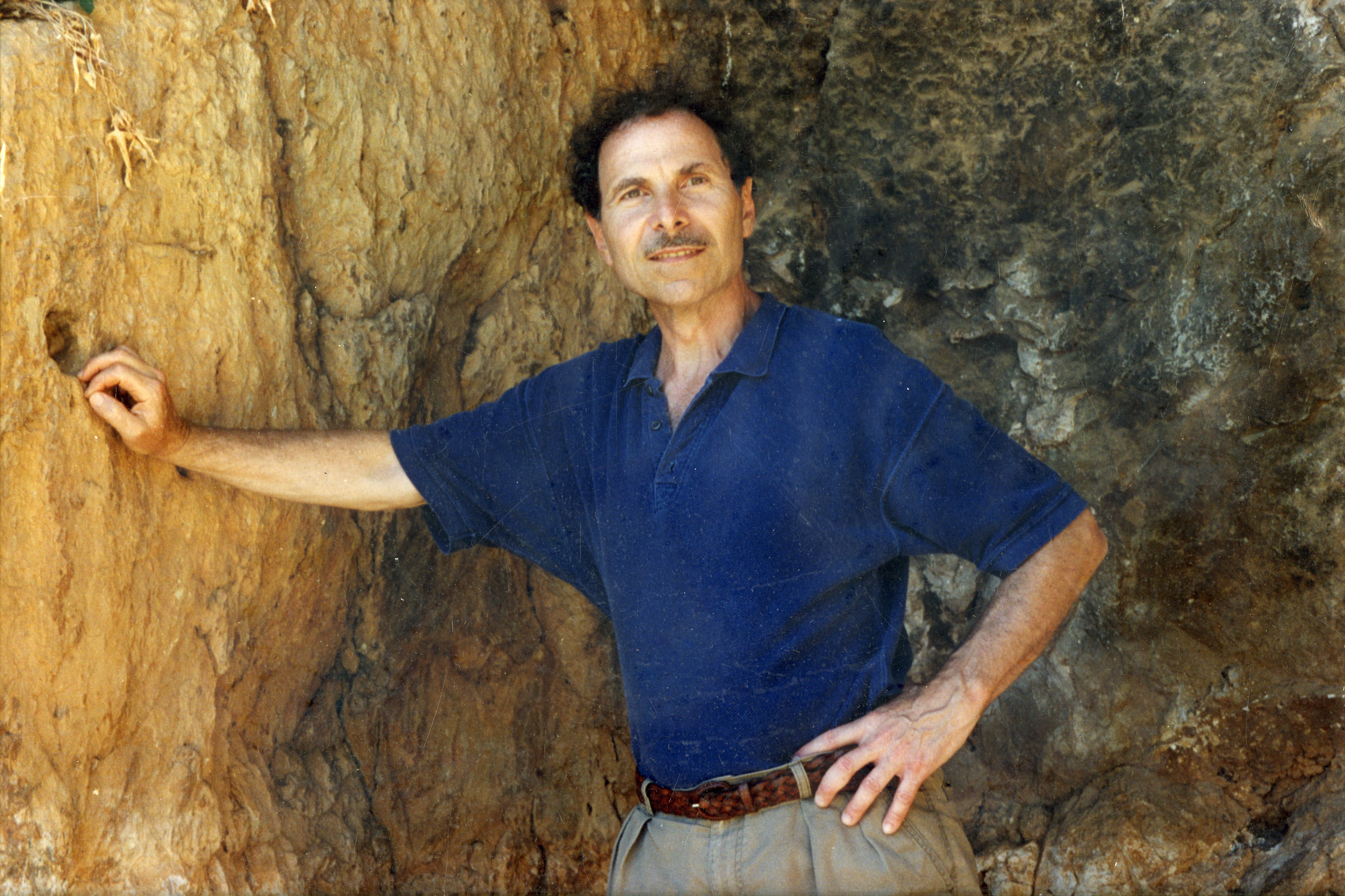
Simckes, while on a Fulbright to Israel, 1996

Lazarre Seymour Simckes is a playwright, novelist, educator, Hebrew-English translator, and psychotherapist. He has developed approaches to the use of creative writing in areas including prison therapy and cross-cultural communication between students in the Middle East.

== Life and works ==
Simckes, descended from a long line of rabbis (including his father Herbert Isaac Simckes, grandfather Mnachem Risikoff and great-grandfather Zvi Yosef Resnick).

He was born in Saratoga Springs, New York, and raised in Boston.

He is a graduate of Harvard College (Magna Cum Laude, Phi Beta Kappa), Stanford University (Wallace Stegner Writing Fellow, M.A.), and Harvard University (Ph.D.). He has taught at colleges and universities throughout the United States including Harvard, Yale, Williams, Vassar, Brandeis and Tufts, and in Israel at Bar-Ilan and at the University of Haifa.

He has conducted live, interactive writing workshops via satellite linking middle school and high school students across the United States, including the Virgin Islands. During his Fulbright year at the University of Haifa, he conducted a similar workshop linking Israeli Arab and Jewish high school students with their counterparts in America ("Celebrating Differences").

=== Playwright ===
His first play, Seven Days of Mourning (adapted from his novel published by Random House), was staged on Broadway at Circle in the Square. Clive Barnes called it "spiky, yet intensely moving. A Fiddler on the Roof without music, but with blood. Unique, wild, funny. It still haunts me."

Simckes wrote the off-off-Broadway play Ten Best Martyrs of the Year, a Theater for the New City (TNC) production directed by Crystal Field, about the ten rabbis who were tortured to death in Rome for supporting the revolt led by Bar Kokhbah in 2nd century Israel. Simckes said of that play, "I tend to make tragic comment in a mixture of styles. So what did I do? I wrote a play as if through the eyes of Hadrian, the Roman emperor, watching the genocide of the Jews from his balcony." The play was reviewed by Michael Smith in The Village Voice as "timeless, mythic, enlivened by all kinds of stylistic intrusions and an almost hysterical inventiveness."

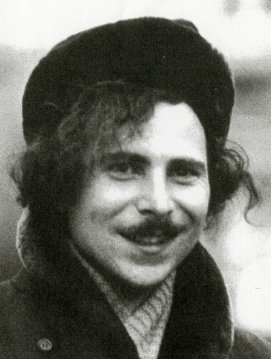
Cambridge, Massachusetts, 1969

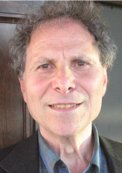
New Haven, Connecticut, 2009

Another of Smickes' off-off-Broadway productions, Nossig's Antics, also a TNC production directed by Crystal Field, focuses on the character of Alfred Nossig, who was accused of collaborating with Nazis in the Warsaw Ghetto, and executed in 1943, just before his 80th birthday, by a Jewish fighters organization. The critic Richard McBee called it "a riveting puzzle," and it has also been described as a "dark farce" and an "absurd exploration of history and the horrific times we live in."

His other plays include Minutes, a fictional encounter between Sigmund Freud and Gustav Mahler; "Soldier Boys" about Czar Nicholas's 1827 edict to recruit Jews into the Russian army for the first time, including children as Cadets, which had a reading at Theater for the New City with Judd Hirsch as the Czar; and "Open Rehearsal," chosen by Edward Albee as first runner-up in the inaugural 2006-2007 Yale Drama Series Competition, He also wrote the screenplay for Sidney Lumet's movie version of The Last Temptation of Christ, which has not yet been produced.

=== Novelist and translator ===
Simckes's first published work was a translation of two stories by the Israeli author, S. Y. Agnon, followed by the short story, "Behold My Servant!", published in Stanford Short Stories 1962. His novels include Seven Days in Mourning and The Comatose Kids. He has translated a number of works from Hebrew to English, including Adam Resurrected, The Chocolate Deal, and Commander of the Exodus. He also translated Nava Semel's children's book, Becoming Gershona, about a twelve-year-old girl in 1958 Tel Aviv, which won the National Jewish Book Award for Children's Literature.

In addition to Hebrew, Simckes is fluent in Yiddish, and according to the director of the film Kvetch, Austin Kase, Simckes was one of the inspirations for the movie, and also appeared in it.

=== Psychotherapist ===
As a practicing psychotherapist, Simckes has worked with multi-problem families and imprisoned sex offenders.

An article in The Israeli Fulbrighter notes that Simckes found a "dual vocation as a writer and healer." After studying at the Kantor Family Institute in Cambridge, Massachusetts, he began using brief writing assignments with patients in Massachusetts and Rhode Island, to help them deal with their problems. He continued working on this idea and eventually launched writing workshops in community centers, "attempting to foster literacy, empathy, listening skills, insight, respect, and resolution of conflict." He believes writing exercises are especially effective because "they serve to highlight the problem in a way that it can be dealt with."

=== Cross-cultural educator ===
Simckes has tried to bring all his talents and experiences to bear in his efforts among Israelis and Palestinians. He made "fostering cross-cultural insights and empathy" in the "interlocked perspectives surrounding the Arab/Israeli encounter" the core of his Fulbright year in Israel, at the University of Haifa.

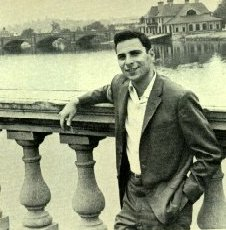
Simckes standing on bridge over Charles River, Cambridge, Massachusetts, 1963

Among his initiatives were a creative writing seminar, "The Mirror of Fiction", and a two-way live interactive video workshop, "Celebrating Differences", broadcast on February 27, 1996. The live interactive TV seminar linked American high school students in the United States with Jewish and Arab students (both Israeli and Palestinian) in Israel. "He created a live bridge and prompted the participants to share their experiences on handling differences," helping the students gain new insights about one another.

To prepare for the Israeli video program, broadcast through the Massachusetts Corporation for Educational Telecommunications, Simckes made frequent visits to Nazareth, Beit Hagefen, and Jish to find students who were comfortable with writing spontaneously, and sharing their writing on the air—and prepared to listen, not just "to yell at each other."

==== Use of language ====
Simckes has strong feelings about the use of English in workshops that involve both Israeli and Palestinians, because it is a "bridge language" and a "diffuser of power" in a political sense, interrupting "the implication of power through language."

He believes that the ability to listen is critical to both writing and healing, and hopes his writing workshops strengthen that skill. If people "can hear each other," he says, "they become a community."

From 2019 to 2020 he taught the Bar Ilan University course "A Prose Laboratory," focusing on spontaneous writing.

== Awards ==
His awards include two National Endowment of the Arts fellowships and the 1991 National Jewish Book Award in the Children's Literature category. Simckes received the Best Actor award for his performance in the award-winning comedy short-film, Kvetch.

== Books ==
=== As an author ===
- Seven Days of Mourning, Random House, 1963, Library of Congress Catalog Number 63–16151
- The Comatose Kids, University of Alabama Press, 1975, ISBN 978-0-914590-19-4

=== As a translator ===
- Semel, N. (1990). Becoming Gershona (L.S. Simckes, Trans.). Viking Children's Books. ISBN 978-0670831050
- Gouri, H. (1999). The Chocolate Deal (L.S. Simckes, Trans.). Wayne State University Press. ISBN 978-0814328002
- Kaniuk, Y. (2001). Commander of the Exodus (L.S. Simckes, Trans.). Grove Press. ISBN 978-0802138088
