= Adam Resurrected =

2008 film by Paul Schrader

Adam Resurrected אדם בן כלב Ein Leben für ein Leben
- Theatrical release poster
- Directed by: Paul Schrader
- Screenplay by: Noah Stollman
- Based on: Adam Resurrected by Yoram Kaniuk
- Produced by: Ehud Bleiberg; Werner Wirsing
- Starring: Jeff Goldblum; Willem Dafoe; Derek Jacobi; Ayelet Zurer
- Cinematography: Sebastian Edschmid
- Edited by: Sandy Saffeels
- Music by: Gabriel Yared
- Production companies: Bleiberg Entertainment; 3L Filmproduktion
- Distributed by: Image Entertainment (United States); 3L Filmverleih (Germany); United King Films (Israel)
- Release dates: December 12, 2008 (United States); February 19, 2009 (Germany)
- Running time: 106 minutes
- Countries: Germany; United States; Israel
- Languages: English; German

Adam Resurrected (other titles: Hebrew: אדם בן כלב, romanized: Adam Ben Kelev, German: Ein Leben für ein Leben: "Life for Life") is a 2008 drama film directed by Paul Schrader and written by Noah Stollman, based on the 1969 novel of the same name by Israeli author Yoram Kaniuk. The Hebrew title literally translates to Adam, Son of a Dog. (Note: A pun lost in translation: in Hebrew, "Adam" also means "man", so the title may also be read as "A Man, Son of a Dog". Also "ben kelev/kalba" is a Hebrew swear akin to "son of a bitch".)

The film tells the story of a Jewish man who, before the Holocaust, was considered Germany's greatest entertainer. He is forced by a concentration camp commander to live like a dog and entertain those condemned to death. After the war, in the early 1960s, he is hospitalized in a psychiatric institution for Holocaust survivors in the Judean Desert.

== Premise ==
The film, part of which is told through a series of flashbacks, follows the story of Adam Stein, a charismatic patient of a fictitious psychiatric asylum for Holocaust survivors in Israel, in 1961. Adam was a comedian in Berlin prior to the Second World War, during which he was sent to a concentration camp. Adam managed to survive the war only because his pre-war act was recalled by an SS officer, who took Adam as his "pet," forcing him to act like a dog (as he did during one of his sketches). His humiliation was his ticket to survival, as he was even forced to play the fiddle as his wife and daughter were led to the gas chambers. Outwardly charming and witty, Adam is tormented by survivor's guilt and delusions that he is a dog. While at the institution, he engages in a romantic relationship with a nurse, takes on a quasi-mentor role for a younger patient sharing a similar delusion of being a dog, and undergoes a profound revelation of psychic ability during a religious ecstasy, seeing himself as a potential messiah for the other patients.

== Cast ==
- Jeff Goldblum as Adam Stein
- Willem Dafoe as Commandant Klein
- Derek Jacobi as Nathan Gross
- Ayelet Zurer as Gina Grey
- Hana Laszlo as Rachel Shwester
- Joachim Król as Abe Wolfowitz
- Jenya Dodina as Gretchen Stein
- Veronica Ferres as Frau Fogel

== Release ==
The film was screened at several film festivals, including Telluride, Toronto, Mill Valley, AFI, Haifa Film Festival, Valladolid Film Festival, the Palm Springs International Film Festival and the London Jewish Film Festival. It was released in Germany on January 22, 2009.

== Reception ==
Adam Resurrected received a mixed response from critics. Film review aggregator Rotten Tomatoes reported an approval rating of 35%, based on 37 reviews, with a rating average of 5.2/10. The site's critical consensus reads: "Such an unusual tale might have made for a compelling drama, but Adam Resurrected suffers from narrative confusion and an emotional detachment at its core." The website Metacritic gave the film a weighted average score of 58 out of 100, based on 8 critics, indicating "mixed or average" reviews.

Adam Resurrected received several positive reviews. Gary Goldstein of the Los Angeles Times wrote: "In a less competitive year, Jeff Goldblum would have had a shot at an Oscar nod for his performance in Adam Resurrected, in which he plays Adam Stein, a mental patient irrevocably haunted by his Holocaust survival. This original drama is less glum than it might sound, thanks to Goldblum's spirited, go-for-broke portrayal and director Paul Schrader's distinctive translation of Noah Stollman's script."

Nathan Rabin of The A.V. Club graded the film a B, also praising Goldblum, whom he credits with a "stunning lead performance." He compared the film's concept with the "notorious unreleased Jerry Lewis monstrosity" that is The Day the Clown Cried, but that Goldblum's performance made Adam Resurrected work. Rabin writes: "Goldblum sells this wildly theatrical character through sheer magnetism. The otherworldly nature of his restless, nervous charisma has seldom been put to better use. Even when it flies off the rails deep into its third act, Resurrected remains strangely hypnotic."

F. X. Feeney of LA Weekly gave a rave review. He compared the film's structure to Federico Fellini's classic 8½, writing: "Where Fellini made ecstasy contagious, Schrader is after much darker vistas — the mystery of how good men fail, and condemn themselves. One cannot recommend this film strongly enough."

Stephen Holden of The New York Times gave the film a negative review, finding it unfunny and full of missed opportunities. "Savage gallows humor might have substituted for pathos. But Adam Resurrected feels so detached that there is not a laugh, nor even a wicked smirk of nihilistic glee, to be gleaned."

== See also ==
- Ghetto Fighters' House § "Mengele's dog"
