= Eagles (2012 film) =

2012 film

- Film poster
- Directed by: Dror Sabo
- Written by: Daphna Levin
- Cinematography: Tomer Shani
- Edited by: Ofer Zar
- Release date: 9 September 2012 (TIFF)
- Running time: 99 minutes
- Country: Israel
- Language: Hebrew

Eagles (Hebrew title: Hebrew: נבלות, romanized: Nevelot) is a 2012 Israeli drama film directed by Dror Sabo based on the novella Scums (Hebrew: נבלות) by Yoram Kaniuk. It is the re-release of the 2010 Israeli 5-part TV miniseries with the same name aired by Hot Telecom.

In 2011 the miniseries won the Award of the Israeli Television Academy in the category "Best TV Movie, Miniseries or Drama".

== Plot ==
Two elderly war veterans, Efraim and Moshka become vigilantes in Tel-Aviv.

== Cast ==
- Noa Barkai as Dina
- Yehoram Gaon as Moshka
- Yossi Polak as Efraim

== American remake attempts ==
There were two attempts at American remakes, in which the heroes were planned to be two Vietnam War veterans. At first it was sold to HBO network in 2015, to be directed by Alan Poul. In 2018 Apple ordered the remake starring Richard Gere, but cancelled it in 2019.
