= Gina Saputo =

Jazz musical artist

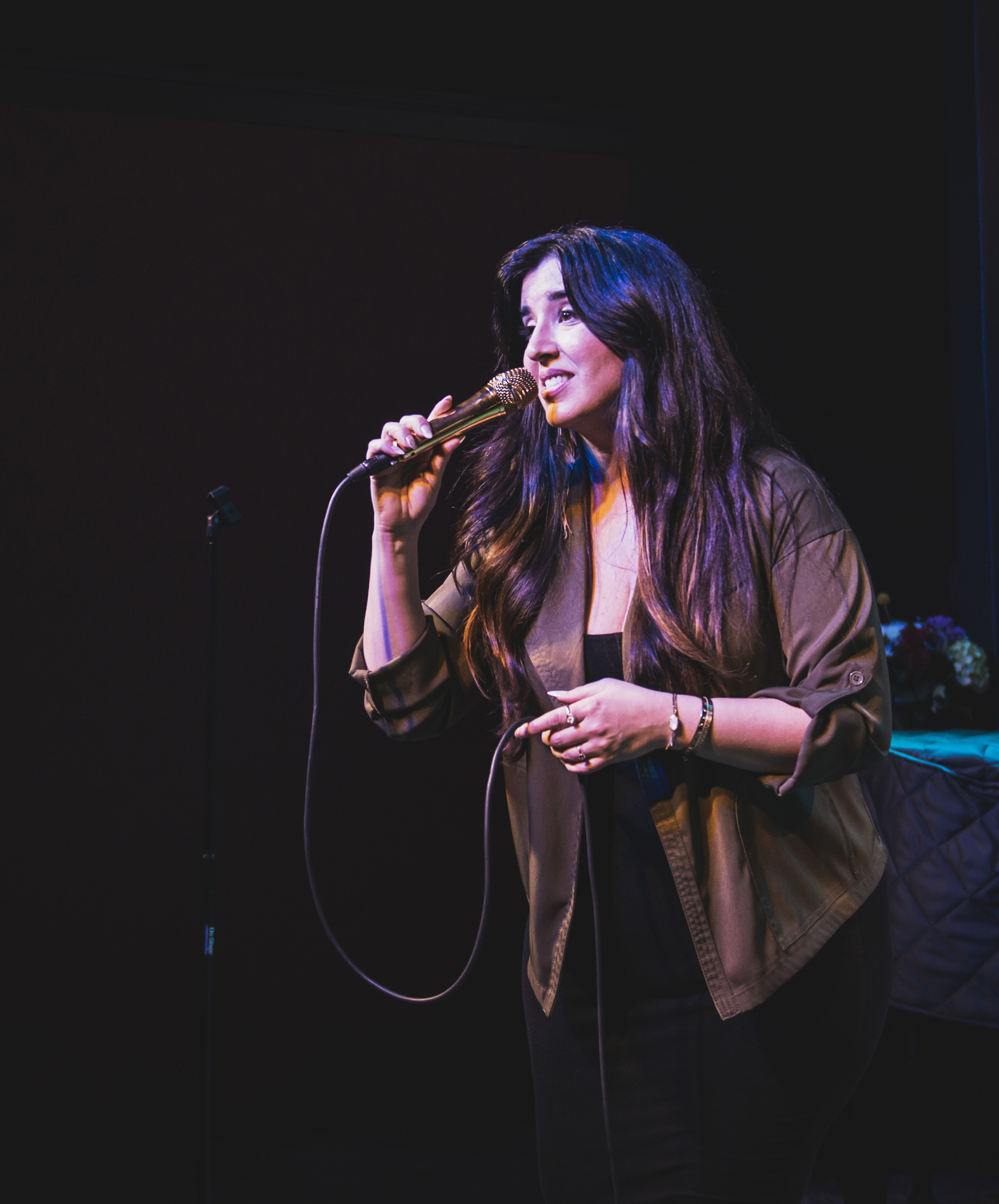
- Saputo performing in 2023

Background information
- Born: April 22, 1981 (age 45); Springfield, Oregon
- Genre: Vocal jazz
- Occupations: Singer, musician, educator
- Years active: 1995–present
- Labels: Swingfest, Musak, Playing Records
- Website: ginasaputo.com

Gina Saputo (born April 22, 1981) is an American jazz singer and educator from Portland, Oregon. Her albums have charted on the Billboard Japan and iTunes Jazz Charts.

== Early life ==
Saputo was born in Springfield, Oregon. She was involved in music at a young age performing with the Oregon Children's Choir. She was influenced by father, Joe Saputo who introduced her to musicians such at Sarah Vaughan, Carmen McRae, and Billie Holiday. By the age of 15 she had put together her own groups and regularly sang at local jazz clubs.

== Career ==
Saputo moved to Los Angeles, California and received a bachelor's degree from University Of Southern California and attended the Thelonious Monk Institute. While there, she was mentored by Herbie Hancock, Wayne Shorter, Terri Lyne Carrington and Tierney Sutton. Saputo has performed all over the world, including for the State Department in Washington, D.C., toured Vietnam with Herbie Hancock, Wayne Shorter and Nnenna Freelon, and multiple tours in Japan, her last with Grammy nominated pianist Bill Cunliffe.

Saputo performs regularly on tour with actor and pianist Jeff Goldblum and the Mildred Snitzer Orchestra, George Kahn Jazz and Blues Revue, Paul Young Quintet, Slide Fx Trombone Tentet, Rusty Stiers Band, Tenth and California, and her own groups.

Saputo has released three albums and two EP, and is a featured singer on many releases including Jeff Goldblum and the Mildred Snitzer Orchestra release I Shouldn't Be Telling You This.

Saputo is an instructor and vocal coach at the Musicians Institute and Santa Monica College.

== Personal life ==
Saputo is married to organist Joe Bagg with whom she has two children, Hazel and Sebastian.

== Discography ==
=== Solo ===
- Gina Saputo Quartet EP (GSJQ Productions, 1998)
- Live At Catalina (GSJQ Productions, 2003)
- Swinging On A Star (GSJQ Productions & Musak Records, 2004)
- Live At The Omni (GSJQ Productions, 2012)
- Women Talk (GSJQ Productions, 2022)
- Daydream (GSJQ Productions, 2025)

=== With Matt Politano ===
- Duetto (Swingfest, 2019)

=== Other appearances ===
- Angels Singing In The Dark - Tenth & California, (2015)
- Jazz & Blues Revue - George Kahn Jazz and Blues Revue (Playing Records, 2014)
- I Shouldn't Be Telling You This - Jeff Goldblum and the Mildred Snitzer Orchestra (Decca, 2020)
- Holiday Soirée - George Kahn Jazz and Blues Revue (Playing Records, 2024)
