= The Last Jew (Kaniuk novel) =

1982 novel by Yoram Kaniuk

- First US edition cover
- Author: Yoram Kaniuk
- Original title: היהודי האחרון
- Translator: Barbara Harshav
- Publisher: Grove Press (English)
- Publication date: 1982
- English publication date: 2 February 2006

The Last Jew (Hebrew: היהודי האחרון, romanized: HaYehudi HaAchron) is a 1982 novel by Israeli writer Yoram Kaniuk. In the novel, Nazi concentration camp survivor's Ebenezer Schneerson's life is spared, after which he cannot remember details from his own life, despite remembering swaths of information regarding Jewish culture and history. An English edition translated by Barbara Harshav was published by Grove Press in 2006.

== Themes ==
The Last Jew discusses many concepts related to Jewish identity, as well as issues related to the creation of Israel following World War II.

== Reception ==
The English edition of The Last Jew was well received by critics, including starred reviews from Booklist and Kirkus Reviews. Despite recommending the novel, the reviewers warned it is "not an easy read" and "not for casual perusal". Despite the harsh realities depicted in the novel, Kirkus found that the ending prompted a "hopeful future".

Kirkus Reviews referred to the novel as a "rich, demanding, life-affirming masterpiece", while Library Journal's Molly Abramowitz called it "a brilliant tour de force". Kirkus Reviews, Booklist, and Publishers Weekly compared the novel to works by William Faulkner and James Joyce, with Kirkus pointing to the novel's "Faulknerian dreamlike logic" and Publishers Weekly to the "Joycean stream of consciousness". Booklist's Bryce Christensen specifically mentioned Faulkner's As I Lay Dying and Joyce's Ulysses.

Booklist's Bryce Christensen noted that the novel "makes heavy demands on its readers, compelling them [...] to find a context and meaning for the fractured perceptions and convoluted lives of the characters that confront them. But the readers' struggle for meaning mirrors that of the characters as they wander personal labyrinths, desperately trying to recover and make sense of their dark individual and collective memories". Christensen further wrote that the novel's "disorienting narrative exposes the precariousness of Jewish identity in a hostile world, where betrayal engenders Jewish history and cupidity feeds off of Jewish grief." They ended their review by highlighting how "the reader concludes not with a sense of closure and reassurance but rather with a painful awareness of the unfinished tasks facing a long-beleaguered people."

Publishers Weekly's review focused primary on Kaniuk's writing style, stating, "Kaniuk makes readers work hard to piece together the fragmented story. His headlong, associative sentences, some of which go on for pages, mirror the characters' labyrinthine imaginations, memories, emotions and perceptions, which are all further complicated by the traumas of war".

== Influence ==
The plot of the 1981 film The Vulture was based on chapters from the book.
