= Little Surprises =

- Directed by: Jeff Goldblum
- Written by: Lloyd Fonvielle
- Produced by: Tikki Goldberg
- Starring: Christine Cavanaugh; Julie Harris; Mark Pellegrino; Kelly Preston
- Cinematography: Jerzy Zieliński
- Edited by: Lisa Bromwell
- Music by: Bennie Wallace
- Production company: Chanticleer Films
- Release date: October 1996
- Running time: 36 minutes
- Country: United States
- Language: English

Little Surprises (also known as The Best Night, The Red Eye) is a 1996 American short film directed by Jeff Goldblum. The film was nominated for an Academy Award for Best Live Action Short Film.

== Cast ==
- Christine Cavanaugh as Pepper
- Julie Harris as Ethel
- Kenneth Moskow as Julian
- Mark Pellegrino as Jack
- Kelly Preston as Ginger
- Rod Steiger as Joe
- Sam Whipple as Joe Jr.

== Home media ==
The film was released on DVD in Australia in "Perverse Destiny, Volume 2" with three other short films:

- Texan (1994), starring Dana Delaney, written by David Mamet
- Museum of Love (1996), starring and directed by Christian Slater
- The Gift (1993), directed by Laura Dern
