= Abraham Berline =

Russian artist

Abraham Berline

Abraham Joseph Berline (5 October 1893 in Nizhyn – 1942) was a Ukrainian artist who lived in Paris and died during World War II.

Abraham Joseph Berline was born on October 6, 1893, in Nizhyn in the Russian Empire (today in Chernihiv Oblast, Ukraine). He was the son of Leib Berline and Hana Kaganoff. In 1912, at the age of 19, he emigrated to Paris to study at the Ecole des Beaux Arts. He supported himself by driving a taxi. His work was highly regarded and exhibited at the most prestigious Parisian salons: Salon d'Automne, Salon des Indépendants, Salon des Tuileries, the Paul Appel Gallery, and in private galleries.

When France was invaded, Berline joined the Resistance, but in May 1941 Berline was arrested in the Billet Vert operation and interned as a Russian Jew in Compiègne internment camp. He continued to produce work, mainly pastels, focusing on the beauty of nature, in an attempt to transcend the camp experience through art. These paintings were shown in the camp along with other artists' work. After seven months he was transferred to Drancy internment camp, and from there to Auschwitz, as was his wife Doucia—never to return. His works are included in the art collection of the Ghetto Fighters' House Museum and the Musée d'Histoire Contemporaine in Paris.
