= Adam Resurrected (novel) =

1969 novel by Yoram Kaniuk

Adam Resurrected (Hebrew: אדם בן כלב, romanized: Adam ben Kelev) is a 1969 novel by Israeli author Yoram Kaniuk. The Hebrew title literally translates to Adam, Son of a Dog. (Note: A pun lost in translation: in Hebrew, "Adam" also means "man", so the title "Adam Ben Kelev" may also be read as "A Man, Son of a Dog". Also "ben kelev/kalba" is a Hebrew swear akin to "son of a bitch".) The novel tells a story of a Holocaust survivor, a Jewish German clown Adam Stein who had to play this role in the Nazi extermination camp, in particular, he had to act as camp commandant's dog. Stein's strong inner identification with a dog prevents him from the integration into the society of Israel. Due to its many allegorical meanings, the novel is often compared to One Hundred Years of Solitude.

It was translated into English by Seymour Simckes in 1971.

== Plot ==
The story is set in a psychiatric hospital in Arad, where Adam Stein was placed after the immigration to the Land of Israel.

== Adaptations ==
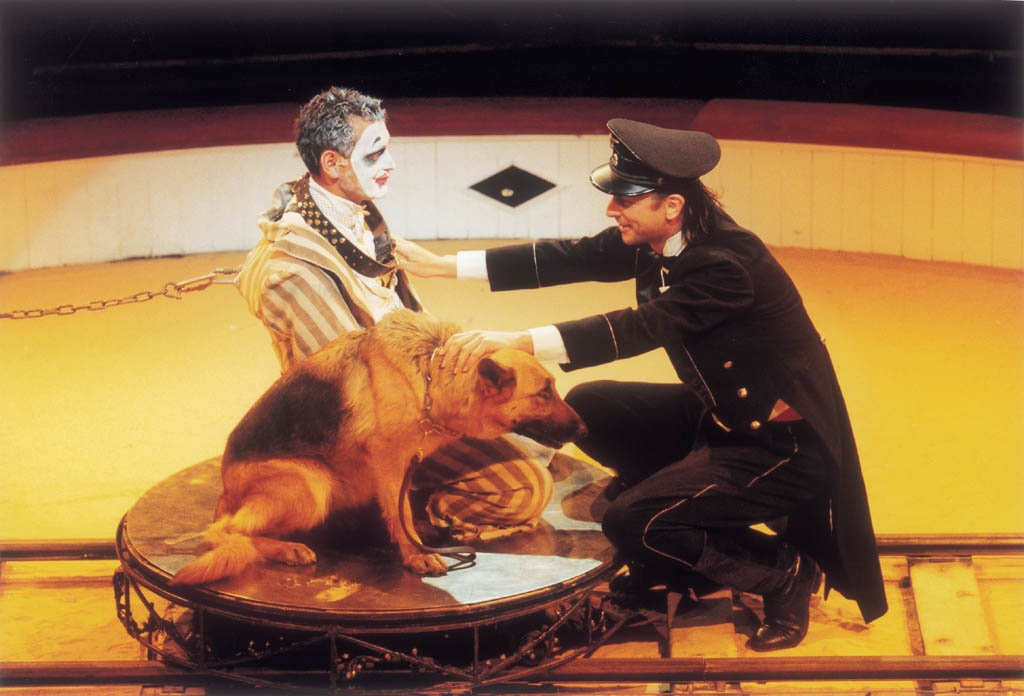
A scene from the play; Israel (Sasha) Demidov as Adam (Note: See more in commons:Category:Gesher Theatre)

In 1993, a play was staged in the Gesher Theater directed by Yevgeny Aryeh based on the adaptation of the book into a play by Alexander Chervinsky and translated into Hebrew by Mark Ivanir. The play run in Israel and abroad with success for a long time.

In 2008, a drama film based on the novel was released with the same name.

== See also ==
- Ghetto Fighters' House § "Mengele's dog"
