= Yoram Kaniuk =

Israeli writer, painter, journalist, and theatre critic (1930–2013)

- יורם קניוק
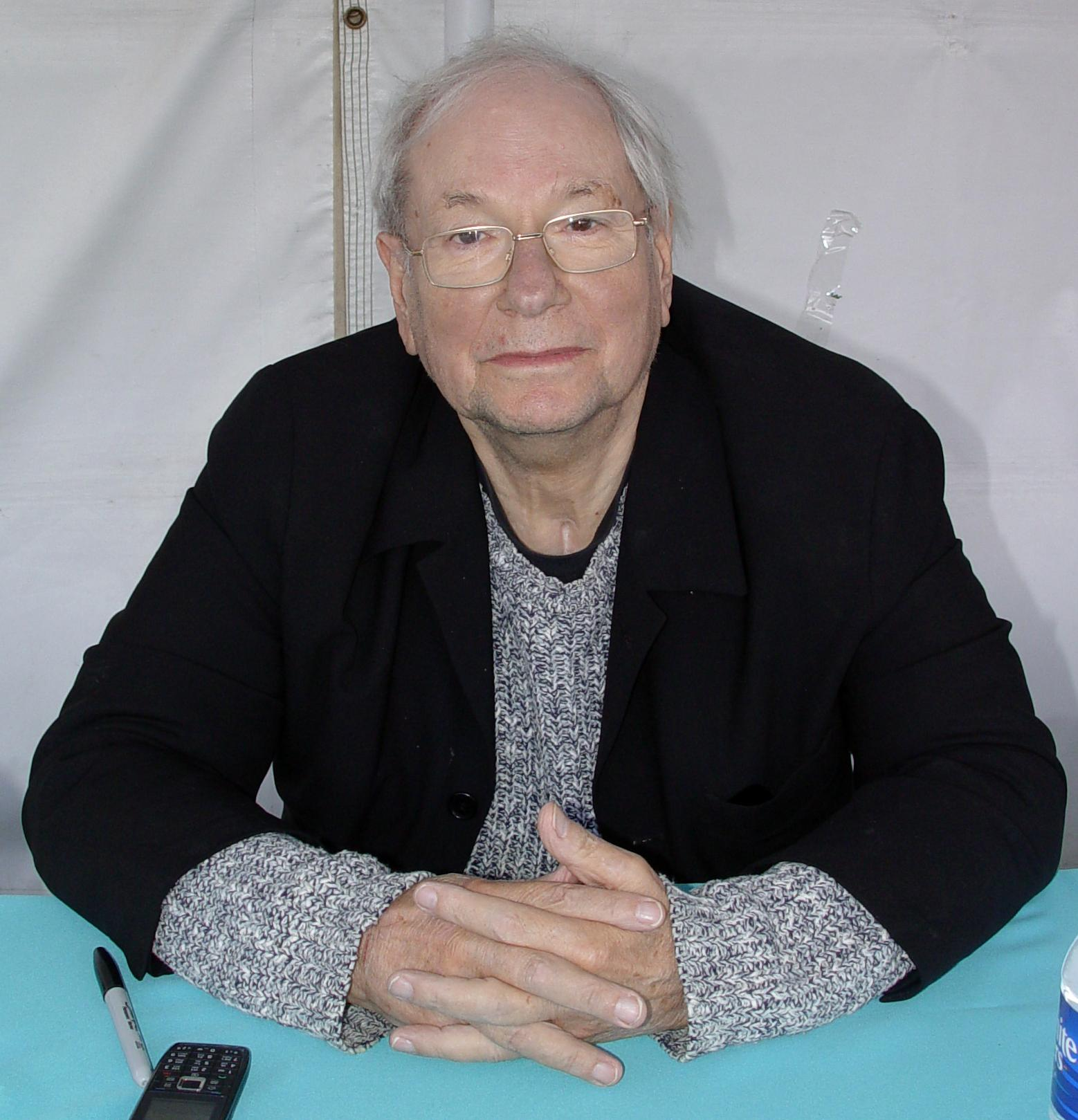
- Born: May 2, 1930; Tel Aviv, Mandatory Palestine
- Died: June 8, 2013 (aged 83); Tel Aviv, Israel
- Occupations: Writer, painter, journalist, theatre critic
- Years active: 1963-2013
- Notable work: The Last Jew
- Spouse: Miranda Baker (m. 1958)
- Children: 2

Yoram Kaniuk (Hebrew: יורם קניוק; May 2, 1930 – June 8, 2013) was an Israeli writer, painter, journalist, and theatre critic.

== Biography ==
Yoram Kaniuk was born in Tel Aviv. His father, Moshe Kaniuk, was the first curator of Tel Aviv Museum of Art and was born in Ternopil, Galicia, which is now in Ukraine but was then part of the Austro-Hungarian Empire, in the Austrian partition of Poland. His grandfather was a Hebrew teacher who wrote his own textbooks. Kaniuk's mother, born in Odessa, was also a teacher. Her family immigrated to Palestine in 1909, the year Tel Aviv was founded, and settled in Neve Tzedek, which has become part of the established Tel Aviv. Later they moved to Kiryat Meir, and later to Ben Yehuda Street.

Kaniuk attended Tichon Hadash high school in Tel Aviv. In 1947, at the age of 17, Kaniuk joined the Palmach. In 1948, during the War of Independence, he took part in several battles and was shot in the legs by an Englishman in a keffiyeh, but then the Englishman rescued him and he was treated at the British Mount Sinai Hospital.

In 1958 while living in the USA, Kaniuk married Miranda Baker, a Christian woman, and returned to Israel with her. They had two daughters, Aya and Naomi.

Kaniuk was an anti-war activist who advocated for a peaceful solution to the Israeli–Palestinian conflict.

He befriended Charlie Parker in New York City in the fifties and made out with Billie Holiday, who wrote him a song. He brought Holocaust survivors to Israel on the SS Pan York, and fought his way into besieged Jerusalem. He was wounded in battle. He buried friends whose names he didn’t know. He had been spared death by the good graces of a British sniper, and stripped of his sabra arrogance by a story a young man told him about pulling diamonds from the rectums of his dead parents in order to stay alive in Nazi-occupied Europe.

— Mitch Ginsburg

Kaniuk died of cancer on June 8, 2013, at the age of 83. After his death, his body was donated to science.

=== Civil status ===
In May 2011, Kaniuk petitioned the Israeli Interior Ministry to change his religion status from "Jewish" to "no religion". The petition came after the birth of his grandson, Omri, who was registered as having "no religion" due to not being Jewish under the Halakhic definition used by Israeli civil law. He cited the fact that his child and infant grandson, because they are descended from a mixed Jewish/Christian marriage, are legally unclassified in terms of religion, and his desire not to belong to a "Jewish Iran" or "what is today called the religion of Israel." On September 27, 2011, judge Gideon Ginat of the Tel Aviv District Court approved his petition and ordered the change of his record of religion to "no religion" in his record in the Population Administration Register. The Rabbinate retained a veto over his status.

Hundreds of other Israelis expressed an intention to do the same; a new Hebrew verb, lehitkaniuk ("to Kaniuk oneself", "to Kaniukize", Hebrew: להתקניוק, a pun with "lehitraot", Hebrew: לְהִתְרָאוֹת, a parting phrase) was coined to refer to this process.

== Literary career ==
Kaniuk has published 17 novels, a memoir, seven collections of short stories, two books of essays and five books for children and youth. His books have been published in 25 languages and he has won numerous literary prizes.

An international conference dedicated to the works of Kaniuk was held at Cambridge University in March 2006.

== Literary themes and style ==
'Eagles' is a war story that attacks the subject of death in Israeli culture from a unique angle. His work has been described as "existential writing that deviates from the Israeli consensus" and difficult to categorize.

He is known for the dark, somewhat bizarre humor in his writing. The late writers Anthony Burgess and Kurt Vonnegut have influenced his unsettling style of political satire. He was widely rejected by the Israeli mainstream until the 21st century, when many young readers found his unique take on the sensitive Israeli social climate refreshing.

== Awards and honours ==
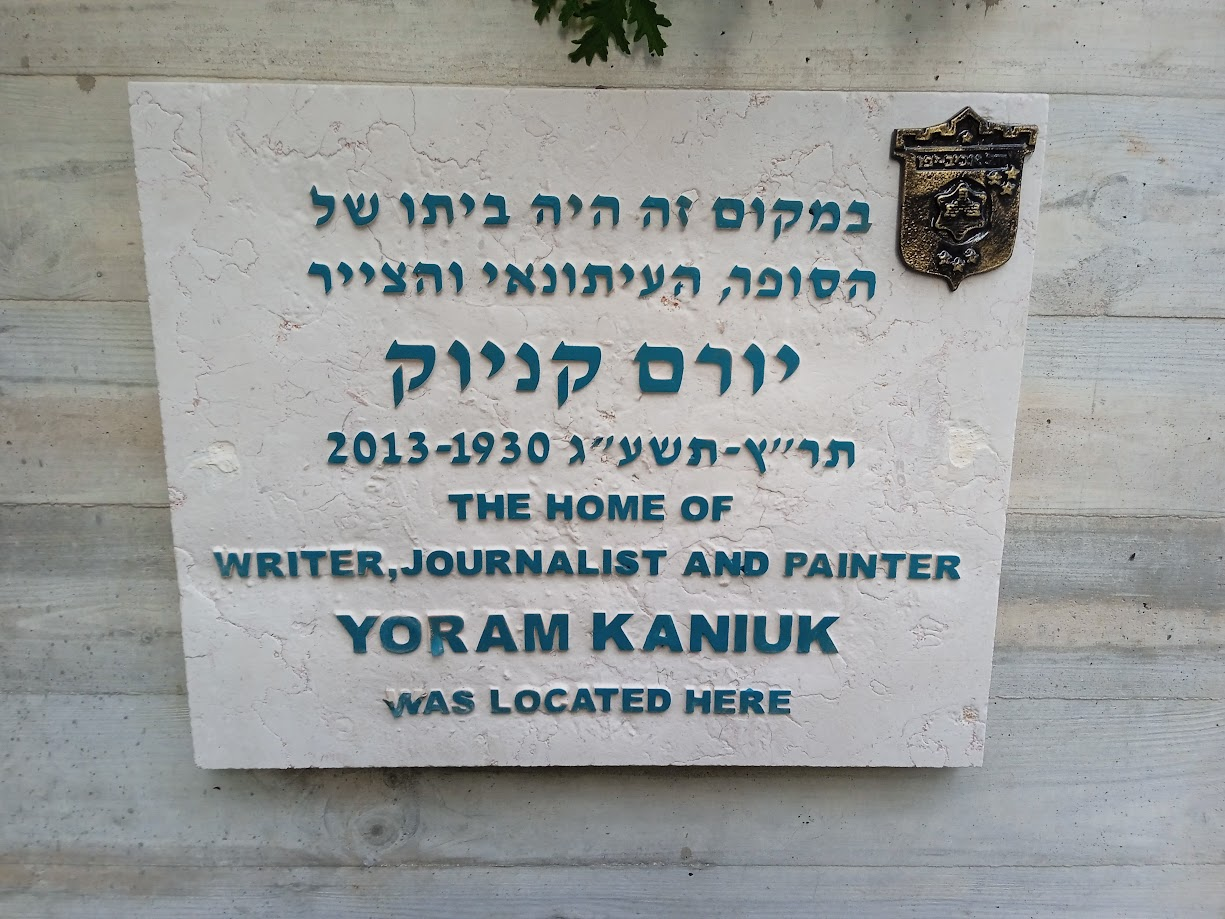
A memorial plaque at the location of his home at 13 Bilu Street, Tel Aviv

Kaniuk has won numerous literary prizes, including the following:

- In 1980, the Ze'ev Prize for Children's Literature for The House Where the Cockroaches Live to a Ripe Old Age
- In 1997, Prix des Droits de l'homme de la République française.
- In 1998, President's Award for Literature.
- In 1999, the Bialik Prize for literature (co-recipient with Aharon Almog and Nurit Zarchi).
- In 2000, the Prix Mediterranee Etranger for Commander of the Exodus.
- In 2005, the Book Publishers Association's Gold Book Prize.
- In 2006, the Neuman Prize.
- 2008: Kugel Prize for lifetime achievement
- In 2011, the Sapir Prize for Literature for 1948.
- 2011: officer of the Ordre des Arts et des Lettres, France for the book 1948

== Works ==
- The Acrophile (1960)
- Himmo, King of Jerusalem (1968)
  Adapted into the film with the same name
- Adam Resurrected (he:אדם בן כלב, Adam, Son of a Dog) (novel, 1969, translated in 1971)
  The film Adam Resurrected is based on the novel
- Rockinghorse (1977) ISBN 0-06-012245-5
- The Story of Aunt Shlomzion the Great (1978) ISBN 0-06-012259-5
- 1979: The House Where Cockroaches Live to a Ripe Old Age (English translation by Miranda Kaniuk: 2001) ISBN 81-7655-041-8
  The story is about a little girl Naomi who loves animals and her house has a cat, kittens, dogs, horse, turtle, porcupine, pigeon, aquarium fish, and cockroaches. Naomi even forbids her father to kill mosquitos with a spray.
  A 60-minute documentary about Yoram Kaniuk was produced under this title by Ma'agalot Productions, Tel Aviv in 1996.
- Confessions of a Good Arab (1984; 1988 translation: ISBN 0-8076-1210-3); the original title Hebrew: ערבי טוב, romanized: Arabi Tov translates as "A Good Arab".
  Written in the voice Yosef Sharara (שרארה יוסף and first published under this pen name), a half-Jew by mother and half-Palestinian Arab by father, the book explores the problems of dual ethnicity in Israel.
- His Daughter (1987) ISBN 0-8076-1215-4
- Wasserman (וסרמן) (1988), a children's book about a stray dog who finds a good home
  There is a 1995 German film Wasserman – Der singende Hund (Wasserman, a Singing Dog) with screenplay by Peter Lilienthal based on Kaniuk's book
- Tiger Hill (טייגרהיל) (1995)
  A mystery novel; the heroes " try to decipher the mysterious connection between the Tiger Hill - an immigration ship that ran aground in 1939 by the coast of Tel Aviv, the explosion, a dead cat and an unrequited lover, a former labor battalion man, and the murder in the cafe."
  Translated in French as Comme chiens et chats (1996) and in Italian as Tigerhill
- Commander of the Exodus (1999) ISBN 0-8021-1664-7, translated in English by Seymour Simckes
  The book chronicles the life of the captain of SS Exodus Yossi Harel, who brought four loads of Holocaust survivors to Palestine, based in the interviews with Harel
  The original book (ISBN 965-378-062-X) has title translated in English as Exodus: Commander's Odissey.
- Life on Sandpaper (2003) ISBN 9781564786135
- The Last Jew (novel, 1982; eng tr 2006) ISBN 0-8021-1811-9
  A controversial 1981 film The Vulture is based on chapters from the novel
- Eagles and Scums (2006), a two-part book
  - Eagles (short story), about his experience of being injured and abandoned after the lost Battle of Nebi Semwil (1948). His experiences in the battle were later detailed in the novel 1948
  - Scums (Hebrew: נבלות) (novella)
    Eagles (2012 film) is based on Scums: two elderly ex-soldiers, Efraim and Moshka become vigilantes in Tel-Aviv (it was a TV miniseries in Israel)
- 2001, 2004 The Last Berliner
  Printed in Germany as Der letzte Berliner in 2001, 2002, in France as Le dernier Berlinois in 2003, and in Israel in 2004
- 2007: Between Life and Death (novel); English translation by Barbara Harshav: 2016
  An autobiographical novel, reflections on his life and work, based on the experience of being in coma and subsequent half-trance
- 2010: 1948 (Hebrew: תש"ח, Tasha"h) (fictionalized autobiographical novel)
