= Kellie Pickler discography =

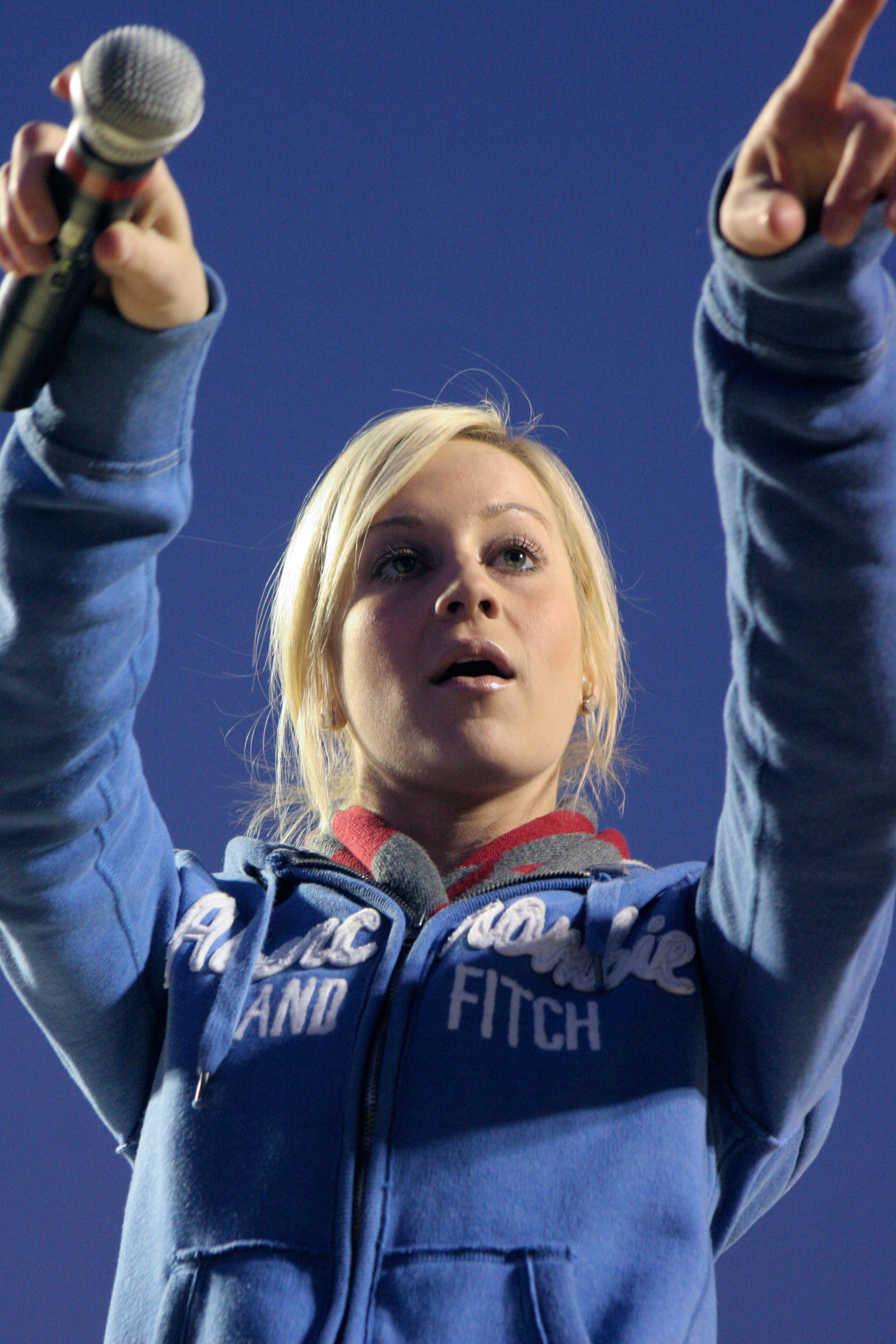
- Pickler performing on the United Service Organization's Holiday Tour in December 2009
- Studio albums: 4
- Compilation albums: 1
- Singles: 12
- Music videos: 11
- Promotional singles: 4

American country music singer Kellie Pickler has released four studio albums, one compilation album, 12 singles and 11 music videos.

Kellie Pickler's debut album Small Town Girl was released in October 2006, and has been certified gold by the RIAA for U.S. sales of 500,000 copies. It produced three Top 20 singles on the Billboard Hot Country Songs charts in "Red High Heels", "I Wonder" and "Things That Never Cross a Man's Mind". Her first single of her self-titled second album is "Don't You Know You're Beautiful", which was followed by "Best Days of Your Life", her first Top Ten hit, and "Didn't You Know How Much I Loved You". "Makin' Me Fall in Love Again" was released as the fourth single in April 2010. A Christmas song, "Santa Baby", released on the Hear Something Country Christmas album, charted from unsolicited airplay in late 2007.

Her third studio album, 100 Proof, was released January 24, 2012 and produced two low-charting singles: "Tough" in 2011 and the title track in 2012. In late 2012, Pickler signed a new contract with Black River Entertainment and released her fourth album's lead single, "Someone Somewhere Tonight" the following spring; "Little Bit Gypsy" and "Closer to Nowhere" followed. The album, The Woman I Am, was her lowest-charting record on the Billboard Top Country Albums chart but topped the Independent Albums chart.

== Albums ==
=== Studio albums ===
List of studio albums, with selected chart positions, sales figures and certifications
Title	Album details	Peak positions			Certifications	Sales
Title	Album details	US Country	US	US Indie	Certifications	Sales
Small Town Girl	Release date: October 31, 2006; Label: BNA Records, 19; Formats: CD, music download	1	9	—	RIAA: Gold	US: 900,000
Kellie Pickler	Release date: September 30, 2008; Label: BNA Records, 19; Formats: CD, music download	1	9	—		US: 470,000
100 Proof	Release date: January 24, 2012; Label: BNA Records, 19; Formats: CD, music download	2	7	—		US: 90,000
The Woman I Am	Release date: November 11, 2013; Label: Black River Entertainment; Formats: CD, music download, vinyl	4	19	1		US: 60,000
"—" denotes releases that did not chart

=== Compilation albums ===
Title	Details
Playlist: The Very Best of Kellie Pickler	Release date: May 27, 2014; Label: Legacy Recordings; Formats: CD, music download

== Singles ==
Year	Single	Peak positions					Certifications	Album
Year	Single	US Country Songs	US Country Airplay	US	CAN Country	CAN	Certifications	Album
2006	"Red High Heels"	15		64	31	—	RIAA: Gold	Small Town Girl
2007	"I Wonder"	14		75	—	—		Small Town Girl
2007	"Things That Never Cross a Man's Mind"	16		96	33	—		Small Town Girl
2008	"Don't You Know You're Beautiful"	21		— (Note: "Don't You Know You're Beautiful" did not enter the Billboard Hot 100, but did peak at number three on the Bubbling Under Hot 100 Singles extension chart.)	33	—		Kellie Pickler
2008	"Best Days of Your Life"	9		46	23	99	RIAA: Platinum	Kellie Pickler
2009	"Didn't You Know How Much I Loved You"	14		97	49	—		Kellie Pickler
2010	"Makin' Me Fall in Love Again"	30		—	—	—		Kellie Pickler
2011	"Tough"	30		— (Note: "Tough" did not enter the Billboard Hot 100, but did peak at number 19 on the Bubbling Under Hot 100 Singles extension chart.)	—	—		100 Proof
2012	"100 Proof"	50		—	—	—		100 Proof
2013	"Someone Somewhere Tonight"	—	49	—	—	—		The Woman I Am
2013	"Little Bit Gypsy"	49	50	—	—	—		The Woman I Am
2014	"Closer to Nowhere"	—	59	—	—	—		The Woman I Am
"—" denotes releases that did not chart

=== Promotional singles ===
Year	Single	Peak positions	Album
Year	Single	US Country Songs	Album
2007	"Santa Baby"	33	Hear Something Country Christmas
2013	"The Man with the Bag"	—	Non-album singles
2015	"Feeling Tonight"	—	Non-album singles
2017	"If It Wasn't for a Woman"	—	Non-album singles
"—" denotes releases that did not chart

== Music videos ==
Year	Video	Director	Ref.
2006	"Red High Heels"	Chris Hicky	
2007	"I Wonder"	Deaton Flanigen	
2008	"Don't You Know You're Beautiful"	Deaton Flanigen	
2009	"Best Days of Your Life" (with Taylor Swift)	Roman White	
2009	"Didn't You Know How Much I Loved You"	Roman White	
2009	"Santa Baby"	Eric Welch	
2010	"Makin' Me Fall in Love Again"	Roman White	
2011	"Tough"	Roman White	
2013	"Someone Somewhere Tonight"	Roman White	
2013	"The Man with the Bag"	Paul Miller	
2014	"Bad Boys Get Me Good" (Jasmine Rae featuring Kellie Pickler)	Duncan Toombs	

== Other album appearances ==
Year	Song	Album
2006	"Walkin' After Midnight"	American Idol Season 5: Encores
2011	"Rockin' Around the Christmas Tree"	A Very Country Christmas
2013	"Bad Boys Get Me Good" (Jasmine Rae featuring Kellie Pickler)	If I Want To
