= Makin' Me Fall in Love Again =

Single by Kellie Pickler

from the album Kellie Pickler
- Released: April 19, 2010
- Recorded: 2008
- Genre: Country
- Length: 3:26
- Label: BNA
- Songwriters: Karyn Rochelle; James T. Slater; Shane Stevens
- Producer: Chris Lindsey

Kellie Pickler singles chronology
| "Didn't You Know How Much I Loved You" (2009) | "Makin' Me Fall in Love Again" (2010) | "Tough" (2011) |

Music video
- "Makin' Me Fall in Love Again on YouTube

"Makin' Me Fall in Love Again" is a song written by Karyn Rochelle, James T. Slater and Shane Stevens, and recorded by American country music artist Kellie Pickler. It was released in April 2010 as the fourth and final single from her self-titled second album. The song is about someone being in love and still having that feeling, despite being told that it will fade away. Pickler said that it reflected her current relationship.

The song received positive reviews from critics who praised Pickler's vocal performance and the catchy production. "Makin' Me Fall in Love Again" peaked at number 30 on the Billboard Hot Country Songs chart. An accompanying music video for the song, directed by Roman White, was set in the 1940s where Pickler and members of the USO perform in outfits resembling fashions from that era.

== Content ==
"Makin' Me Fall in Love Again" is an up-tempo song, featuring a production with prominent electric guitar. The song's female narrator describes being in love and despite being told that it will fade, she finds the love rejuvenating every moment she spends with her significant other, as if he's "makin' [her] fall in love again" each time.

In an interview with The Boot, Kellie Pickler felt the song was a reflection of her current relationship. She also noted that the song was almost not included on the record: "We were ready to send [the album] off to be mastered and to get it ready to be packaged for the shelves, but ["Makin' Me Fall in Love Again"] just made it barely. I was actually surprised how it did make it on there. I'm glad it did ... It completed the record."

== Critical reception ==
Jim Malec of The 9513 gave the song a thumbs up, favoring her vocals, which "are more assured and confident than ever as she somehow breathes life into a set of generally abhorrent lyrics." He also complimented the "simple truth of the hook" and the "unusually sparse production," concluding that it was "another solid addition to her catalog." Matt Bjorke of Roughstock spoke positively of the song, describing it as "perfect for the lighter, feel-good summer radio playlists," suggesting that with its "catchy melody" it has the "potential to be Kellie Pickler’s biggest hit to date." He also compared it to something Pickler's "idol Dolly Parton might have recorded." Kevin John Coyne of Country Universe gave the song a C rating, comparing it to cotton candy: "It’s like they got the color and the texture right but forgot to put the sugar in the cotton candy."

== Music video ==
The music video, which was directed by Roman White, was filmed in Los Angeles, California in April 2010, and premiered on GAC on May 14, 2010 and May 17, 2010 on CMT. In the video, Pickler is shown surrounded by members of the USO, and performing in various outfits that resemble fashions of the 1940s. The video's concept was chosen by Pickler, because she felt the 1940s celebrated the female figure: "I don’t feel there was a pressure to be skinny and so deathly looking as what the pressure is now. The women were more ‘womanly’-looking. They had curves. They had beautiful fair skin. It was just more natural."

== Chart performance ==
"Makin' Me Fall in Love Again" debuted at number 53 on the U.S. Billboard Hot Country Songs chart for the week of May 8, 2010. After eleven weeks, the song reached a peak of number 30 on the chart for the week dated July 17, 2010.

| Chart (2010) | Peak position |
|---|---|
| US Hot Country Songs (Billboard) | 30 |

== Sales ==
United States: 72,000
