= Don't You Know You're Beautiful =

Single by Kellie Pickler

from the album Kellie Pickler
- Released: June 9, 2008
- Genre: Country pop
- Length: 3:19
- Label: BNA
- Songwriters: Chris Lindsey; Karyn Rochelle; Aimee Mayo
- Producer: Chris Lindsey

Kellie Pickler singles chronology
"Things That Never Cross a Man's Mind" (2007)	"Don't You Know You're Beautiful" (2008)	"Best Days of Your Life" (2008)

Music video
- "Don't You Know You're Beautiful" on YouTube

"Don't You Know You're Beautiful" is a song written by Chris Lindsey, Aimee Mayo, and Karyn Rochelle (who co-wrote her previous hits "Red High Heels" and "I Wonder"), and recorded by American country music artist Kellie Pickler. It served as the lead-off single to her self-titled second album. Pickler debuted the song at the 43rd annual Academy of Country Music Awards, and it was officially released to radio in June as the fourth single of her career.

== Content ==
The song is a mid-tempo country pop song, backed by electric guitar with occasional steel guitar fills, in which the narrator assures other females that they are beautiful just as they are. In the first verse, she addresses a fifteen-year-old girl in tattered clothes, telling her "Now I know you'd give anything just to fit in / But your worth ain't on a price tag, it comes from within." The second verse addresses a homecoming queen, whom the narrator tells to keep her innocence. The third verse is addressed to a wife, who was left by her husband, because he preferred a younger woman: "Let him go, let him fly, keep your head up, get on with your life."

== Critical reception ==
The song has received mixed reception from music critics. Matt Bjorke, in his review of Kellie Pickler for the Roughstock website, said, "'Don’t You Know You’re Beautiful' is a song that speaks right to those little girls that admire Kellie. She wanted to give them something that they could listen to and know that everything’s alright. While some traditionalists would say that the song isn’t country, I firmly believe it is because it speaks of real life." Jennifer Webb of About.com reviewed the single favorably, saying, "'Don’t You Know You’re Beautiful' is something that should be said to every little girl as well as grown up women. Don't depend on others to tell you how wonderful you are - that strength should come from within. Stay true to yourself and you can do anything you set your mind to."

Brady Vercher of Engine 145 gave the song a "thumbs down" rating. He called the first verse "a bit cheesy and generic…commendable despite being underwhelming", but considered the rest of the song both lyrically deficient and derivative of Martina McBride's 2003 single "This One's for the Girls" (which also contains the lyric "you're beautiful the way you are" and was also co-written by Aimee Mayo).

"Don't You Know You're Beautiful" was nominated for Female Video of the Year in the 2009 CMT Music Awards.

== Music video ==
Pickler during the sleepover scene.

A music video was released to accompany the song on July 31, 2008. It debuted at number 1 on GAC's Top 20 music countdown and held the top spot for 4 weeks, before falling to number 2 behind Carrie Underwood's "Just a Dream".

In the video, Pickler is seen singing with various women around her in different situations, including at the roller skating rink, a sleepover, and at a children's hospital. She also performs the song in a chair and sitting on high school athletic bleachers. Clips of a swim team, mechanic, and other girls are mixed in with these scenes throughout the video.

The video is featured on the bonus album included in the deluxe edition of Kellie Pickler.

== Chart performance ==
"Don't You Know You're Beautiful" debuted at number 59 on the U.S. Billboard Hot Country Songs chart in June 2008. It reached a peak of number 21 on the chart for the week of October 25, 2008.

Chart (2008)	Peak position
Canada Country (Billboard)	33
US Bubbling Under Hot 100 (Billboard)	3
US Hot Country Songs (Billboard)	21
