= Best Days of Your Life =

Single by Kellie Pickler

from the album Kellie Pickler
- Released: December 1, 2008
- Recorded: 2008
- Genre: Country pop
- Length: 3:47
- Label: BNA
- Songwriters: Kellie Pickler; Taylor Swift
- Producer: Chris Lindsey

Kellie Pickler singles chronology
| "Don't You Know You're Beautiful" (2008) | "Best Days of Your Life" (2008) | "Didn't You Know How Much I Loved You" (2009) |

Music video
- "Best Days of Your Life" on YouTube

"Best Days of Your Life" is a song by American country music artist Kellie Pickler. She wrote the song with American singer-songwriter Taylor Swift who also provides background vocals on the song. It was released on December 1, 2008, as the second single from Kellie Pickler's second album Kellie Pickler. The song is about a narrator explaining how her former boyfriend cheated on her and moved on to a new girlfriend to start a family with, wishing them well on their new life but says that the new girl won't top what they previously once had before.

The song received negative reviews from critics who panned the lyricism and melody for being nondescript. Despite this, "Best Days of Your Life" peaked at number nine on the Billboard Hot Country Songs chart, Pickler's highest charting country single to date. It also charted at number 46 on the Hot 100. The song was certified Platinum by the Recording Industry Association of America (RIAA), and has sold 1,133,000 units in the United States as of June 2010. The song also charted in Canada, peaking at number 99 on the Canadian Hot 100.

The accompanying music video for the song, directed by Roman White, features Pickler's ex-boyfriend having a miserable life with his new girlfriend and misses being with Pickler instead. Pickler debuted the song with a performance on November 12, 2008 at the 2008 CMA Awards. She also performed the song on American Idol, The Ellen DeGeneres Show, and the 2009 CMT Music Awards.

== Composition and lyrics ==
"Best Days of Your Life" is an up-tempo country pop song mostly backed by electric guitar. Its narrator tells about a former boyfriend who cheated on her and is going to get married and build a family with the lover. Although she wishes them to be happy and have a nice life, she says that he's already had the best days of his life with her (the narrator), and the new partner can never top it. She also feels sorry for his new girlfriend, because she has the concept that a cheater will always be a cheater, and while she is getting the prizes of her future, all the lover gets is the cheater boyfriend.

In an interview, Pickler has said that the circumstances portrayed in the song are based on a real-life experience that she herself went through. Pickler stated that she discovered her boyfriend cheating while she was on Brad Paisley's Bonfires & Amplifiers Tour as an opening act alongside her friend and fellow country singer Taylor Swift. She told Swift about her boyfriend cheating and Swift had the idea of writing a song about the experience.

Pickler's former boyfriend Jordin Tootoo claimed in an interview with the Montreal Gazette and in his autobiography that Pickler's song was about their relationship.

== Critical reception ==
Kevin J. Coyne of Country Universe described the chorus as strong and compared it to the catchiness of Faith Hill's "This Kiss". But, he described the verses unfavorably: "Pickler sounds strained, there’s no discernible melody and the lyrics are no more memorable than the music backing them up." Jim Malec of The 9513 gave the song a thumbs down, saying that "[The song] isn’t funny, nor poignant, nor empowering. It is solely, and wholly, and unapologetically concerned only with expressing its fury. “Best Days of Your Life” is essentially four minutes of Pickler venting, unbridled and unartful."

== Chart performance ==
The song debuted at number 56 on the U.S. Billboard Hot Country Songs chart for the week of November 20, 2008. The song has become her biggest hit on the Billboard Hot 100, debuting at number 50 following the song's performance on American Idol. This song has been Pickler's most successful single to date and her first Top Ten hit on the country charts, as well as her first single to surpass 1,000,000 legal downloads, achieving platinum certification in June 2010. After spending nearly 40 weeks on the country chart, it reached a peak of number nine in August 2009.

== Music video ==
Pickler and Swift in the music video

The music video was shot on February 26, 2009, in Nashville, Tennessee, and is directed by Roman White. It was released on March 25, 2009, to members of Pickler's official fanclub, and then to CMT on March 28, 2009.

In the video, Pickler goes out to the movies at the Belcourt Theater with her friends for her birthday and sees her boyfriend cheating on her (played by Cortney Buczkowski), so she leaves. Later on, he is completely unhappy with his new life and has many flashbacks of him and Pickler. One day while he and his girlfriend are walking through Hillsboro Village, she reveals that she is pregnant; he runs across the street and tries to make it up to Pickler, who is out shopping with Taylor Swift, but he is hit by a bus and put in the hospital. Later, Pickler visits him and signs her name on his body cast and leaves. Throughout this, Pickler is shown singing alongside Swift and her band, with Pickler's ex watching through his television.

== Charts and certifications ==
=== Weekly charts ===
| Chart (2008–2009) | Peak position |
|---|---|
| Canada Hot 100 (Billboard) | 99 |
| Canada Country (Billboard) | 23 |
| US Billboard Hot 100 | 46 |
| US Hot Country Songs (Billboard) | 9 |

=== Year-end charts ===
| Chart (2009) | Position |
|---|---|
| US Country Songs (Billboard) | 37 |

=== Certifications ===
| Region | Certification | Certified units/sales |
|---|---|---|
| United States (RIAA) | Platinum | 1,133,000 |
