= Kellie Pickler (album) =

Studio album by Kellie Pickler
- Released: September 30, 2008
- Genres: Country; country pop
- Length: 35:21 / 46:41 (iTunes Deluxe Edition)
- Labels: BNA; 19
- Producer: Chris Lindsey

Kellie Pickler chronology
Small Town Girl (2006)	Kellie Pickler (2008)	100 Proof (2012)

Singles from Kellie Pickler
- 1. "Don't You Know You're Beautiful" Released: June 9, 2008; 2. "Best Days of Your Life" Released: December 1, 2008; 3. "Didn't You Know How Much I Loved You" Released: August 31, 2009; 4. "Makin' Me Fall in Love Again" Released: April 19, 2010

Kellie Pickler is the second studio album by American country music singer Kellie Pickler. The lead-off single, "Don't You Know You're Beautiful", was debuted at the 43rd Academy Of Country Music Awards and peaked at number 21 on Hot Country Songs. The album was released via BNA Records/19 Recordings on September 30, 2008. Since the albums' release, three more singles have charted; "Best Days of Your Life" at number 9 (which Pickler co-wrote with singer-songwriter Taylor Swift), "Didn't You Know How Much I Loved You" at number 14 (a re-recording of an album cut from Pickler's debut album Small Town Girl) and "Makin' Me Fall in Love Again" at number 30.

== Critical reception ==
Professional ratings
Review scores
Source	Rating
AllMusic	2/5 stars
Billboard	(favorable)
Charlotte Observer	3/4 stars
Country Weekly	3.5/5 stars
Jackson NJ Online	(favorable)
Robert Christgau	(choice cut)
USA Today	3/4 stars
Us Weekly	3/4 stars

Billboard contributor Ken Tucker gave praise to "Somebody to Love Me" and "One Last Time" for being "aching and sincere with production to match" and highlighted "Best Days of Your Life" as "one of the album's best cuts." He later called Pickler's record "another solid step toward country stardom." Chris Neal of Country Weekly also called it "a confident step forward that finds her developing as both vocalist and songwriter, especially with the clutch of alternately sad, angry and funny post-breakup songs that dominate the album." Robert Christgau cited "Rocks Instead of Rice" as a "choice cut", indicating a good song on "an album that isn't worth your time or money." AllMusic's Stephen Thomas Erlewine was critical of the record, saying it was devoid of the cornball charm and girl-next-door ennui that encapsulated Small Town Girl, and was replaced with overly produced country pop tracks that bring out Pickler's limitations as a vocalist.

== Track listing ==
All tracks are produced by Chris Lindsey.

No.	Title	Writer(s)	Length
1.	"Don't You Know You're Beautiful"	C. Lindsey; Aimee Mayo; Karyn Rochelle	3:16
2.	"I'm Your Woman"	Josh Kear; Troy Verges; Rochelle	2:56
3.	"Rocks Instead of Rice"	Kellie Pickler; Kear; Chris Tompkins	3:19
4.	"Didn't You Know How Much I Loved You"	C. Lindsey; Mayo; Verges	4:45
5.	"Lucky Girl"	Catherine Britt; Brett Beavers; Tony Martin	2:30
6.	"One Last Time"	Pickler; Kyle Jacobs; C. Lindsey; Mayo	3:36
7.	"Best Days of Your Life"	Pickler; Taylor Swift	3:47
8.	"Somebody to Love Me"	Pickler; C. Lindsey; Mayo	4:19
9.	"Makin' Me Fall in Love Again"	Rochelle; James T. Slater; Shane Stevens	3:26
10.	"Going Out in Style"	Pickler; Jacobs; Mayo; C. Lindsey	3:37

iTunes Deluxe Edition bonus tracks
No.	Title	Writer(s)	Length
11.	"Anything But Me"	Pickler; C. Lindsey; Rochelle	3:40
12.	"Don't Close Your Eyes"	Bob McDill	4:00
13.	"Happy"	Pickler; Jacobs; Kear; C. Lindsey; Mayo; Verges; Rochelle; Hillary Lindsey; Chris Tompkins	3:40

Deluxe Edition Bonus DVD
No.	Title	Length
1.	"A Day on the Road" (documentary)
2.	"Don't You Know You're Beautiful" (music video)

== Personnel ==
- David Angell – violin
- Tom Bukovac – electric guitar
- John Catchings – cello
- Lisa Cochran – background vocals
- Perry Coleman – background vocals
- J.T. Corenflos – electric guitar
- Eric Darken – percussion
- David Davidson – violin
- Dan Dugmore – pedal steel guitar
- Shannon Forrest – drums, percussion
- Paul Franklin – pedal steel guitar
- Tony Harrell – Hammond B-3 organ, piano, synthesizer
- Mark Hill – bass guitar
- Troy Lancaster – electric guitar
- Chris Lindsey – acoustic guitar, electric guitar, horn arrangements, synthesizer arrangements
- Gordon Mote – Hammond B-3 organ, piano, synthesizer
- Jimmy Nichols – Hammond B-3 organ, piano, synthesizer
- Kellie Pickler – lead vocals
- Karyn Rochelle – background vocals
- Pam Sixfin – violin
- Jimmie Lee Sloas – bass guitar
- Taylor Swift – background vocals on "Best Days of Your Life"
- Ilya Toshinsky – acoustic guitar
- Kris Wilkinson – viola, string arrangements
- Glenn Worf – bass guitar

== Promotion ==
To help promoting the album, Kellie Pickler was released in a regular edition (which only includes the CD) and a Deluxe Edition, including the normal CD, along with a special DVD with 30-minute footage from Pickler on her tour and behind the scenes of the recording process (called "A Day on the Road"), and the music video for "Don't You Know You're Beautiful".

The Deluxe Edition features three bonus tracks if bought on a digital retailer (such as iTunes); "Anything But Me", "Happy," and a cover of Keith Whitley's "Don't Close Your Eyes".

== Chart performance ==
The album debuted at number nine on the U.S. Billboard 200 chart, selling about 43,000 copies in its first week. The album has thus far spent 48 weeks on the Billboard 200 chart and has sold 440,000 copies as of December 22, 2010. It debuted at number one on the U.S. Top Country Albums chart, her second consecutive album to do so.

=== Weekly charts ===
Chart (2008)	Peak position
US Billboard 200	9
US Top Country Albums (Billboard)	1

=== Year-end charts ===
Chart (2008)	Position
US Top Country Albums (Billboard)	68
Chart (2009)	Position
US Billboard 200	152
US Top Country Albums (Billboard)	29
Chart (2010)	Position
US Top Country Albums (Billboard)	60

=== Singles ===
Year	Single	Peak chart positions			Certifications
Year	Single	US Country	US	CAN	Certifications
2008	"Don't You Know You're Beautiful"	21	103	—	
2008	"Best Days of Your Life"	9	46	99	US: Platinum
2009	"Didn't You Know How Much I Loved You"	14	97	—	
2010	"Makin' Me Fall in Love Again"	30	—	—	
"—" denotes releases that did not chart
