= Didn't You Know How Much I Loved You =

Single by Kellie Pickler

from the album Kellie Pickler
- Released: August 31, 2009
- Recorded: 2009
- Genre: Country
- Length: 3:24 (radio edit); 4:45 (album version)
- Label: BNA
- Songwriters: Chris Lindsey; Aimee Mayo; Troy Verges
- Producer: Chris Lindsey

Kellie Pickler singles chronology
"Best Days of Your Life" (2008)	"Didn't You Know How Much I Loved You" (2009)	"Makin' Me Fall in Love Again" (2010)

Music video
- "Didn't You Know How Much I Loved You" on YouTube

"Didn't You Know How Much I Loved You" is a song written by Chris Lindsey, Aimee Mayo and Troy Verges, and recorded by American country music artist Kellie Pickler. It was released in August 2009 as the third single from her self-titled second album, and her sixth single release overall. The song is a power ballad where a narrator describes her lost love, responding to him with said song title as a question.

The song garnered mixed reviews from critics who found the lyrics generic but praised the hook and Pickler's vocal performance of the lyrics. "Didn't You Know How Much I Loved You" peaked at number 14 on the Billboard Hot Country Songs chart and number 97 on the Hot 100. An accompanying music video for the song, directed by Roman White, was shot in the Dominican Republic.

== Content ==
"Didn't You Know How Much I Loved You" is a power ballad, backed primarily by piano and electric guitar. The female narrator describes the feeling of losing the one she loves, responding to him with the question: 'Didn't you know how much I loved you?'

The song was featured as a track on Pickler's debut album, Small Town Girl. It was later re-recorded and included on her self-titled second album, from which it was released as a single at Pickler's request: "I love 'Didn’t You Know How Much I Loved You!' I was gonna put it on every album until it was released as a single. I guess they figure this might finally shut me up."

== Critical reception ==
Jim Malec of The 9513 gave the song a thumbs-up rating. Although he described the verses as "disposable and generic", he thought that the song's hook compensated. "“Didn’t you know how much I loved you?” is a great hook. Great enough that we’re not going to remember how average the rest of the song is, only the tremendous power of those words." He also complimented her vocals: "Pickler hits the song’s melodic peak she’s soaring, squeezing out every bit of power and emotion her voice can muster." Roughstock reviewer Bobby Peacock also described the verses as "pedestrian" but added, "[w]ith a good enough vocal performance, even a trite lyric can be elevated greatly." His review also describes the title hook favorably. Kevin J. Coyne of Country Universe gave the song a C rating. "There’s such an incongruity between the softly sung verses and the bombastic chorus that it’s hard to get a handle on how she’s asking the titular question. Is she angry? Sad? Disappointed? Disbelieving? Take any twenty seconds of the song, and you might get a different answer."

== Music video ==
The music video, directed by Roman White, debuted on CMT on September 11, 2009. The video begins with Pickler sitting on a bed, before making her way outside to a balcony. She is then shown standing among ruins, and then walking along the beach. The video was shot in the Dominican Republic.

== Chart performance ==
"Didn't You Know How Much I Loved You" debuted at number 55 on the U.S. Billboard Hot Country Songs chart for the week of September 12, 2009. After 26 weeks on the chart, it peaked at number 14 for the week of February 27, 2010.

Chart (2009–2010)	Peak position
Canada Country (Billboard)	49
US Billboard Hot 100	97
US Hot Country Songs (Billboard)	14

== Covers ==
Skylar Laine performed the song on the eleventh season of American Idol during the Top 7 week.

== Sales ==
United States: 255,000
