= Small Town Girl (album) =

Studio album by Kellie Pickler
- Released: October 31, 2006
- Recorded: July–September 2006
- Genre: Country
- Length: 42:25
- Label: BNA; 19
- Producer: Blake Chancey

Kellie Pickler chronology
Small Town Girl (2006)	Kellie Pickler (2008)

Singles from Small Town Girl
- 1. "Red High Heels" Released: September 13, 2006; 2. "I Wonder" Released: March 5, 2007; 3. "Things That Never Cross a Man's Mind" Released: September 10, 2007

Professional ratings
Review scores
Source	Rating
About.com	4.5/5 stars
Allmusic	3/5 stars
Country Weekly	3.5/5 stars

Small Town Girl is the debut studio album by American country music singer Kellie Pickler, released on October 31, 2006, by BNA Records. The album was produced by Blake Chancey. The album was certified Gold by the RIAA on January 18, 2007.

The album produced three Top 20 singles: The RIAA certified "Red High Heels", "I Wonder", and "Things That Never Cross a Man's Mind" Gold. "Didn't You Know How Much I Loved You" was re-recorded for Kellie's self-titled second album, and released on August 31, 2009, as that albums' third single and a Top 20 hit for Pickler.

== Track listing ==
No.	Title	Writer(s)	Length
1.	"Red High Heels"	Kellie Pickler; Chris Lindsey; Aimee Mayo; Karyn Rochelle	3:43
2.	"Gotta Keep Moving"	Steve McEwan; Angela Lauer	3:31
3.	"Things That Never Cross a Man's Mind"	Tim Johnson; Don Poythress; Wynn Varble	3:11
4.	"Didn't You Know How Much I Loved You"	C. Lindsey; Mayo; Troy Verges	4:07
5.	"I Wonder"	Pickler; C. Lindsey; Mayo; Rochelle	3:57
6.	"Small Town Girl"	Pickler; C. Lindsey; Mayo	4:25
7.	"Wild Ponies"	C. Lindsey; Mayo; Rochelle	4:14
8.	"Girls Like Me"	C. Lindsey; Mayo; Marv Green; Hillary Lindsey	3:47
9.	"I'm on My Way"	Sally Barris; Ashley Monroe; Liz Rose	4:36
10.	"One of the Guys"	Pickler; C. Lindsey; Mayo; Rochelle	3:27
11.	"My Angel"	Pickler; C. Lindsey; Mayo	3:19

== Chart performance ==
Small Town Girl debuted inside the U.S. Billboard 200 top 10 at number nine. The album debuted at number one on the Billboard Top Country Albums chart, selling about 79,000 copies in its first week, the album has since sold over 884,000 copies as of May 2010. Pickler is the second American Idol alumnus to have a number-one album on the U.S. Country Album chart, the first being Idol winner Carrie Underwood.

== Charts ==
=== Weekly charts ===
Chart (2006)	Peak position
US Billboard 200	9
US Top Country Albums (Billboard)	1

=== Year-end charts ===
Chart (2006)	Position
US Top Country Albums (Billboard)	72
Chart (2007)	Position
US Billboard 200	95
US Top Country Albums (Billboard)	20
Chart (2008)	Position
US Top Country Albums (Billboard)	65

=== Singles ===
Year	Single	Peak chart positions		Certifications
Year	Single	US Country	US	Certifications
2006	"Red High Heels"	15	64	US: Gold
2007	"I Wonder"	14	75	
2007	"Things That Never Cross a Man's Mind"	16	96	

== Certifications ==
Region	Certification
United States (RIAA)	Gold
