= Someone Somewhere Tonight =

Single by Kellie Pickler

from the album The Woman I Am
- Released: May 14, 2013
- Genre: Country, Christian country
- Length: 4:08
- Label: Black River
- Songwriters: Davis Raines; Walt Wilkins
- Producers: Frank Liddell; Luke Wooten

Kellie Pickler singles chronology
"100 Proof" (2012)	"Someone Somewhere Tonight" (2013)	"Little Bit Gypsy" (2013)

Music video
- "Someone Somewhere Tonight" on YouTube

"Someone Somewhere Tonight" is a song co-written and recorded by Walt Wilkins for his 2005 album, Mustang Island. Since then it has been covered by several artists including Kenny Rogers for his 2006 album, Water & Bridges, Pam Tillis for her 2007 album, RhineStoned, and by Dutch artist Mark Blomsteel (who first recorded it in 2012, but later released it as single from his 2019 album, Burning Old Bridges). In 2013, the song was recorded by Kellie Pickler and was released as the first single from her fourth studio album, The Woman I Am. Pickler's version peaked at number 49 on the Billboard Country Airplay chart in 2013.

== Content ==
The song's lyrics contemplate what different things people in the world are experiencing at the same time, contrasting between good and bad scenarios (such as someone tasting their first kiss versus someone suffering with alcoholism). It is performed from the perspective of a narrator singing to their significant other, and requesting in the chorus that they just lie down together and be still.

Kellie Pickler told Country Weekly that she felt "[it] is such a special song and is honestly my favorite song that I've ever cut and released to country radio. It's so real and it's so true, and it means something and I think people need to hear it." Pickler also connected with the song because of her husband, saying that "for me, my greatest treasure is my best friend and my best friend is my husband. And every night I get to go home to a good man. I think for the people out there that have yet to discover their soul mate and that significant other, that hasn’t found that best friend yet, I want to give them hope that that is possible."

== Critical reception ==
The song received favorable reviews. Matt Bjorke of Roughstock awarded the song five stars out of five, favorably saying that "poetic lyrics are lovingly performed over a burning, emotive melody with Pickler showcasing why she's such an engaging vocalist, the kind of vocalist who was born to sing songs like "Someone Somewhere Tonight." Billy Dukes, writing for Taste of Country, gave the song four-and-a-half stars out of five. He praised the song's continuation of the sonic direction of 100 Proof and the lyrical structure, while also complimenting Pickler's connection with the song, saying that "her performance is just short of the magical tear-jerking performance one feels coming from the first note, but still amongst the best and most genuine of her career. It’s refreshing to hear her sing from a place of love as opposed to a place of pain as she did early in her career with ballads like 'I Wonder.' The calm that Jacobs helped her find is allowing for her best music yet." Rolling Stone gave the song three-and-a-half stars out of five, describing it as "a widescreen power ballad with the kind of lyrics – steeped in down-home philosophizin' [sic] – that can be gruesome in the wrong hands. But here the music is raw and burly, full of shuddering electric guitars, and her big, open-throated singing sells the emotion of every last word."

== Music video ==
The music video for "Someone Somewhere Tonight" was directed by Roman White and premiered on CMT on July 9, 2013. The video, which shows Pickler dancing a choreographed routine around an empty house with Derek Hough, was inspired by the singer's 2013 appearance on Dancing with the Stars: "It was really neat that we were able to incorporate my passion for singing with my new passion for dancing."

== Chart performance ==
"Someone Somewhere Tonight" debuted at number 57 on the U.S. Billboard Country Airplay chart for the week dated June 15, 2013, and reached a peak of number 49 on the chart in its eighth week.

Chart (2013)	Peak position
US Country Airplay (Billboard)	49
