= Jordin Tootoo =

Canadian ice hockey player (born 1983)

Jordin Tootoo ᔪᐊᑕᓐ ᑐᑐ
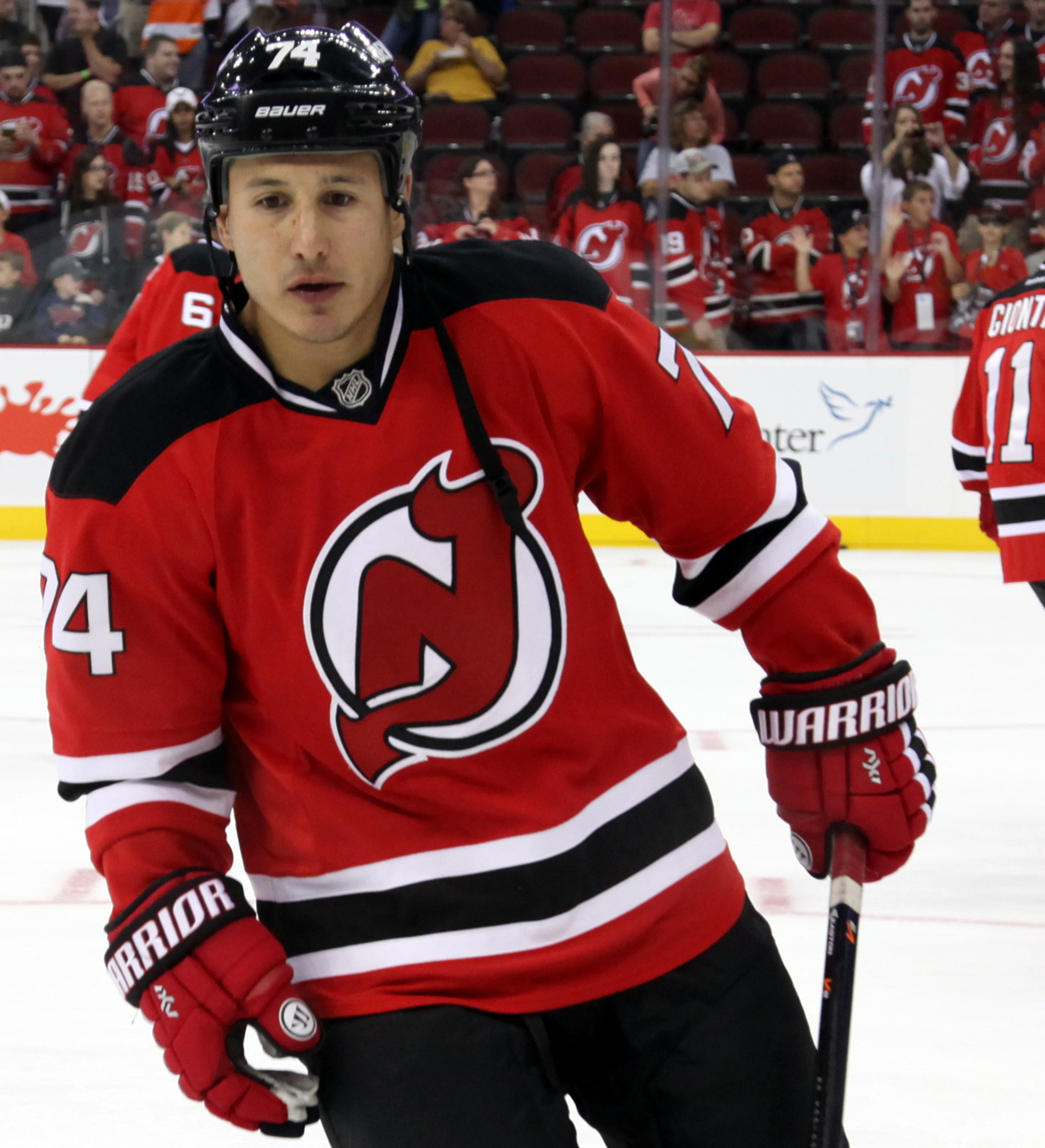
- Tootoo with the New Jersey Devils in 2014
- Born: February 2, 1983 (age 43) Churchill, Manitoba, Canada
- Height: 5 ft 9 in (175 cm)
- Weight: 199 lb (90 kg; 14 st 3 lb)
- Position: Right wing
- Shot: Right
- Played for: Nashville Predators; Detroit Red Wings; New Jersey Devils; Chicago Blackhawks
- NHL draft: 98th overall, 2001; Nashville Predators
- Playing career: 2003–2017

Jordin John Kudluk Tootoo MSM (Inuktitut: ᔪᐊᑕᓐ ᑐᑐ; born February 2, 1983) is a Canadian former professional hockey player, who played for the Nashville Predators, Detroit Red Wings, New Jersey Devils and Chicago Blackhawks. Of Inuit, Ukrainian and English descent, he is the first Inuk player to play in the National Hockey League (NHL). Tootoo was widely regarded as one of the NHL's best agitators and was able to annoy and fight other players to help his team win. At the end of the 2016–17 NHL season, Tootoo had accumulated 65 goals, 96 assists and 1010 PIMs in 723 career NHL games since entering the league in 2003.

In addition to his on-ice skills, Tootoo is known for his charity and community outreach work, especially in northern communities.

On October 19, 2018, he officially announced his retirement on Twitter, saying "After 220 regular-season games with the Wheat Kings and 723 games in the NHL I have decided to retire from the NHL to focus on giving back to the Indigenous community."

== Playing career ==
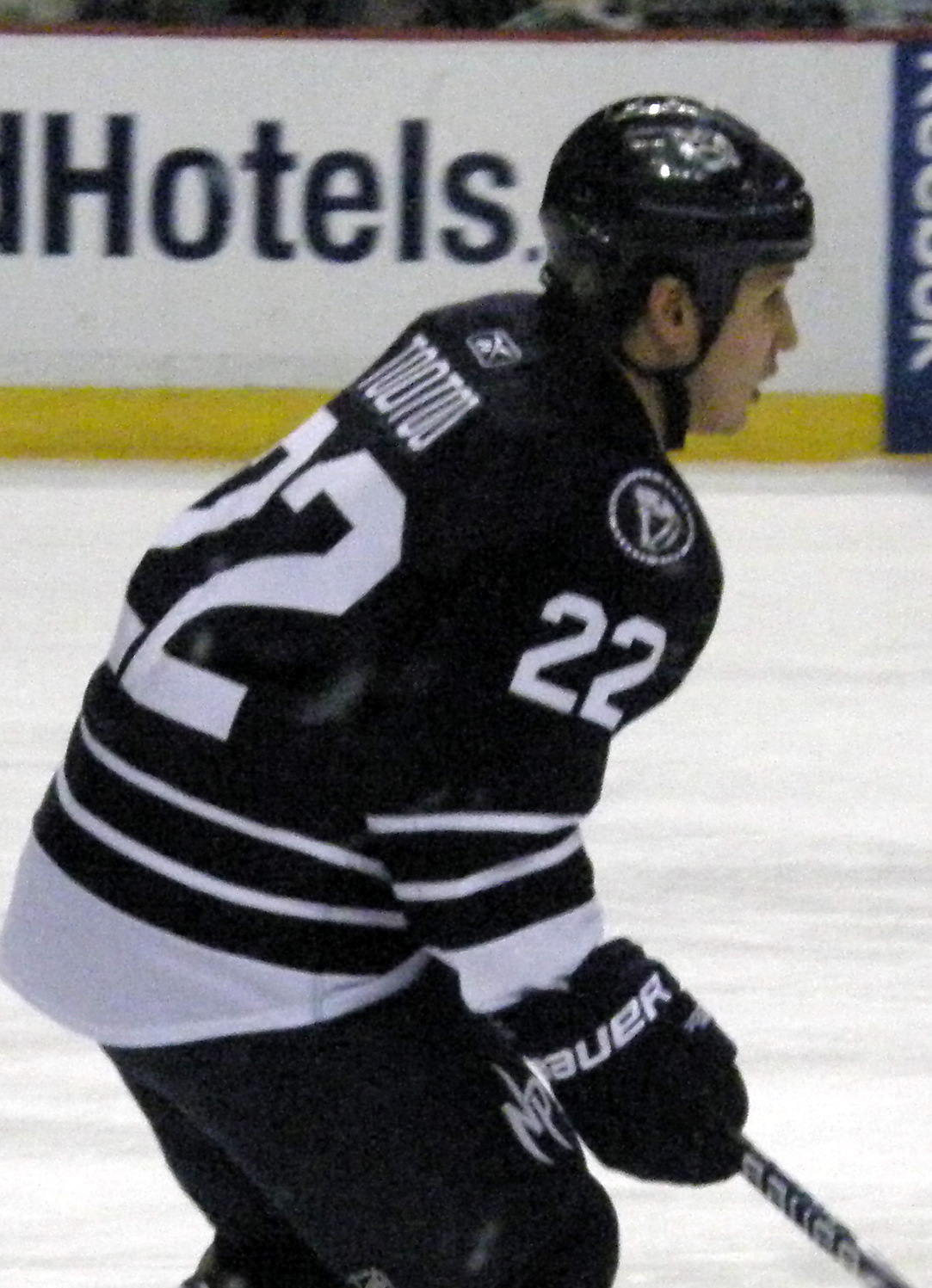
Tootoo in 2010 with Nashville

=== Nashville Predators ===
Tootoo was 13 years old when he moved from Rankin Inlet to go play Bantam AAA hockey in Spruce Grove, Alberta. The Brandon Wheat Kings selected him in the 3rd round of the 1998 WHL Bantam Draft. Tootoo played for the Wheat Kings in the Western Hockey League (WHL) from 1999 to 2003 and was selected 98th overall in the 2001 NHL entry draft as the sixth choice of the Nashville Predators. He became the first player of Inuit descent to play in a regular-season NHL game when he suited up against the Mighty Ducks of Anaheim on Opening Night October 9, 2003. He was also the first person of Inuit descent to be drafted by an NHL team. Tootoo wears the number '22' as a play on words of his name.

Tootoo got his first NHL point with an assist on a Dan Hamhuis goal against the St. Louis Blues on October 16, 2003 and scored his first NHL goal against the Atlanta Thrashers on October 23. Tootoo has also earned two "Gordie Howe hat tricks"—on January 10, 2004, and December 8, 2007—when he notched a goal, an assist, and a fighting major in each game.

He spent the 2005–06 season between the Nashville Predators and the Predators' minor league affiliate, the Milwaukee Admirals, where he played during the 2004–05 NHL lockout. On July 21, 2006, he was re-signed by the Predators to a two-year contract. On January 31, 2008, he was re-signed to another two-year contract extension.

Tootoo scored his first playoff goal on April 10, 2008, against the Detroit Red Wings in the second period of Game 1 of the 2008 Western Conference Quarter Finals in a 3–1 loss.

Tootoo currently holds the franchise record for total penalty minutes (725) with Nashville. Over his 486 games with the Predators, Tootoo recorded 46 goals and 79 assists for a combined total of 125 points during his eight years (2003—2012) with the Predators.

On February 2, 2019, the Nashville Predators held Jordin Tootoo Night at Bridgestone Arena, hosting the Dallas Stars. Tootoo spoke with the media and participated in the pregame puck drop.

=== Detroit Red Wings ===
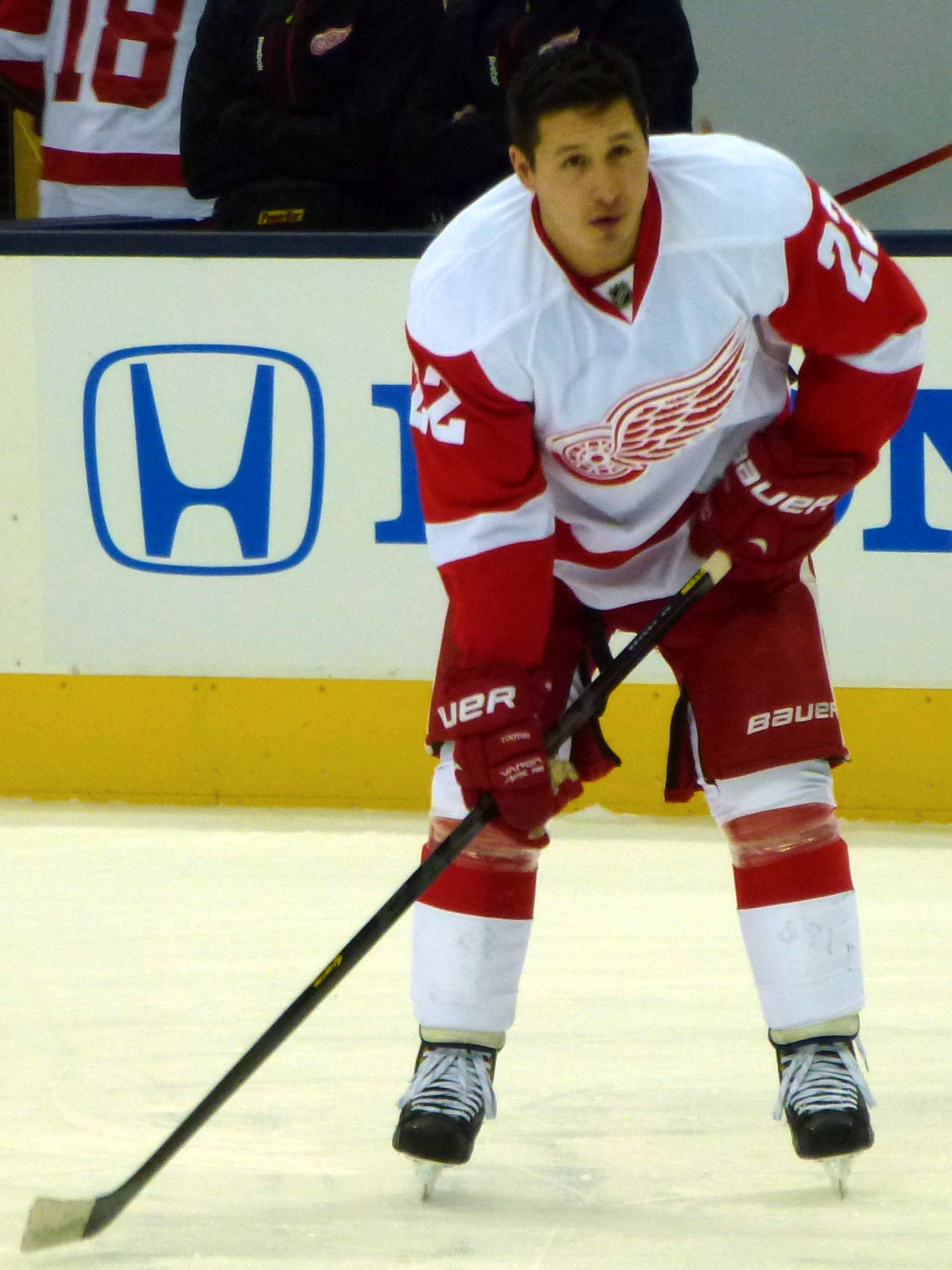
Tootoo warming up during the 2012–13 NHL season

Tootoo was designated an unrestricted free agent after the 2011–12 season. He signed a three-year, $5.7 million contract with the Detroit Red Wings, Nashville's Central Division rival on July 1, 2012. He scored his first goal as a Red Wing against his former team, the Predators on February 19, 2013.

On June 18, 2014, the Red Wings placed Tootoo on unconditional waivers for the purpose of a compliance buyout.

=== New Jersey Devils ===
Tootoo attended the training camp for the New Jersey Devils on a tryout basis and signed a one-year contract with the team on October 7, 2014. He played with the team for 68 games during the 2014–15 season. He scored 10 goals, had 5 assists, and sat for 72 PIM ranking 55th most penalty minutes in the NHL. On May 8, 2015, he was re-signed to a second one-year $825,000 contract.

=== Chicago Blackhawks and retirement ===
As a free agent on July 5, 2016, Tootoo left the Devils to sign a one-year contract with the Chicago Blackhawks. On February 28, 2017, Chicago agreed to extend Tootoo's contract through the 2017–2018 season. In his year with the Chicago Blackhawks, he was nursing an upper body injury and placed on long term injury reserve which resulted in him being waived in November 2017.

On October 19, 2018, Tootoo retired from hockey after playing 723 NHL games. Despite his retirement, Tootoo said he plans to "continue to work to enhance life for Native children who are suffering."

== Suspensions and disciplinary issues ==
Tootoo faced NHL disciplinary action on multiple occasions for his actions. On March 17, 2007, Tootoo punched defenceman Stéphane Robidas of the Dallas Stars in the face during a game. Robidas was knocked unconscious and suffered a concussion. Two days later the NHL issued Tootoo a five-game suspension without pay, and accusations of "dirty" play were leveled. These accusations were resurrected after an incident on October 11, 2007, in which Tootoo hit the head of Daniel Winnik of the Phoenix Coyotes with his shoulder.

On December 6, 2011, the NHL suspended Tootoo again, this time for two games, as a result of a charging incident against Buffalo Sabres' goaltender Ryan Miller in a game played on December 3, 2011. The incident occurred after Nashville's own GM, David Poile, publicly supported league action to prevent such hits on goaltenders.

Columbus Blue Jackets' forward Derek Dorsett accused Tootoo of throwing a sucker punch at him during a game on February 20, 2013.

== Personal life ==
Jordin Tootoo's older brother Terence played for the Roanoke Express of the ECHL in the 2001–02 season. Terence had a successful junior career with the OCN Blizzard, and was named the Express' Rookie of the Year. In August 2002, Terence died by suicide at the age of 22, in the wake of an arrest for drunk driving.

Tootoo's middle name, Kudluk, means "thunder" in Inuktitut. Jordin's mother Rose (née Harrison) is of English and Ukrainian descent, while his father Barney is an Inuk from Nunavut.

He is the paternal nephew of the former Manitoba Legislative Assembly Speaker George Hickes and cousin to former Nunavut Legislative Assembly Speaker and former federal minister Hunter Tootoo.

Although born in Manitoba, Tootoo grew up in Rankin Inlet, Nunavut, where he was taught to skate and play hockey by his father. Growing up in Rankin Inlet allowed Tootoo to learn the traditional Inuit lifestyle that includes hunting and camping, but also exposed him to mental and physical abuse. As the first Inuk to play in the National Hockey League he has become a role model for youth in Nunavut.

In 2007, Tootoo was in a relationship with former American Idol contestant and country music singer Kellie Pickler. Tootoo brought Pickler to his hometown of Rankin Inlet. The relationship ended that summer, due to Tootoo's infidelity. It is widely believed that Pickler's single "Best Days of Your Life" was written about Tootoo.

On December 27, 2010, Tootoo voluntarily entered the NHL/NHLPA's Substance Abuse and Behavioral Health Program to receive treatment for an alcohol problem. Following successful completion of the program, he returned to finish the season and play in the 2011 Stanley Cup playoffs.

In 2012 during the NHL hockey lockout Jordin Tootoo went to his home town of Rankin Inlet, Nunavut to host the first Team Tootoo hockey camp for the local kids. Tootoo's main focus of the camp was making sure the kids were having fun and being able to enjoy themselves as a community. "It’s going to be a really positive atmosphere. You’re going to learn hockey skills, but you’re also going to learn life skills and teamwork," he said.

In 2013 Stephen Brunt mentioned on radio that he was working on a book with Tootoo. The book was published on October 21, 2014, entitled All The Way: My Life on Ice.

== Team Tootoo Foundation ==
In 2015 the New Jersey Devils nominated Tootoo for the 2015 NHL Foundation Player Award. This award is designated to a player that exhibits valued characteristics to the NHL; commitment, perseverance and teamwork. The player that is selected is granted 25,000 dollars to a foundation of their choice, which ended up being the kickstart to his foundation. Tootoo's recognition comes from all the work his Team Tootoo Foundation has done in his hometown of Rankin Inlet, Nunavut and nationally. The inspiration that motivated Tootoo to start his foundation in 2011 was the suicide of his older brother Terence back in 2002. The main focus of The Team Tootoo Fund is to raise awareness for suicide prevention and anti-bullying programs for youths at risk. Having dealt with mental illness and suicide himself in the past he has been a positive voice for individuals struggling with these afflictions, often speaking out and sharing his story.

== International play ==
Medal record

Men's ice hockey

Representing Canada

World Junior Championships
Silver medal – second place	2003 Canada	

Tootoo represented Canada at the 2003 World Junior Championships, where he recorded two goals and one assist in six games, and won a silver medal.

== Career statistics ==
=== Regular season and playoffs ===
			Regular season					Playoffs
Season	Team	League	GP	G	A	Pts	PIM	GP	G	A	Pts	PIM
1997–98	Spruce Grove Broncos AAA	AMBHL	34	20	10	30	149	—	—	—	—	—
1998–99	OCN Blizzard	MJHL	47	16	21	37	251	—	—	—	—	—
1999–2000	Brandon Wheat Kings	WHL	45	6	10	16	214	—	—	—	—	—
2000–01	Brandon Wheat Kings	WHL	60	20	28	48	172	6	2	4	6	18
2001–02	Brandon Wheat Kings	WHL	64	32	39	71	272	16	4	3	7	58
2002–03	Brandon Wheat Kings	WHL	51	35	39	74	216	17	6	3	9	49
2003–04	Nashville Predators	NHL	70	4	4	8	137	5	0	0	0	4
2004–05	Milwaukee Admirals	AHL	59	10	12	22	266	6	0	0	0	41
2005–06	Nashville Predators	NHL	34	4	6	10	55	3	0	0	0	0
2005–06	Milwaukee Admirals	AHL	41	13	14	27	133	15	9	2	11	35
2006–07	Nashville Predators	NHL	65	3	6	9	116	4	0	1	1	21
2007–08	Nashville Predators	NHL	63	11	7	18	100	6	2	0	2	4
2008–09	Nashville Predators	NHL	72	4	12	16	124	—	—	—	—	—
2009–10	Nashville Predators	NHL	51	6	10	16	40	6	0	1	1	2
2010–11	Nashville Predators	NHL	54	8	10	18	61	12	1	5	6	28
2011–12	Nashville Predators	NHL	77	6	24	30	92	3	0	0	0	4
2012–13	Detroit Red Wings	NHL	42	3	5	8	78	1	0	0	0	2
2013–14	Grand Rapids Griffins	AHL	51	6	12	18	104	4	0	1	1	4
2013–14	Detroit Red Wings	NHL	11	0	1	1	5	—	—	—	—	—
2014–15	New Jersey Devils	NHL	68	10	5	15	72	—	—	—	—	—
2015–16	New Jersey Devils	NHL	66	4	5	9	102	—	—	—	—	—
2016–17	Chicago Blackhawks	NHL	50	2	1	3	28	2	0	0	0	0
NHL totals			723	65	96	161	1010	42	3	7	10	65

=== International ===
Year	Team	Event	GP	G	A	Pts	PIM
2003	Canada	WJC	6	2	1	3	4
Junior totals			6	2	1	3	4

== Awards ==
- Rookie of the Year, Most Popular Player, and Scholastic Player of the Year honours with the OCN Blizzard in 1998–99.
- Nominated as Manitoba's Sportsman of the Year for 2000.
- WHL Player of the Month for December, 2001.
- WHL Player of the Week for the week of December 23–30, 2001.
- Played in the 2001 CHL/NHL Top Prospects Game.
- Hardest shot in the 2001 Top Prospects Skills Evaluation (96.1 mph).
- WHL Player of the Week for the week of November 11–17, 2002.
- National Aboriginal Achievement Award, now the Indspire Awards, 2002 Youth Award.
- WHL East First All-Star Team, 2003
- Meritorious Service Medal (Canada), 2017

== See also ==
- Notable Aboriginal people of Canada
