= Laura Turner (singer) =

American singer

- Born: Houston, Texas, U.S.
- Genres: Christian, Gospel, Pop
- Occupations: Singer, songwriter
- Years active: 2003-present
- Labels: Curb, Independent

Laura Turner is an American singer born in Houston, Texas. She came to public notice following the release of her album Soul Deep on Curb Records in 2003.

== Career ==
Soul Deep appeared on the Upfront Club Top 40 in 2003, reaching a peak of 4 the week of August 30, 2003.

In 2010, Laura released two Christmas songs, "Mary, Sweet Mary" and "Come As You Are", produced by Keith Thomas.

== Artistry ==
Turner's vocal range is soprano. Turner trained as an opera singer. Her musical style has been described as unique and similar to that of Sarah Brightman, combining classical and pop elements.

== Discography ==
- Soul Deep (2003)
