= 100 Proof (song) =

Single by Kellie Pickler

from the album 100 Proof
- Released: January 24, 2012
- Genre: Country
- Length: 3:46
- Label: BNA
- Songwriters: Leslie Satcher; James T. Slater
- Producers: Frank Liddell; Luke Wooten

Kellie Pickler singles chronology
| "Tough" (2011) | "100 Proof" (2012) | "Someone Somewhere Tonight" (2013) |

"100 Proof" is a song recorded by American country artist Kellie Pickler. It was released on April 16, 2012, and served as the second and final single from the album of the same name. It was written by Leslie Satcher and James T. Slater, the same writers that wrote the album's first single "Tough". "100 Proof" uses an analogy between love and alcohol levels, as if its addictive. The song was Pickler's first to not reach the Top 40 on the Billboard Hot Country Songs chart, peaking at number 50 instead.

== Background ==
Written by James T. Slater and Leslie Satcher (who also wrote the first single, "Tough"), the title makes an analogy between love and level of alcohol, as if love is addictive. In its first verse Pickler describes a miserable relationship between her friends just to compare it, in the second verse, with her own; which is a very good one, fulfilled with passion and love. As the song continues, it narrates the awful things that the parts of the bad relationship talk to Pickler and the man she loves. However, when they get home, they still are surrounded by their love.

== Promotion ==
Prior to the official add date, the single was sent to secondary radio stations to gain momentum.

== Chart performance ==
"100 Proof" debuted at number 53 on the U.S. Billboard Hot Country Songs chart for the week dated May 12, 2012, and reached a peak of number 50 on the chart in its second week.

| Chart (2012) | Peak position |
|---|---|
| US Hot Country Songs (Billboard) | 50 |
