= Tough (Kellie Pickler song) =

Single by Kellie Pickler

from the album 100 Proof
- Released: June 13, 2011
- Genre: Country
- Length: 2:48
- Label: BNA
- Songwriter: Leslie Satcher
- Producers: Frank Liddell; Luke Wooten

Kellie Pickler singles chronology
"Makin' Me Fall in Love Again" (2010)	"Tough" (2011)	"100 Proof" (2012)

Music videos
- "Tough" on YouTube

"Tough" is a song written by Leslie Satcher and recorded by American country music artist Kellie Pickler. It was released on June 13, 2011, as the lead single to her third studio album, 100 Proof.

== Content ==
"Tough" is an up-tempo country song, featuring a neo-traditional production with fiddle, spoons, and steel guitar. The song's female narrator expresses that while she is just a regular girl ("I wanted lace / I wanted pearls / To be a princess like the other girls"), she was able to overcome challenges in her life by staying "tough" ("Tough / I ain’t never been nothing but tough / All my edges have always been rough").

In an interview with The Boot, Pickler raved about the song: "I've never been more excited about even just a single that we're releasing to radio. I think it's gonna be the best one that we've given radio. It's country. It's got a little bluegrass, it's got some fiddle, it's got some steel and it's got some spoons. It's got kind of a dirty hillbilly [sound], but it's still commercial enough, I think, for country radio."

== Critical reception ==
The song received generally positive reviews from country music critics. Billy Dukes of Taste of Country gave the song five stars, favorably referring to it as "a female anthem that over time even men won’t be able to resist cranking up on the radio." He also complimented the song's relatable lyrics and the new musical direction Pickler was going with. Matt Bjorke of Roughstock gave the song four-and-a-half stars out of five, favorably comparing it to the songs on the 'shakin' side of Laura Bell Bundy's Achin' and Shakin'. He complimented the song's production and Pickler's "bluesy, soulful delivery." Kevin John Coyne, reviewing the song for Country Universe, gave it a C rating, comparing it to Gretchen Wilson's "Redneck Woman."

== Music video ==
The music video, directed by Roman White, premiered on CMT on September 28, 2011. It shows a young Kellie Pickler playing with dolls on the living room floor when she witnesses her father being arrested. Later, the girl is shown in her teens visiting the prison where she has a conversation with her distraught father. Throughout the video, Pickler is shown performing the song while slinking down a hallway as well as walking down the street, and in the end Pickler herself embraces her father. The video is based on the real life relationship Pickler had with her father growing up.

== Chart performance ==
"Tough" debuted at number 59 on the U.S. Billboard Hot Country Songs chart for the week dated June 18, 2011, and later reached a peak of number 30 on the chart in August 2011.

Chart (2011)	Peak position
US Hot Country Songs (Billboard)	30
US Billboard Bubbling Under Hot 100	19
