= James T. Slater =

American songwriter

James Slater
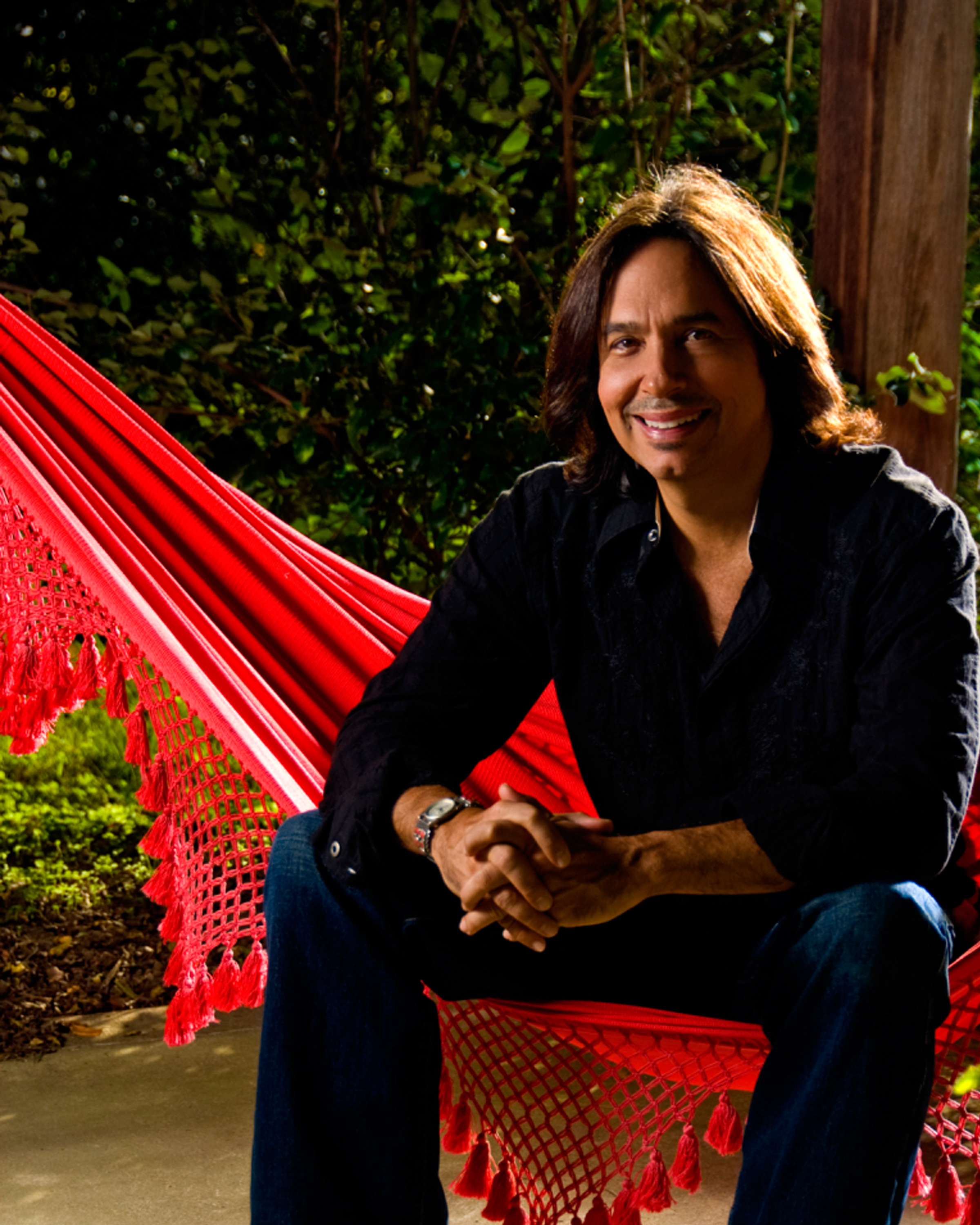

Background information
- Born: James Thomas Slater
- Origin: Durham, North Carolina, U.S.
- Genres: Pop, Country
- Occupations: Songwriter (lyric and melody)

James Thomas Slater is a two-time Grammy-nominated singer/songwriter based in Nashville. He has written several hit songs of American popular music.

== Background ==
James Thomas Slater was born in Durham, North Carolina. His father is a psychiatrist who plays the mandolin, and his mother is from Bolivia. He was raised in the Panama Canal Zone in Central America.

== Career ==
After high school, Slater attended and graduated from the University of Miami School of Music. After a brief move to Los Angeles, he moved again to Zurich, Switzerland where he lived for six years and enjoyed touring, recording, and writing music. During this time, he wrote "Don't Break My Heart," for Belgian super group Vaya Con Dios, signed a solo contract with BMG Switzerland, and penned the hit "Poco a Poco."

As of 2002, Slater lives in Nashville, Tennessee. Upon his arrival, he signed with Byron Gallimore's Song Garden/State One publishing company but made the move to EMI Music Publishing. During his time in Nashville, his songs have been recorded by country musicians including Tim McGraw, Kenny Chesney, Martina McBride, Rodney Atkins, John Michael Montgomery, Lorrie Morgan, Jessica Andrews, and Mark Wills, among others. McBride's recording of "In My Daughter's Eyes" has become a contemporary standard and garnered Slater a 2006 BMI country award as well as a BMI pop award. The song was also nominated for a Grammy for best vocal performance. Slater recently was nominated for the country song of the year Grammy for Jamey Johnson's "The High Cost of Living". He has also penned Rascal Flatts' single, "Unstoppable", which was used as a theme for the winter Olympics in Vancouver and has written American Idol Kellie Pickler's single, "Falling In Love Again".

Slater's song "Maggie Creek Road" is featured on Reba McEntire's 2009 album Keep On Loving You, which debuted at number 1 on the pop and country charts. Slater was featured in CMT's in Season 1 of "Gone Country" where he co-wrote the winning song "The Way That I Want You", (which was sung by Julio Iglesias Jr.).

In October 2016, Slater signed with BMG Music Publishing under industry veteran Chris Oglesby joining a roster including Hillary Lindsey, busbee, Tony Lane, and Travis Meadows. Most recently, Slater partnered with Tunecore and released Mexicoma, a selection of songs including the Tim McGraw cut "Mexicoma."

In 2022, Slater recorded an album of songs at Shrimp Boat Studios, Jimmy Buffett's personal recording studio, Shangri La in Key West, Florida.15 songs, on Grand Piano, including Guys Named Captain, recorded by Kenny Chesney, God Moves the Pen and That's Why God made Mexico, recorded by Tim McGraw, among others. The Album is titled Famous in Key West, Shrimp Boat Sessions.

Luke Combs released James' song "Joe" cowritten with Luke and Erik Dylan and performed it as well on the Grand Old Opry Stage...

Hailey Whitters also recorded and performed James' song "Casseroles" at the Grand Old Opry, co written by Hillary Lindsey and Tom Douglas.

Keith Urban released "God Whispered Your Name", written my Slater, Shy Carter, Chris August and Micah Carter, during Covid, the song became a top ten Country chart hit and a popular Wedding song.

== Discography ==
Slater co-wrote the following singles:

- Keith Urban: "God Whispered Your Name"
- Old Dominion: "I'll Roll"
- Jessica Andrews: "There's More to Me Than You"
- Gloriana: "Can't Shake You"
- Jamey Johnson: "High Cost Of Living"
- Chris Isaak: "Kiss Me Like A Stranger"
- Martina McBride: "In My Daughter's Eyes"
- Tim McGraw: "Lookin' for That Girl", "Mexicoma", "That's Why God Made Mexico", "Annie I Owe You A Dance", "Open Season On My Heart", "We Carry On""Damn sure Do"
- John Michael Montgomery: "Forever"
- Kellie Pickler: "Makin' Me Fall in Love Again", "100 Proof"
- Rascal Flatts: "Unstoppable", "Life's A Song"
- Chris Young: "I'm Going Your Way Jose"
- Lady Antebellum: "Get To Me"
- Carrie Underwood: "Forever Changed"
- Willie Nelson: "Solo Un Momento"
- Kenny Chesney : "The Life", "Guys Named Captain" "Wasted"
- Reba McEntire: "Maggie Creek Road", "The Clown"
- Emmylou Harris Rodney Crowell: "Open Season On My Heart"
- Enrique Iglesias: "Only A Woman"
- Luke Combs: "Joe"
- Sabrina Carpenter: “Christmas the Whole Year Round”
