= Things That Never Cross a Man's Mind =

Single by Kellie Pickler

from the album Small Town Girl
- Released: September 10, 2007
- Recorded: July–August 2006
- Genre: Country
- Length: 3:12
- Label: BNA
- Songwriter(s): Tim Johnson; Don Poythress; Wynn Varble
- Producer(s): Blake Chancey

Kellie Pickler singles chronology
"I Wonder" (2007)	"Things That Never Cross a Man's Mind" (2007)	"Don't You Know You're Beautiful" (2008)

"Things That Never Cross a Man's Mind" is a song written by Tim Johnson, Don Poythress and Wynn Varble, and recorded by American country music artist Kellie Pickler. It was released as the third and final single from her debut album, Small Town Girl on September 10, 2007.

== Content ==
"Things That Never Cross a Man's Mind" is an up-tempo song, featuring electric guitar and piano in the production. The song's female narrator playfully describes the differences between men and women by stating things that the average woman thinks of on a regular basis, "that never cross[es] a man's mind." Ironically, the song was written by three men.

== Critical reception ==
Billboard magazine described the song as "a frisky uptempo number that captures the playful side of Pickler's personality. Men will chuckle and women will nod in agreement. It's a clever lyric with a catchy melody, and Pickler's performance is absolute perfection. She has personality to spare, and this lighthearted single is tailor-made for country radio."

== Chart performance ==
The song debuted at number 59 on the U.S. Billboard Hot Country Songs chart for the week of September 10, 2007.

Chart (2007–2008)	Peak position
Canada Country (Billboard)	33
US Billboard Hot 100	96
US Hot Country Songs (Billboard)	16
