= I Wonder (Kellie Pickler song) =

Single by Kellie Pickler

from the album Small Town Girl
- Released: February 5, 2007
- Recorded: July–August 2006
- Genre: Country
- Length: 3:58
- Label: BNA
- Songwriters: Kellie Pickler; Chris Lindsey; Aimee Mayo; Karyn Rochelle
- Producer: Blake Chancey

Kellie Pickler singles chronology
"Red High Heels" (2006)	"I Wonder" (2007)	"Things That Never Cross a Man's Mind" (2007)

Music video
- "I Wonder" on YouTube

Alternative cover
- Back cover of the single.

"I Wonder" is a song written by Chris Lindsey, Aimee Mayo, Karyn Rochelle, and co-written and recorded by American country music artist Kellie Pickler. It was released as the second single from her debut album Small Town Girl (2006), on February 5, 2007.

"I Wonder" peaked at number 15 on the Billboard Hot Country Songs chart and number 75 on the Billboard Hot 100. The accompanying music video for the song was shot in the Ryman Auditorium in Nashville, where Picker performs the song. The video won three awards at the 2008 CMT Music Awards. Pickler, who co-wrote the song about her childhood, was notably emotional when performing the song live, especially at the 2007 CMA Awards, where her performance received a standing ovation.

== Content ==
"I Wonder" is a piano ballad with steel guitar fills, that describes the personal experiences of Pickler's childhood, in which her mother was absent.

In early 2007, after hearing one of Pickler's songs, her mother, Cynthia Morton, wrote her a letter. The letter arrived after "I Wonder" was written, and was not the inspiration for the song.

A short paragraph from Pickler describing the song's sentimental value to her was included on the back cover of the single.

== Critical reception ==
Billboard reviewed the song favorably. "In the lyric, Pickler reflects on missed moments (braiding hair, getting ready for prom) and wonders if her mother ever thinks about her. The most powerful music is that which draws from real life, and this is heartbreakingly honest and vulnerable. Yet among the hurt and confusion, Pickler emerges as a survivor. Country music at its finest from one of the format's most impressive new talents."

In 2008, "I Wonder" won three CMT Music Awards for Breakthrough Video of the Year, Tearjerker Video of the Year, and Performance of the Year (at the 2007 CMA Awards). Pickler also won a songwriter award for the song from the American Society of Composers, Authors, and Publishers.

== Live performances ==
Pickler singing "I Wonder" on The View.

On January 18, 2007, Pickler performed "I Wonder" for the first time on The View. At one point during the song, she briefly stopped and she could be seen trying to compose herself. Pickler's album subsequently climbed from number 83 to number 51 on the Billboard 200. Pickler performed "I Wonder" again on March 1, 2007 on American Idol. The week following the performance, her album jumped from number 100 to number 66 on the Billboard 200. Pickler performed the song at 2007 CMA Awards, where she received a standing ovation after she broke down crying at the end of the song. It won "Performance of the Year" in the 2008 CMT Music Awards.

== Music video ==
Pickler in a scene from the music video.

The music video for the song was shot on March 15, 2007 at the Ryman Auditorium in Nashville, Tennessee, and was released on March 31, 2007 on VH1. It starts off with Pickler getting off her tour bus and talking with fans as she enters at the famed showplace. After this, we see Pickler singing on a simple stage and, after, shows her walking to her dressing room, where she sees a little girl standing against the wall. She then walks out into the stage and sings. The song finishes and the video ends with Pickler seeing the little girl and smiling at her. Pickler's 2007 Country Music Awards performance of "I Wonder" was also used as a video by CMT.

== Chart performance ==
Chart (2007)	Peak position
US Billboard Hot 100	75
US Hot Country Songs (Billboard)	14

=== Year-end charts ===
Chart (2007)	Position
US Country Songs (Billboard)	55
