= Roman White =

American music video director

Roman White is an American music video and film director who has directed most of Carrie Underwood's videos. He has also directed music videos for Taylor Swift, Kelly Clarkson, Florida Georgia Line, Kelsea Ballerini, Cassadee Pope, Josh Groban, Easton Corbin, Thomas Rhett, Lauren Alaina, Lady A, Brett Young, Danielle Bradbery, Kellie Pickler, Carly Pearce, Hunter Hayes, Maddie & Tae, Maren Morris, Jennette McCurdy, Justin Bieber and more.

White directed his motion picture debut film Summer Forever, and the 2021 Netflix release A Week Away.

== Videos directed ==
115 music videos are currently listed here.

Year	Video	Artist
2003	"All Over Me"	The Benjamin Gate
2003	"Inside Out"	Nate Sallie
2003	"I Think You're Beautiful"	Amy Dalley
2004	"Live to the Music"	Verbs
2004	"Bring Me Down"	Pillar
2004	"Mr. Mom"	Lonestar
2004	"If Heaven"	Andy Griggs
2005	"Caroline"	Seventh Day Slumber
2005	"Good People"	Jeff Bates
2005	"One Love"	Hootie & the Blowfish
2005	"Jesus, Take the Wheel"	Carrie Underwood
2006	"Don't Forget to Remember Me"	Carrie Underwood
2006	"Last Day of My Life"	Phil Vassar
2006	"Favorite State of Mind"	Josh Gracin
2006	"Good, Good Lovin'"	Brian McComas
2006	"Before He Cheats"	Carrie Underwood
2006	"Welcome Home (You)"	Brian Littrell
2006	"Your Woman"	Little Texas
2006	"Don't Make Me"	Blake Shelton
2006	"'Fore She Was Mama"	Clay Walker
2007	"Wasted"	Carrie Underwood
2007	"Change"	Kimberley Locke
2007	"Missing Years"	Little Texas
2007	"Nothin' Like the Summer"	Carmen Rasmusen
2007	"Because of You"	Reba McEntire with Kelly Clarkson
2007	"The More I Drink"	Blake Shelton
2007	"As If"	Sara Evans
2007	"The One in the Middle"	Sarah Johns
2007	"Goes Down Easy"	Van Zant
2007	"So Small"	Carrie Underwood
2007	"Turpentine"	Brandi Carlile
2007	"Breathe In, Breathe Out"	Mat Kearney
2007	"Fall"	Clay Walker
2007	"Don't Waste Your Time"	Kelly Clarkson
2007	"Ever Ever After"	Carrie Underwood
2007	"Small Town Southern Man"	Alan Jackson
2008	"All-American Girl"	Carrie Underwood
2008	"If You Didn't Love Me"	Phil Stacey
2008	"This Town Needs a Bar"	Jeremy McComb
2008	"I'm About to Come Alive"	David Nail
2008	"Last Name"	Carrie Underwood
2008	"Beautiful Now"	Alex Woodard
2008	"Sounds So Good"	Ashton Shepherd
2008	"Love Remembers"	Craig Morgan
2008	"Every Other Weekend"	Reba McEntire
2008	"Just a Dream"	Carrie Underwood
2008	"Somebody Said a Prayer"	Billy Ray Cyrus
2008	"Everything Is Fine"	Josh Turner
2008	"What It Takes"	Adam Gregory
2009	"Best Days of Your Life"	Kellie Pickler (with Taylor Swift)
2009	"Together"	Ruben Studdard
2009	"You Belong with Me"	Taylor Swift
2009	"Skinny Dippin'"	Whitney Duncan
2009	"Red Light"	David Nail
2009	"All the Way Up"	Emily Osment
2009	"Mister Officer"	Jypsi
2009	"Didn't You Know How Much I Loved You"	Kellie Pickler
2009	"Midnight Romeo"	Push Play
2009	"One Less Lonely Girl"	Justin Bieber
2009	"Fifteen"	Taylor Swift
2009	"Dreams"	Brandi Carlile
2009	"Hillbilly Bone"	Blake Shelton with Trace Adkins
2010	"Like You Do"	Angel Taylor
2010	"It's Just That Way"	Alan Jackson
2010	"That Year" (with William Campbell)	Brandi Carlile
2010	"I Never Told You"	Colbie Caillat
2010	"Diary"	Tino Coury
2010	"Boys in the Summer"	Jessie James
2010	"Makin' Me Fall in Love Again"	Kellie Pickler
2010	"Not That Far Away"	Jennette McCurdy
2010	"Where We Belong"	Thriving Ivory
2010	"Mine"	Taylor Swift
2010	"Hello World"	Lady Antebellum
2010	"Hidden Away"	Josh Groban
2011	"When the Smoke Clears"	Due West
2011	"Country Song"	Seether
2011	"Generation Love"	Jennette McCurdy
2011	"Staying's Worse Than Leaving"	Sunny Sweeney
2011	"Teenage Daughters"	Martina McBride
2011	"Amen"	Edens Edge
2011	"I Want Somebody (Bitch About)"	Kristin Chenoweth
2011	"Let Me Go"	Christian Kane
2011	"I'm Gonna Love You Through It"	Martina McBride
2011	"Tough"	Kellie Pickler
2011	"Not Just You"	Cody Simpson
2011	"Mistletoe"	Justin Bieber
2011	"Let's Don't Call It a Night"	Casey James
2011	"The Trouble with Girls"	Scotty McCreery
2012	"Glass"	Thompson Square
2012	"Train Wreck"	Marlee Scott
2012	"Over"	Blake Shelton
2012	"Airborne Ranger Infantry"	Kristy Lee Cook
2013	"All Over the Road"	Easton Corbin
2013	"Beat This Summer"	Brad Paisley
2013	"Someone Somewhere Tonight"	Kellie Pickler
2013	"See You Tonight"	Scotty McCreery
2013	"Trippin' On Us"	Lindsay Ell
2014	"Later On"	The Swon Brothers
2014	"Feelin' It"	Scotty McCreery
2014	"Gravy"	The Stellas
2014	"I Did with You"	Lady Antebellum
2014	"Longer"	Terri Clark
2015	"It Feels Good"	Drake White
2015	"Ridiculous"	Haley Georgia
2015	"I Am Invincible"	Cassadee Pope
2015	"Southern Belle"	Scotty McCreery
2016	"There's A Girl"	Trent Harmon
2016	"Patchwork Heart"	Chandler Stephens
2017	"Simple Things"	Brooklyn and Bailey
2017	"Heart Break"	Lady Antebellum
2018	"Born to Love You"	LANCO
2019	"Closer to You" (feat. Mason Dixon)	Carly Pearce
2019	"Catch" by Seth Kupersmith	Brett Young
2019	"Getting Good" with TK McKamy	Lauren Alaina
2020	"Anything She Says" (featuring Seaforth)	Mitchell Tenpenny
2020	"Even the River Runs out of This Town"	Will Hoge
