= 100 Proof (album) =

Studio album by Kellie Pickler
- Released: January 24, 2012
- Studios: Ben Folds' Recording Studio, Nashville, TN
- Genre: Country
- Length: 34:44
- Labels: BNA, 19, XIX
- Producers: Frank Liddell; Luke Wooten

Kellie Pickler chronology
| Kellie Pickler (2008) | 100 Proof (2012) | The Woman I Am (2013) |

Singles from 100 Proof
- 1. "Tough" Released: June 13, 2011; 2. "100 Proof" Released: April 16, 2012

100 Proof is the third studio album by American country music artist Kellie Pickler. It was released on January 24, 2012. The album includes the single "Tough". The title track, was released exclusively on iTunes on December 20, 2011. The album sold 27,000 copies in the first week, and is the highest-charting album of Pickler's career on the Billboard 200 and the Digital Albums chart.

== Reception ==
=== Critical ===
Professional ratings
Aggregate scores
| Source | Rating |
|---|---|
| Metacritic | 80/100 |
Review scores
| Source | Rating |
| About.com | 4/5 stars |
| AllMusic | 4/5 stars |
| Country Universe | 4/5 stars |
| Entertainment Weekly | B+ |
| MSN Music (Expert Witness) | B+ |
| Roughstock | 5/5 stars |
| Slant Magazine | 3.5/5 stars |
| Taste of Country | 4/5 stars |

Upon its release, 100 Proof received generally positive reviews from most music critics. At Metacritic, which assigns a normalized rating out of 100 to reviews from mainstream critics, the album received an average score of 80, based on 6 reviews, which indicates "generally favorable reviews". Rolling Stone listed 100 Proof as one of the five best country albums of 2012, and called Pickler "an unlikely trad-country heroine. But 100 Proof may be the best traditionalist album of the year. Pickler wraps her big, lustrous voice around old-fashioned honky tonk, rollicking road stories and big ballads, all produced with a perfect balance of throwback twang and contemporary sheen."

Stephen Thomas Erlewine with AllMusic gave it a four star rating, calling it "potent and straight, [it] hits harder than anything she's done before. [...] 100 Proof is the album where Kellie Pickler stops being a TV star and turns into a genuine recording artist: it's an album that's not just good when graded on a curve, but good by any measure." Rating it three stars out of five, Country Weekly writer Jessica Nicholson said that "it's clear that the American Idol alum has matured". She also praised Pickler's performance on "Tough" and "Unlock That Honky Tonk", and thought that the production was more traditional-sounding than mainstream country. Taste of Country's Billy Dukes rated the album four stars, and affirmed that with respect to this album "she should (and is) proud of, but almost more exciting is how this underestimated singer will slink into the traditional country genre on the next album and the one after that, and the one after that", which this "Kellie Pickler 2.0 is an upgrade that will make her a viable star for years to come." At Entertainment Weekly, Ray Rahman graded the album a B+, and found that "Proof is her meatiest, most adventurous output yet." In addition, MSN Music's Robert Christgau graded it a B+, and prefaced that "American Idol haunts this artistic breakthrough, a sense that she'll always sing what she's told no matter how many composition credits she bags", which she got six, "but if making nice comes all too naturally, the ones about the daughter she doesn't have and the father she was stuck with say that love is something she's willing to tough out."

Jonathan Keefe with Slant Magazine gave a three and-a-half rating, calling it a very good album saying it "100 Proof isn't a great album, but it's certainly a very good one, and it boasts a strong traditionalist bent. Though the album lacks a cohesive through line or consistent depth of material that would make for something more accomplished and challenging, it's a deeply personal record that explores country music's conventions in a creative, respectful way and gives Pickler ample opportunity to prove her chops as an interpretive singer. Whether or not the album allows her to boost her commercial profile remains to be seen, but it proves that Pickler is capable of far more than she has previously let on". Giving it 5 stars, Dan MacIntosh with Roughstock was in high praise of the "traditional country" sound on the album saying "This may be her third release/try to get it right, but she succeeds with flying colors; if 100 Proof is any indication of her musical future, Kellie Pickler is now an artistic force to be reckoned with". About.com's Robert Silva rated the album a four star, and he said that the "bottom line" with respect to this album that he "never expected Pickler to produce this good of an album. With 100 Proof, she takes a step forward from a crowd of sound-alikes. If Pickler lacks the fire and clever songwriting of Miranda Lambert, she nevertheless rivals Lambert's most recent record for pure start-to-stop listening pleasure." At Country Universe, Ben Foster rated the album four stars, and praised that "there is much that 100 Proof gets right", which was done "by placing Pickler in the musical environment that suits her best, and giving her a strong batch of song material". Furthermore, Forster found that "100 Proof demonstrates that Pickler’s potential is significantly greater than her previous efforts suggested", and that truly "without a doubt, 100 Proof is Pickler’s strongest album to date".

=== Accolades ===
Best albums lists
| Publication | Rank | List |
|---|---|---|
| Taste of Country | 64 | 100 Best Albums of 2000s |

== Track listing ==
| No. | Title | Writer(s) | Length |
|---|---|---|---|
| 1. | "Where's Tammy Wynette" | Jimmy Ritchey, Don Poythress, Leslie Satcher | 2:42 |
| 2. | "Unlock That Honky Tonk" | Kellie Pickler, Satcher | 3:38 |
| 3. | "Stop Cheatin' on Me" | Morgane Hayes, Liz Rose, Chris Stapleton | 2:48 |
| 4. | "Long as I Never See You Again" | Pickler, Dean Dillon, Dale Dodson | 3:44 |
| 5. | "Tough" | Satcher | 2:49 |
| 6. | "Turn On the Radio and Dance" | Pickler, Satcher | 3:13 |
| 7. | "Mother's Day" | Pickler, Kyle Jacobs | 3:41 |
| 8. | "Rockaway (The Rockin' Chair Song)" | Pickler, Barry Dean, Brent Cobb | 3:04 |
| 9. | "Little House On the Highway" | Rodney Clawson, Natalie Hemby | 3:13 |
| 10. | "100 Proof" | James T. Slater, Satcher | 3:46 |
| 11. | "The Letter (To Daddy)" | Dodson, Dillon, Pickler | 2:06 |

iTunes bonus track
| No. | Title | Writer(s) | Length |
|---|---|---|---|
| 12. | "Arm Candy" | Pickler, Hemby | 4:25 |

== Personnel ==
- Richard Bennett - acoustic guitar
- Chad Cromwell - drums, percussion
- Eric Darken - percussion
- Glen Duncan - fiddle, acoustic guitar, mandolin
- Paul Franklin - steel guitar
- Morgane Hayes - background vocals
- Wes Hightower - background vocals
- Jay Joyce - keyboards
- Rob McNelley - electric guitar
- Gordon Mote - piano
- Kellie Pickler - lead vocals
- Randy Scruggs - acoustic guitar
- Chris Stapleton - background vocals
- Jimmy Stewart - background vocals
- Ilya Toshinsky - banjo, acoustic guitar, electric guitar, resonator guitar, mandolin
- Luke Wooten - electric guitar
- Glenn Worf - bass guitar

== Chart performance ==
=== Weekly charts ===
| Chart (2012) | Peak position |
|---|---|
| US Billboard 200 | 7 |
| US Top Country Albums (Billboard) | 2 |

=== Year-end charts ===
| Chart (2012) | Position |
|---|---|
| US Top Country Albums (Billboard) | 57 |

=== Singles ===
| Year | Single | Peak chart positions | |
| Year | Single | US Country | US |
|---|---|---|---|
| 2011 | "Tough"^{A} | 30 | 119 |
| 2012 | "100 Proof" | 50 | — |
"—" denotes releases that did not chart

- ^{A}Did not enter the Hot 100 but charted on Bubbling Under Hot 100 Singles.
