= The Woman I Am (Kellie Pickler album) =

Studio album by Kellie Pickler
- Released: November 11, 2013
- Recorded: 2013
- Genres: Country, Christian country
- Length: 41:19
- Label: Black River Entertainment
- Producers: Frank Liddell; Luke Wooten

Kellie Pickler chronology
100 Proof (2012)	The Woman I Am (2013)

Alternative cover
- Vinyl Cover

Singles from The Woman I Am
- 1. "Someone Somewhere Tonight" Released: May 14, 2013; 2. "Little Bit Gypsy" Released: August 20, 2013; 3. "Closer to Nowhere" Released: March 3, 2014

The Woman I Am is the fourth studio album by American country music artist Kellie Pickler. It was released on November 11, 2013, through Black River Entertainment. The album includes the singles "Someone Somewhere Tonight", "Little Bit Gypsy", and "Closer to Nowhere."

== Content ==
The Woman I Am was produced by Frank Liddell and Luke Wooten, the same team who produced Pickler's third album, 100 Proof. Pickler co-wrote three of the album's twelve tracks, two of which she co-wrote with the help of husband and songwriter Kyle Jacobs.

"Someone Somewhere Tonight," a song previously recorded by both Kenny Rogers and Pam Tillis, was released as the album's lead single on May 14, 2013. After eight weeks, it reached a peak of number 49 on the Billboard Country Airplay chart in July 2013. "Little Bit Gypsy" and "Closer to Nowhere" were released as the album's second and third singles, peaking at number 50 and number 59, respectively.

== Critical reception ==
Professional ratings
Aggregate scores
Source	Rating
Metacritic	82/100
Review scores
Source	Rating
AllMusic	3.5/5 stars
Country Weekly	A
Engine 145	3.5/5 stars
Entertainment Weekly	B+
Got Country Online	5/5 stars
Music Is My Oxygen	4/5 stars
Newsday	B+
Rolling Stone	3.5/5 stars
Roughstock	4.5/5 stars
USA Today	3/4 stars

The Woman I Am garnered critical acclaim from music critics. At Metacritic, they assign a "weighted average" score to ratings and reviews from mainstream critics, which based upon four reviews the album has a Metascore of an 82, and this signifies "universal acclaim". At USA Today, Brian Mansfield felt that Pickler's "albums are as much fun as hearing her talk." Stephen Thomas Erlewine at AllMusic claimed that this album was not one "that makes a career, but rather one that helps a career be built." At Rolling Stone, Rob Tannenbaum alluded to how Pickler "continues to [write] vibrant drama from her crazy family". Glenn Gamboa for Newday highlighted that "With 'The Woman I Am,' Pickler shows how the next phase of her career may be bigger than she ever dreamed." At Entertainment Weekly, they said Pickler "ditches modish pop-country for old school songs about cheating and her pistol-packin' great grandma", and felt that "she shines brightest on the autobiographical title track." At Music Is My Oxygen, Rob Burkhardt noted that her underrated status was "poised to change" because the album will put "her in a position to come into her own." Furthermore, Burkhardt told that the release comes "with the perfect combination of old and new, spunk and honesty."

At Country Weekly, Tammy Ragusa evoked that "Kellie has made a natural evolution while managing to stay true to those things that are important to her" on the release. Also, Ragusa claimed that "with her commitment to the integrity of her music and sound, she’s definitely a female force to be reckoned with." Blake Boldt of Engine 145 noted how with this release Pickler "affirms her status as an authentic personality and, more importantly, an intelligent picker of songs." In addition, Boldt wrote that for the duration of the album Kellie "proves how a current hitmaker can emphasize the genre’s traditions while still engaging with contemporary sounds and themes", which this allow her "to resurrect the past and move it into the future." At Roughstock, Matt Bjorke proclaimed that "Kellie's 12 tracks on The Woman I Am are some of the best music she's made." Donna Block at Got Country Online proclaimed that "There are even more Kellie-country gems on the album", which is why "Country music fans will agree, we are all thankful Kellie has found her sound, herself, and shares it with all of us."

== Track listing ==
No.	Title	Writer(s)	Length
1.	"Little Bit Gypsy"	Kyle Jacobs; Tammi Kidd Hutton; Fred Wilhelm	3:06
2.	"Ring for Sale"	Jim Beavers; Chris Stapleton	3:24
3.	"Buzzin'"	Steve Moakler; TJ Osborne; John Osborne	3:28
4.	"The Woman I Am"	Kellie Pickler; Jacobs	3:02
5.	"Closer to Nowhere"	Carson Chamberlain; Wade Kirby; Phil O'Donnell	3:24
6.	"Selma Drye"	Pickler; Phillip Lammonds; Billy Montana	3:49
7.	"I Forgive You"	Hillary Lindsey; Aimee Mayo; busbee	3:32
8.	"Bonnie and Clyde"	Pickler; Jacobs; Liz Rose	3:10
9.	"Where Did Your Love Go"	Kalisa Ewing; Rivers Rutherford	3:51
10.	"No Cure for Crazy"	Jacobs; Joe Leathers; Montana; John Ozier	2:56
11.	"Tough All Over"	Gary Nicholson; Leslie Satcher	3:29
12.	"Someone Somewhere Tonight"	Davis Raines; Walt Wilkins	4:08
Total length:			41:19

== Personnel ==
Vocals

- Jessi Alexander – background vocals
- Kalisa Ewing – background vocals
- Kellie Pickler – lead vocals
- Jon Randall – background vocals

- Rivers Rutherford – background vocals
- Chris Stapleton – background vocals
- Russell Terrell – background vocals
- Luke Wooten – background vocals

Musicians

- Jimmy Carter – bass guitar
- J. T. Corenflos – electric guitar
- Justin Davis – electric guitar
- Fred Eltringham – drums, percussion
- Aubrey Haynie – fiddle
- Kyle Jacobs – acoustic guitar
- Rob McNelley – electric guitar
- Greg Morrow – drums

- Mike Rojas – piano
- Randy Scruggs – acoustic guitar
- Bryan Sutton – acoustic guitars
- Guthrie Trapp – electric guitar
- Luke Wooten – electric guitar, percussion
- Glenn Worf – bass guitar
- Sarah Zimmermann – acoustic guitar

Production

- Robert Chavers – art direction, package design
- Richard Dodd – mastering
- Debbie Dover – hair/makeup
- Brittany Hamlin – production assistant
- Renee Layher – wardrobe
- Frank Liddel – producer

- Kam Lutcherhand – assistant engineer
- Kyle Manner – assistant engineer
- Katie McCartney – art direction
- Charlie Paakkari – assistant engineer
- David Schwepkolt – assistant engineer
- Luke Wooten – engineer, mixing, producer

== Chart performance ==
The album debuted at No. 19 in the Billboard 200, and No. 4 in the Top Country Albums chart, with sales of 16,000.

=== Album ===
Chart (2013)	Peak position
US Billboard 200	19
US Top Country Albums (Billboard)	4
US Independent Albums (Billboard)	1

=== Singles ===
Year	Single	Peak chart positions	
Year	Single	US Country	US Country Airplay
2013	"Someone Somewhere Tonight"	—	49
2013	"Little Bit Gypsy"	49	50
2014	"Closer to Nowhere"	—	59
"—" denotes releases that did not chart
