= Little Bit Gypsy =

Single by Kellie Pickler

from the album The Woman I Am
- Released: August 20, 2013
- Genre: Country
- Length: 3:09
- Label: Black River
- Songwriters: Kyle Jacobs; Tammi Lynn Kidd; Fred Wilhelm
- Producers: Frank Liddell; Luke Wooten

Kellie Pickler singles chronology
"Someone Somewhere Tonight" (2013)	"Little Bit Gypsy" (2013)	"Closer to Nowhere" (2014)

"Little Bit Gypsy" is a song written by Kyle Jacobs, Tammi Lynn Kidd, and Fred Wilhelm, and recorded by American country music singer Kellie Pickler. It is her second single release for Black River Entertainment, and the second from her fourth studio album, The Woman I Am.

== Critical reception ==
Giving it an "A", Tammy Ragusa of Country Weekly wrote that it was "truly interesting and incredibly good. Kellie maintains her classic country sensibilities and vocals and pairs them with a contemporary tune that doesn't push into the pop-country world." Karlie Justus Marlowe of Engine 145 was less favorable, giving the single a "thumbs down". She called it "an entirely forgettable song" and "less a story and more of a character sketch", but praised the production, Pickler's vocals, and the "catchy chorus".

== Chart performance ==
"Little Bit Gypsy" debuted at number 59 on the Country Airplay chart dated for the week ending September 21, 2013. It also debuted at number 49 on the U.S. Billboard Hot Country Songs chart dated for the week of November 30, 2013.

Chart (2013)	Peak position
US Country Airplay (Billboard)	50
US Hot Country Songs (Billboard)	49
