= Red High Heels =

Single by Kellie Pickler

from the album Small Town Girl
- Released: September 13, 2006
- Recorded: July–August 2006
- Genre: Country
- Length: 3:42
- Label: BNA
- Songwriter(s): Kellie Pickler; Chris Lindsey; Aimee Mayo; Karyn Rochelle
- Producer(s): Blake Chancey

Kellie Pickler singles chronology
"Red High Heels" (2006)	"I Wonder" (2007)

Music video
- "Red High Heels" on YouTube

"Red High Heels" is a song written by Chris Lindsey, Aimee Mayo, Karyn Rochelle, and co-written and recorded by American country music artist Kellie Pickler. The song was the debut single off her debut album Small Town Girl (2006).

"Red High Heels" peaked at number 15 on the Billboard Hot Country Songs chart and number 64 on the Billboard Hot 100. The accompanying music video for the song, directed by Chris Hicky, features Pickler putting down her ex-boyfriend while celebrating with her girlfriends at a nightclub in said high heels. The song became her first to be certified Gold by the RIAA on June 2, 2009.

== Content ==
"Red High Heels" is an up-tempo country song, backed primarily by electric guitar. The song's female narrator, a young woman who is frustrated by a troubled past with a former ex, tells him that she'll move on in her "red high heels".

The song's title is predicated on Pickler's love for collecting shoes, and has become her signature song.

== Music video ==
Kellie Pickler in the music video.

A music video, directed by Chris Hicky, was released in October 26, 2006; it features Pickler wearing black tank top, and red top, denim jeans and red high heels. In the video, Pickler is shown approaching her ex-boyfriend as he is playing football. He starts to follow her but she pushes him away. She gets in her car with her girlfriends and drives to a nightclub, where she is shown performing on stage, with her band, as live entertainment. Her ex attempts to follow her to the club, but he is stopped at the door by the bouncer.

Portions of the video were shot at Robinson Stadium, and the high school football field in Watertown, Tennessee. The band performance was filmed at the Exit/In, a Nashville club.

== Chart performance ==
"Red High Heels" debuted at number 48 on the U.S. Billboard Hot Country Songs chart in September 2006, and peaked at number 15 in February 2007.

Chart (2006–2007)	Peak position
Canada Country (Billboard)	31
US Billboard Hot 100	64
US Hot Country Songs (Billboard)	15
US Billboard Pop 100	69

== Certifications ==
Region	Certification	Certified units/sales
United States (RIAA)	Gold	500,000^{*}
^{*} Sales figures based on certification alone.
