= Kellie Pickler =

American country singer (born 1986)

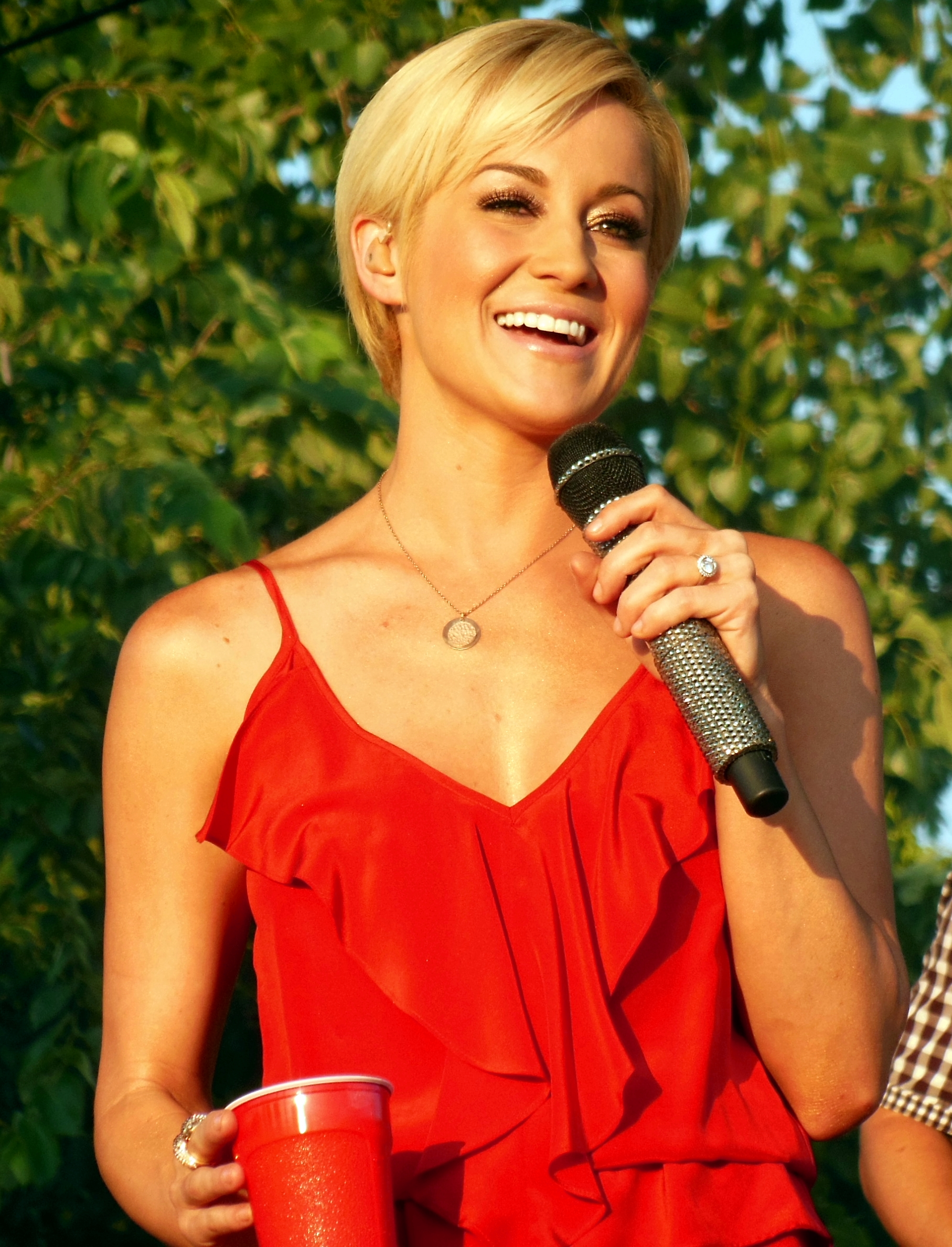
- Pickler performing in 2013

Background information
- Born: Kellie Dawn Pickler; June 28, 1986 (age 40); Albemarle, North Carolina, U.S.
- Genres: Country; country pop
- Occupations: Singer; actress; television personality
- Years active: 2005–2019, 2022–present
- Labels: BNA; 19 Recordings; Columbia Nashville; Black River Entertainment
- Spouse: Kyle Jacobs (m. 2011; died 2023)
- Website: kelliepickler.com

Kellie Dawn Pickler (born June 28, 1986) is an American country music singer, actress and television personality. Pickler gained fame as a contestant on the fifth season of American Idol and finished in sixth place. In 2006, she signed to 19 Recordings and BNA Records as a recording artist. Her debut album, Small Town Girl, was released later that year and has sold over 900,000 copies. The album, which was certified gold by the RIAA, produced three singles on the Billboard Hot Country Songs charts: "Red High Heels" at No. 15, "I Wonder" at No. 14, and "Things That Never Cross a Man's Mind" at No. 16.

Pickler released her self-titled second album in 2008 that produced four singles: "Don't You Know You're Beautiful" at No. 21, "Best Days of Your Life" at No. 9 (which she co-wrote with Taylor Swift), "Didn't You Know How Much I Loved You" at No. 14, and "Makin' Me Fall in Love Again" at No. 30. Following the closure of BNA Records, she moved to Black River Entertainment.

On May 21, 2013, Pickler and her partner, Derek Hough, won the sixteenth season of Dancing with the Stars. In 2016, she was inducted into the North Carolina Music Hall of Fame.

From 2017 to 2019, she co-hosted the nationally syndicated daytime TV talk show Pickler & Ben with comedian Ben Aaron. Pickler was married to Nashville songwriter and record producer Kyle Jacobs from 2011 until his suicide in 2023.

== Early life ==
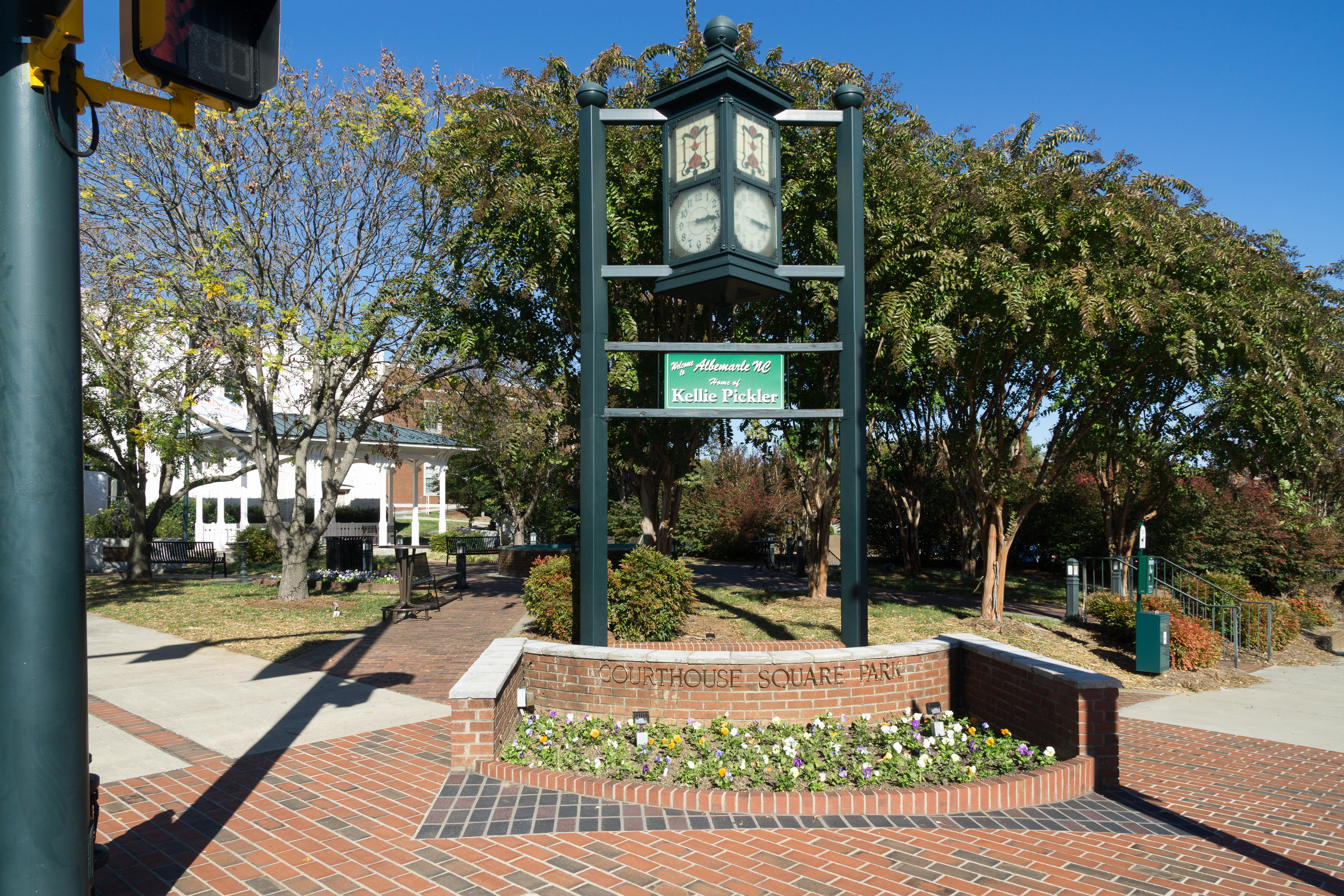
A banner proclaims Albemarle as "Home of Kellie Pickler"

Kellie Pickler was born June 28, 1986, at Stanly Memorial Hospital in Albemarle, North Carolina, to Cynthia Morton and Clyde "Bo" Raymond Pickler Jr. Her mother left when Kellie was two years old, then returned and took custody of her for two years. Eventually, the court returned Kellie to her grandparents when she was 12 and they raised her to adulthood because her father was absent from her life. Pickler says the major influences in her life are her grandfather, Clyde Raymond Pickler Sr., a former electrician, and grandmother, Faye Pickler. Pickler graduated in 2004 from North Stanly High School in New London, North Carolina, where she was a cheerleader. She sang "On the Side of Angels" by LeAnn Rimes at her high school graduation.

== American Idol ==
The 19-year-old Pickler auditioned for American Idol in the fall of 2005 in Greensboro, North Carolina. She sang both Kelly Clarkson's "Since U Been Gone" and Martina McBride's "A Broken Wing". The judges sent her to Hollywood. Pickler advanced through the semi-final rounds in February. On March 9, she reached the Top 12.

Pickler was among judge Simon Cowell's favorites. He once predicted Pickler would be in the final three, and said he preferred her over the previous season's winner, Carrie Underwood. Recognized for her "quirky" personality and Southern charm, Pickler gained attention on the show by saying that she had hardly ever performed before real audiences, and by mispronouncing words. She was compared to Jessica Simpson in a March 27-story in Us Weekly magazine titled "Kellie: The Next Jessica Simpson", due to her "sweet Southern style and ditzy demeanor". Pickler has stated in the past a previous ignorance of common popular culture before her Idol fame.

=== Performances and results (during voting weeks) ===
Kellie Pickler performances on American Idol
Week #	Theme	Song choice	Original artist	Result
Top 24 (12 Women)	N/A	"How Far"	Martina McBride	Safe
Top 20 (10 Women)	N/A	"Something to Talk About"	Bonnie Raitt	Safe
Top 16 (8 Women)	N/A	"I'm the Only One"	Melissa Etheridge	Safe
Top 12	Stevie Wonder	"Blame It on the Sun"	Stevie Wonder	Safe
Top 11	The 1950s	"Walkin' After Midnight"	Patsy Cline	Safe
Top 10	Songs from The 21st Century	"Suds in the Bucket"	Sara Evans	Safe
Top 9	Country	"Fancy"	Bobbie Gentry	Safe
Top 8	Queen	"Bohemian Rhapsody"	Queen	Safe
Top 7	Great American Songbook	"Bewitched, Bothered and Bewildered"	Vivienne Segal	Safe
Top 6	Love songs	"Unchained Melody"	Todd Duncan	Eliminated

== Post-Idol career ==
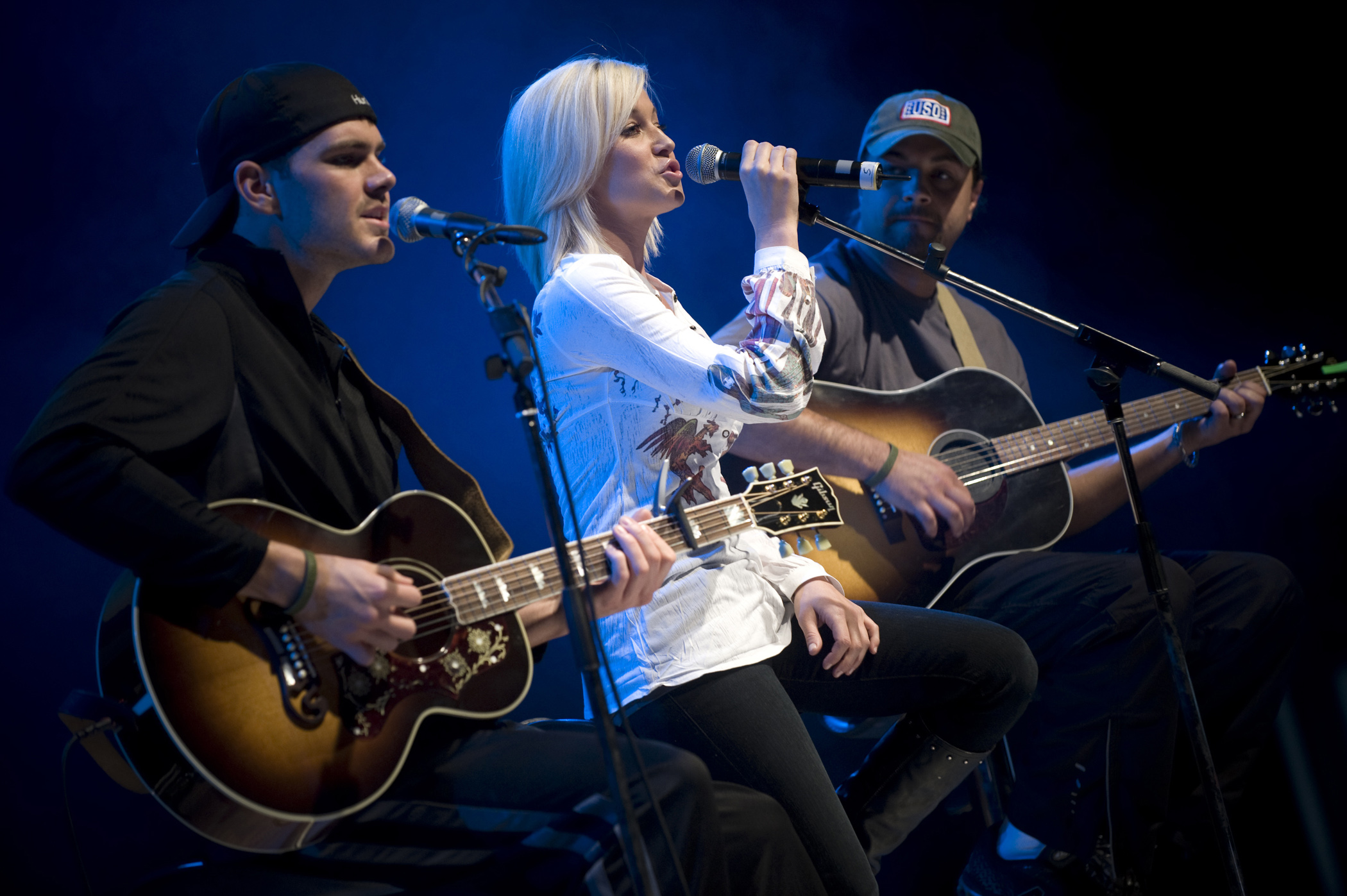
Pickler and members of her band Ryan Ochsner, left, and Joshua Henson perform for U.S. service members during the first stop of the 2008 USO Holiday Tour on Ramstein Air Base, Germany, December 16, 2008

After her elimination, she appeared in numerous shows promoting the TV show and performed the song "Walkin' After Midnight" in some of her appearances.

On May 6, 2006, she returned to Albemarle, North Carolina, for a parade and a reunion with her father. She received a key to the city from the mayor of Albemarle. The mayor also proclaimed the day as "Kellie Pickler Day". Pickler also received numerous awards from local and statewide government officials praising her accomplishments as a contestant on the American Idol television show.

Pickler pursued her recording aspirations in Nashville, Tennessee, shortly thereafter. On July 17, 2006, she signed a record deal with 19 Recordings/BNA Records. She later announced it herself on The View. She was part of the American Idols Live! Tour 2006, performing for three months in various cities. During that period, Pickler worked on her album in collaboration with top industry experts in different cities wherever the tour took her.

=== 2006–07: Small Town Girl ===
Her first single, "Red High Heels", debuted on September 13, 2006, and its music video was officially released on October 26, 2006. It received a nomination for the CMT Video Awards for "Breakthrough Video of the Year". Her debut album, Small Town Girl, released on October 31, 2006, topped Billboard's Top Country Albums and landed at number nine on the Billboard 200 selling over 79,000 copies in its first week, making Pickler the highest-selling first-week sales for a new artist in 2006. The album includes five songs that Pickler co-wrote with songwriters Chris Lindsey, Aimee Mayo, and Karyn Rochelle.

On January 18, 2007, Pickler co-hosted The View and was presented with a gold record by Rosie O'Donnell, certifying that her album has reached the 500,000 sales mark. She also performed her second single, "I Wonder", which is a personal song about her absent relationship with her mother, Cynthia Morton. It was the first performance of the song on national television.

Pickler was nominated for "Top New Female Vocalist" for the 42nd Academy of Country Music Awards.

She was also part of Brad Paisley's "Bonfires & Amplifiers" concert tour from April 2007 through October as one of the opening acts. The tour was booked in at least 37 cities across North America including a couple of stops in Canada.

Pickler appeared in country music artist Brad Paisley's music video "Online" in 2007.

In September 2007, Pickler released a version of "Santa Baby" for a Christmas country compilation. A month later, at the ASCAP Awards in Nashville, Tennessee, Pickler received a songwriter award for co-writing "Red High Heels". She performed "I Wonder", at the 2007 CMA Awards. During the performance, she was visibly overcome with emotion and struggled to even finish the song before bursting into tears. The performance received a standing ovation. She was also nominated for the Horizon Award. The performance led her to receive 3 CMT awards the following April.

=== 2008–10: Kellie Pickler ===
While "Things That Never Cross a Man's Mind" was climbing the country charts (it eventually reached number sixteen), Pickler returned to the studio to record her second studio album for 19 Recordings/BNA Records. She performed the debut single, "Don't You Know You're Beautiful" at the ACM Awards on May 18, 2008, and received a good response from the audience. She was nominated for "Top New Female Vocalist", but the award went to Taylor Swift. "Don't You Know You're Beautiful" was released to radio in June 2008 and peaked at number twenty-one. Her second album, Kellie Pickler, was released on September 30, 2008, and debuted at the top of the country chart, as well as number nine on the Billboard 200, selling over 43,000 copies in its first week. It matched the debuting spots of her first album, Small Town Girl.

On November 12, 2008, Pickler performed the second single from her album Best Days of Your Life at the CMA Awards. She was also nominated for "New Artist of the Year" for the second year in a row, but lost to Lady Antebellum. "Best Days of Your Life" made its radio debut in November 2008, and debuted at number 56. The song climbed very slowly up the chart, but ended up becoming Pickler's first top ten hit on the Hot Country Songs chart. After nearly 40 weeks on the chart, the song peaked at number nine in August 2009. A music video was made by Roman White, featuring Taylor Swift, who co-wrote and sang background harmony vocals on the song. Pickler was nominated for "Female Video of the Year" at the 2009 CMT Music Awards for "Don't You Know You're Beautiful". She lost once again to Swift. She also presented the award for "USA Weekend Breakthrough Video of the Year" with Idol judge Randy Jackson.

Pickler accompanied Swift on the first leg of her Fearless Tour 2009. In June, she launched her first ever headline concert tour in promotion of her self-titled album. On October 8, it was announced that Pickler would be part of the second leg of Fearless Tour. "Didn't You Know How Much I Loved You", a re-recording from Pickler's first album Small Town Girl, was released as the album's third single on August 30, 2009. The song debuted at number 55 on the U.S. Billboard Hot Country Songs chart, and became her fifth top 20 hit, peaking at number fourteen in February 2010. On October 26, Pickler won the title of Country Weekly's poll of most beautiful woman in country music for the second year in a row. Reba McEntire and Carrie Underwood were the second and third places, respectively. "Makin' Me Fall in Love Again" was released as the album's fourth single on April 19, 2010. It debuted at number 53 and peaked at number 30.

=== 2011–12: 100 Proof ===
It was announced that Pickler's third album would be produced by Frank Liddell, known for producing country artist Miranda Lambert's albums. "Tough" was released on June 13, 2011, as the lead-off single to Pickler's third album, 100 Proof, which was released on January 24, 2012. The album debuted at number seven on the Billboard 200 and at number two on the Top Country Albums chart. "Tough" reached a peak of number 30 on the Hot Country Songs chart, while the album's title track, which was released as the second single in April 2012, peaked at number 50 on the same chart.

On June 27, 2012, ABC News Radio reported that Pickler parted ways with Sony Music Nashville. Pickler's manager told ABC News Radio, "Kellie's contract with Sony came to an end and they mutually decided not to renew it". On July 10, 2012, she sang "God Bless America" during the seventh inning stretch at the 2012 Major League Baseball All-Star Game. On October 8, 2012, CMT reported Pickler had signed with the independent record label Black River Entertainment.

=== 2013–present: The Woman I Am ===
Pickler's first single with Black River Entertainment, "Someone Somewhere Tonight", was released on May 14, 2013. After eight weeks, it reached a peak of number 49 on the Billboard Country Airplay chart in July 2013, and served as the lead-off single to Pickler's fourth album, The Woman I Am, which was released on November 11, 2013. Pickler wrote the title track with her husband, songwriter Kyle Jacobs.

"Little Bit Gypsy" and "Closer to Nowhere" were released as the album's second and third singles and reached peaks of number 50 and number 59 on the Country Airplay chart, respectively. A promotional single, "Feeling Tonight," was made available as a digital download on June 2, 2015, but never received an official radio release. It was later announced in June 2016, that Pickler had parted ways with Black River.

On May 21, 2013, Pickler and Derek Hough were announced the winners of the sixteenth season of Dancing with the Stars. She performed a well received super sized freestyle, which scored a perfect 30 and garnered effusive praise from the dance judges. She performed "Little Bit Gypsy" on November 25, 2013, episode in the seventeenth season.

In 2013, Pickler starred as Mirabelle in the fiftieth VeggieTales video, Beauty and the Beet released on October 14, 2014. In February 2022, Pickler began work as a DJ on SiriusXM's country music station, The Highway.

== Personal life ==
Pickler's parents split up the day after her second birthday; a year later, in July 1989, her mother vanished. During periods when her father, Bo, was incarcerated, she would live with her grandparents outside Albemarle, 45 miles (72 km) northeast of Charlotte. In 1992, Pickler's mother returned to Albemarle, but rarely made contact with her. But in March 1995, with Bo Pickler in prison for armed robbery, her mother was granted custody. Pickler was in the fourth grade. In a February 2006 interview with the Charlotte Observer, Pickler said: "She got custody of me for two years... During that time, she was physically and mentally abusive of me." In a 1997 court filing, Pickler's grandparents said that her mother had moved to Union County with her and treated her harshly. The court restored custody to the grandparents. Her mother vanished again. Her father, whom she describes as an alcoholic and drug addict, served a three-year-nine-month prison sentence at Florida State Prison for aggravated assault and battery stemming from a 2003 stabbing incident. He was released on May 6, 2006, a week after her elimination from Idol. In an April 2006 interview with NBC Pickler said, "One thing that's so important in life is we learn to forgive others. I ask the Lord every day to forgive me for my sins and for things that I've done wrong. And who am I to not forgive someone for what they've done?" ..."God tells us to love everyone."

In 2007, Pickler was in a relationship with Nashville Predators player Jordin Tootoo and visited his family in Nunavut. Later that year, the two broke up.

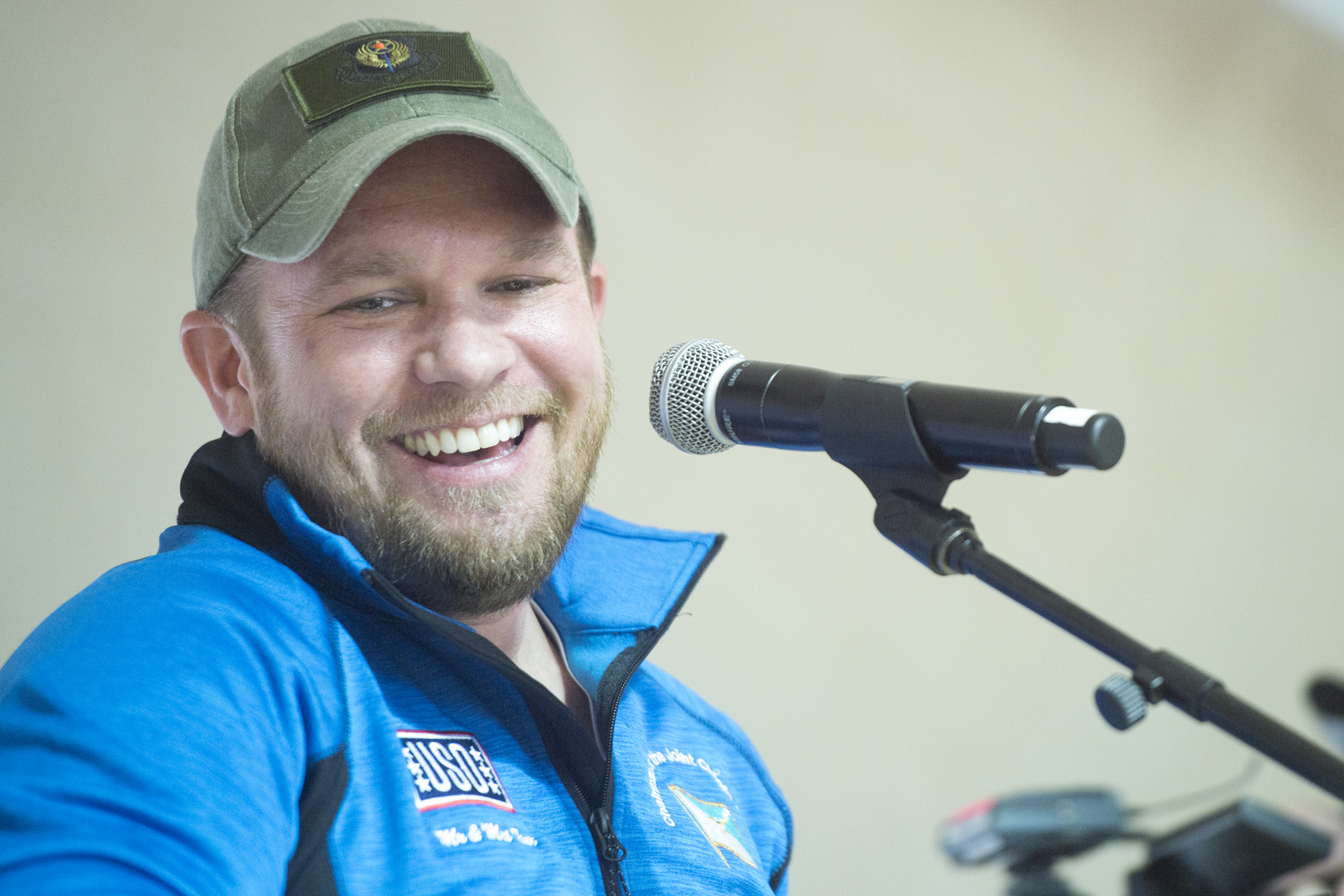
Pickler was married to songwriter Kyle Jacobs from 2011 until his suicide in 2023.

After two and a half years of dating, Pickler became engaged to songwriter Kyle Jacobs on June 15, 2010. For a background piece on Dancing with the Stars, Pickler related that the couple had planned an elaborate ceremony, but as the date approached, "I looked at him and said, 'Baby, this ain't us.'" On January 1, 2011, she and Jacobs eloped and married in a "small, intimate ceremony on a private island in the Caribbean".

In 2015, it was announced that Pickler and Jacobs would star in a 13-episode reality show for CMT entitled I Love Kellie Pickler. The show premiered on November 5, 2015.

On February 17, 2023, Jacobs died by a self-inflicted gunshot wound in Nashville, Tennessee, at the age of 49.

=== Philanthropy ===
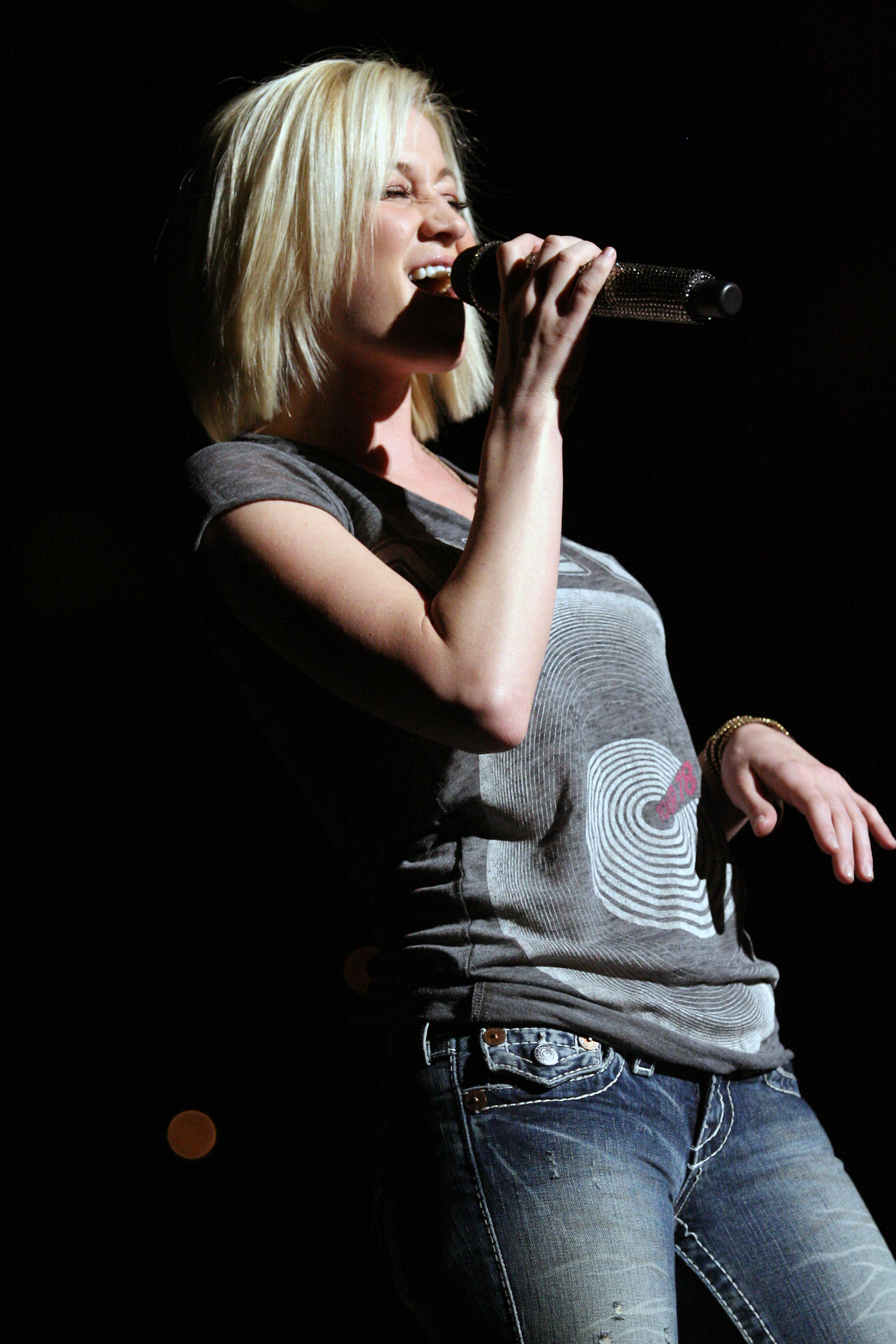
Pickler in Jacksonville, Florida, November 6, 2008

Pickler actively supports St. Jude Children's Research Hospital, where she helps raise funds and gives kids special visits. She also participates in charitable events to help raise funds for various organizations. She has performed to help raise funds for the "N.C. Children's PROMISE" to benefit the Children's Hospital on November 12, 2006, to help refurbish the Hurricane Katrina-damaged NFL Youth Education Towns Boys & Girls Club of New Orleans on December 16, 2006, visited St. Jude Children's Research Hospital on January 12, 2007, and visited Pennington Elementary School on February 1, 2007. "When you're able to give back to your communities and organizations like St. Jude, it's a great thing," Pickler said. "It's been a great experience, and I encourage anyone and everyone to help."

Pickler participated with other country artists in an online auction for charity by Mario Magro: Kiss for a Cause Foundation Celebrity Auction held June 15–25, 2007, in support of orphaned and abandoned children. The event auctioned off celebrity lip prints and signatures pressed on the inside of Mario Magro Crystal Le Coop handbags at the 42nd Annual Academy of Country Music Awards. In November 2007, Pickler appeared on a celebrity edition of the quiz show Are You Smarter Than a 5th Grader?, playing for the charities of her choice, American Red Cross and the AARP's Grandparenting Program. During the show, she was asked to name the European country for which Budapest is the capital, to which she responded "...I thought Europe was a country ...I know they speak French there. Is France a country?" She chose the copy cheat, allowing her to go along with the 3rd grader's correct response of Hungary.

Pickler has participated in three tours on behalf of United Service Organizations. The first, in late 2007 and early 2008, took her to Iraq; the second, in December 2008, included stops in Germany, Afghanistan, Iraq, Kosovo, and England. In January 2010, Pickler made stops in Iraq and Kuwait on a 10-day tour with Randy Houser and Jamey Johnson. The three country stars "played remote bases on the front lines of the war zone, and the sound of gun fire became their frequent companion at night."

In early August 2009, Pickler participated in ABC's Extreme Makeover: Home Edition's rebuilding of James Terpenning's family home in Beavercreek, Ohio. Pickler performed a free concert at the home, and helped during reconstruction.

On June 26, 2016, on an episode of Celebrity Family Feud, Pickler and her team won $25,000 for her charity, USO.

== Dancing with the Stars performances ==
Kellie Pickler performances on Dancing with the Stars
Week #	Dance/song	Judges' score			Result
Week #	Dance/song	Inaba	Goodman	Tonioli	Result
1	Cha-cha-cha/"Domino"	7	7	7	No elimination
2	Jazz/"Lights"	9	8	9	Safe
3	Prom Group Dance/"The Rockafeller Skank"; Jive/"Footloose"	No; 8	scores 9	given 8	Safe
4	Rumba/"Say I Do"	9	8	9	Safe
5	Foxtrot / "It Had to Be You"	9	9	9	Safe
6	Quickstep/"Part-Time Lover"; Team Samba/"Superstition"	9; 8	10; 9	10; 8	Safe
7	Samba/"Shake Your Bon-Bon"	9	10	10	Safe (Immunity)
8	Viennese Waltz/"Fade into You"; Paso doble (Trio Challenge)/"Unstoppable"	9; 10	9; 7	10; 10	Safe
9 Semi-finals	Argentine tango/"Para Te"; Flamenco/"The Pirate That Should Not Be"	10; 9	10; 10	10; 9	Safe
10; Finals	Quickstep/"Peppy and George"; Cha-cha-cha Relay/"Treasure"; Freestyle/"Beneath Your Beautiful"; Instant Jive/"Keep A-Knockin'"	10; Awarded; 10; 10	10; 4; 10; 10	10 points 10; 10	Winner

== Discography ==
- Small Town Girl (2006)
- Kellie Pickler (2008)
- 100 Proof (2012)
- The Woman I Am (2013)

== Tours ==
- Still Feels Good Tour (2007) with Rascal Flatts
- Bonfires & Amplifiers Tour (2007–08) with Brad Paisley
- Love on the Inside Tour (2008) with Sugarland
- Fearless Tour (2009–10) with Taylor Swift
- American Living Unstoppable Tour (2010) with Rascal Flatts
- Nothing Like This Tour (2010) with Rascal Flatts

== Television work ==
Television appearances by Kellie Pickler
Year	Series	Role	Notes
2006	American Idol	Contestant	season 5, 6th place
2007	Are You Smarter than a 5th Grader?	Herself	
2009	Extreme Makeover: Home Edition	Herself	
2011	90210	Sally Butler	
2013	Dancing with the Stars	Herself	season 16 winner with Derek Hough
2014	VeggieTales	Mirabelle (voice)	Episode: "Beauty and the Beet"
2015–2017	I Love Kellie Pickler	Herself	
2016	American Idol	Herself / Mentor	Duet with contestants: Amelia Eisenhauer and Tristan McIntosh
2016	Celebrity Family Feud	Herself	Playing for $25,000 for USO
2016	CMT Hot 20 Countdown	Herself / Guest Host	August 20
2017–2019	Pickler & Ben	Herself / Host	
2018	Christmas at Graceland	Laurel	Hallmark's Countdown to Christmas
2019	Wedding at Graceland	Laurel	Hallmark Movie
2019	The Mistletoe Secret	Aria	Hallmark Movie

Awards and achievements
Preceded by Melissa Rycroft & Tony Dovolani	Dancing with the Stars (US) winners Season 16 (Spring 2013 with Derek Hough)	Succeeded by Amber Riley and Derek Hough
