= Jim Malec =

American journalist and pop music critic

- Occupation(s): Journalist, music critic

Jim Malec is an American journalist and pop music critic known for writing about country music. Malec attended State College of Florida, Manatee-Sarasota, where he worked as an editor for the college's student newspaper and was involved in a censorship dispute regarding student free speech rights. He was named "Best Local Blogger About Country Music" by the Nashville Scene in 2009, with the paper commenting that he is "rough on country music in the way that only a person who loves and thinks deeply about an art form can be." Malec's work has appeared in American Songwriter, Slant Magazine, Westword and other outlets, and he is a contributor to the Nashville Scene's annual country music critics poll.

Malec is noteworthy for his coverage of Taylor Swift in the early stages of her career, referring to her as "a superstar in the making" in 2007. His 2011 article "Taylor Swift: The Garden In The Machine" chronicles Swift's move to Nashville and her integration into the Nashville songwriting community.
