= Karyn Rochelle =

American songwriter

- Origin: Wilmington, North Carolina, United States
- Genres: Country
- Occupations: Singer, songwriter

Karyn Rochelle (born in Wilmington, North Carolina) is an American country music songwriter and vocalist. As a songwriter, she has written or co-written songs which became hits for Trisha Yearwood, LeAnn Rimes, Ronnie Milsap, Sunny Sweeney, and, moving outside of her primary genre into R&B, Kenny G.

== Early life ==
Rochelle's love of music was shared with and encouraged by her mother, a country music singer in a band who would invite Rochelle to join her. She began writing songs at the age of 13. Musical influences in her early life included Debbie Gibson, Suzy Bogguss, Trisha Yearwood, Patty Loveless, Pam Tillis and Mary Chapin Carpenter. At age 18, already an avid songwriter, she began working in Myrtle Beach, South Carolina as a disc jockey and a line dance instructor. She cites a promo cd she encountered by new Nashville artist Matraca Berg as transforming her life. She relocated to Nashville, Tennessee in 1996 at the age of 19 with her good friend and fellow song-writer Shane Stevens to pursue her music goals with the specific intent to develop as a professional singer.

== Career ==
Once in Nashville, Rochelle was advised by another songwriter to pursue demo singing, cutting tracks to help songwriters (including herself) illustrate to artists how a song is meant to sound. She had her first break when her friend Stevens, then working as a waiter, gave her demo to the daughter of music industry professionals, leading to her signing with Crutchfield Music Group and Warner Chappell before, several years later, signing with Famous Music. George Jones was the first to release a single Rochelle had co-written, but far from the last. Over her career, Rochelle has written or co-written songs performed by Lorrie Morgan, Pam Tillis, Kellie Pickler, Reba McEntire, Trisha Yearwood, LeAnn Rimes, Ronnie Milsap, Sunny Sweeney, and Kenny G, among many others, with songs such as "Red High Heels" and "Georgia Rain."

In addition to songwriting, Rochelle has continued singing. She sang back-up for Martina McBride and Blake Shelton, was a member in Garth Brooks' band, and opened for Trisha Yearwood and Garth Brooks. In 2014 she released a self-titled solo album, which she followed up that same year with a Christmas album and, in 2018, with the album Pretty Mess.
