= Chris Lindsey =

American country music songwriter and record producer

- Birth name: Christopher Marsh Lindsey
- Origin: Nashville, Tennessee
- Genres: Country
- Occupation(s): Songwriter, record producer
- Years active: 1999–present
- Website: https://www.aimeelandstudio.com/

Christopher Marsh Lindsey is a Grammy nominated American country music songwriter and record producer. He has created major hits for Taylor Swift, The Civil Wars, Adam Lambert, Carrie Underwood, Kenny Chesney, Kellie Pickler, Keith Urban, Tim McGraw, Faith Hill, Martina McBride, Sara Evans, Lonestar, and many others. Lindsey has over 250 commercial recordings of his songs selling 90 Million records and counting.

== Biography ==
One of his first writing credits was Lonestar's 1999 single "Amazed", which at the time was the first song in 18 years to chart at number one on both Hot Country Songs and the Billboard Hot 100. He also co-wrote the song's followup, "Smile", which was at number one on the country charts while "Amazed" topped the Hot 100. "Amazed" received Broadcast Music Incorporated (BMI) awards for over 5 million spins on radio, plus a Song of the Year award from the same association. It was also the top country song of 1999 according to Billboard Year-End. Lindsey's songs have appeared in the television series Ghost Whisperer and Eli Stone.

Another one of Lindsey's songs, "This One's for the Girls" by Martina McBride, peaked at number 3 on the country charts and number one on Hot Adult Contemporary Tracks. In 2011, it was chosen as a theme for the TV series The View.

Lindsey's production credits include the number one hits "I Breathe In, I Breathe Out" by Chris Cagle and "19 Somethin'" by Mark Wills. Other artists for whom he has produced include Jimmy Wayne, Aaron Lines, Rachel Proctor, Can You Duet winners Caitlin & Will, and American Idol season 9 finalist Casey James. He also produced Kellie Pickler's self-titled second album and co-wrote five songs on it.

Chris Lindsey is the host of songwriting / music podcast Pitch List. Pitch List is part of the American Songwriter Podcast Network.

He is the husband of the hit songwriter and author Aimee Mayo, with whom he has three children, Levi, Oscar and Magnolia. The two own Aimeeland Studios in Brentwood, Tennessee.

== Writing credits ==
- Blake Shelton - "Every Time I Hear That Song"
- Billy Currington - "Nowhere Town", "Tangled Up"
- Lonestar - "Amazed", "Smile", "Don't Forget Me"
- Kellie Pickler - "Small Town Girl", "Red High Heels", "I Wonder", "Don't You Know You're Beautiful", "Didn't You Know How Much I Loved You", "Somebody to Love Me", "One Last Time", "Going Out In Style"
- Tim McGraw - "Drugs or Jesus", "Good Girls", "Let's Make Love" (feat. Faith Hill), "Beautiful People", "Things Change", "Smilin'", "Let Me Love You", "Seventeen", "A Place In The Sun"
- The Civil Wars - "Poison & Wine"
- Faith Hill - "Red Umbrella", "Beautiful", "There Will Come a Day"
- Kris Allen - "Beautiful & Wild"
- Danielle Bradbery - Wild Boy"
- Craig Campbell - "Truck-N-Roll"
- Casey James - "Miss Your Fire"
- Martina McBride - "This One's For The Girls", "Cry Cry ('Til The Sun Shines)", "How I Feel"
- Kip Moore - "Crazy One More Time"
- Adam Lambert - "Sleepwalker"
- Mark Wills - "Rockin' The Country", "I Just Close My Eyes"
- Brendan James - "Nothing For Granted"
- Easton Corbin - "Someday When I'm Old"
- Rascal Flatts - "Tonight Tonight"
- Katharine McPhee - "Say Goodbye"
- Johnny Cooper - "Follow"
- The Wilkinsons - "Paper Dolls"
- Melinda Watts - "There Will Come A Day"
- Sara Evans - "Backseat of a Greyhound Bus", "The Secrets That We Keep"
- Jessica Simpson - "When I Loved You Like That"
- Kenny Chesney - "California", "Because of Your Love"
- Glenda Neace - "I Remember You"
- Laura Bryna - "Out The Window"
- Kristy Lee Cook - "Not Tonight"
- Carrie Underwood - "Wheel of the World"
- Cole Deggs & the Lonesome - "Do You Ever Think About Me"
- Keith Urban - "Your Everything"
- Kelly Allyn - "My Boyfriend's Out of Town"
- Aaron Lines - "Cheaper to Keep Her", "Nothing Like You", "Let's Get Drunk and Fight"
- Mel Kennedy - "There Will Come a Day"
- Calaisa - "Never Looking Back"
- Julie Roberts - "Men & Mascara"
- Jason McCoy - "This Used To Be Our Town", "I'm Gonna Make Her Mine"
- Kinleys - "Crazy Love"
- Carolyn Dawn Johnson - "Simple Life"
- Brittany Wells - "Too Long", "Bittersweet"
- Lorrie Morgan - "Rocks"
- Pam Tillis - "Jagged Hearts"
- Andy Griggs - "Long Enough"
- Rachel Proctor - "Where I Belong"
- Deana Carter - "Liar", "Make Up Your Mind"
- Jimmy Wayne - "Are You Ever Gonna Love Me?", "Trespassin'", "You Are"
- Kristy Starling - "There Will Come a Day"
- Jessica Andrews - "Never Be Forgotten", "Now"
- Laura Turner - "Devoted"
- Lee Greenwood - "Love Is Stronger Than Time"
- Emerson Drive - "How Lucky I Am"
- Kristen Mercer - "There Will Come a Day"
- Tommy Shane Steiner - "Havin' a Good Time"
- J Michael Harter - "Sugar and Gasoline"
- John Berry - "Eternally"
- Jolie & the Wanted - "You Make Me Feel Like a Woman"
- Brian Gowan - "One Good Woman"
- Jo Dee Messina - "Closer"
- Sons of the Desert - "Albuquerque", "Everybody's Gotta Grow Up Sometimes", "When It's Right"
- Chris Cagle - "Are You Ever Gonna Love Me"
- Mindy McCready - "Over and Over", "Thunder and Roses"
- Jennifer Day - "Disappear"
- Colin Raye - "You Will Always Be Mine"
- Joe Diffie - "Houston, We Have a Problem"
- David Michael Frank - "If I Fall Tonight"
- Jim Brickman - "Amazed"
- Emerson Hart - "You Know Who I Am"
- Blue October - "Bleed Out", "Not Broken Anymore"
- Nikki Lane - "Walk of Shame", "Coming Home to You", "Look Away", "Save You"
- Brendan James - "Nothing for Granted"
- Shelly Bonet - "Devoted"
- Maggie Sajak - "Wild Boy"
