= American Idols Live! Tour 2015 =

2015 concert tour

Americans Idol Live! Tour 2015
- Tour by American Idol
- Top 5 contestants from season 14
- Start date: July 7, 2015
- End date: August 28, 2015
- No. of shows: 37

American Idol concert chronology
- American Idols Live! Tour 2014 (2014); American Idols Live! Tour 2015 (2015); American Idol Live! 2018 (2018)

The American Idols Live! Tour 2015 was a summer concert tour in the United States that featured the Top 5 contestants of the fourteenth season of American Idol. The tour began on July 7, 2015, in Clearwater, Florida and ended on August 28, 2015, in Riverside, California. Like the previous tour, the size of venues was smaller, and for the first time, the tour featured the Top 5 instead of the usual Top 10. After not having a live band for the 2014 tour, there was one for this tour. This was initially the last American Idol tour when the show aired on Fox as the 2016 tour was canceled. The tour was, however, revived in 2018.

== Performers ==
Nick Fradiani (Winner)
Clark Beckham (Runner-up)
Jax (3rd place)
Rayvon Owen (4th place)
Tyanna Jones (5th place)

== Setlist ==
1. Top 5 – "Are You Gonna Go My Way" (Lenny Kravitz)
2. Nick Fradiani – "American Girl" (Tom Petty)
3. Clark Beckham – "Georgia on My Mind" (Ray Charles)
4. Jax – "My Generation" (The Who)
5. Jax – "Brick by Boring Brick" (Paramore)
6. Jax – "Are You Gonna Be My Girl" (Jet)
7. Rayvon Owen – "Love Me like You Do" (Ellie Goulding)
8. Owen – "Jealous" (with Beckham and Tyanna Jones on backing vocals) (Nick Jonas)
9. Beckham, Jones and Owen – "Chandelier" (Sia)
10. Jax – "White Flag" (Dido)
11. Jax – "Forcefield" (Jax)
12. Jax – "You Give Love a Bad Name" (Bon Jovi)
13. Beckham, Jax, Jones and Owen – "Lie to Me" (Jonny Lang)
14. Beckham, Jax, Fradiani and Owen – "Bless the Broken Road" (Rascal Flatts)
15. Beckham, Jax, Jones and Owen – "I Bet My Life" (Imagine Dragons)
16. Beckham – "I Won't Give Away" (Clark Beckham)
17. Fradiani – "Honey, I'm Good." (Andy Grammer)
18. Jones – "Lips Are Movin" (with Jax and Owen on backing vocals) (Meghan Trainor)
19. Jax – "Love is Your Name" (Steven Tyler)
20. Owen – "Wide Awake" (with Beckham and Jones on backing vocals) (Katy Perry)
21. Owen – "Thinkin Bout You" (with Beckham and Jones on backing vocals) (Frank Ocean)
22. Beckham – "Earned It" (The Weeknd)
23. Beckham – "Sunday Morning" (Maroon 5)
24. Jones – "Sweet Dreams" (Beyoncé)
25. Beckham – "Give Me One Reason" (Tracy Chapman)
26. Beckham, Jax, Jones and Owen – "People Like Us" (Kelly Clarkson)

Intermission

27. Fradiani – "Coming Your Way" (Beach Avenue)
28. Fradiani – "I Won't Give Up" (Jason Mraz)
29. Fradiani – "No Diggity" (Blackstreet)
30. Fradiani – "Beautiful Life" (with Beckham, Jax, Jones and Owen on backing vocals) (Nick Fradiani)
31. Top 5 – "See You Again" (Charlie Puth)
32. Top 5 – "Some Nights" (Fun)

== Tour dates ==
Date	City (All U.S.)	Venue	Opening Act	Attendance	Revenue
July 7, 2015	Clearwater	Ruth Eckerd Hall	Joey Cook	1,197 / 1,903	$40,360
July 8, 2015	Sarasota	Van Wezel Performing Arts Hall	Joey Cook	—N/a	—N/a
July 9, 2015	Melbourne	Maxwell C. King Center	Joey Cook	648 / 1,500	$31,213
July 11, 2015	Orlando	Hard Rock Live Orlando	Joey Cook	—N/a	—N/a
July 12, 2015	Fort Myers	Barbara B. Mann Performing Arts Hall	Joey Cook	900 / 1,779	$43,586
July 14, 2015	Fort Lauderdale	Parker Playhouse	Joey Cook	663 / 1,164	$46,737
July 15, 2015	Jacksonville	Florida Theatre	—N/a	892 / 1,813	$48,664
July 17, 2015	Nashville	Ryman Auditorium	Sarina Joi Crowe	1,525 / 2,258	$101,833
July 18, 2015	Louisville	Robert S. Whitney Hall	—N/a	—N/a	—N/a
July 19, 2015	Durham	Durham Performing Arts Center	—N/a	1,646 / 1,953	$54,389
July 21, 2015	Baltimore	Joseph Meyerhoff Symphony Hall	—N/a	860 / 1,792	$57,310
July 22, 2015	Morristown	Mayo Performing Arts Center	—N/a	—N/a	—N/a
July 24, 2015	Chautauqua	Chautauqua Amphitheatre	—N/a	—N/a	—N/a
July 25, 2015	Bethlehem	Sands Bethlehem Event Center	—N/a	—N/a	—N/a
July 28, 2015	Worcester	Hanover Theatre	—N/a	—N/a	—N/a
July 29, 2015	Hampton Beach	Hampton Beach Casino Ballroom	—N/a	—N/a	—N/a
July 30, 2015	Portland	Maine State Pier	—N/a	—N/a	—N/a
August 1, 2015	Atlantic City	Circus Maximus	Adam Ezegelian	1,452 / 1,606	$134,357
August 2, 2015	Red Bank	Count Basie Theatre	—N/a	—N/a	—N/a
August 3, 2015	Providence	Veterans Memorial Auditorium	—N/a	—N/a	—N/a
August 5, 2015	New York City	Beacon Theatre	Qaasim Middleton	2,027 / 2,762	$115,577
August 7, 2015	Detroit	Sound Board Theater	—N/a	1,221 / 1,520	$51,941
August 8, 2015	Chicago	Chicago Theatre	—N/a	—N/a	—N/a
August 9, 2015	Indianapolis	Murat Theatre	—N/a	—N/a	—N/a
August 10, 2015	St. Louis	Peabody Opera House	—N/a	—N/a	—N/a
August 12, 2015	Grand Prairie	Verizon Theatre	Trevor Douglas	—N/a	—N/a
August 13, 2015	Houston	Bayou Music Center	Savion Wright	—N/a	—N/a
August 14, 2015	San Antonio	Majestic Theatre	—N/a	—N/a	—N/a
August 16, 2015	Mesa	Ikdea Theater	—N/a	—N/a	—N/a
August 18, 2015	San Diego	Humphrey's	—N/a	—N/a	—N/a
August 20, 2015	Los Angeles	Orpheum Theatre	—N/a	—N/a	—N/a
August 21, 2015	Reno	Grande Exposition Hall	—N/a	—N/a	—N/a
August 22, 2015	Santa Rosa	Ruth Finley Person Theater	—N/a	—N/a	—N/a
August 23, 2015	San Francisco	The Warfield	—N/a	—N/a	—N/a
August 25, 2015	Seattle	McCaw Hall	Daniel Seavey	—N/a	—N/a
August 27, 2015	Saratoga	Mountain Winery	—N/a	—N/a	—N/a
August 28, 2015	Riverside	Fox Performing Arts Center	Adanna Duru	—N/a	—N/a
Total				13,031 / 20,050 (65%)	$725,967
