= Identity (Blair St. Clair album) =

Studio album by Blair St. Clair
- Released: July 21, 2020
- Length: 28:06
- Label: PEG
- Producer: Nick Goldston; nicopop; Jonny Shorr

Blair St. Clair chronology
Call My Life: Remixed (2018)	Identity (2020)

Singles from Call My Life
- 1. "Empty" Released: April 30, 2020; 2. "9 Lives" Released: June 11, 2020

Identity (stylized in all caps) is the second studio album by American drag queen and singer-songwriter Blair St. Clair, released on July 21, 2020. The song "Space Between" features Rayvon Owen.

== Promotion ==
The album's lead single "Empty" was released on April 30, 2020 alongside an accompanying lyric video. "9 Lives" was performed on the premiere of the fifth season of RuPaul's Drag Race All Stars and released as the second single on June 11, 2020, along with a music video directed by St. Clair herself.

"Space Between", featuring American Idol season 14 contestant Rayvon Owen was released as a promotional single on June 16, 2020. Following this, St. Clair released a new song every week counting down until the album's release. "What Do I Gotta Do?", "All Your Exes", "Wanted", "Bad Judgement", and "Take Me Home" were all released as promotional singles on June 23, June 30, July 7, July 14, and July 18, 2020.

== Reception ==
Bernardo Sim of Screen Rant wrote: "On "9 Lives," Blair St. Clair reflects on the finitude and value of life, and grapples with the realization that she must hold herself accountable in this high-stakes world. Blair also rehashes the old adage that people only have one chance to prove themselves, making it imperative for them to seize the moment when an opportunity presents itself. Considering that the queen is currently competing on All Stars 5, the song certainly reads as Blair's self-reminder to not hold herself back."

== Track listing ==
Credits taken from Allmusic and Tidal

No.	Title	Writer(s)	Producer	Length
1.	"Empty"	Andrew Bryson; Nicolas DiPietrantonio; Tyler Mann	nicopop	3:24
2.	"9 Lives"	Caroline Burns; Bryson	Nick Goldston	2:44
3.	"Space Between" (featuring Rayvon Owen)	Bryson; Jonny Shorr; Matthew Peter Von Vooght; Ryan Stewart	Jonny Shorr	3:32
4.	"What Do I Gotta Do?"	Brandon Stansell; Doma Schrank; Maggie Szabo	Shorr	2:57
5.	"All Your Exes"	Bryson; Shorr	Shorr	3:11
6.	"Wanted"	Colleen Evalyn Sherman; DiPietrantonio	nicopop	2:41
7.	"Bad Judgement"	Shorr; Malia Civetz; Nathan Fertig; Parker James Noones	Shorr	3:20
8.	"Take Me Home"	Bryson; Sherman; DiPietrantonio	nicopop	3:17
9.	"It's Been Fun"	Bryson; Sherman; DiPietrantonio	nicopop	3:00
Total length:				28:06

== Credits and personnel ==
Credits adapted from Allmusic

- Andrew Bryson – composer, vocals
- Caroline Burns – composer
- Malia Civetz – composer
- Sam Creighton – composer
- Nick Dipietrantonio – composer
- Dreux – producer
- Nathan Fertig – composer
- Nick Goldston – composer, producer
- Will Jay – composer
- Jack Laboz – composer
- Tyler Mann – composer
- Maylyn Murphy – composer
- Nicopop – composer, producer
- Parker James Noones – composer
- Rayvon Owen – Featured Artist
- Blair St. Clair – Primary Artist, Vocals
- Doma Schrank – composer
- Colleen Evalyn Sherman – composer
- Jonny Shorr – composer, producer
- Brandon Stansell – composer
- Ryan Stewart – composer
- Maggie Szabo – composer
- Mathew Peter Van Vooght – composer
