= Hurricane (Nick Fradiani album) =

Studio album by Nick Fradiani
- Released: August 5, 2016
- Recorded: 2015–16
- Genre: Pop
- Length: 39:34
- Label: 19; Big Machine; Republic; Dot
- Producer: Jerrod Bettis; Nick Fradiani; David Hodges; Julian Raymond; Rykeyz; Jordan Schmidt; Nolan Sipe; Pär Westerlund

Nick Fradiani chronology
Hurricane (2016)	Where We Left Off (2017)

Singles from Hurricane
- 1. "Get You Home" Released: March 11, 2016; 2. "All on You" Released: August 8, 2016

Hurricane is the debut studio album by American Idol season 14 winner Nick Fradiani. It was released on August 5, 2016, through Big Machine Records.

== Background ==
Following Fradiani's Idol win, his label offered a non-target PledgeMusic campaign for pre-orders and merchandise sales. During the six weeks before the start of the American Idols LIVE! tour, Fradiani played a number of radio-sponsored concerts, and worked on new songs with writers including Paul Doucette. In September, following the end of the tour, work on the new album intensified. On May 5, 2016, Fradiani revealed the album's release date and title Hurricane, named after a track co-written with Jason Mraz and with Fradiani's Beach Avenue guitarist, Nick Abraham. Starting in late May 2016, Fradiani released snippets of the recorded versions of various songs from the album, sometimes accompanied by "behind the songs" videos.

== Singles ==
The album's lead single "Get You Home" was released on March 11, 2016. A video was shot on March 29 in Chicago, at Virgin Hotels Chicago, with model Michelle Hicks as the female lead. It was directed by Erik White and used real hotel guests as extras. Released on May 19, 2016, the video shows Fradiani having a "cat and mouse game" encounter, starting at the hotel's bar with a beautiful woman who appears to have no scruples, leading to a steamy night at the hotel and a surprise resolution.

A second single, "All On You," was released on August 5, 2016. On December 15, Billboard provided the exclusive premiere of a stark, black-and-white performance video for the song, shot at New Haven's historic Lyric Hall by Ryan Zipp. A video for the album's third single, "Love Is Blind," was released on January 23, 2017, and features Fradiani surprising a real-life bride and groom for their first dance as a married couple.

== Track listing ==
No.	Title	Writer(s)	Producers	Length
1.	"Every Day"	Nick Fradiani; LP; Pär Westerlund	Westerlund	3:30
2.	"Nothing to Lose"	Fradiani; LP; Westerlund; Marty James	Westerlund	3:22
3.	"In the Long Run"	Fradiani; Jerrod Bettis; Nolan Sipe	Bettis	2:53
4.	"Forget2ForgetU"	Fradiani; Joe Ragosta; Jordan Schmidt; Mitchell Tenpenny	Schmidt	2:41
5.	"Get You Home"	Fradiani; Sipe; Matt Dike; Jaden Michaels; Ross Mike; Matt Parad; Luther Rabb; Jim Walters; Ryan Williamson; Marvin Young	Rykeyz	3:11
6.	"Howl at the Moon"	Fradiani; Kevin Kadish	Kadish	2:39
7.	"Nobody"	Fradiani; Schmidt; Calynn Green; Zach Lockwood	Schmidt	3:46
8.	"Love Is Blind"	Fradiani; Michaels; David Hodges	Schmidt; Hodges	3:09
9.	"All on You"	Fradiani; Schmidt; Tenpenny; Andy Albert	Schmidt	3:06
10.	"Hurricane"	Fradiani; Nick Abraham; Jason Mraz; Michael Natter; Nancy Natter	Schmidt	3:17
11.	"If I Didn't Know You"	Fradiani; Joe Ragosta; Jordan Schmidt; Paul Doucette	Fradiani	4:29
12.	"Beautiful Life"	Chris Carrabba; Ayanna Howard; Ryan Williamson	Julian Raymond	3:28

== Chart positions ==
The album debuted at 121 on the Billboard 200 with sales of 5,000 copies, making it lowest debut from an American Idol winner's first album. It also ranked as #1 on Billboard's Heatseekers chart.

Chart	Peak position
U.S. Billboard 200	121

== Release history ==
Country	Date	Label	Formats
United States	August 5, 2016	Big Machine; Dot; 19	CD; digital download
