= Quentin Alexander =

American singer and artist

- Born: New Orleans, Louisiana
- Origin: New Orleans, Louisiana, United States
- Genres: Pop; R&B; indie; soul
- Occupations: Singer; retail manager
- Instrument: Vocals
- Years active: 2008–present

Quentin Alexander (32–33 years old) is an American singer. He is best known for competing on the fourteenth season of American Idol in 2015.

After Idol, Alexander worked as a manager at French Connection, a men's clothier, in The Shops at Canal Place in New Orleans.

== Early life and education ==
Alexander was born and raised in the Ninth Ward of New Orleans which faced catastrophic damage during and after Hurricane Katrina in 2005. It was a rough area where he lived, but says it made him tough while the city overall made him an artist. He states that growing up was difficult as he could not go out and play in his neighborhood so relied on his imagination. He noted there was always a fight or shooting or something going on so that it wasn't safe outside, but he still sees his hometown as a beautiful and artsy city. He was also bullied in school so had very few friends. Alexander first started singing when he was six, together with his cousins he would "learn, sing, and write songs when we got together." He didn't start pursuing singing until he joined a youth center in his sophomore year in high school.

He is a graduate of McDonogh 35 High School a public high school that was the first for African-American pupils in the State of Louisiana after being converted from an all-white, and all-male elementary school. Alexander's mentor and drama instructor at the school, Troy Populous, encourage him to channel his creative energy into drama class. Populous could see Alexander had charisma, an 'it' factor, and Alexander agreed that he was able to channel his frustration into "something beautiful, which at the time was theater."

Alexander performed in a school production of August Wilson's Fences, and part of a performing troupe who traveled to Paris in 2010 to perform the musical "Ain't Misbehavin'" at the Banlieues Bleues Festival. Alexander states: "Music is one of my only releases. It's an indirect way for me to express myself. It has given me so many opportunities to travel at a young age, introduced me to different people and ways of life." He graduated in May 2011 and currently is a full-time manager at French Connection, a retail clothier for men.

== Musical influences ==
Alexander says that many artists have made impacts on him with a few of his biggest inspirations as Erykah Badu, David Bowie, Andre 3000, Jimi Hendrix, Lenny Kravitz, Lorde, Sia "and the list goes on for miles." He cites Fantasia, Chris Daughtry, Adam Lambert, Joshua Ledet and Jena Irene as his all-time favorite AI performers.

When Idol asked him to name his top three all-time songs he listed "Shake It Out" by Florence & The Machine, "Youth" by Daughter, and "God From The Machine" by Santigold, he said, "The lyrics, heavy drums and almost tribal chanting in these songs are dope." He also said Lorde was definitely a writer he'd like to work with and that she, Santigold, and Erykah Badu are his favorite and most influential artists because "They're each very unique human beings with very distinct voices and styles. I admire their originality and the work they put into their music."

== American Idol ==
=== Overview ===
Alexander first auditioned for the twelfth season of American Idol in 2012 in New Orleans' Mercedes-Benz Superdome where he advanced to sing his reworked version of "Love Potion No. 9" for the executive producers. He since worked at developing himself personally and expressing what he "wants to represent as an artist." He auditioned for the fourteenth season of American Idol and won his ticket to Hollywood Week in June 2014 at Lakefront Arena in New Orleans. Callbacks were also in New Orleans, with this season's celebrity judges all returning from the prior year, Harry Connick, Jr., Jennifer Lopez and Keith Urban, and were held at the Morial Convention Center in August. The show airs in 2015 starting in January. He has practiced a lot of his songs and arrangements both at home and during the early hours of opening the retail store he opened and had a few hours before customers arrived.

Alexander's group round for Hollywood Week was in a quartet where he was the oldest member, they successfully performed Bruno Mars' "Runaway Baby". The top 24 semi-finals showcases were the first time the contestants were in front of a live audience to gain their votes, and filmed in Detroit's historic The Fillmore Detroit in homage to the theme Motown. Alexander performed Screamin' Jay Hawkins' "I Put a Spell on You" to the judges' approval, including judge Keith Urban deeming it "a Grammy performance". For "I Put a Spell on You" he chose it about a week before the show and experimented with American Idol's arranger, he says the song was different every time he did it and is his favorite performance from his competing. He also acknowledged that he needs more technical training to know the argot of arranging and felt lucky he was able to work with people who knew how to translate his vision. For the top 16 show round narrowing the competition to the top 12, ten contestants were chosen by popular votes from ballots cast. Alexander was among the remaining 6 from who the judges chose him and Adanna Duru as wild card choices. For the songs from the movies week he sang Lo-Fang's stripped-down arrangement of Olivia Newton-John and John Travolta's "You're the One That I Want" from the 1978 musical Grease which 'People' magazine said "stole the show".

Alexander advanced to the top 7 with fellow New Orleans singer Joey Cook, who is originally from Virginia but has made the city her new home. The week that Cook was eliminated Alexander was upset that two of his friends Cook and Rayvon Owen hadn't made it into the top six, with those results all delivered on live TV. Alexander was visibly upset and called the situation "whack", something Cook later characterized as heroic, "Quentin is a very emotional person. He's very 'all cards on the table.' There is no sugar coating. He doesn't hide his emotions. He's honest. He's a raw human being, and I think what happened last night was at the perfect example of that and how emotional he is." Cook was eliminated in the 'Top 6' week and Alexander expressed his frustration that she didn't get into the top six. Of the same night Billboard said Alexander "always gives strong interpretations of lyrics and highly conceptual performances". National media outlets reported on the exchange between judge Harry Connick Jr. and Alexander the noting the incident of Connick scolding a contestant was awkward. The producers played up the exchange in what Music Times termed "what seemed like shady circumstances" to replay the incident throughout the week in show promos and at the beginning of the Top 5 show. An AI source also stated that for fairness purposes the judges and contestants have a strict wall of silence between them and only interact onstage so Connick Jr. and Alexander have not had contact since last week.

Alexander was eliminated the next show the following week with what Music Times questioned as possibly the first time American Idol "went into an episode with what seemed to be a very clear agenda." Yahoo's managing editor Lyndsey Parker detailed many points that she argued was American Idol "throwing Quentin Alexander under the tour bus" referring to the idiom of throw under the bus by sacrificing a friend as the show heavily promotes the summer tour which only guarantees the top five finalists will be included. Included in her critique was that the show had aired the promotional video featuring the confrontation which she characterized as "misleadingly edited" to boost ratings which have been historically low, had a surprisingly few negative judges comments, and instead lavish praise for other contestants while Alexander's was pointedly negative, and what Parker saw as a "backhanded and unflattering" exchange from Connick Jr. insinuating Alexander needed Auto-Tune. She also noted that the "Fan Save" portion was handled uniquely in that another contestant Rayvon Owen didn't have a replay or critique until after a commercial break, while Alexander did not get the same treatment, and host Ryan Seacrest claimed Alexander had muttered "I give up" which Alexander had to clarify was actually "I give it up."USA Today echoed the sentiment that the awkward comments likely led to his elimination from the show.

=== Appearance ===
Alexander's personal style and clothing have become a touchstone for viewers and critics of AI. Bustle states that from his style "to his quirky personality and unique voice, Alexander screams “artsy” and “soul” — exactly what Connick, Jr. [also a New Orleans' son] was looking for in his hometown." As part of his competition on the popular television show the producers, and media have noted his unique dress appearance and style. Scott Borchetta, a record executive and on-air contestant coach stated "Quentin has this really cool New Orleans vibe about him. He has these great piercing eyes. Every time he shows up, everybody always wants to know, 'What is Quentin wearing?' because it's always cool, and it's thrift-shop cool. It's like, 'You got that for what? Where?'" In Bustle, entertainment writer Jessica Molinari noted he "performed the song as if he was actually casting a spell on the audience, and that’s what made it so amazing. From his outfit (did you see that fur coat?!), to his hair, to his crazy-intense eye contact, Alexander fully immersed himself in his performance and played a character — and that’s what sets him apart as an artist." Show judge Keith Urban stated, when asked "What is it about him that viewers are responding to?", "He's a conceptual artist, with his sense of arrangement, his interpretation, the way he looks." Heavy said he is "revered for his intensity and his fashion risks" on the show.

After his elimination USA Today stated, "Throughout his run on Idol, Alexander combined a flair for dramatic musical performances with outlandish costumes, gaining confidence and creating some of the season's most memorable moments along the way" Alexander states that he would sketch out or toward the end when it was more hectic just give direction as to what he wanted his style to look like and would work with the show to find a balance between him as an artist verses him as an American Idol.

=== Performances ===
Week	Theme	Song(s)	Original artist(s)
Auditions	Contestant's choice	"Royals"	Lorde
Hollywood Week - group	Group round	"Runaway Baby"	Bruno Mars
Hollywood Week - solo round	Solo round	"Riptide"	Vance Joy
House of Blues (Top 48)	Contestant's choice	"Youth"	Foxes
Top 24	Contestant's choice	"I Put a Spell on You"	Screamin' Jay Hawkins
Top 16	Music of Motown	"Master Blaster (Jammin')"	Stevie Wonder
Top 12	"Back to the Start"	"Royals"	Lorde
Top 11 (first week)	"Get the Party Started"	"Rolling in the Deep"	Adele
Top 11 (second week)	Songs from the Movies	"You're the One That I Want"	John Travolta and Olivia Newton-John
Top 9	Songs from the 1980s	"In the Air Tonight"	Phil Collins
Top 8	Kelly Clarkson	"Dark Side"	Kelly Clarkson
Top 7	Billboard Hot 100	"Latch"	Disclosure feat. Sam Smith
Top 6	"American classics" as deemed by viewers	"Are You Gonna Go My Way" "The Sound of Silence"	Lenny Kravitz; Simon & Garfunkel
Top 5	"Arena anthems"	"Light My Fire" "Shake It Out"	The Doors; Florence & the Machine
Finale performance	Reprise performance duets from top ten	"Riptide" duet with Vance Joy	Vance Joy

== Discography ==
=== Singles ===
- "In The Air Tonight", American Idol, Top 11, Season 14 (2015)
- "Dark Side", American Idol, Top 9, Season 14 (2015)
- "Latch", American Idol, Top 8, Season 14 (2015)
- "Sound of Silence", American Idol, Top 7, Season 14 (2015)
- "Light My Fire", American Idol, Top 6, Season 14 (2015)

== Also ==
- American Idol controversies
