= Alexis Gómez =

Alexis Gómez may refer to:

- Alexis Gómez (baseball) (born 1978), Dominican baseball outfielder
- Alexis Gómez (footballer) (born 2000), Argentine footballer
- Alexis Gomez (singer), American singer, musician, and songwriter

== See also ==
- Alexi Gómez (born 1993), Peruvian footballer
