= Beach Avenue =

Beach Avenue may refer to:

- An American band with Nick Fradiani as the lead singer
- A major thoroughfare in Cape May, New Jersey
