= Blair St. Clair =

American drag performer and recording artist

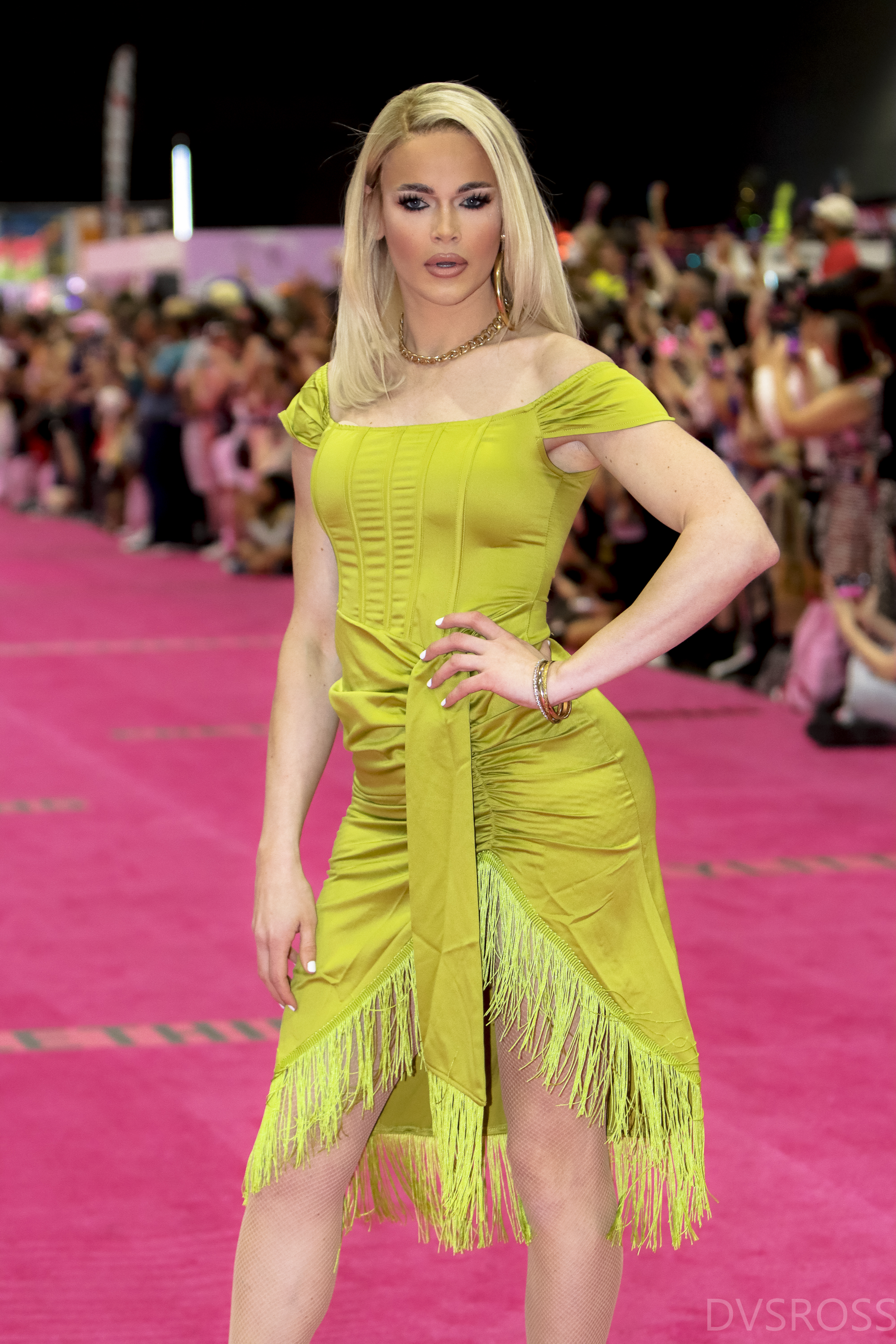
- Blair St. Clair at RuPaul's DragCon LA, 2022
- Born: May 16, 1995 (age 30); Indianapolis, Indiana, U.S.
- Occupations: Drag queen; singer; hair stylist
- Television: RuPaul's Drag Race (season 10); RuPaul's Drag Race All Stars (season 5)
- Musical career
- Genres: Pop; dance
- Instrument: Vocals
- Label: Producer Entertainment Group
- Website: blairstclair.com

Blair St. Clair (born May 16, 1995) is an American drag queen, singer, and hair stylist known for competing on the tenth season of the reality competition series RuPaul's Drag Race, as well as the fifth season of RuPaul's Drag Race All Stars.

Her debut album Call My Life, which was released in June 2018, reached number one on the Billboard Dance/Electronic Sales Chart. It spawned two singles - "Now or Never" and "Call My Life", which reached the top ten on the Dance chart. The follow-up album, Identity, was released in July 2020. It was preceded by singles "Empty" and "9 Lives".

== Early life and education ==
St. Clair was born to Peggy Bryson in Indiana on May 16, 1995. She attended Perry Meridian High School in Indianapolis where she participated in theater.

== Career ==
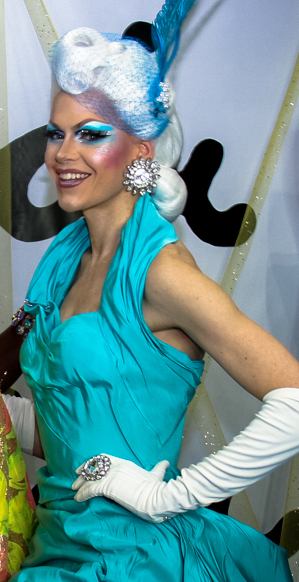
Blair St. Clair at RuPaul's DragCon LA in 2018

St. Clair first rose to prominence when she won the title of Miss Gay Indiana in 2016. She was revealed as one of fourteen contestants on the tenth season of RuPaul's Drag Race before the official cast was announced due to getting arrested for a DUI violation. She is the first contestant from Indiana to compete on the show. She was the sixth contestant eliminated on a lipsync to Diana Ross' "I'm Coming Out", losing to The Vixen, and placing ninth.

St. Clair's grand finale dress was designed by Project Runway alumnus Mondo Guerra. After the show, she walked for Guerra's collection at FashioNXT in October 2018. In late 2019, St. Clair launched Hair by Blair with the intent to sell lace front and full lace wigs online; and, shortly after moving back to Indianapolis, St. Clair opened a full-service salon under the same name to take in clients.

=== Music ===
One day after her elimination episode, St. Clair released her debut single, "Now or Never", on April 27, 2018. The song's music video features Jinkx Monsoon, Manila Luzon, and Max Emerson.

St. Clair released a follow-up single, "Call My Life", with a music video on June 26, 2018. Her seven-track debut album of the same name was released three days later. Drag Race alumna Alaska is featured on the album's sixth track, "America's Sweetheart". The album peaked at number one of the Billboard Dance/Electronic Sales Chart. A remix EP of the "Call My Life" single was released on August 10, 2018. It features Dave Audé, Chris Cox, DrewG., Hector Fonseca, Zambianco and Ralphi Rosario. She released her third single, "Irresistible" with a music video on October 25, 2018. Blair St. Clair released her single "Easy Love" on July 12, 2019. On April 30, 2020, Blair released her single "Empty", followed by "9 Lives" and six promotional singles from her second studio album Identity, released on July 21, 2020.

== Personal life ==
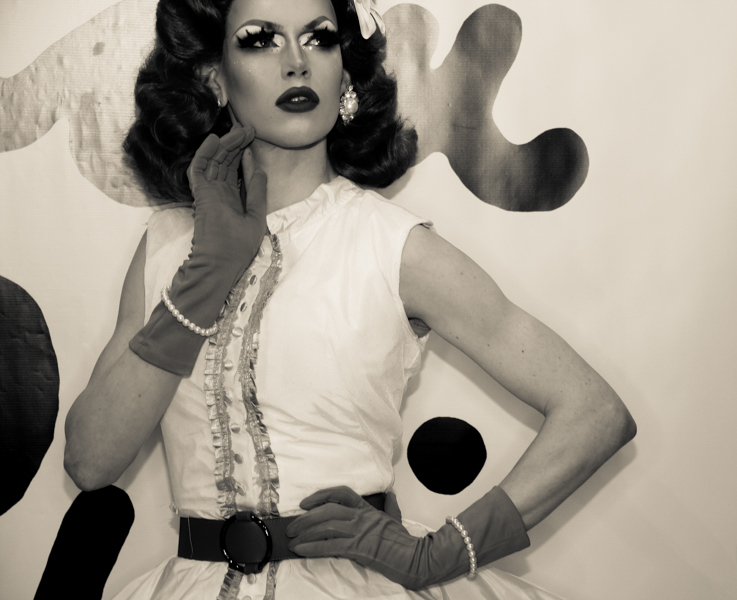
Blair St. Clair, 2018

The first part of St. Clair's drag name came from the character Blair in Gossip Girl while the second part was suggested by her mother after she had passed St. Clair Street in downtown Indianapolis. St. Clair has mentioned using the name Blair and female pronouns in her personal life and is non-binary.

St. Clair was raped at a college party, which she shared on RuPaul's Drag Race. In 2018, Drag Race winner Bianca Del Rio controversially made a joke at one of her comedy sets about St. Clair's decision to bring up the rape on Drag Race upon finding out she was up for elimination. Del Rio received backlash from fans and fellow queens including St. Clair herself. In November 2019, fellow drag queen Trinity The Tuck brought Blair onto her podcast and encouraged her to speak with Bianca about said joke.

== Filmography ==
=== Television ===
Year	Title	Role	Notes	Ref
2018	RuPaul's Drag Race	Herself	Contestant - 9th Place	
2018	RuPaul's Drag Race: Untucked	Herself	Contestant - 9th Place	
2020	RuPaul's Drag Race All Stars	Herself	Contestant - 4th Place	
2020	RuPaul's Drag Race All Stars: Untucked	Herself	Contestant - 4th Place	

=== Web series ===
Year	Title	Role	Notes	Ref.
2018	Cosmo Queens	Herself	Guest	
2018	Queen to Queen	Herself	Guest, with Mayhem Miller	
2018	Countdown to the Crown	Herself	Season 10	
2018	How to Makeup	Herself	Guest	
2020	Supbruh	Herself	Guest	

=== Music videos ===
Year	Title	Ref
2018	"Now or Never"	
2018	"Call My Life"	
2018	"Irresistible"	
2020	"9 Lives"	
2022	"GAGA"	

== Discography ==
Blair St. Clair discography
- Studio albums: 2
- Singles: 6
- Remix albums: 1
- Promotional singles: 6

=== Studio albums ===
Title	Details	Peak chart positions		
Title	Details	US Dance/ Elec.	US Heat	US Indie
Call My Life	Released: June 28, 2018; Label: Producer Entertainment Group; Format: CD, digital download	1	11	34
Identity	Released: July 21, 2020; Format: Digital download; Label: PEG	—	—	—
"—" denotes a recording that did not chart or was not released.

=== Remix albums ===
Title	Details
Call My Life: Remixed	Released: August 10, 2018; Label: Producer Entertainment Group; Format: Digital download

=== Singles ===
As lead artist

Title	Year	Peak chart positions		Album
Title	Year	US Dance	US Dance/ Elec.	Album
"Now or Never"	2018	—	— (Note: "Now or Never" did not enter the Billboard Dance/Electronic Songs chart but did peak at number 18 on the Dance/Electronic Digital Song Sales chart.)	Call My Life
"Call My Life"	2018	8	46	Call My Life
"Irresistible"	2018	—	—	Call My Life
"Easy Love"	2019	—	—	Non-album single
"Empty"	2020	—	—	Identity
"9 Lives"	2020	—	—	Identity
"—" denotes a recording that did not chart or was not released.

As featured artist

Title	Year	Album
"I'm in Love" (with the cast of RuPaul's Drag Race All Stars, Season 5)	2020	Non-album single
"Tonight Or Forever" (Jujubee featuring Blair St. Clair)	2020	Good Juju : Vol. 2

=== Promotional singles ===
Title	Year	Album
"Space Between" (featuring Rayvon Owen)	2020	Identity
"What Do I Gotta Do?"	2020	Identity
"All Your Exes"	2020	Identity
"Wanted"	2020	Identity
"Bad Judgement"	2020	Identity
"Take Me Home"	2020	Identity

=== Other appearances ===
Title	Year	Other artist(s)	Album
"Last Christmas"	2018	—N/a	Christmas Queens 4

== See also ==
- LGBTQ culture in New York City
- List of LGBTQ people from New York City
