= Call My Life =

2018 studio album by Blair St. Clair

Studio album by Blair St. Clair
- Released: June 28, 2018
- Genre: Electronic
- Length: 23:39
- Label: Producer Entertainment Group

Blair St. Clair chronology
Call My Life (2018)	Call My Life: Remixed (2018)

Singles from Call My Life
- 1. "Now or Never" Released: April 27, 2018; 2. "Call My Life" Released: June 27, 2018; 3. "Irresistible" Released: October 24, 2018

Call My Life is the debut studio album by American drag queen and singer Blair St. Clair, released in June 2018. She is the first queen from RuPaul's Drag Race to have a debut album top one of the Billboard charts.

== Promotion ==
Music videos were created for "Now or Never" and "Call My Life". The former video was directed by Shawn Adeli and Brad Hammer, and features appearances by Max Emerson, Jinkx Monsoon, and Manila Luzon. The music video for "Call My Life" features drag queens Eureka, Jujubee, Manila Luzon, Mayhem Miller, and Pandora Boxx.

== Track listing ==
Track listing adapted from the iTunes Store.

No.	Title	Writer(s)	Length
1.	"Call My Life"	Ashley Levy; Tomas J. Costanza; Paul David Coultrup; Andrew Bryson	4:06
2.	"Irresistible"		3:09
3.	"One Day at a Time"		3:05
4.	"Now or Never"	Levy; Bryson	3:24
5.	"Barricade"		3:37
6.	"America's Sweetheart" (featuring Alaska Thunderfuck)		3:03
7.	"Now or Never" (Remix)		3:45
Total length:			23:39

== Charts ==
Chart (2018)	Peak position
US Dance/Electronic Albums (Billboard)	1
US Independent Albums (Billboard)	34
US Top Heatseekers Albums (Billboard)	11

== Call My Life: Remixed ==
Call My Life

Remix album by Blair St. Clair
- Released: August 10, 2018
- Length: 47:16
- Label: Producer Entertainment Group

Blair St. Clair chronology
Call My Life (2018)	Call My Life (2018)	Identity (2020)

Call My Life: Remixed is a remix album by American drag queen Blair St. Clair as a companion to her debut studio album Call My Life on August 10, 2018. It consists entirely of remixes of the album's title track.

=== Track listing ===
No.	Title	Length
1.	"Call My Life" (Dave Audé Club Remix)	5:31
2.	"Call My Life" (Chris Cox Club Remix)	5:52
3.	"Call My Life" (DrewG. Club Remix)	5:46
4.	"Call My Life" (Hector Fonseca & Zambianco Club Remix)	5:50
5.	"Call My Life" (Ralphi Rosario Club Remix)	6:45
6.	"Call My Life" (Dave Audé Radio Edit)	3:40
7.	"Call My Life" (Chris Cox Radio Edit)	3:22
8.	"Call My Life" (DrewG. Club Remix)	3:37
9.	"Call My Life" (Hector Fonseca & Zambianco Radio Edit)	3:22
10.	"Call My Life" (Ralphi Rosario Radio Edit)	3:31
Total length:		47:16
