= American Idol controversies =

The American singing competition show American Idol (2002–2016; 2018–present) has generated controversy over the years in numerous areas.

Many of the controversies have centered on the show's voting process and results, and in later seasons, gender bias against female contestants, as well as contestant comments. Another major source of controversy that has spanned multiple seasons has been the activities of contestants prior to competing on the show such as past recording contracts in contravention of the rules, and undisclosed criminal charges.

== Voting controversies ==
Voting has been the biggest source of controversy with American Idol becoming embroiled in numerous controversies in various seasons over the voting process and its results.

=== Season 1 autodialer power-voting ===
Around 100 people using auto-dialing software and their home dial-up modems reportedly placed as many as 10,000 votes a night. However, FremantleMedia, which produces the show, contended that this represented a 'statistically insignificant' proportion of the overall voting, and Fox insisted that the system was fair. Nevertheless, concerns were raised about possible unfairness in the situation of a tight vote. One of the show's executive producers, Ken Warwick, later indicated that equipment was put in place afterwards to address this issue but it has not detected any such problem since its installation.

=== Season 2 finale vote ===
Out of 24 million votes recorded following the second season finale, Ruben Studdard finished just 130,000 votes ahead of Clay Aiken. There was confusion over the winning margin as host Ryan Seacrest initially announced it as 13,000, later again 1,335, and then finally corrected by Fox as 130,000. There was much discussion in the communication industry about the phone system being overloaded, and that potentially more than 230 million calls were dropped just by AT&T and SBC (over 30% of the market), making the results statistically invalid. The phone lines may have been running at capacity that made a near-tie inevitable, with the winner potentially decided by text-messaging which was unaffected by capacity problem.

In an interview prior to the start of the fifth season, executive producer Nigel Lythgoe revealed for the first time that Aiken had led the fan voting from the wild card week onward until the finale.

=== Season 2 phone scam ===
During the second season, a phone scam operation based in Salt Lake City, Utah was discovered, in which people were tricked into believing that viewers could vote for their favorites through an 800 number, rather than the 866 number used on the show.

=== Season 3 Jennifer Hudson's ouster ===
At top seven, the three African American singers Fantasia Barrino, LaToya London, and Jennifer Hudson, dubbed the Three Divas, all unexpectedly landed at the bottom three. Jennifer Hudson was eliminated, prompting much discussion and criticism. Elton John, who was one of the mentors that season, called the results of the votes "incredibly racist" (though Barrino went on to win the competition). Criticisms were also voiced about the voting system that resulted in survival of contestants such as John Stevens and Jasmine Trias over Jennifer Hudson and LaToya London, despite constant negative reviews from the judges on the former two. It was claimed that Jasmine Trias' fans were able to vote early and often outside of the 2-hour voting window, and a disproportionate number of votes came from Jasmine Trias' home state of Hawaii.

=== Season 4 voting numbers mix-up ===
During the Top 11 performance show, three of the contestants had their numbers mixed up with the wrong numbers appearing on the screen, resulting in millions of votes being voided. Recordings of the performances were therefore reshown on the Wednesday show with new, live commentary from the three judges, and the audience revoted. The elimination night was moved to Thursday.

=== Season 5 Chris Daughtry's vote-off ===
In the week finalist Chris Daughtry was voted off, some voters claimed that phone calls dialed for Daughtry during the first few minutes of voting were misrouted to Katharine McPhee's lines, and they heard her recorded message thanking them for voting. Simon Cowell, one of the judges, predicted McPhee to leave over Daughtry before the final result was announced. Other voters claimed similar problems voting for other contestants, in some cases resulting in votes going to Daughtry that were intended for another contestant, Elliott Yamin.

=== Season 6 voting campaign for Sanjaya ===
This season saw a concerted attempt to influence the outcome of the vote in American Idol, led most notably by Howard Stern and Vote for the Worst. Howard Stern encouraged his listeners to vote for Sanjaya Malakar who had become a phenomenon in the sixth season, and to take delight in possibly "ruining" Idol.

=== Season 6 Melinda Doolittle's vote-off ===
Melinda Doolittle's departure stunned fans and critics alike. Simon Cowell admitted that the sixth season's crown should have rightfully gone to Melinda. Executive producer Nigel Lythgoe responded, noting that "[Idol producers] were so engrossed with the mentors and didn't really focus on the Melinda Doolittles of the show." Lythgoe also produces So You Think You Can Dance, and has noted that the dance program gives background information about its contestants, while American Idol focused more on its big-name celebrity mentors, such as Tony Bennett, Gwen Stefani, and Jennifer Lopez.

=== Season 8 phone numbers ===
In the top thirteen in the eighth season, the expected phone number for finalist Alexis Grace, IDOLS-13, was not owned by American Idol, but by a company called Intimate Encounters, who used it as a sex line. Although host Ryan Seacrest made ample mention of the replacement phone number, IDOLS-36, some commentators feared that the phone number confusion could have led to Grace being inadvertently voted off the show. However, she was not voted off that week.

=== Season 8 finale vote: "Textgate" ===
In May 2009, following allegations in the media of an American Idol texting scandal dubbed "Textgate", one of American Idol's corporate sponsors, AT&T, admitted providing free mobile phones and texting services for fans of Kris Allen (who won the competition) at parties organized on the night of the program's final episode. Company representatives also provided Allen's supporters with lessons in how to send "power texts" which send ten or more votes with the touch of a single button. Bobby Kierna, one of the 2,000 guests who attended just one of the events, told reporters that she had voted for Allen 10,840 times. AT&T denied attempting to "fix" the contest and apologized, saying that employees had been "caught up in their enthusiasm" and promised that they will in future "celebrate the competition, not individual contestants".

While speculations were rife over the reasons for Allen's win over Adam Lambert, in a statement, Fox said that an independent monitor was employed to oversee the voting process to ensure the competition results were "fair, accurate and verified."

=== Season 9 semifinals shock eliminations ===
Michael Slezak of EW stated, "So you’d think by season 9 — during the inconsequential semifinals, no less — it would be easy to brush off the bad judgment of speed-texting tweens, to process the way-too-early exits of Lilly Scott, Katelyn Epperly, and Alex Lambert (plus the sort-of-maybe-too-early ouster of Todrick Hall), and move on. So why do the ritual killings of the dreams of four indisputably flawed semifinalists feel like they’re part of something bigger, a shifting of the tectonic plates at the core of the Idol universe?"

=== Season 9 Siobhan Magnus' vote-off ===
Siobhan Magnus's elimination caused a stir among the judges and fans of the show. The controversy grew when it was discovered that a phone number printed on Facebook was not a number to vote for Magnus, but to vote for Aaron Kelly. Some commentators speculated that the phone number mix-up may have led to Magnus's exit. An unsuccessful campaign to bring Magnus back into the show was started by her fans.

=== Gender and ethnic biases ===
American Idol faced criticism for implications of gender and ethnic bias in its finalists; for five consecutive seasons—seven through eleven—the winner of American Idol was a guitar-playing, Caucasian male. The string of winners led to complaints by critics, who classified them as being a "white guy with guitar" (WGWG), and felt that the likely winner of the program had become too predictable due to the repeated victories by such performers.

The first five contestants eliminated from the finals in the tenth season were all female, which led some critics to believe that it was partly due to the demographic of the voters being skewed towards women who tended to vote for men. Idol producer Ken Warwick said, "It's no secret that most reality shows are female driven, either by moms or by young girls. It does mean we're going to get a heftier amount of female votes and it's always bent towards the boys, obviously, we are very much aware that the voting can be skewed towards the boys." In response to the criticism, the producers considered tweaking the voting format for the following season to correct the bias. The last of these five girls to be eliminated was a presumed front-runner, Pia Toscano, and her elimination drew considerable criticisms, with various former Idol alums and celebrities such as Ashton Kutcher and Tom Hanks expressing shock and surprise.

Prior to the eleventh season finale, which saw the victory of the fifth "WGWG" winner Phillip Phillips, American Idol: The Untold Story author Richard Rushfield explained that the notions of attractiveness and personality of these contestants had influenced their victories, stating that "You have this alliance between young girls and grandmas and they see it, not necessarily as a contest to create a pop star competing on the contemporary radio, but as ... who's the nicest guy in a popularity contest," and going on to say that these tactics had "led to this dynasty of four, and possibly now five, consecutive, affable, very nice, good-looking white boys." Jessica Sanchez's loss in the eleventh season finale has been retrospectively cited by observers as one of the factors for the show's prolonged steep viewership decline following the said season on both of Idol's latter runs on Fox and ABC.

=== Season 12 Angie Miller vote-off ===
Angie Miller's elimination drew considerable criticisms. Miller was considered a fan-favorite, often placing in the voting's top ranks and becoming the season's sole finalist to not land in the bottom group until her elimination in the Top 3. The elimination was described by journalists as "shocking" and "surprising".

=== Season 13 Malaya Watson vote-off ===
Malaya Watson's elimination caused stir amongst many fans with some stating that the judges use of the "Judges Save" on April 3, 2014 should have been used on her. Some said that Malaya deserved to win and others announced that they would no longer watch the show as they were outraged by her elimination. Judge Jennifer Lopez revealed in an interview that she was outraged and disappointed with the result and believed that Malaya did not deserve to be eliminated from the show; then added that she wished she could've done something about it. American Idol eleventh season runner-up Jessica Sanchez stated on Twitter her anger and disappointment with Malaya's elimination. Stating "Mad and disappointed about it Malaya should have been safe. #idoldisagree" Dozens of American Idol reviewers also stated their disappointment and outrage with the result saying that Watson did not deserve to go home.

=== Season 19 Murphy ouster ===
Nineteenth season contestant Murphy was not picked for the Top 24 by the judges. His elimination was noteworthy on Twitter, with the hashtag #BringBackMurphy being used most often.

=== Season 19 Arthur Gunn comeback ===
Nineteenth season added a comeback round where contestants from the previous season competed to earn a place in the live shows. When eighteenth-season runner-up Arthur Gunn was selected for this contest alongside several semifinalists, fans claimed he was being given an unfair advantage. Gunn won the contest and joined the competition at the final ten. His comeback was unpopular with many fans, with some claiming that the nineteenth season was rigged for him to win at the expense of favorites such as Grace Kinstler or Willie Spence, who had been part of the series from the beginning. An unsuccessful campaign to disqualify Gunn from the competition was started by fans of the contestants that originally auditioned for the nineteenth season. Gunn was eventually eliminated during the top seven round.

== Career control ==
American Idol had come under fire for maintaining what some claim to be total control of the careers of the contestants that sign with their company, 19 Entertainment. The contract the contestants are required to sign gives Simon Fuller's company the right to oversee not just the recording deal for American Idol stars, but also control any merchandising, touring, sponsorship and movie deals. It also gives the producer the right to "record any and all behavior of the contestant 'in and in connection with the series' and use the contestant's likeness, voice and any or all biographical material, whether true or false, any way they want to", and forbade the contestants to reveal anything about the show where any breaches of confidentiality can result in damages assumed to be in excess of $5 million.

According to National Geographic Channel investigator and journalist Eric Olsen, "Branding" is what Fuller is all about. Lucian Grainge, chairman and chief executive of Universal Music U.K. was quoted as saying:

He redefines the role of manager for the 21st century. He treats pop acts as brands, to be exploited over different media, rather than human performers who make money selling records and playing concerts. He is a genius — he makes everyone else look like complete amateurs.

In his article, Olsen was critical of Fuller for the contract that his contestants must sign, where the finalists become essentially "forever and throughout the universe" properties of 19 Management.

On July 29, 2009, Lyndsey Parker at Yahoo's "Reality Rocks" headlined "Ex-Idol Contestant Says Show Is Rigged", reported that Ju'Not Joyner charged that, "It's a fixed thing if I ever saw one," and that, after initial competitions, when winners reach a serious stage, a bad contract is offered, a "slavetract". Joyner claimed that he was cut out of further competition at this late stage, because, "I have a son to feed. I HAD to ask questions and know what I was signing. Plus I write my own songs and I needed to know details" of what rights he'd be giving up. He charged that he was told, essentially, "Just shut up and sign," or else he'd lose the next round. He speculated that perhaps the reason Kris Allen had beaten runner-up Adam Lambert was that the producers weren't satisfied with what Lambert had accepted.

== Contestants ==
=== Season 1 ===
- Delano Cagnolatti, a contestant who successfully made it through to the semi-finals, later revealed that he lied about his age to escape the cutoff date set in the rules. He was quickly disqualified and replaced by Ejay Day, thus becoming the first American Idol contestant to be disqualified.
- Jim Verraros was the first openly gay contestant on the show. He was told by FOX to remove all gay comments from his online journal. Verraros later explained, "It wasn't because I was gay. It was because they thought I was trying to gain more votes and have that little extra edge."

=== Season 2 ===
- Corey Clark was disqualified just nine hours after it was revealed on The Smoking Gun that he had undisclosed pending criminal charges. Later in 2005, first in Globe magazine, then in an hour-long ABC's Primetime special, as well as a book They Told Me to Tell the Truth, So ... (The Sex, Lies, and Paulatics of One of America's Idols), he claimed to have had an affair with Paula Abdul. He played a voicemail message from someone sounding like Abdul in which she said "if the press are trying to talk to you, say absolutely nothing." He also claimed that Abdul helped him with his look and song selection so he could advance further in the competition. He further claimed that he was disqualified not for his criminal past, but rather for "making waves" by getting other contestants to insist on their own lawyer before they would sign their contract, a move that he asserted he had done following Abdul's advice. An investigation by external counsel later found that claims by Corey Clark "have not been substantiated by any corroborating evidence or witnesses, including those provided by Mr. Clark," and cleared Paula Abdul. Following the investigation, Idol enhanced its non-fraternization policy in their rules in order to prevent further controversies between contestants and those affiliated with the show.
- Semi-finalist Jaered Andrews was also disqualified. It was later revealed that he was arrested on an assault charge, a charge he had previously disclosed to Idol, and that he was later acquitted of.
- Semi-finalist Frenchie Davis was removed from the competition when topless photos of her surfaced on an adult website purportedly featuring underage content.

=== Season 5 ===
- Terrell and Derrell Brittenum were twins who were featured prominently on the auditions and successfully made it past the Hollywood rounds in the fifth season, but were subsequently arrested for identity theft and disqualified.
- Mandisa was voted off following her performance of "Any Man of Mine" that she prefaced with a statement about being free from certain addiction and lifestyle that some interpreted as anti-gay. It was revealed she supported Beth Moore who espoused the Ex-gay movement. Mandisa denied that her statement has anything to do with gay lifestyle; rather, it was about her lifestyle of addiction to food.
- An obsessive fan of Paula Abdul named Paula Goodspeed (born Sandra McIntyre), who had unsuccessfully auditioned before the judges, was found dead from an apparent suicide near Abdul's home in 2008. Abdul later criticized the show for allowing Goodspeed on, and claimed that Goodspeed has been "a stalker" of hers who had sent her "disturbing letters" for over a decade.

=== Season 6 ===
- There was controversy surrounding the judges' comments over the audition of a Special Olympics participant named Jonathan Jayne, with Simon Cowell making fun of his weight. In that same episode, Cowell told Kenneth Briggs, a contestant with facial deformities caused by Aarskog syndrome, that he looked like a bush baby. The comments were suggested to be "a new low" for American Idol in The New York Times. Facing backlash, Cowell backtracked on his "bush baby" remark. The show's producers later donated $1,500 to the Milwaukee County Zoo for it to name its own bush baby 'Simon'. American Idol producer Ken Warwick responded by saying that "It's not a conscious decision. It's just that the further we go in the series, there are less and less good singers, so the numbers are made up by more bad ones." Warwick said that he thinks everyone has the right to audition, and added that in some instances when there are singers with certain disabilities who just want to meet the judges, the producers will "turn the cameras off and bring them in. We give them a good experience."
- A website featured salacious pictures of the sixth season contestant Antonella Barba. These pictures have received mainstream attention including a full segment concerning the controversy on the February 26, 2007 edition of FOX News' The O'Reilly Factor and also on MSNBC's Countdown with Keith Olbermann, both of which showed screenshots from Vote for the Worst pages featuring these images. It was later proven that the more explicit images, depicting sexual acts were not of Barba, but of an unnamed woman with a resemblance to Barba.
- A gay contestant named Ian Benardo, who auditioned in New York and was later invited back to the final, sued American Idol in 2011 claiming the show hired him to play an "extra flamboyant" character and abandoned him after making him "the most hated contestant ever". Benardo further alleged he had been subject to homophobic slurs from producers and stars on the show. The lawsuit was dismissed.

=== Season 7 ===
- The seventh season contestant Carly Smithson stirred up controversy due to a prior major label record deal she had with MCA Records. It was reported that MCA spent over 2 million dollars promoting Smithson's previous album Ultimate High, which she made under the name Carly Hennessy. The album was claimed to have sold only 378 copies, but has since been made available on iTunes. Randy Jackson also worked for MCA as the senior vice president of A&R during the same period of time that Smithson was signed. It has led to suggestions by some that she was placed there by the producers, perhaps to avoid having another Sanjaya Malakar, or to ensure a more professional and marketable artist wins. According to a poll conducted by AOL Television, 63 percent of those polled believed that contestants who have already had record deals should not be contestants on American Idol.
- Other contestants, such as Robbie Carrico, also had prior record deals – he had a minor hit in 2000 with the single "Messed Around", as well as opening for Britney Spears in 1999 as a member of Boyz N Girlz United. Others reported to have record deals included finalists Michael Johns and Kristy Lee Cook.
- David Hernandez, one of the top 12 in the seventh season, was revealed by Vote for the Worst to have worked as a male stripper in Phoenix, Arizona. According to the owner of Dick's Cabaret, Hernandez's job included a routine featuring full nudity and performing lap dances for male clientele.

=== Season 8 ===
- The eighth season semifinalist Joanna Pacitti raised a lot of parallels to Carly Smithson when it was revealed that Pacitti had a prior record deal with A&M Records. She had recorded a song used in the film Legally Blonde, "Out from Under"; a song that was featured on the soundtrack of the film Bratz, which was later re-recorded by Britney Spears; and a 2006 record deal after she changed to Geffen Records and released This Crazy Life. She made the semifinals for the eighth season; however, after it was alleged by Star Magazine that she may have a connection with two executives of 19 Entertainment, Pacitti was disqualified from the show. She was then replaced by Felicia Barton, who did not make the Top 13.

=== Season 9 ===
- Chris Golightly, who had originally been selected for the top 24, was disqualified on February 15, 2010 for being in a recording contract at the time of his original audition. Golightly later provided documentation indicating that his recording contract was no longer binding at the time of his original audition; however, this was disputed by his management who claimed he signed a new 2-year contract two months before his audition. He was replaced by Tim Urban.
- Todrick Hall, a top 16 finalist who used to be a children's play director, came under fire on February 20, 2010 for charging several parents a $50 fee for auditioning for a musical called "Oz, the Musical". The musical got cancelled, but money charged for the auditions was never refunded. Hall, however, denied that he, being the director rather than the producer, was ever involved in the financial aspect of the production. Hall was ultimately eliminated before the top 12.

=== Season 11 ===
- Jermaine Jones, one of the top 12 of the eleventh season, was disqualified on March 13, 2012, for failing to disclose past criminal charges to the Idol producers. Jones was charged with two crimes in 2011, one involving violence, and had 4 outstanding warrants since his arrests. Jones, however, denied that he had concealed his previous arrests, as he had admitted his arrests when he signed up for Idol. A police official in a New Jersey town where he is the target of two arrest warrants said that "the case wasn't big enough to merit going after him", and that for the show "to expose, embarrass, and interrogate a young man without an attorney in front of 40 million viewers was an outrage". Critics suggested that the show may have staged the disqualification to boost ratings.

=== Season 19 ===
- Caleb Kennedy, who had been voted into the top five in nineteenth season, left the competition on May 12, 2021 after a controversial Snapchat video resurfaced online showing Kennedy sitting next to an unidentified person wearing what appears to be a Ku Klax Klan hood. He later apologized for the unexpected incident.

== Overtime broadcast ==
During the sixth and seventh season finales, the show went over its scheduled 2-hour time limit and ended at 10:09 PM EST. Many DVR users claimed the recording ended before the new winners (Jordin Sparks and David Cook) were announced shortly after 10 PM. FOX executives apologized, and during the eighth season Top 2 performance show, host Ryan Seacrest warned viewers that the finale would run overtime.

On the April 7, 2009 performance episode of the eighth season, the show ended nearly eight minutes past its set ending time. This caused viewers who recorded the program to completely miss the show's final performance, Adam Lambert's performance of "Mad World" by Tears for Fears, which received a standing ovation from judge Simon Cowell.

On the April 21, 2010 Idol Gives Back special, the show went over its scheduled 2-hour slot to 10:24 PM ET. Seacrest did warn viewers at the end of the previous night's performance show that the episode would run overtime. Due to this, Tim Urban, the contestant that was eliminated that night, did not get to sing his final song.

== Other controversies ==
=== Kelly Clarkson at 9/11 commemoration ===
Immediately after winning American Idol on September 4, 2002, Kelly Clarkson was arranged to sing "The Star-Spangled Banner" by her then management company, 19 Entertainment, at a special commemoration the following week for the first anniversary of September 11 attacks at the Lincoln Memorial. It drew criticisms that the producers of American Idol were turning a somber occasion of national mourning into a "giant promotional opportunity". Clarkson considered withdrawing from the commemoration, saying that "I think it is a bad idea. If anybody thinks I'm trying to market anything, well, that's awful" and added, "I am not going to do it." However, she was unable to withdraw from the event.

=== Ruben Studdard's Flava Jersey ===
During the course of the second season, Ruben Studdard became known for wearing 205 Flava jerseys representing his area code. Shortly after the end of the contest Studdard sued 205 Flava, Inc for $2 million for using his image for promotional purposes. Flava responded by alleging that Studdard had accepted over $10,000 in return for wearing 205 shirts, and produced eight cashed checks to validate their claim. The allegations, if true, were a clear violation of the American Idol rules. The lawsuit was later settled out of court.

=== Virginia Tech massacre ===
On April 17, 2007, a day after the Virginia Tech Massacre, after the critique of his performance, contestant Chris Richardson and Ryan Seacrest were discussing the massacre, when the camera switched over to Simon Cowell, who appeared to be rolling his eyes either at the tragedy or Richardson's invoking of it. Cowell claims he was actually speaking to Paula Abdul and did not hear Richardson mention the tragedy. The next day, executive producer Nigel Lythgoe issued a statement about what really happened on the show, and on the results show that night, Cowell stated that he would never disrespect any of the victims. A screen clip was then shown depicting Cowell and Abdul talking with an inset of Richardson and Seacrest talking. The clip demonstrated that Cowell and Abdul did have a brief exchange as the contestant began his statement. However, neither Abdul nor Cowell were speaking at the mention of the words Virginia Tech and Cowell looked directly at Richardson as he completed his statement of support for the students.

=== Ryan Seacrest's results show spoiler ===
Prior to the March 17, 2010 results episode of the ninth season delayed airing on the west coast, Ryan Seacrest tweeted the outcome of the episode, which angered some fans. That episode of the show then suffered "the smallest audience among 18–49 year-olds for a regularly scheduled in-season episode in Idol history."

=== Paula Abdul judges song before it's sung ===
For the seventh season Top 5 episode, originally aired April 29, 2008, the judging was modified in order to fit two songs per contestant into the show. Rather than judging each performance, the judges waited until each contestant had sung once, then were to give a quick critique of each contestants' first song. When the judging came to Paula, she commented on Jason Castro's first song, then proceeded to critique his second song that he had not yet sung. This led to speculation that the show was scripted or rigged. The next day, Abdul claimed on Seacrest's radio show that she listened to the performances in rehearsal and in the rushed atmosphere of the show was confused and thought she was supposed to critique both.

=== Judges' critique in season 10 ===
During the tenth season online critics from major news sources like Brian Mansfield of USA Today, Dalton Ross of Entertainment Weekly, Andrea Reiher of Zap2it, and Tom Gliatto of People Magazine criticized the judges for being too nice, not being honest enough, offering hardly any constructive criticism towards the contestants, and for not giving any guidance and direction for the viewers/voters in terms of why they should or should not be voting for someone. Executive producer Ken Warwick responded to these criticisms and said, "The truth of the matter is these kids are very good and I wouldn't influence the judges to say anything they don't absolutely believe ... They are trying to keep things on the straight and narrow. What they feel are genuine feelings, that's all I can ask them to do." Nigel Lythgoe, another executive producer, also responded to these criticisms on his Twitter that "IT IS NOT ABOUT THE JUDGES OPINION IT'S ABOUT YOURS!! U R NOT SHEEP!"

=== Season 10 Lee DeWyze finale involvement ===
Many fans of ninth season winner, Lee DeWyze, were upset that he did not take part in the tenth season finale like he was rumored to. Executive producer Nigel Lythgoe responded on his Twitter that he asked DeWyze to take part in the finale, but he declined, "I was so upset Lee DeWyze wouldn't present the winners trophy to Scotty," he wrote. "Especially as he'd been on the show this Season. I guess he was shy." However, DeWyze said that he was actually not asked to take part in the finale. "Just for the record ... I was not asked to be involved in the Finale. It wasn't until about 2 minutes before they announced that Nigel had approached me and asked if he could "borrow" me for a second. I didn't feel a last second jump on stage was appropriate. It was Scotty's moment. I appreciate American Idol, and the opportunity it has given me. And the people who have made that show possible. I am not angry, or bitter etc. It was an amazing Finale, and I would have loved to be a part of it. I just wasn't asked." DeWyze was seen in the audience towards the end of the show.

=== Season 11 Jennifer Lopez music video ===
The music video of Jennifer Lopez's song, "Dance Again", which aired on the program, was criticized as inappropriate for younger viewers. Dan Gainor of the right-wing Culture and Media Institute wrote, "Even the supposedly family-friendly TV shows like American Idol are never safe in the hands of Hollywood," and went as far as saying her "skanky new video shows how desperate she is to retain her fame despite her fading relevance. Such sexualized videos aren't appropriate for any children to watch, including Lopez's own twins." Jenna Hally Rubenstein from MTV Buzzworthy also commented about the video's content not being appropriate for a family show, "we thought "Idol" was a family show? This video is less "sit on the couch and chill with dad" and more "call your boyfriend over immediately." Ed Masley from AZ central.com said that the video was on the verge of being too "steamy" for the show.

=== Season 12 judges' feud ===
A video was leaked to TMZ in October 2012 that showed Nicki Minaj erupting in a tirade against Mariah Carey during the audition in Charlotte, North Carolina for the twelfth season. The video showed Minaj yelling at Carey saying "I'm not going to put up with her fucking highness anymore." According to Barbara Walters of The View, Carey claimed that Minaj had said: "If I had a gun, I would shoot the bitch," a claim that Minaj then denied. Former judge Steven Tyler had said that he feels that the feud was a publicity stunt and nothing more.

=== Season 13 Caleb Johnson comment ===
During his interview with AfterBuzz TV following the Top 5 elimination show, Caleb Johnson made offensive remarks about his fans who tweet him song suggestions. "[Twitter] gives access to a bunch of retards to talk to me," Caleb said. "I don't really enjoy having to see somebody telling me what song I have to sing. I think at this point of the competition, I can pick and choose my own songs and represent me. I don't need 10,000 people saying, 'You should sing this, you should sing that. Listen to me!' Fortunately, guys, I'm going to listen to myself, whether you like it or not."

His comment has been described as "arrogant", with some fans turning against him. After his fans expressed outrage on Twitter, Caleb issued an apology on his Facebook page. "For the record that juvenile comment I made in the interview was not directed towards my fans but to the wackos that send hundreds of hate messages a day to me! You guys are amazing and I cannot thank you enough for your support. Sorry if it offended anybody it was the wrong choice of words. Also I greatly appreciate it when you guys give me song suggestions but it gets really overwhelming at the volume it comes in so please understand ! Rock on !:)"

=== Season 14 awkward exchange of comments ===
National media outlets reported on an exchange between judge Harry Connick Jr. and contestant Quentin Alexander noting the incident of Connick scolding a contestant was awkward. On the live airing of the Top 6 show, there were three contestants who had not been saved when Alexander was chosen. After he performed, host Ryan Seacrest noted that he appeared to be upset. When asked Alexander responded "This sucks, we've got two of the best vocalists, my best friend [Joey Cook] sitting over there. This whole thing is whack, but I'm going to shut up right now." Seacrest then replied saying that this is a competition, and with the save anything could happen. When Alexander had left the stage, Connick Jr. said, "Quentin, if it's that whack, then you can always go home, because Idol is paying a lot of money to give you this experience and for you to say that to this hand that is feeding you right now, I think is highly disrespectful." Alexander was then prompted by the producers to return to the stage where he approached the judges and clarified he meant the two being potentially eliminated was whack, not the show, or the experience. Later, after performing his second song, he explained "I understand that these things are going to happen, and I just didn't want my friend to leave" and apologized. Judge Jennifer Lopez empathized with Alexander's emotions running high but said that as an artist he had to learn to work through that even when it happens to put on the performance. Joey Cook commented after being eliminated on Alexander's statements:

I pretty much just told him what he did was beautiful, in my opinion, and it was the perfect representation of him. Quentin is a very emotional person. He's very 'all cards on the table.' There is no sugar coating. He doesn't hide his emotions. He's honest. He's a raw human being, and I think what happened last night was the perfect example of that and how emotional of a person he is.

American Idol played up the exchange in a promotional spot aired on the same channel and confirmed they will replay the incident at the beginning of the Top 5 show as part of the recap of the previous week. An AI source also stated that for fairness purposes the judges and contestants have a strict wall of silence between them and only interact onstage so Connick Jr. and Alexander have not had contact since last week. Alexander was eliminated the next show the following week with what Music Times questioned as possibly the first time American Idol "went into an episode with what seemed to be a very clear agenda."
