= Loren Lott =

American actress and singer (born 1992)

- Born: September 9, 1992 (age 34)
- Occupations: Actress; singer
- Years active: 2008–present

Loren Lott (born September 9, 1992) is an American actress and singer. Lott appeared in a regular role as Ana Hamilton on The Young and the Restless (2018–2019, 2024) and as Lucy Conrad on The Porter (2022).

== Career ==
She was also a Top 24 semifinals contestant on the fourteenth season of American Idol. She reached the Top 16 by votes, but fell shy of the Top 12—and was unable to obtain a wild-card slot. Thus, she was eliminated at that level of the competition.

Lott was in the company of two notable Broadway musicals, following her time on Idol. First, she portrayed the quadruple roles of Esther Gordy Edwards; Lula Mae Hardaway; Gladys Horton; plus, one of the Vandellas, in Motown: The Musical (2016). She was also an understudy for the role of Diana Ross.

Next, she served as a "Storyteller" amongst the ensemble cast; and an understudy/later replacement for the leading role of Ti Moune, in Once on This Island (2017)—winner of the Tony Award for Best Revival of a Play.

== Filmography ==
=== Film ===
Year	Title	Role	Notes
2008	Edges of Darkness	Undead Soldier	
2009	Devil's Creek	Church Member	Short
2014	Far from the Altar	Felicia	
2014	Quick Trip	Neicy	
2016	Deficiency Notice	Sierra	
2016	Elephant in the Room	Zoey	Short
2017	Men of God	Andrea	Short
2018	The Products of the American Ghetto	Rose	
2018	Tag	Sable's Girlfriend	
2020	Turnt	Singer	
2020	Stay	Bella	Short
2021	Favorite Son	Amber	
2021	Star Trek Renegades Ominara	Young Ominara	
2022	A Wesley Christmas	Cydney Wesley	TV movie
2022	The Night Before Christmas	Simone Adam	
2023	Praise This	Kelly	
2023	Binged to Death	Lexy	
2023	A Wesley Christmas Wedding	Cydney Wesley	TV movie
2023	Favorite Son Christmas	Amber	TV movie
2024	Once in a Valentine	Celeste	

=== Television ===
Year	Title	Role	Notes
2014	The Game	Girl in Crowd	Episode: "He's a No-Good, Lyin', Cheatin', Honky-Tonk Man!"
2014	Fatal Attractions	Chantelle Hopkins	Episode: "Sins and Secrets"
2014–2016	College Boyfriends: The Web Series	Teyanna Griffin	Recurring Cast: Season 2–3
2015	American Idol	Herself/Contestant	Contestant: Season 14
2016	Powers	Torch Singer	Episode: "Funeral of the Century"
2017	Greenleaf	Soloist	Episode: "Strange Bedfellows"
2017	The Quad	Michelle	Episode: "The Caged Bird Sings"
2017	Tales	Kristi	Episode: "A Story to Tell"
2017	Twisted Mines	Tara	Episode: "Episode #2.1"
2018–2024	The Young and the Restless	Ana Hamilton	Regular Cast
2020	Cherish the Day	Rika	Recurring Cast: Season 1
2022	The Porter	Lucy Conrad	Main Cast
2023	A House Divided	Adia	Recurring Cast: Season 5
2024	Churchy	Latrice Jackson	Recurring Cast: Season 1
2024	All American: Homecoming	Valerie	Episode: "New Normal"
2024	Based on a True Story	Miss-Marple	Episode: "Double Fault"
2025	Bel-Air	Young Vivian	Episode: "What Are You Doing for Thanksgiving?"
