= Rayvon Owen =

American singer (born 1991)

- Born: June 27, 1991 (age 35); Richmond, Virginia, U.S.
- Genres: R&B, pop
- Occupation: Singer
- Instrument: Vocals
- Years active: 2015–present
- Website: rayvonowen.com

Rayvon Owen (born June 27, 1991) is an American singer and musician. He is notable for appearing on the fourteenth season of American Idol, where he finished in fourth place. Owen served as the host for the reality competition series The Sims Spark'd.

== Early life ==
Rayvon Owen was born in Richmond, Virginia on June 27, 1991. He graduated from Henrico High School and Belmont University and worked as a singer and vocal coach.

== Music career ==
=== 2014: Early career ===
Rayvon has his own music video, "Sweatshirt" which premiered in November 2014. He also has a debut EP Cycles.

=== 2015: American Idol ===
He auditioned for the fourteenth season of American Idol with "Wide Awake" by Katy Perry and was chosen for Top 24 and eventually Top 12. After being in the bottom three in the top 11 (which guaranteed two people would be eliminated), Owen was deemed safe. Owen was in the bottom two for five consecutive weeks, but emerged victorious, thanks to the Idol Twitter Fan Save, where the bottom two perform and fans vote on Twitter for who should advance. Owen was the only recipient of the fan save in the entire season earning him the nicknames "Twitter King" and "Comeback Kid". Owen finished in fourth place and was included on the Idols Live Tour.

==== Performances and results ====
Episode	Theme	Song choice	Original artist	Order	Result
Audition	Auditioner's Choice	"Wide Awake"	Katy Perry	N/A	Advanced
Hollywood Round, Part 1	First Solo	"Ordinary People"	John Legend	N/A	Advanced
Hollywood Round, Part 2	Group Performance	"Since U Been Gone"	Kelly Clarkson	N/A	Advanced
House of Blues (Top 48)	Second Solo	"Lay Me Down"	Sam Smith	N/A	Advanced
Top 24 (12 Men)	Personal Choice	"Jealous"	Nick Jonas	12	Advanced
Top 16	Motown	"My Girl"	The Temptations	7	Safe
Top 12	Personal Choice	"Wide Awake"	Katy Perry	8	Safe
Top 11	Party Songs	"Burn"	Ellie Goulding	6	Safe
Top 11	Movie Night	"Staying Alive"	Bee Gees	11	Bottom 3^{1}
Top 9	Songs from the 1980s	"Everybody Wants to Rule the World"	Tears for Fears	8	Bottom 2^{2}
Top 8	Evening with Kelly Clarkson	"Since U Been Gone"	Kelly Clarkson	6	Bottom 2^{3}
Top 7	Billboard Hot 100	"Set Fire to the Rain"	Adele	7	Bottom 2^{4}
Top 6	American Classics	"Long Train Runnin'"	The Doobie Brothers	6	Bottom 2^{5}
Top 6	American Classics	"Always on My Mind"	Gwen McCrae and Brenda Lee	12	Bottom 2^{5}
Top 5	Arena Anthems	"I'm Not the Only One"	Sam Smith	5	Bottom 2^{6}
Top 5	Arena Anthems	"Go Your Own Way"	Fleetwood Mac	10	Bottom 2^{6}
Top 4	Judges Hometown	"Need You Now"	Lady A	4	Eliminated
Top 4	Soul	"Believe"	Justin Bieber	7	Eliminated

- ^Note 1 When Ryan Seacrest announced the results in the particular night, Owen was in the bottom 3, but was the only contestant declared safe as both Adanna Duru and Maddie Walker were eliminated.
- ^Note 2 When Ryan Seacrest announced the results for this particular night, Owen was in the bottom 2, but was declared safe by Twitter vote as Daniel Seavey was eliminated.
- ^Note 3 When Ryan Seacrest announced the results for this particular night, Owen was in the bottom 2, but was declared safe by Twitter vote as Qaasim Middleton was eliminated.
- ^Note 4 When Ryan Seacrest announced the results for this particular night, Owen was in the bottom 2, but was declared safe by Twitter vote as Joey Cook was eliminated.
- ^Note 5 When Ryan Seacrest announced the results for this particular night, Owen was in the bottom 2, but was declared safe by Twitter vote as Quentin Alexander was eliminated.
- ^Note 6 When Ryan Seacrest announced the results for this particular night, Owen was in the bottom 2, but was declared safe as Tyanna Jones was eliminated.

=== 2016-present: New music ===
On the Valentine's Day weekend of 2016, Owen debuted a new single, "Can't Fight It" written with Mylen, Nate Merchant, and Isaiah Tejada. The accompanying music video acts as his official "coming out" as gay, sharing a kiss at the end with LGBT activist Shane Bitney Crone. Owen told Billboard: "You'd be surprised at the amount of times I tried to pray the gay away from me or tried to tell God to take this away from me. No kid should have to do what I did and pray to not be who they are. That's why I think it's important even in 2016 to say this."

In January 2018, Owen was picked as Elvis Duran's Artist of the Month. He was featured on the Today where he performed his single "Gold."

== Personal life ==
On February 14, 2016, Owen premiered a music video for his song "Can't Fight It", at the end of which he kisses a man. That same day, Owen's interview with Billboard was published in which he came out as gay. One day later, Shane Bitney Crone, who is featured as the romantic lead in the music video, announced that he and Owen are a couple. On March 3, 2018, they announced they would be getting married, after Crone proposed to Owen on stage at a Demi Lovato concert.

== Discography ==
=== EPs ===
Album	Details	Track listing
Cycles	Released: August 26, 2014; Writers: Rayvon Owen, Cameron Bedell, David Smith, Ryan Key, Stevie Aiello, Ross Bridgeman, Seth Jones; Producers: Seth Jones, Ross Bridgeman	1. "Rescue" (3:43); 2. "Can't Pretend" (3:24); 3. "Air" (3:53); 4. "Sweatshirt" (3:46)

=== Singles ===
- 2016: "Can't Fight It"
- 2018: "Gold"
- 2020: "Space Between" (with Blair St. Clair)

Digital singles

Year	Song
2015	"Everybody Wants To Rule The World"
2015	"Since U Been Gone"
2015	"Set Fire to the Rain
