= Clark Beckham =

American singer, songwriter and musician

- Born: May 15, 1992 (age 34); Nashville, Tennessee, U.S.
- Origin: White House, Tennessee
- Genres: Pop, soul
- Occupations: Singer, songwriter
- Instruments: Vocals; guitar; piano
- Years active: 2011–present
- Label: Quincy Jones Management (2017)

Clark Beckham (born May 15, 1992) is an American singer, songwriter and musician. He finished as the runner-up on the fourteenth season of American Idol.

== Early life ==
Beckham was born in Nashville, Tennessee, but grew up in White House, Tennessee. He is an only child. He graduated from Lee University with a degree in history. Clark got most of his musical experience playing in church and on street corners. In a Christian Post interview Beckham noted that he originally wanted to audition for American Idol at 18 years old, when it came to Nashville, but said that it was not in line with God's will at the time.

== Career ==
=== American Idol ===
Beckham auditioned for American Idol singing "It's a Man's, Man's, Man's World" by James Brown. He was the first contestant at the first city, Nashville, Tennessee, to sing in front of the judges. He passed the audition by a split decision: approved by Jennifer Lopez and Keith Urban, disapproved by Harry Connick Jr. During Hollywood week, he sang "Let's Get It On" and "Try a Little Tenderness". In the House of Blues showcase, he sang "Georgia on My Mind", earning his spot in the Top 24.

When asked what one moment stands out for him, Beckham said the time Connick Jr. said, "I don't think you could have done that any better"—after Beckham's performance of Stevie Wonder's "Superstition". "Harry's typically been tough on me," said Beckham. "He's like a coach trying to get the best out of me. And I really appreciate that."

==== Performances on American Idol ====
Week	Theme	Song(s)	Original artist(s)	Order	Result
Auditions	Contestant's choice	"It's a Man's Man's Man's World"	James Brown	N/A	Advanced
Hollywood Week (Pt. 1)	A Capella	Let's Get It On	Marvin Gaye	N/A	Advanced
Hollywood Week (Pt. 2)	Group round	"Signed, Sealed, Delivered"	Stevie Wonder	N/A	Advanced
Hollywood Week (Pt. 3)	Solo round	"Try a Little Tenderness"	Otis Redding	N/A	Advanced
House of Blues (Top 48)	Contestant's choice	"Georgia on My Mind"	Ray Charles	N/A	Advanced
Top 24	Contestant's choice	"When a Man Loves a Woman"	Percy Sledge	6	Safe
Top 16	Music of Motown	"The Tracks of My Tears"	The Miracles	5	Safe
Top 12	"Back to the Start"	"It's a Man's Man's Man's World"	James Brown	9	Safe
Top 11 (week 1)	"Get the Party Started"	"Takin' It to the Streets"	The Doobie Brothers	4	Safe
Top 11 (week 2)	Songs from the Movies	"Sunday Morning" (from Cheaper by the Dozen 2)	Maroon 5	9	Safe
Top 9	Songs from the 1980s	"Every Breath You Take"	The Police	7	Safe
Top 8	Kelly Clarkson	"The Trouble with Love Is"	Kelly Clarkson	7	Safe
Top 7	Billboard Hot 100	"Make It Rain"	Foy Vance	5	Safe
Top 6	"American classics" as deemed by viewers	"Superstition" "Moon River"	Stevie Wonder; Audrey Hepburn	2; 7	Safe
Top 5	"Arena anthems"	"Yesterday" "Boyfriend"	The Beatles; Justin Bieber	3; 8	Safe
Top 4	Judges' Hometown; Contestant's own soul	"Living for the City" "Your Man"	Stevie Wonder; Josh Turner	1; 5	Safe
Top 3	Scott Borchetta's Choice; Judges' Choice; Hometown's Choice	"Beautiful Day" "(Sittin' On) the Dock of the Bay" "Earned It"	U2; Otis Redding; The Weeknd	1; 5; 7	Safe
Top 2	Favorite Performance; Simon Fuller's Choice; Winner's Single	"Georgia on My Mind" "Ain't No Sunshine" "Champion"	Ray Charles; Bill Withers; Clark Beckham	1; 3; 5	Runner-up
Finale	Encore with original artist	"Centuries" (Feat. Fall Out Boy & Nick Fradiani) "Takin' It to the Streets" (Feat. Michael McDonald)	Fall Out Boy; The Doobie Brothers	N/A	Runner-up

=== Post-Idol ===
Beckham has been using his post-Idol expertise in the creation of a YouTube video channel about American Idol. In May 2021, he appeared on the Talent Recap show to discuss the nineteenth season finale. Beckham will also appear in the upcoming film An Old Song.

== Discography ==
=== Albums ===
- Light Year (2020)

=== EPs ===
- Clark Beckham (2013)
- Songs About Her (2014)
- American Idol Season 14: Best of Clark Beckham (2015)
- Year One (2018)

== Accolades ==
Year	Association	Category	Result
2015	Teen Choice Awards	Choice Music: Next Big Thing	Nominated
