= Nick Fradiani =

American singer (born 1985)

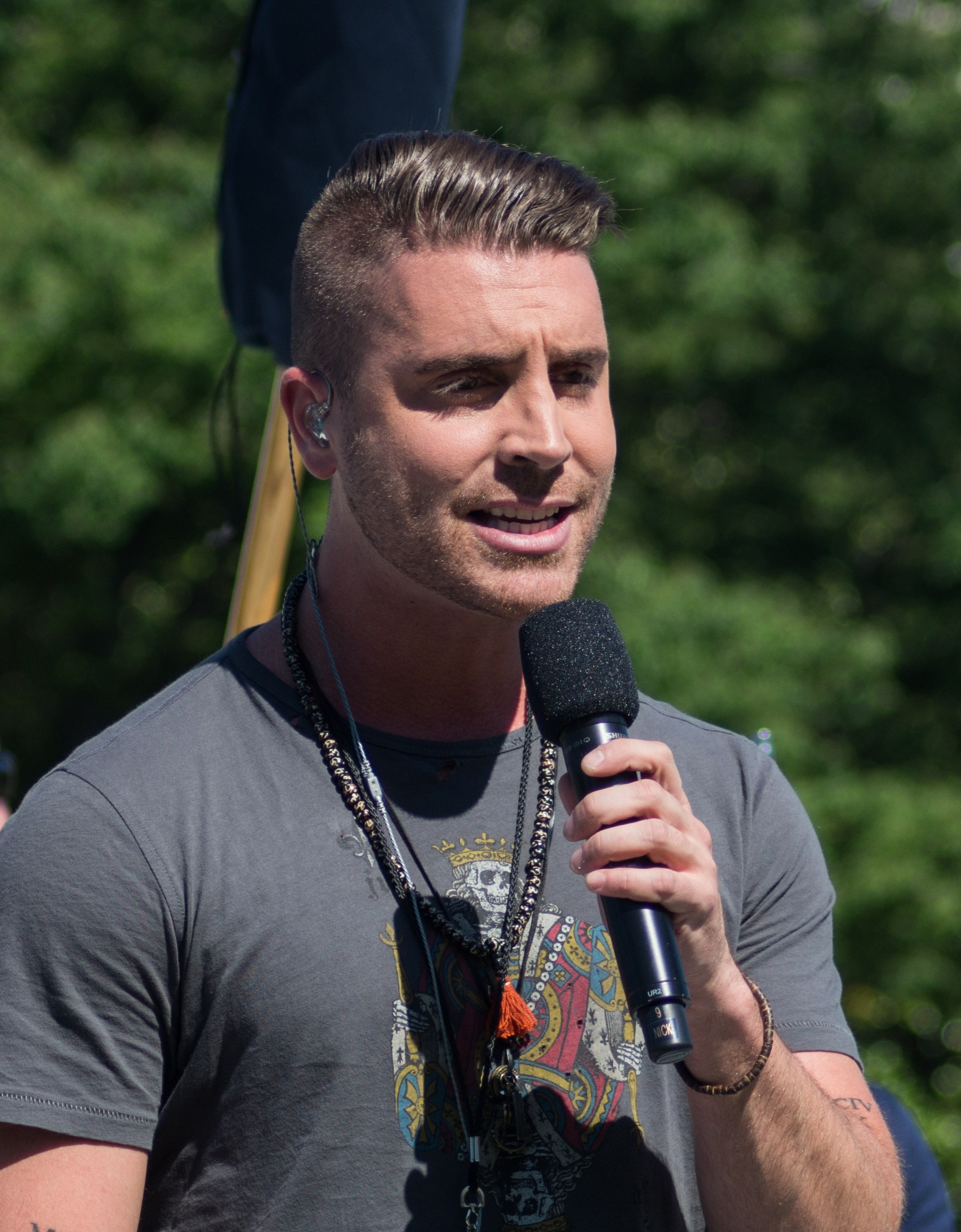
- Fradiani in 2015

Background information
- Born: Nicholas James Fradiani IV; November 15, 1985 (age 40); Guilford, Connecticut, U.S.
- Genres: Pop
- Occupation: Singer
- Years active: 2011–present
- Labels: 19; Big Machine; Republic; Dot
- Formerly of: Beach Avenue

Nicholas James Fradiani IV (born November 15, 1985) is an American singer from Guilford, Connecticut. He rose to regional attention as the lead singer of pop/rock band Beach Avenue when they won the Battle of the Bands at Mohegan Sun in 2011. He gained national recognition in 2014 when he competed on the ninth season of the reality talent show America's Got Talent, although he only made it to "Judgment Week".

In 2015, Fradiani entered as a solo singer on the fourteenth season of American Idol. Fradiani won the show in May 2015, becoming the first winner from the Northeast region. He released an album, Hurricane, with Big Machine Label Group in August 2016. He has subsequently released a six-song EP in fall 2017, as an indie artist and toured with The Alternate Routes.

Fradiani played the role of Neil Diamond-Then in the musical A Beautiful Noise, both on Broadway (2023-2024) and in the North American Tour (2024-2026)

== Early life and education ==
Fradiani was born on November 15, 1985, in New Haven, Connecticut. He is the son of Nick Fradiani III, a musician who, as of 2016, regularly performs at Water's Edge Resort and Spa, as well as in clubs and restaurants, and on cruise ships, and Elizabeth Fradiani (née Maher). He is of three-quarters Italian and one-quarter Irish descent. His father gave his son a drum set when he was two years old, and encouraged him to learn to play piano and later guitar. Fradiani has a sister, Kristen, who was born a day before his sixth birthday on November 14, 1991. Kristen and their paternal cousins Jamie and Nicole attended Southern Connecticut State University. Their paternal cousin, Dean Fradiani Jr., son of the elder Nick's late brother Dean Fradiani Sr., is the owner of Fradiani Landscaping, LLC, in East Haven.

Fradiani graduated from Guilford High School in 2004.

Fradiani has a bachelor's degree in history from Wheaton College, Norton, Massachusetts. He intermittently worked as a substitute teacher at schools while mainly focusing on picking up gigs at local bars wherever he could. He also briefly held a daytime job as a computer software salesman.

== Career ==
=== 2011–2014: Beach Avenue ===
Fradiani rose to regional attention as the lead singer of Milford, Connecticut-based pop/rock band Beach Avenue when they won the Battle of the Bands at Mohegan Sun in 2011. The five-member band released original materials including the Something to Believe In EP in June 2012 and Driving That Road EP in July 2013. In 2014, they released two singles: "Coming Your Way" and "Feel the Beat."

The members of the band are:

- Nick Fradiani, IV – lead vocals and guitar
- Nick Abraham – lead guitar, mandoline, and backing vocals
- Nick Fradiani, III (Fradiani's father) – keyboards and backing vocals
- Jonah Ferrigno – bass
- Ryan Zipp – drums

Three members of the band, Fradiani, Abraham and Zipp, gained national recognition 2014 when they competed on the ninth season of the reality talent show America's Got Talent, singing their original song "Coming Your Way". Fradiani cites singing the original song on the show as his "biggest career break". The audition was aired on NBC in July 2014, and the song reached No. 53 on the iTunes Pop Singles Chart; it sold 6,000 copies in the first week after the televised audition. All four judges voted "yes" for the band to go to the next round. The band made it to "Judgement Week", broadcast on July 22 and 23, where they played another of their original songs titled "Feel the Beat" before elimination from the competition. "Coming Your Way" remained in the Top 200 for over two weeks, selling more than 10,000 copies.

=== 2015: American Idol ===
Fradiani auditioned in New York City and his golden ticket song was Peter Gabriel's "In Your Eyes". During Hollywood Week, he sang "Babylon" by David Gray. He sang Train's "Drops of Jupiter (Tell Me)" during the House of Blues Showcase, earning his spot in the Top 24. He was announced as the winner on May 13, 2015, with Clark Beckham finishing as runner-up. Fradiani's winning song was "Beautiful Life", recorded on Big Machine label. "Beautiful Life" was the FIFA 2015 Women's World Cup official anthem. Fradiani headlined the American Idols LIVE! Tour 2015, a thirty-seven city tour over eight weeks featuring the top five contestants.

==== Performances ====
American Idol season 14 performances and results
Week	Theme	Song(s)	Original artist(s)	Result
Auditions	Contestant's choice	"In Your Eyes"	Peter Gabriel	Advanced
Hollywood Week	Group round	"Rude"	Magic!	Advanced
Hollywood Week	Solo round	"Babylon"	David Gray	Advanced
House of Blues (Top 48)	Contestant's choice	"Drops of Jupiter (Tell Me)"	Train	Advanced
Top 24	Contestant's choice	"Thinking Out Loud"	Ed Sheeran	Safe
Top 16	Music of Motown	"Signed, Sealed, Delivered I'm Yours"	Stevie Wonder	Safe
Top 12	"Back to the Start"	"In Your Eyes"	Peter Gabriel	Safe
Top 11 (first week)	"Get the Party Started"	"Wake Me Up"	Avicii	Safe
Top 11 (second week)	Songs from the Movies	"Danger Zone" from Top Gun	Kenny Loggins	Safe
Top 9	Songs from the 1980s	"Man in the Mirror"	Michael Jackson	Safe
Top 8	Kelly Clarkson	"Catch My Breath"	Kelly Clarkson	Safe
Top 7	Billboard Hot 100	"Teenage Dream"	Katy Perry	Safe
Top 6	"American classics" as deemed by viewers	"American Girl" "Only the Good Die Young"	Tom Petty; Billy Joel	Safe
Top 5	"Arena anthems"	"Harder to Breathe" "Maggie May"	Maroon 5 Rod Stewart	Safe
Top 4	Judges' Hometown; Contestant's own soul	"Bright Lights" "What Hurts the Most"	Matchbox Twenty; Mark Wills	Safe
Top 3	Scott Borchetta's Choice; Judges' Choice; Hometown's Choice	"Because the Night" "Back Home" "I'll Be"	Patti Smith; Andy Grammer; Edwin McCain	Safe
Top 2	Favorite Performance; Simon Fuller's Choice; Winner's Single	"Bright Lights" "I Won't Give Up" "Beautiful Life"	Matchbox Twenty; Jason Mraz; Nick Fradiani	Winner
Finale	Encore with original artist	"Back Home" "Honey, I'm Good."	Andy Grammer	Winner

=== 2015–2017: Hurricane ===
Following Fradiani's Idol win, his label offered a non-target PledgeMusic campaign for pre-orders and merchandise sales. During the six weeks before the start of the American Idols LIVE! tour, Fradiani played a number of radio-sponsored concerts, and worked on new songs with writers including Paul Doucette. In September, following the end of the tour, work on the new album intensified, although Fradiani also played shows including Live in the Vineyard and Connecticut's All-Star Christmas, where Rob Thomas invited Fradiani to join him in singing "Bright Lights." Fradiani was also one of the American Idol alumni who represented the show at the winter Television Critics Association panel.

On February 12, 2016, Fradiani appeared on American Idol to mentor and duet with Top 24 contestants Thomas Stringfellow and Gianna Isabella. As part of the mentoring packaging with Isabella, the show aired a brief clip of Fradiani's upcoming single, "Get You Home," which he co-wrote with Nolan Sipe, Jaden Michaels, and Rykeyz; it was mixed by Grammy winner Serban Ghenea. The same night, Fradiani shared a longer excerpt, which included a sample of Young MC's "Busta Move." In an interview with Ralphie Aversa during Backstage at the Grammys, Fradiani described "Get You Home" as "the most up-tempo, funkiest song on the whole album." In multiple interviews, he mentioned that he co-wrote every song on the album, for which recording was completed in early February.

In a live Facebook chat on February 24, Fradiani revealed that "Get You Home" would be released on March 11, 2016. As a treat for fans, the release date was shifted to March 10, which coincided with the debut live performance on American Idol. A video was shot on March 29 in Chicago, at Virgin Hotels Chicago, with model Michelle Hicks as the female lead. It was directed by Erik White and used real hotel guests as extras. Released on May 19, 2016, the video shows Fradiani having a "cat and mouse game" encounter, starting at the hotel's bar, with a beautiful woman who appears to have no scruples, leading to a steamy night at the hotel and a surprise resolution.

In an interview with Boston's Mix 104.1 on May 5, 2016, Fradiani revealed the album's title of Hurricane, to be released on August 5, 2016, named after a track co-written with Jason Mraz and with Fradiani's Beach Avenue guitarist, Nick Abraham. Fradiani and Abraham gave the first performance of "Hurricane" (acoustic) at the B93 Big Summer Show in Modesto, California, on June 10, 2016.

Starting in late May 2016, Fradiani also released snippets of the recorded versions of various songs from the album, sometimes accompanied by "behind the songs" videos. The album Hurricane was released on August 5, 2016, and debuted at No. 1 on Billboard's Heatseekers chart.

A second single, "All On You," was released on August 5, 2016. On December 15, Billboard provided the exclusive premiere of a stark, black-and-white performance video for the song, shot at New Haven's historic Lyric Hall by Ryan Zipp. In the same feature, Fradiani confirmed that the next single would be "Love Is Blind," to be released in January 2017, with a video to follow around Valentine's Day.

In January 2017, Fradiani parted with Big Machine Label Group and 19 Entertainment. The official video for "Love Is Blind" was released on January 23, 2017. It shows Fradiani surprising a bride and groom by performing the song for their first dance together as a married couple.

=== 2017–2019: Where We Left Off ===
After parting ways with Big Machine, Fradiani began work on a new EP, Where We Left Off, which was released on October 13, 2017. A return to a more organic style, the six-song EP was written entirely with Beach Avenue lead guitarist Nick Abraham. Two additional Connecticut singer-songwriters, Stephen Kellogg and Coley O'Toole, also collaborated on the tracks "I'll Wait for You" and "Run Away," respectively. Of making the EP, Fradiani said: " I wrote everything, co-produced everything, and I think you can really hear me in the music, it's a little more organic sounding. We tried to use a lot of real stringed instruments and played everything, and it was a cool experience."

The lead single for the EP was "I'll Wait for You," of which Pop, Rinse, Repeat said: "If you're not tapping your foot along with him by about 12 seconds, I don't know if there's hope for you in the happiness department." On May 4, 2018, Fradiani released an acoustic version of the EP's third track, "Scared," rearranged with Eric Donnelly from The Alternate Routes. Fradiani had co-headlined a tour with The Alternate Routes during the summer and fall of 2017. In October 2019, Fradiani portrayed Lorenzo Anello in the national tour of A Bronx Tale.

=== 2022-present: A Beautiful Noise ===
In June 2022, Fradiani portrayed Neil Diamond – Then, in the pre-Broadway tryout of A Beautiful Noise as the alternate. In November 2022, the show moved to Broadway at the Broadhurst Theater. Fradiani initially performed on Wednesday evenings, as well as filling in when Will Swenson was out sick. On October 31, 2023, Fradiani took over the role full-time, doing all eight shows a week. The show closed on Broadway on June 30, 2024.

The North American tour of the show opened on September 21, 2024 at the Providence Performing Arts Center in Providence, RI, with Fradiani continuing in the lead role of Neil Diamond-Then. During the tour, he celebrated his 1,000th show as Neil Diamond. The final show of the tour will be on July 12, 2026.

== Discography ==
=== Studio albums ===
Solo

List of albums, with selected chart positions, sales, and certifications
Title	Album details	Peak chart positions		Sales
Title	Album details	US	US Heat	Sales
Hurricane	Released: August 5, 2016; Label: 19, Big Machine, Republic, Dot; Format: CD, digital download	121	1	US: 5,000
Past My Past	Released: November 25, 2022			

=== EPs ===
As solo artist

Title and details
Where We Left Off
- Type: EP
- Released: October 13, 2017
- Label: Nick Fradiani
Track listing

No.	Title	Length
1.	"I'll Wait for You"	3:51
2.	"Run Away"	3:01
3.	"Scared"	4:13
4.	"We Live Forever"	3:08
5.	"Outlaws"	3:07
6.	"I Can't Be"	3:54

As part of Beach Avenue

Title and details	Track listing
Something to Believe In: Type: EP; Released: June 16, 2012; Label:Beach Avenue	No. / Title / Length; 1. / "Believe" / 3:13; 2. / "Run" / 3:35; 3. / "Keep On Holding" / 3:38; 4. / "Interlude" / 0:30; 5. / "Can't Get Enough" / 3:36; 6. / "Come Home" / 3:50
Driving That Road: Type: EP; Released: July 11, 2013; Label: Beach Avenue	No. / Title / Length; 1. / "Take Me Home" / 2:55; 2. / "Dangerous" (feat. David Miller) / 2:55; 3. / "Freight Train" / 2:53; 4. / "Songman" / 4:28; 5. / "Driving That Road" / 3:27
A Very Merry Beach Avenue Christmas EP: Type: EP; Released: December 1, 2014; Label: Beach Avenue	No. / Title / Length; 1. / "Merry Little Christmas" / 3:08; 2. / "Little Drummer Boy" / 3:00; 3. / "White Christmas" / 2:44

=== Singles ===
==== Beach Avenue ====
Year	Title	Notes
2013	"Songman"	
2014	"Coming Your Way"	Sales US: 6,000; Song performed during America's Got Talent
2014	"Feel the Beat"	
2014	"Centuries"	Acoustic cover, originally performed by Fall Out Boy.
2018	"King and Queen"	

==== Solo ====
Year	Title	Peak chart positions					Sales	Album
Year	Title	US	US Pop	US Adult Pop	US Digital	CAN Digital	Sales	Album
2011	"Billboard"	—	—	—	—	—		Non-album single
2011	"Call Me Back (RoMayo)"	—	—	—	—	—		Non-album single
2015	"Beautiful Life"	93	39	24	22	48	US: 50,000	Hurricane
2016	"Get You Home"	—	—	32	—	—		Hurricane
2016	"All on You"	—	29	34	—	—		Hurricane
2017	"I'll Wait for You"	—	—	—	—	—		Where We Left Off
2017	"Hallelujah" (with Nick Fradiani Sr.)	—	—	—	—	—		Non-album single
2018	"Scared" (acoustic)	—	—	—	—	—		Non-album single

=== Other songs ===
- 2013: "Father and Son" (Nick Fradiani Sr. featuring Nick Fradiani Jr.)
- 2016: "Hallelujah" (Nick Fradiani Jr. featuring Nick Fradiani Sr.)

== See also ==
- List of Idols winners
