= Beautiful Life (Nick Fradiani song) =

Single by Nick Fradiani

from the album Hurricane
- Released: May 12, 2015
- Recorded: 2015
- Genre: Pop rock
- Length: 3:28
- Label: Big Machine Records, 19
- Songwriters: Chris Carrabba, Rykeyz, Ayanna Elese
- Producer: Julian Raymond

Nick Fradiani singles chronology
"Beautiful Life" (2015)	"Get You Home" (2016)

Music video
- "Beautiful Life" on YouTube

Music video
- "Beautiful Life" (FIFA Women's World Cup 2015) on YouTube

"Beautiful Life" is a song performed by Nick Fradiani. It was released as his debut single after he won the fourteenth season of the reality competition American Idol. The song was written by Chris Carrabba, Rykeyz, Ayanna Elese.

== Background ==
The song was written by Chris Carrabba of the rock band Dashboard Confessional together with his friends Rykeyz and Ayanna Elese. According to Carrabba, the song was written in "a little bit of a vacuum," and how it came to be submitted to Idol was "still a blur" to him. It was given to Fradiani as his coronation song. Fradiani first heard the song the day after making Idol's top three and recognized Chris Carrabba's voice who he said he was a fan of since high school. Fradiani described the single as "fun. meets the Goo Goo Dolls meets me" and he was happy how it came out. Scott Borchetta, the mentor on the show, thought that the song won Fradiani the competition. The song was released for sale after Fradiani performed the song in the final two performance night on May 12, 2015.

Fox, who broadcast American Idol, used "Beautiful Life" as its official promotional song for its coverage of the 2015 FIFA Women's World Cup.

== Commercial performance ==
The song debuted on the Billboard Hot 100 at No. 93, selling 50,000 copies in its first week. The song also debuted on the US Digital Songs chart at No. 22, and the Hot Canadian Digital Song chart at No. 48.

== Music video ==
A promotional music video featuring footage of the United States women's national soccer team was released by Fox in May 2015, advertising Fox Sports' coverage of the Women's World Cup.

The official music video was released on July 23, 2015. Directed by Shane Drake, the video was shot in Nashville in a single night. "In the video, Fradiani hangs out with friends on what is his last evening before setting out to make his musical dreams come true. The group sneaks past a fence and hangs out in an abandoned building, gets pizza at a local parlor, and caps off the night with beers before saying heartfelt goodbyes."

== Charts ==
Chart (2015)	Peak position
Canada (Hot Canadian Digital Songs)	48
US Billboard Hot 100	93
US Adult Pop Airplay (Billboard)	24
US Pop Airplay (Billboard)	39
