= American Idol season 14 =

American Idol
- Season 14
- Hosted by: Ryan Seacrest
- Judges: Harry Connick Jr.; Jennifer Lopez; Keith Urban
- Winner: Nick Fradiani
- Runner-up: Clark Beckham
- Finals venue: Dolby Theatre
- Mentor: Scott Borchetta

Release
- Original network: Fox
- Original release: January 7 – May 13, 2015

Season chronology
- ← Previous; Season 13 Next → Season 15

The fourteenth season of American Idol, also known as American Idol XIV, premiered on the Fox television network on January 7, 2015. Ryan Seacrest returned as host, while Harry Connick Jr., Jennifer Lopez, and Keith Urban returned as judges. Randy Jackson departed as the in-house mentor and was replaced by Scott Borchetta. Long-time sponsor Coca-Cola ended its relationship with the show.

Before the finale, it was announced that the fifteenth season would be the last of the reality show. Since the series began in 2002, it peaked in viewership at 30 million viewers per episode in 2006, declining to 20 million viewers per episode in 2011, and down further since with an average of about 9.15 million viewers per episode in 2015.

On May 13, Nick Fradiani was announced as this season's winner, with Clark Beckham as the runner-up.

== Changes from previous seasons ==
The fourteenth season of American Idol featured a number of changes to its format. Former judge Randy Jackson, who had served as a mentor on the previous season, left the show and was succeeded by Big Machine Records founder Scott Borchetta. In May 2014, Ryan Seacrest signed a two-year extension to remain as host through 2016, which would be the show's final season. Long-time sponsor Coca-Cola ended its relationship with the series, and the Ford Motor Company maintained a reduced role.

To evaluate their ability to perform in front of a live audience, the final 48 contestants participated in a private concert at the House of Blues in West Hollywood before being cut to 24. Separate results shows during the top 12 rounds were discontinued in favor of a single two-hour broadcast on Wednesday nights, where the results from the previous week were revealed, similarly to So You Think You Can Dance and Dancing with the Stars.

A new feature was also introduced, where viewers could vote via Twitter to decide which of the bottom two singers from the previous week would advance. Beginning with the top 9, the two contestants who received the lowest votes the previous week were revealed. The bottom two contestants then performed in exactly the same format as the safe contestants. However, after the performances were completed, the viewers only had five minutes to vote by Twitter; the contestant with the higher vote count would be safe and the other contestant would be eliminated.

The finale returned to the Dolby Theatre, where five of the first six-season finales took place.

== Regional auditions ==
The American Idol "Audition Bus Tour" visited the following cities: Portland, Oregon; Portland, Maine; Reno, Nevada; Columbus, Ohio; Richmond, Virginia; Albuquerque, New Mexico; Amarillo, Texas; Myrtle Beach, South Carolina; Branson, Missouri; Tallahassee, Florida; and Kansas City, Missouri.

Auditions took place in these cities:

American Idol (season 14) – regional auditions
City	Preliminary date	Preliminary venue	Filming date(s)	Filming venue
Minneapolis, Minnesota	June 18, 2014	Mariucci Arena	September 24–25, 2014	Minneapolis Convention Center
New Orleans, Louisiana	June 25, 2014	Lakefront Arena	August 26–27, 2014	Morial Convention Center
Various cities	July 9–21, 2014	Varied	August 13–14, 2014	Bartle Hall Convention Center (Kansas City)
Uniondale, New York	July 23, 2014	Nassau Veterans Memorial Coliseum	September 16–17, 2014	Marriott Hotel (Brooklyn) (Note: Adam Lambert filled in for Keith Urban, who was with his wife, Nicole Kidman, after the death of her father.)
Nashville, Tennessee	July 30, 2014	Nashville Municipal Auditorium	August 3–4, 2014	Music City Center
San Francisco, California	September 29, 2014	Cow Palace	October 3–4, 2014	Westin St. Francis

== Hollywood week ==
Hollywood week aired in four parts over two weeks. Contestants participated in three rounds: lines of ten, groups and solos. The judges also asked some of the most notable contestants to sing for them at the beginning of the rounds, surprising many of them, but they all advanced. After Hollywood Week, contestants performed in the Showcase round in front of a live audience at the House of Blues in Los Angeles.

== Semifinals ==
The semifinals began on February 25, 2015, and were filmed at The Fillmore in Detroit. After the top 10 finalists were determined by the public vote, the judges chose two additional contestants to advance to the finals as Wild Card picks.

Color key:

This contestant was chosen by the public to advance.
This contestant was not chosen by the public, but was chosen by the judges as a Wild Card pick.
This contestant was eliminated.

=== Top 24 ===
Contestants are listed in the order they performed.

Male contestants (February 25)
Contestant	Song	Result
Adam Ezegelian	"I Wanna Rock"	Advanced
Michael Simeon	"How Am I Supposed to Live Without You"	Eliminated
Savion Wright	"Hey, Soul Sister"	Eliminated
Mark Andrew	"The Weight"	Advanced
Trevor Douglas	"Best I Ever Had"	Eliminated
Clark Beckham	"When a Man Loves a Woman"	Advanced
Rayvon Owen	"Jealous"	Advanced
Daniel Seavey	"I'm Yours"	Advanced
Riley Bria	"Homeboy"	Eliminated
Quentin Alexander	"I Put a Spell on You"	Advanced
Nick Fradiani	"Thinking Out Loud"	Advanced
Qaasim Middleton	"Uptown Funk"	Advanced

Female contestants (February 26)
Contestant	Song	Result
Lovey James	"Love Runs Out"	Eliminated
Adanna Duru	"Rather Be"	Advanced
Alexis Gomez	"Gunpowder & Lead"	Advanced
Joey Cook	"Somebody Like You"	Advanced
Katherine Winston	"Safe & Sound"	Eliminated
Shannon Berthiaume	"Who Knew"	Eliminated
Loren Lott	"Note to God"	Advanced
Shi Scott	"Umbrella"	Eliminated
Maddie Walker	"Love Gets Me Everytime"	Advanced
Sarina-Joi Crowe	"Mamma Knows Best"	Advanced
JAX	"Bang Bang (My Baby Shot Me Down)"	Advanced
Tyanna Jones	"Lips Are Movin"	Advanced

=== Top 16 – Motown ===
Contestants are listed in the order they performed.

Male contestants (March 4)
Contestant	Song	Result
Daniel Seavey	"How Sweet It Is (To Be Loved By You)"	Advanced
Mark Andrew	"Papa Was a Rollin' Stone"	Eliminated
Rayvon Owen	"My Girl"	Advanced
Adam Ezegelian	"I Want You Back"	Eliminated
Clark Beckham	"The Tracks of My Tears"	Advanced
Nick Fradiani	"Signed, Sealed, Delivered I'm Yours"	Advanced
Qaasim Middleton	"I Wish"	Advanced
Quentin Alexander	"Master Blaster (Jammin')"	Advanced

Female contestants (March 5)
Contestant	Song	Result
Tyanna Jones	"Rockin' Robin"	Advanced
Loren Lott	"I Wanna Be Where You Are"	Eliminated
Maddie Walker	"I'll Be There"	Advanced
Joey Cook	"Shop Around"	Advanced
Sarina-Joi Crowe	"You've Really Got a Hold on Me"	Advanced
Adanna Duru	"Hello"	Advanced
JAX	"Ain't No Mountain High Enough"	Advanced
Alexis Gomez	"I Can't Help Myself (Sugar Pie Honey Bunch)"	Eliminated

Non-competition performance
Performers	Song
Aretha Franklin	"I Will Survive"

== Top 12 contestants ==
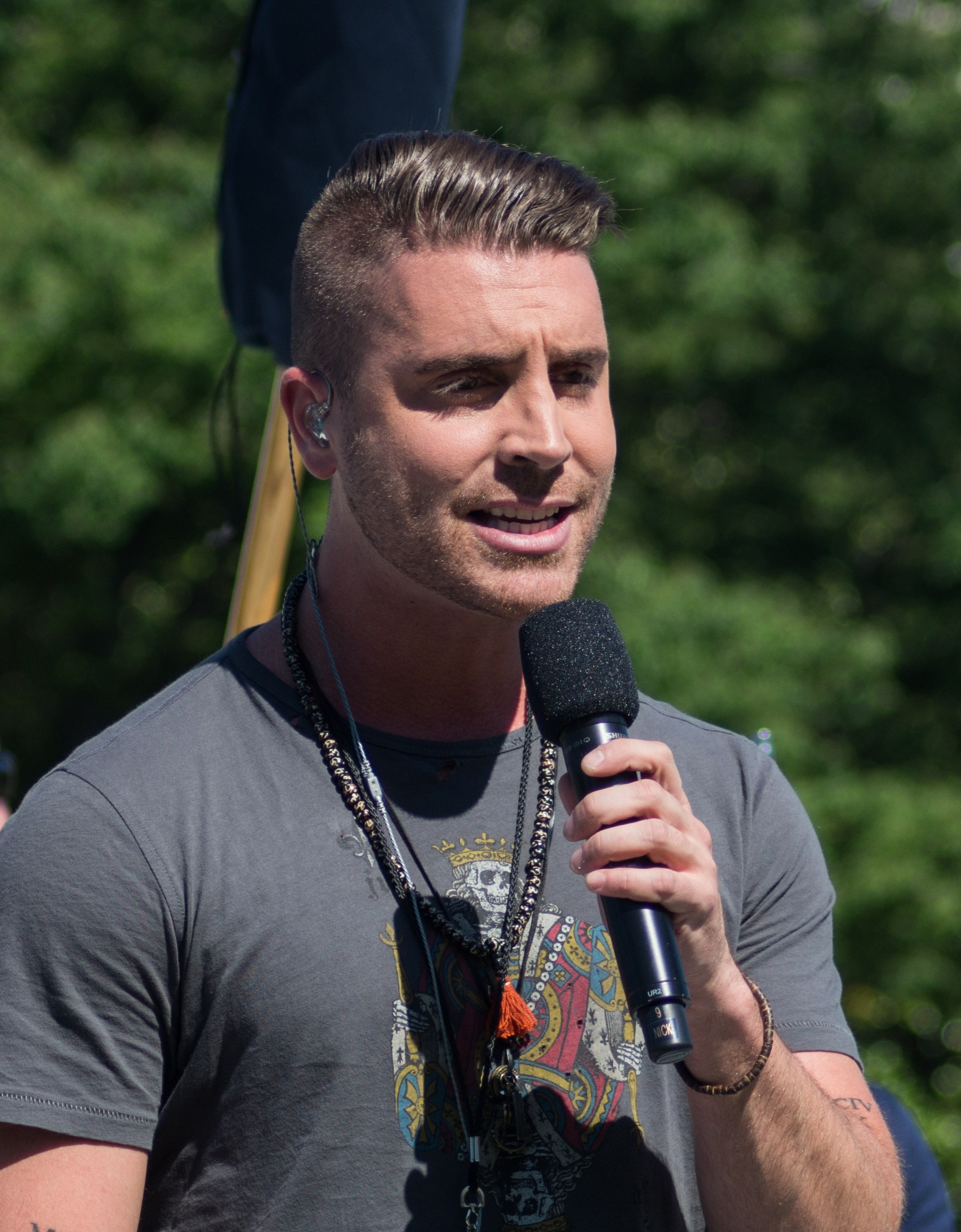
Nick Fradiani

- Nick Fradiani (born November 15, 1985) was from Guilford, Connecticut. He and his girlfriend auditioned in New York City, and his golden ticket song was Peter Gabriel's "In Your Eyes." In Hollywood, he sang "Babylon" by David Gray. He sang Train's "Drops of Jupiter (Tell Me)" during the House of Blues Showcase, earning his spot in the top 24.
- Clark Beckham (born May 15, 1992) was from White House, Tennessee. Beckham sang James Brown's "It's a Man's World" during his audition. In his first solo performance in Hollywood, he sang Otis Reding's "Try a Little Tenderness". He advanced to the top 24 after he sang "Georgia on My Mind" by Ray Charles in the House of Blues Showcase.
- JAX (born May 5, 1996) was from East Brunswick, New Jersey. She auditioned in New York City with her rendition of the Beatles' "I Want to Hold Your Hand". She also sang "Toxic" by Britney Spears during her first solo in Hollywood. For her final solo, she sang the Beatles' "Let it Be". She earned her spot in the Top 24 in the House of Blues Showcase after she performed Lady Gaga's "You & I."
- Rayvon Owen (born June 27, 1991) was a vocal coach from Richmond, Virginia. He auditioned in San Francisco with his rendition of Katy Perry's "Wide Awake." He sang "Ordinary People" by John Legend as his first solo and Otis Reding's "Try a Little Tenderness" as his final solo in Hollywood. He performed Sam Smith's "Lay Me Down" in the House of Blues Showcase, earning his spot in the semifinals.
- Tyanna Jones (born August 8, 1998) was from Jacksonville, Florida. For her audition, she sang "Wings" by Little Mix. In Hollywood, she sang Olly Murs' "Dance with Me Tonight" as her first solo and "Try" by Colbie Caillat as her final solo. She performed Beyoncé's "Love on Top" in the House of Blues Showcase, earning her spot in the semifinals.
- Quentin Alexander (born December 11, 1994) was from New Orleans, Louisiana. He auditioned in New Orleans with "Royals" by Lorde. In Hollywood, he sang "Riptide" by Vance Joy. He sang "Youth" by Foxes in the House of Blues Showcase, earning his spot in the semifinals.
- Joey Cook (born March 30, 1991) was originally from Woodbridge, Virginia, but had moved to New Orleans, Louisiana, where she auditioned with "King of Spain" by The Tallest Man on Earth. She sang Miranda Lambert's "Kerosene" as her first solo and "Across the Universe" by the Beatles as her final solo in Hollywood. She earned her spot in the top 24 after she performed "Sweet Pea" by Amos Lee in the House of Blues Showcase. Her performance of Fancy during the top 11 was well-received by the judges and earned a standing ovation from Keith Urban. She played the accordion, ukulele, banjo, and the mandolin during the course of the season.
- Qaasim Middleton (born January 13, 1996) was from Brooklyn, New York. He auditioned in New York City with "Sir Duke" by Stevie Wonder. He performed Ed Sheeran's "Give Me Love" as his final solo in Hollywood. He sang "Satisfaction" by Allen Stone, earning his spot in the top 24 in the House of Blues Showcase.
- Daniel Seavey (born April 2, 1999) was from Vancouver, Washington. He sang Leonard Cohen's "Hallelujah" and Paula Abdul's "Straight Up" during his audition in San Francisco. In Hollywood, he sang Ed Sheeran's "Thinking Out Loud" as his first solo and Sheeran's "I See Fire" as his final solo in Hollywood. He performed "Straight Up" again in the House of Blues Showcase, earning his spot in the top 24.
- Adanna Duru (born October 10, 1996) was from Diamond Bar, California. She auditioned in San Francisco with Lady Gaga's "You & I." She performed "It's a Man's, Man's, Man's World" by James Brown during the House of Blues Showcase, where she got standing ovation by Jennifer Lopez and earned her spot in the Top 24.
- Maddie Walker (born December 23, 1997) was from Ankeny, Iowa. She had previously auditioned in the thirteenth season, but was cut during the group round in Hollywood. She auditioned again in New York City with Gwen Sebastian's "Suitcase." She sang "Already Gone" by Sugarland as her first solo in Hollywood, and "Don't Ya" by Brett Eldredge as her final solo. During the House of Blues Showcase, she sang "Big Girls Don't Cry" by Fergie. She was cut during the top 24 selection, but was called back by the judges, and subsequently earned a spot in the semifinals.
- Sarina-Joi Crowe (born June 27, 1995) was from Columbia, Tennessee. She had originally auditioned in the tenth season, but was cut on the last day in Hollywood. She had also auditioned in the twelfth and thirteenth seasons, where she was again cut. For her fourth appearance, she auditioned in Nashville with "Love Runs Out" by OneRepublic. She sang Jessie J's "Big White Room" in the House of Blues Showcase, where she earned her spot in the top 24.

== Finals ==
There were eleven weeks of finals with twelve contestants competing. At least one contestant was eliminated every week based on the public's votes, although the judges could veto one elimination through the use of the "judges' save."

Color key:

This contestant was saved by America's vote.
This contestant was in the bottom two or three, but was saved by America's vote.
This contestant was saved from elimination by the judges.
This contestant was in the bottom two, but was saved from elimination by voters on Twitter.
This contestant was eliminated.
This contestant won American Idol.
This contestant was the runner-up.

=== Top 12 – Back to the start ===
Contestants performed the songs they originally sang at their auditions, and are listed in the order they performed.

Contestant	Song	Result
Sarina-Joi Crowe	"Love Runs Out"	Eliminated
Rayvon Owen	"Wide Awake"	Safe
Daniel Seavey	"Straight Up"	Safe
Maddie Walker	"Suitcase"	Safe
Tyanna Jones	"Wings"	Safe
Nick Fradiani	"In Your Eyes"	Safe
JAX	"I Want to Hold Your Hand"	Safe
Qaasim Middleton	"Sir Duke"	Safe
Clark Beckham	"It's a Man's Man's Man's World"	Safe
Joey Cook	"King of Spain"	Safe
Quentin Alexander (Note: The judges selected Alexander and Duru to complete the Top 12 at the end of the show.)	"Royals"	Safe
Adanna Duru	"You and I"	Safe

=== Top 11 (March 19) – Party songs ===
Contestants are listed in the order they performed. Sarina-Joi Crowe performed "Neon Lights," but the judges chose to not save her, resulting in her elimination. The judges did, however, choose to use their "judges' save" the following week when Qaasim Middleton was announced as the performer to be eliminated.

Contestant	Song	Result
Rayvon Owen	"Burn"	Safe
Maddie Walker	"She's Country"	Safe
Joey Cook	"Fancy"	Safe
Clark Beckham	"Takin' It to the Streets"	Safe
JAX	"Blank Space"	Safe
Qaasim Middleton	"Jet"	Saved by the judges
Adanna Duru	"Runaway Baby"	Safe
Tyanna Jones	"Tightrope"	Safe
Daniel Seavey	"Happy"	Safe
Quentin Alexander	"Rolling in the Deep"	Safe
Nick Fradiani	"Wake Me Up"	Safe

Non-competition performance
Performers	Song
Jussie Smollett & Yazz	"No Apologies"

=== Top 11 (March 26) – Movie soundtracks ===
Nile Rodgers served as a guest mentor this week. Contestants chose songs featured in movies, and are listed in the order they performed.

Contestant	Song	Film	Result
Adanna Duru	"Love You I Do"	Dreamgirls	Eliminated
Daniel Seavey	"Lost Stars"	Begin Again	Safe
Rayvon Owen	"Stayin' Alive"	Saturday Night Fever	Bottom three
Nick Fradiani	"Danger Zone"	Top Gun	Safe
Joey Cook	"Mad World"	Donnie Darko	Safe
Tyanna Jones	"Circle of Life"	The Lion King	Safe
Quentin Alexander	"You're the One That I Want"	Grease	Safe
Maddie Walker	"Let's Hear It for the Boy"	Footloose	Eliminated
Clark Beckham	"Sunday Morning"	Cheaper by the Dozen 2	Safe
JAX	"Grow Old with You"	The Wedding Singer	Safe
Qaasim Middleton	"Come Together"	Across the Universe	Safe

Non-competition performance
Performers	Song
Top 11	"Get Lucky"
Jennifer Lopez	"Feel the Light"
Kenny Loggins	"Footloose"

=== Top 9 – Music from the 1980s ===
Boy George served as a guest mentor this week. Contestants are listed in the order they performed.

Beginning the following week, viewers could vote via Twitter to determine which of the bottom two contestants would be eliminated and which would be saved.

Contestant	Song	Result
Daniel Seavey	"You Make My Dreams"	Eliminated
Quentin Alexander	"In the Air Tonight"	Safe
Joey Cook	"Girls Just Want to Have Fun"	Safe
Tyanna Jones	"I Wanna Dance with Somebody (Who Loves Me)"	Safe
JAX	"You Give Love a Bad Name"	Safe
Nick Fradiani	"Man in the Mirror"	Safe
Clark Beckham	"Every Breath You Take"	Safe
Qaasim Middleton	"Addicted to Love"	Safe
Rayvon Owen	"Everybody Wants to Rule the World"	Twitter save

Non-competition performance
Performers	Song
David Hasselhoff	"Crazy Little Thing Called Love" "Walking on Sunshine" "Never Gonna Give You Up" "Do You Really Want to Hurt Me" "Let's Dance" "I Love Rock 'n' Roll"
Top 11 with Boy George	"Karma Chameleon"
Salt-N-Pepa	"Push It"

=== Top 8 – Kelly Clarkson ===
Kelly Clarkson was a guest mentor this week. Contestants performed one song each from her discography, and are listed in the order they performed.

Daniel Seavey performed "Breakaway," but he lost the Twitter vote and was eliminated.

Contestant	Kelly Clarkson song	Result
Nick Fradiani	"Catch My Breath"	Safe
JAX	"Beautiful Disaster"	Safe
Tyanna Jones	"Mr. Know It All"	Safe
Joey Cook	"Miss Independent"	Safe
Quentin Alexander	"Dark Side"	Safe
Qaasim Middleton	"Stronger (What Doesn't Kill You)"	Eliminated
Clark Beckham	"The Trouble with Love Is"	Safe
Rayvon Owen	"Since U Been Gone"	Twitter save

Non-competition performance
Performers	Song
Top 8	"People Like Us"
Kelly Clarkson	"Heartbeat Song" "At Last"

=== Top 7 – Billboard Hot 100 ===
Jason Derulo and Florida Georgia Line served as guest mentors this week. Contestants performed one song each from the Billboard Hot 100, and are listed in the order they performed.

Qaasim Middleton performed "Hey Ya!," but he lost the Twitter vote and was eliminated.

Contestant	Song	Result
JAX	"Poker Face"	Safe
Nick Fradiani	"Teenage Dream"	Safe
Quentin Alexander	"Latch"	Safe
Joey Cook	"Wrecking Ball"	Eliminated
Clark Beckham	"Make It Rain"	Safe
Tyanna Jones	"Stay"	Safe
Rayvon Owen	"Set Fire to the Rain"	Twitter save

Non-competition performance
Performers	Song
Florida Georgia Line	"Sippin' on Fire"
Jason Derulo	"Want to Want Me"
Iggy Azalea & Jennifer Hudson	"Trouble"

=== Top 6 – American classics ===
Each contestant performed two songs. Contestants are listed in the order they performed. Joey Cook performed "My Funny Valentine" and "Somebody to Love," but she lost the Twitter vote and was eliminated.

Contestant	Order	Song	Result
Tyanna Jones	1	"Why Do Fools Fall in Love"	Safe
Tyanna Jones	8	"Proud Mary"	Safe
Clark Beckham	2	"Superstition"	Safe
Clark Beckham	7	"Moon River"	Safe
JAX	3	"Piece of My Heart"	Safe
JAX	11	"Beat It"	Safe
Nick Fradiani	4	"American Girl"	Safe
Nick Fradiani	9	"Only the Good Die Young"	Safe
Quentin Alexander	5	"Are You Gonna Go My Way"	Eliminated
Quentin Alexander	10	"The Sound of Silence"	Eliminated
Rayvon Owen	6	"Long Train Runnin'"	Twitter save
Rayvon Owen	12	"Always on My Mind"	Twitter save

=== Top 5 – Arena anthems ===
Each contestant performed two songs. Contestants are listed in the order they performed.

Quentin Alexander performed "Light My Fire" and "Shake It Out," but he lost the Twitter vote and was eliminated.

Contestant	Order	Song	Result
JAX	1	"Are You Gonna Be My Girl"	Safe
JAX	9	"White Flag"	Safe
Nick Fradiani	2	"Harder to Breathe"	Safe
Nick Fradiani	6	"Maggie May"	Safe
Clark Beckham	3	"Yesterday"	Safe
Clark Beckham	8	"Boyfriend"	Safe
Tyanna Jones	4	"Party in the U.S.A."	Eliminated
Tyanna Jones	7	"Heaven"	Eliminated
Rayvon Owen	5	"I'm Not the Only One"	Bottom two
Rayvon Owen	10	"Go Your Own Way"	Bottom two

=== Top 4 – Judges' hometowns & one's soul ===
Martina McBride and Jay DeMarcus served as guest mentors this week. Each contestant performed two songs: one representing a judge's hometown, and one representing their own soul. Contestants are listed in the order they performed.

Contestant	Order	Song	Result
Clark Beckham	1	"Living for the City"	Safe
Clark Beckham	5	"Your Man"	Safe
JAX	2	"Empire State of Mind"	Safe
JAX	6	"Human"	Safe
Nick Fradiani	3	"Bright Lights"	Safe
Nick Fradiani	8	"What Hurts the Most"	Safe
Rayvon Owen	4	"Need You Now"	Eliminated
Rayvon Owen	7	"Believe"	Eliminated

Non-competition performance
Performers	Song
Harry Connick Jr.	"City Beneath the Sea"
Martina McBride	"Over the Rainbow"

=== Top 3 ===
Each contestant performed three songs: one chosen by mentor Scott Borchetta, one dedicated to the finalists' hometowns, and one chosen by the judges. Contestants are listed in the order they performed.

Rayvon Owen performed "Want to Want Me", "As", and "You Are So Beautiful"; however, he was revealed to have had the lowest vote count from the previous week and was eliminated.

Contestant	Order	Song	Result
Clark Beckham	1	"Beautiful Day" (Note: Song chosen by Scott Borchetta)	Safe
Clark Beckham	5	"(Sittin' On) the Dock of the Bay"	Safe
Clark Beckham	7	"Earned It"	Safe
Nick Fradiani	2	"Because the Night"	Safe
Nick Fradiani	4	"Back Home"	Safe
Nick Fradiani	9	"I'll Be"	Safe
JAX	3	"My Generation"	Eliminated
JAX	6	"My Immortal"	Eliminated
JAX	8	"Misery Business"	Eliminated

=== Top 2 – Finale ===
Each contestant performed three songs, one of which was chosen by producer Simon Fuller, and are listed in the order they performed. Jax was revealed to have the lowest number of votes from the previous week and was eliminated prior to performing.

Contestant	Order	Song	Result
Clark Beckham	1	"Georgia on My Mind"	Runner-up
Clark Beckham	3	"Ain't No Sunshine" (Note: Song chosen by Simon Fuller)	Runner-up
Clark Beckham	5	"Champion"	Runner-up
Nick Fradiani	2	"Bright Lights"	Winner
Nick Fradiani	4	"I Won't Give Up"	Winner
Nick Fradiani	6	"Beautiful Life"	Winner

Non-competition performance
Performers	Song
Clark Beckham and Nick Fradiani with Fall Out Boy	"Centuries"
Tyanna Jones with The Jacksons	"I Want You Back" "ABC" "The Love You Save" "Shake Your Body (Down to the Ground)"
Sarina-Joi Crowe, Maddie Walker, Adanna Duru, Joey Cook, Tyanna Jones, and Jax with Chic and Nile Rodgers	"We Are Family" "Le Freak" "I'll Be There" "Good Times" "Rapper's Delight"
Ricky Martin	"Mr. Put It Down"
Qaasim Middleton, Quentin Alexander, Rayvon Owen, Clark Beckham, and Nick Fradiani with Ricky Martin	"Livin' la Vida Loca" "She Bangs" "The Cup of Life"
Adanna Duru with Janelle Monáe and Jidenna	"Yoga"
Prince Royce with Jennifer Lopez and Pitbull	"Back It Up"
Joey Cook with Echosmith	"Cool Kids"
Keith Urban	"Even the Stars Fall 4 U"
Rayvon Owen with Jamie Foxx	"In Love by Now"
Daniel Seavey with New Kids on the Block	"Please Don't Go Girl" "Step by Step" "You Got It (The Right Stuff)"
Quentin Alexander with Vance Joy	"Riptide"
Qaasim Middleton with Pitbull and Chris Brown	"Fun"
Steven Tyler	"Love is Your Name"
JAX with Steven Tyler	"Piece of My Heart"
Clark Beckham with Michael McDonald	"Takin' It to the Streets"
Nick Fradiani with Andy Grammer	"Back Home" "Honey, I'm Good"
Harry Connick Jr, Jennifer Lopez and Keith Urban	"Diamonds" "Locked Out of Heaven"
Nick Fradiani	"Beautiful Life"

== Elimination chart ==
Color key:

Winner
Runner-up
Did not perform
Saved by the public
Saved by the judges
Saved by Twitter
Bottom two or three
Eliminated

American Idol (season 14) - Eliminations
Contestant	Pl.	Semifinals			Top 12	Top 11 (Note: Because the judges used their one "judges' save" to save Qaasim Middleton, the top 11 remained intact for another week.)		Top 9	Top 8	Top 7	Top 6	Top 5	Top 4	Top 3	Finale
Contestant	Pl.	3/4	3/5	3/11	3/12	3/19	3/26	4/2	4/9	4/16	4/23	4/30	5/6	5/12	5/13
Nick Fradiani	1	Safe	N/A	Safe	Safe	Safe	Safe	Safe	Safe	Safe	Safe	Safe	Safe	Safe	Winner
Clark Beckham	2	Safe	N/A	Safe	Safe	Safe	Safe	Safe	Safe	Safe	Safe	Safe	Safe	Safe	Runner-up
JAX	3	N/A	Safe	Safe	Safe	Safe	Safe	Safe	Safe	Safe	Safe	Safe	Safe	Eliminated	
Rayvon Owen	4	Safe	N/A	Safe	Safe	Safe	Bottom three	Twitter save	Twitter save	Twitter save	Twitter save	Bottom two	Eliminated		
Tyanna Jones	5	N/A	Safe	Safe	Safe	Safe	Safe	Safe	Safe	Safe	Safe	Eliminated			
Quentin Alexander	6	Safe	N/A	Safe	Safe	Safe	Safe	Safe	Safe	Safe	Eliminated				
Joey Cook	7	N/A	Safe	Safe	Safe	Safe	Safe	Safe	Safe	Eliminated					
Qaasim Middleton	8	Safe	N/A	Safe	Safe	Saved	Safe	Safe	Eliminated						
Daniel Seavey	9	Safe	N/A	Safe	Safe	Safe	Safe	Eliminated							
Adanna Duru	10	N/A	Safe	Safe	Safe	Safe	Eliminated								
Maddie Walker	10	N/A	Safe	Safe	Safe	Safe	Eliminated								
Sarina-Joi Crowe	12	N/A	Safe	Safe	Eliminated										
Mark Andrew		Safe	N/A	Eliminated											
Adam Ezegelian		Safe	N/A	Eliminated											
Alexis Gomez		N/A	Safe	Eliminated											
Loren Lott		N/A	Safe	Eliminated											
Shannon Berthiaume		N/A	Eliminated												
Lovey James		N/A	Eliminated												
Shi Scott		N/A	Eliminated												
Katherine Winston		N/A	Eliminated												
Riley Bria		Eliminated													
Trevor Douglas		Eliminated													
Michael Simeon		Eliminated													
Savion Wright		Eliminated													

== Controversies ==
=== Quentin Alexander incident ===
National media outlets reported on an exchange between judge Harry Connick Jr. and contestant Quentin Alexander, noting that Connick scolding a contestant was awkward. On the live airing of the top 6 show, there were three contestants who had not been saved when Alexander was chosen. After he performed, host Ryan Seacrest noted that he appeared to be upset. When asked, Alexander responded, "This sucks, we've got two of the best vocalists, my best friend [Joey Cook] sitting over there. This whole thing is whack, but I'm going to shut up right now." Seacrest then replied that it was a competition, and with the save anything could happen. After Alexander had left the stage, Connick Jr. said, "Quentin, if it's that whack, then you can always go home, because Idol is paying a lot of money to give you this experience and for you to say that to this hand that is feeding you right now, I think is highly disrespectful." Alexander was then prompted by the producers to return to the stage, where he approached the judges and clarified that he meant the two being potentially eliminated was whack, not the show nor the experience. Later, after performing his second song, he explained, "I understand that these things are going to happen, and I just didn't want my friend to leave" and apologized. Judge Jennifer Lopez empathized with Alexander's emotions running high, but said that as an artist, he would have to learn to work through that even when putting on a performance. Joey Cook commented after being eliminated on Alexander's statements:

I pretty much just told him what he did was beautiful, in my opinion, and it was the perfect representation of him. Quentin is a very emotional person. He’s very 'all cards on the table.' There is no sugar coating. He doesn’t hide his emotions. He’s honest. He’s a raw human being, and I think what happened last night was the perfect example of that and how emotional of a person he is.

The producers played up the exchange in what Music Times termed "what seemed like shady circumstances" to replay the incident throughout the week in show promos and at the beginning of the top 5 show. An Idol source also stated that for fairness purposes, the judges and contestants had a strict wall of silence between them and only interact onstage so Connick Jr. and Alexander have not had contact since last week. Alexander was eliminated the following week with what Music Times questioned as possibly the first time American Idol "went into an episode with what seemed to be a very clear agenda." Yahoo's managing editor Lyndsey Parker detailed many points that she argued was American Idol "throwing Quentin Alexander under the tour bus" referring to the idiom of "throwing [someone] under the bus" by sacrificing a friend as the show heavily promoted the summer tour, which only guaranteed that the top five finalists would be included. Included in her critique was that the show had aired the promotional video featuring the confrontation, which she characterized as "misleadingly edited" to boost ratings. She also wrote:

Throughout the evening, almost all of the contestants were lavishly praised, even though two of them actually messed up, one of them made a questionable lyrical change, and several of them had obvious pitch issues. Quentin’s perfectly solid “Light My Fire” received one of only two negative critiques among the night’s dozen performances, and undeservedly so.

Parker also referenced a "backhanded and unflattering" exchange from Connick Jr. insinuating that Alexander needed to use Auto-Tune for his performance. She also noted that the "fan save" via Twitter was handled uniquely in that contestant Rayvon Owen didn't have a replay or critique until after a commercial break, while Alexander did not get the same treatment, and host Ryan Seacrest claimed Alexander had muttered "I give up," to which Alexander had to clarify that he had actually said, "I give it up." USA Today echoed the sentiment stating that the awkward moments probably led to his elimination.

== Reception ==
=== U.S. Nielsen ratings ===
The season premiere was watched by 11.2 million viewers; down 25% from the thirteenth season's premiere (which had an audience of 15.19 million viewers). However, it was up 6.3% from the thirteenth season's finale (which had an audience of 10.53 million viewers), the second time in the show's history. The most-viewed episode for this season was the "Minneapolis Auditions," which aired on January 21, 2015, and the episode with the fewest viewers tuning in was the "Top 7 Perform: Billboard Hits," which aired on April 8, 2015. This episode now takes the top spot as the least-viewed and worst-rated American Idol episode ever, with 6.58 viewers. The title was previously held by the thirteenth season's "The Final 2," which was watched by 6.76 million viewers on May 20, 2014. The average viewership in millions for the audition episodes was 10.84. The "Top 10 Perform: Movie Night" episode was moved to Thursday night, to make way for the two-hour finale of Empire. There was a two part finale for the season, with the first of two parts airing on Tuesday, May 12, 2015, at 9/8c. The second of the two-part-finale aired on Wednesday, May 13, 2015, at 8/7c.

Episode list
No.	Episode	Air date (2015)	Timeslot (ET)	Rating/Share 18–49	Viewers (millions)	Weekly rank	Source(s)
1	"Nashville Auditions"	January 7	Wednesday 8:00 p.m.	3.2 / 10	11.20	6	
2	"Nashville & Kansas City Auditions"	January 8	Thursday 8:00 p.m.	3.1 / 9	11.23	8	
3	"Kansas City Auditions"	January 14	Wednesday 8:00 p.m.	3.0 / 9	10.87		
4	"Brooklyn Auditions"	January 15	Thursday 8:00 p.m.	2.6 / 8	10.42	10	
5	"Minneapolis Auditions"	January 21	Wednesday 8:00 p.m.	3.4 / 11	11.76	3	
6	"New Orleans Auditions"	January 22	Thursday 8:00 p.m.	2.8 / 9	10.65	7	
7	"San Francisco Auditions"	January 28	Wednesday 8:00 p.m.	2.9/9	11.28	10	
8	"San Francisco Auditions (Continued)"	January 29	Thursday 8:00 p.m.	2.2/7	9.37	17	
9	"Hollywood Week: Part 1"	February 4	Wednesday 8:00 p.m.	3.1/10	11.21	8	
10	"Hollywood Week: Part 2"	February 5	Thursday 8:00 p.m.	2.4/8	9.65	16	
11	"Hollywood Week: Part 3"	February 11	Wednesday 8:00 p.m.	2.8/9	10.66	9	
12	"Hollywood Week: Part 4"	February 12	Thursday 8:00 p.m.	2.3/8	9.62	16	
13	"Showcase Week: Part 1"	February 18	Wednesday 8:00 p.m.	2.8/9	10.70	11	
14	"Showcase Week: Part 2"	February 19	Thursday 8:00 p.m.	2.1/7	8.98	22	
15	"Top 12 Boys Perform"	February 25	Wednesday 8:00 p.m.	2.7/8	10.38	11	
16	"Top 12 Girls Perform"	February 26	Thursday 8:00 p.m.	2.2/7	9.43	16	
17	"Guys Results: Top 8 Guys Perform"	March 4	Wednesday 8:00 p.m.	2.1/7	8.89	19	
18	"Girls Results: Top 8 Girls Perform"	March 5	Thursday 8:00 p.m.	2.2/7	9.41	23	
19	"Top 12 Perform: Back to the Start"	March 11	Wednesday 8:00 p.m.	2.4/7	9.71	17	
20	"Top 11 Perform: Party Songs"	March 12	Thursday 8:00 p.m.	1.8/6	8.32	21	
21	"Top 10 Perform: Movie Night"	March 19	Thursday 8:00 p.m.	1.8/6	8.51	14	
22	"Top 9 Perform: Songs from the 1980s"	March 25	Wednesday 8:00 p.m.	1.7/6	8.46	21	
23	"Top 8 Perform: Kelly Clarkson Night"	April 1	Wednesday 8:00 p.m.	1.8/6	8.48	16	
24	"Top 7 Perform: Billboard Top 100"	April 8	Wednesday 8:00 p.m.	1.4/5	6.58	<25	
25	"Top 6 Perform: American Classics"	April 15	Wednesday 8:00 p.m.	1.4/5	7.63	<25	
26	"Top 5 Perform: Arena Anthems"	April 22	Wednesday 8:00 p.m.	1.5/5	7.47	<25	
27	"Top 4 Perform: Judges' Hometowns & Soul Songs"	April 29	Wednesday 8:00 p.m.	1.6/5	7.36	25	
28	"Top 3 Perform: Judge's Pick, Scott Borchetta's Pick, & Contestant's Hometowns"	May 6	Wednesday 8:00 p.m.	1.4/5	6.93	<25	
29	"Top 2 Perform"	May 12	Tuesday 9:00 p.m.	1.3/4	5.55	<25	
30	"Season 14 Finale"	May 13	Wednesday 8:00 p.m.	1.7/6	8.03	18	

== Music releases ==
- Music releases

== Concert tour ==
The top five finalists performed in the American Idol tour that year.
