= Alexis Gomez (singer) =

American singer-songwriter

Alexis Sarah Elizabeth Gomez is an American singer, musician, and songwriter. She gained popularity as a country singer on American Idol, season 14. Alexis is a graduate of Wright State University in Dayton, Ohio. Her self titled debut album was released in August 2015 from CD Baby.
