= Joey Cook =

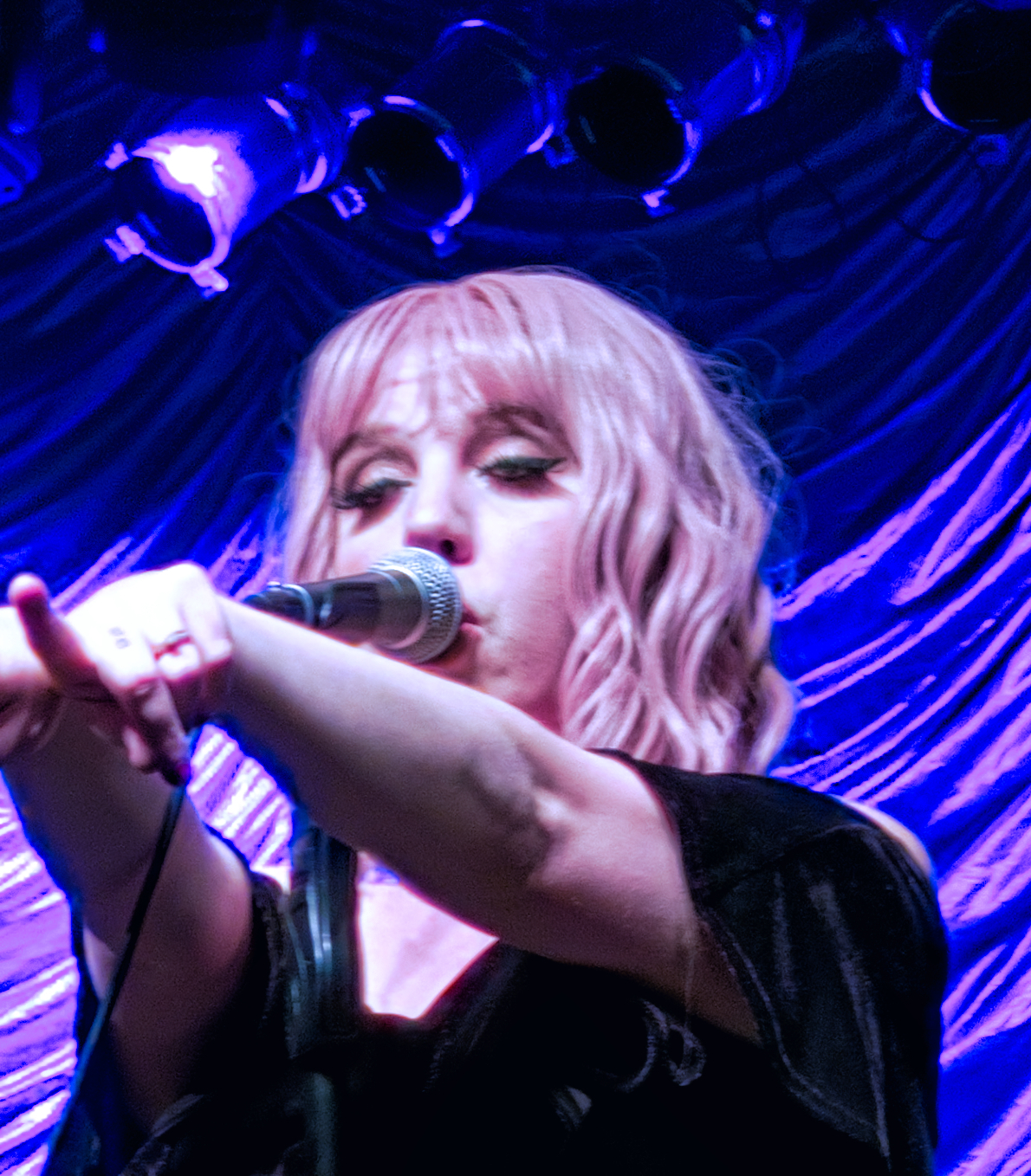
- Joey Cook performing with Postmodern Jukebox in 2019

Background information
- Born: Joey DeAnn Cook; March 30, 1991 (age 35)
- Origin: Woodbridge, Virginia, United States
- Genres: Folk, jazz, indie
- Occupation: Singer-songwriter
- Instruments: Vocals, piano, guitar, accordion, ukulele, banjo, mandolin
- Years active: 2013–present

Joey DeAnn Cook (born March 30, 1991) is an American singer-songwriter from Woodbridge, Virginia who finished seventh place on the fourteenth season of American Idol. She toured with indie rock band Mammoth Indigo in 2013.

== Early life ==
Joey Cook was born on March 30, 1991, and was raised in Woodbridge, Virginia. She began playing piano and singing at the age of five. In high school, she participated in choir and taught herself to play ukulele and guitar. Cook graduated from Woodbridge High School in 2009.

== American Idol ==
Cook auditioned in Kansas City, singing "King of Spain" by The Tallest Man on Earth. She sang "Kerosene" on the first round in Hollywood, and "Across the Universe" in the final solo of the Hollywood Round.

Episode	Theme	Song choice	Original artist	Order	Result
Audition	Auditioner's Choice	"King of Spain"	The Tallest Man on Earth	N/A	Advanced
Hollywood Round, Part 1	A Capella	"Kerosene"	Miranda Lambert	N/A	Advanced
Hollywood Round, Part 2	Group Performance	"To Love Somebody"	The Bee Gees	N/A	Advanced
Hollywood Round, Part 3	Solo	"Across the Universe"	The Beatles	N/A	Advanced
Showcase Week	Personal Choice	"Sweet Pea"	Amos Lee	N/A	Advanced
Top 24	Personal Choice	"Somebody Like You"	Keith Urban	8	Safe
Top 16	Motown	"Shop Around"	The Miracles	8	Safe
Top 12	Back to the Start	"King of Spain"	The Tallest Man on Earth	10	Safe
Top 11	Get the Party Started	"Fancy"	Iggy Azalea feat. Charli XCX	3	Safe
Top 11^{4}	Songs from the Movies	"Mad World"	Tears for Fears	5	Safe
Top 9	'80s Night	"Girls Just Want to Have Fun"	Cyndi Lauper	3	Safe
Top 8	Kelly Clarkson	"Miss Independent"	Kelly Clarkson	4	Safe
Top 7	Billboard Hot 100	"Wrecking Ball"	Miley Cyrus	4	Eliminated
Top 6	American Classics	"My Funny Valentine"	Mitzi Green	N/A	Eliminated
Top 6	American Classics	"Somebody to Love"	Jefferson Airplane	N/A	Eliminated

- ^Note 1 Due to the judges using their one save on Qaasim Middleton, the top 11 remained intact for another week.

== Other works ==
Postmodern Jukebox released "Hey There Delilah" on August 27, 2015, "Sugar, We're Goin Down" on October 1, 2015, "Say My Name" on November 26, 2015, and "Ain't No Rest for the Wicked" on January 7, 2017, with Cook on lead vocals.

Cook's first album, Hey, I Love You, was self-published on Bandcamp in 2012.

Under the name Joey Cook and the Partyraddlers, her album Welcome to the Variety Show was released on July 1, 2016.

== Personal life ==
On March 26, 2015, Cook announced that she was engaged to her long-time boyfriend, Evan Higgins.

== Discography ==
- Hey, I Love You (2012)
- Welcome to the Variety Show (2016)
