= List of American Idol alumni single sales in the United States =

This article gives the single and digital track sales achieved by alumni of American Idol. The songs listed here however include only songs released in their post-Idol career, and does not include coronation songs, live or studio recordings released during the season or straight after the finale, or songs from American Idol season compilation CD. (See American Idol Hot 100 singles for a list of those songs.)

== Total digital track sales ==
These are the total digital download figures in the US for individual Idol alums. Physical single sales, which totaled 4,798,000 units, are not included in this table.

Rank	Artist	Season	Total
1	Carrie Underwood	4 (1st)	72,500,000
2	Kelly Clarkson	1 (1st)	35,173,000^{c}
3	Daughtry	5 (4th)	13,720,000^{c}
4	Gabby Barrett	16 (3rd)	12,000,000
5	Jordin Sparks	6 (1st)	10,585,000^{c}
6	Phillip Phillips	11 (1st)	7,472,000^{c}
7	Adam Lambert	8 (2nd)	5,235,000^{c}
8	David Cook	7 (1st)	4,571,000^{c}
9	Kellie Pickler	5 (6th)	4,189,000^{c}
10	David Archuleta	7 (2nd)	3,497,000^{c}
11	Kris Allen	8 (1st)	3,317,000^{c}
12	Scotty McCreery	10 (1st)	2,975,000^{c}
13	Jennifer Hudson	3 (7th)	2,605,000^{c}
14	Fantasia	3 (1st)	1,856,000
15	Elliott Yamin	5 (3rd)	1,615,000^{d}
16	Katharine McPhee	5 (2nd)	1,612,000
17	Josh Gracin	2 (4th)	1,432,000
18	Lauren Alaina	10 (2nd)	1,105,000^{c}
19	Blake Lewis	6 (2nd)	819,000
20	Bucky Covington	5 (7th)	811,000
21	Clay Aiken	2 (2nd)	674,000
22	Mandisa	5 (9th)	620,000^{a}
23	Bo Bice	4 (2nd)	555,000
24	Ruben Studdard	2 (1st)	455,000
25	Casey James	9 (3rd)	443,000^{a}
26	Lee DeWyze	9 (1st)	436,000^{a}
27	Jason Castro	7 (4th)	415,000
28	Taylor Hicks	5 (1st)	387,000
29	Haley Reinhart	10 (3rd)	386,000^{a}
30	Kimberley Locke	2 (3rd)	340,000
31	Crystal Bowersox	9 (2nd)	295,000
32	Mario Vazquez	4 (semifinal)	286,000
33	Danny Gokey	8 (3rd)	211,000
34	Allison Iraheta	8 (4th)	161,000
35	Colton Dixon	11 (7th)	134,000^{a}
36	William Hung	3 (auditioner)	127,000
37	Diana DeGarmo	3 (2nd)	119,000^{d}
38	Trent Harmon	15 (1st)	85,000^{a}
39	Pia Toscano	10 (9th)	65,000^{a}
40	Chris Medina	10 (Hollywood)	61,000^{a}
41	Nick Fradiani	14 (1st)	56,000^{a}
42	Candice Glover	12 (1st)	48,000^{a}
43	Kristy Lee Cook	7 (7th)	45,000^{a}
44	Jessica Sanchez	11 (2nd)	39,000^{a}
45	James Durbin	10 (4th)	37,000^{a}
46	Stefano Langone	10 (7th)	28,000^{a}
Total			132,943,000

- ^Note a As totaled from entries listed in this page and American Idol Hot 100 singles
- ^Note b Totalled from entries listed but also including album tracks not listed here or in American Idol Hot 100 singles
- ^Note c Including new single releases and extra sales since January 14, 2014.
- ^Note d Including new single releases and extra sales since January 21, 2012.

== Top songs ==
This is a list of songs that have charted on Billboard Hot 100 but does not include songs released during or soon after the final episode of American Idol of each contestant's season. Where a song has been certified gold but easily verifiable sales information is not available, the sales figure is provisionally assumed to be 500,000 or 100,000 as the case may be. The numbers may include physical single sales figures, however, it is rare for songs to be released as physical singles after 2006. A few songs were not released for sale and charted based on radio play only.

Note that the best-selling song by an American Idol alumnus is Phillip Phillips' "Home" which, being a coronation song, is listed in List of American Idol Hot 100 singles. Its sales stand at 5,400,000 as of December 2015.

The table is ranked in term of sales, but can be sorted other ways by clicking on the icon.

	Artist	Song	Season	Release Date	Album	Hot 100 Peak	RIAA Certification	SoundScan Sales
1	Carrie Underwood	"Before He Cheats"	4 (1st)	08-19-2006	Some Hearts	8	11× Platinum	11,000,000
2	Gabby Barrett	"I Hope"	16 (3rd)	6-27-2019	Goldmine	3	9× Platinum	9,000,000
3	Kelly Clarkson	"Stronger (What Doesn't Kill You)"	1 (1st)	01-17-2012	Stronger	1	7× Platinum	7,000,000
4	Carrie Underwood	"Blown Away"	4 (1st)	05-01-2012	Blown Away	20	5× Platinum	5,000,000
5	Gabby Barrett	"The Good Ones"	16 (3rd)	06-08-2020	Goldmine	32	5× Platinum	5,000,000
6	Carrie Underwood	"Cowboy Casanova"	4 (1st)	09-14-2009	Play On	11	4× Platinum	4,300,000
7	Carrie Underwood	"Jesus, Take The Wheel"	4 (1st)	10-03-2005	Some Hearts	20	3× Platinum	3,473,000
8	Jordin Sparks (with Chris Brown)	"No Air"	6 (1st)	02-11-2008	Jordin Sparks	3	Platinum	3,596,000
9	Kelly Clarkson	"My Life Would Suck Without You"	1 (1st)	01-13-2009	All I Ever Wanted	1	Platinum	2,973,000
10	Kelly Clarkson	"Since U Been Gone"	1 (1st)	12-14-2004	Breakaway	2	Platinum	2,855,000
11	Daughtry	"Home"	5 (4th)	04-10-2007	Daughtry	5	3× Platinum	2,425,000
12	Daughtry	"It's Not Over"	5 (4th)	11-21-2006	Daughtry	4	2× Platinum	2,344,000
13	Carrie Underwood	"Good Girl"	4 (1st)	02-23-2012	Blown Away	18	3× Platinum	2,290,000
14	Jordin Sparks	"Tattoo"	6 (1st)	09-25-2007	Jordin Sparks	8	Platinum	2,245,000
15	Kelly Clarkson	"Breakaway"	1 (1st)	07-19-2004	Breakaway	6	Gold	2,128,000
16	David Archuleta	"Crush"	7 (2nd)	08-12-2008	David Archuleta	2		2,127,000
17	Kelly Clarkson	"Because of You"	1 (1st)	08-28-2005	Breakaway	7	Platinum	2,079,000^{h}
18	Kelly Clarkson	"Already Gone"	1 (1st)	08-11-2009	All I Ever Wanted	13		2,009,000
19	Adam Lambert	"Whataya Want from Me"	8 (2nd)	11-20-2009	For Your Entertainment	10		2,006,000
20	Phillip Phillips	"Gone Gone Gone"	11 (1st)	11-19-2012	The World from the Side of the Moon	25	Platinum	2,000,000
21	Kelly Clarkson	"Mr. Know It All"	1 (1st)	09-05-2011	Stronger	10		1,919,000
22	Kelly Clarkson	"Catch My Breath"	1 (1st)	10-15-2012	Greatest Hits: Chapter One	19		1,834,000^{h}
23	Carrie Underwood	"All-American Girl"	4 (1st)	12-17-2007	Carnival Ride	27	2× Platinum	1,800,000
24	Kris Allen	"Live Like We're Dying"	8 (1st)	09-21-2009	Kris Allen	18	Platinum	1,750,000
25	Jordin Sparks	"Battlefield"	6 (1st)	05-12-2009	Battlefield	10		1,734,000
26	Kelly Clarkson	"Behind These Hazel Eyes"	1 (1st)	03-27-2005	Breakaway	6	Platinum	1,644,000
27	Carrie Underwood	"Undo It"	4 (1st)	05-24-2010	Play On	23	2× Platinum	1,600,000
28	Jordin Sparks	"One Step at a Time"	6 (1st)	06-10-2008	Jordin Sparks	17		1,423,000
29	Daughtry	"Over You"	5 (4th)	07-24-2007	Daughtry	18	2× Platinum	1,315,000
30	Kelly Clarkson	"Walk Away"	1 (1st)	01-31-2006	Breakaway	12	Gold	1,306,000
31	Carrie Underwood	"Last Name"	4 (1st)	04-08-2008	Carnival Ride	19	Platinum	1,300,000
32	Carrie Underwood	"Just a Dream"	4 (1st)	07-21-2008	Carnival Ride	29	2× Platinum	1,280,000
33	Kellie Pickler	"Best Days of Your Life"	5 (6th)	12-01-2008	Kellie Pickler	46	Platinum	1,224,000
34	Kelly Clarkson	"Never Again"	1 (1st)	04-23-2007	My December	8	Gold	1,211,000
35	Daughtry	"No Surprise"	5 (4th)	05-05-2009	Leave This Town	15	Gold	1,201,000
36	David Cook	"Light On"	7 (1st)	09-30-2008	David Cook	17	Platinum	1,166,000
37	Elliott Yamin	"Wait for You"	5 (3rd)	03-13-2007	Elliott Yamin	13	Platinum	1,113,000
38	Carrie Underwood	"Two Black Cadillacs"	4 (1st)	11-26-2012	Blown Away	41	2× Platinum	1,110,000
39	Carrie Underwood	"Temporary Home"	4 (1st)	10-20-2009	Play On	41	Platinum	1,093,000
40	Carrie Underwood	"Something in the Water"	4 (1st)	09-29-2014	Greatest Hits: Decade #1	24	2× Platinum	1,091,000
41	Carrie Underwood (feat. Randy Travis)	"I Told You So"	4 (1st)	02-02-2009	Carnival Ride	9	Platinum	1,089,000
42	Carrie Underwood	"So Small"	4 (1st)	08-14-2007	Carnival Ride	17	Platinum	1,088,000
43	Kelly Clarkson	"Miss Independent"	1 (1st)	04-10-2003	Thankful	9	Gold	1,035,000
44	Kelly Clarkson	"Love So Soft"	1 (1st)	09-07-2017	Meaning of Life	47	Platinum	1,000,000
45	Kelly Clarkson	"Heartbeat Song"	1 (1st)	01-12-2015	Piece by Piece	21	Platinum	909,000
46	Adam Lambert	"If I Had You"	8 (2nd)	05-05-2010	For Your Entertainment	30		892,000
47	Daughtry	"Life After You"	5 (4th)	11-10-2009	Leave This Town	36	Gold	890,000
48	Kelly Clarkson	"Dark Side"	1 (1st)	06-05-2012	Stronger	42		882,000
49	Daughtry	"Feels Like Tonight"	5 (4th)	01-08-2008	Daughtry	24	Platinum	839,000
50	Scotty McCreery	"The Trouble with Girls"	10 (1st)	08-30-2011	Clear as Day	55	Platinum	836,000
51	Kelly Clarkson	"I Do Not Hook Up"	1 (1st)	04-14-2009	All I Ever Wanted	20		823,000
52	Kelly Clarkson	"Piece by Piece"	1 (1st)	11-09-2015	Piece by Piece	8		813,000
53	Carrie Underwood	"Wasted"	4 (1st)	02-06-2007	Some Hearts	37	Platinum	784,000
54	Daughtry	"What About Now"	5 (4th)	07-01-2008	Daughtry	18		752,000
55	Carrie Underwood	"See You Again"	4 (1st)	04-15-2013	Blown Away	34	Platinum	740,000
56	Scotty McCreery	"See You Tonight"	10 (1st)	04-09-2013	See You Tonight	52	Platinum	693,000
57	Katharine McPhee	"Over It"	5 (2nd)	01-30-2007	Katharine McPhee	29	Gold	645,000
58	Daughtry	"September"	5 (4th)	06-01-2010	Leave This Town	36	Gold	563,000
59	David Cook	"Come Back to Me"	7 (1st)	03-23-2009	David Cook	63		538,000
60	Kelly Clarkson	"People Like Us"	1 (1st)	04-08-2013	Greatest Hits: Chapter One	65		526,000
61	Kellie Pickler	"Red High Heels"	5 (6th)	09-13-2006	Small Town Girl	64	Gold	513,000
62	Carrie Underwood	"Don't Forget to Remember Me"	4 (1st)	03-13-2006	Some Hearts	49	Gold	500,000
63	Carrie Underwood	"Mama's Song"	4 (1st)	09-13-2010	Play On	56	Platinum	500,000
64	Carrie Underwood	"Ghost Story"	4 (1st)	03-18-2022	Denim & Rhinestones	61	Gold	500,000
65	Daughtry	"Waiting for Superman"	5 (4th)	09-17-2013	Baptized	66	Platinum	500,000
66	Adam Lambert	"Ghost Town"	8 (2nd)	04-21-2015	The Original High	64	Gold	500,000
67	Fantasia	"When I See U"	3 (1st)	04-17-2007	Fantasia	32	Gold	500,000
68	Benson Boone	"Ghost Town"	19 (Hollywood)	10-15-2021	"Walk Me Home..."	100	Gold	500,000
69	Carrie Underwood	"Church Bells"	4 (1st)	04-11-2016	Storyteller	43	2× Platinum	456,000
70	Carrie Underwood	"Smoke Break"	4 (1st)	08-21-2015	Storyteller	43	Platinum	447,000
71	Carrie Underwood	"Little Toy Guns"	4 (1st)	02-16-2015	Greatest Hits: Decade Number 1	47	Platinum	437,000
72	Jennifer Hudson	"Spotlight"	3 (7th)	06-10-2008	Jennifer Hudson	24		426,000
73	Scotty McCreery	"Five More Minutes"	10 (1st)	05-05-2017	Seasons Change	44	2× Platinum	382,000
74	Adam Lambert	"For Your Entertainment"	8 (2nd)	10-30-2009	For Your Entertainment	61		378,352
75	Kellie Pickler	"Didn't You Know How Much I Loved You"	5 (6th)	08-31-2009	Kellie Pickler	97		356,000
76	Josh Gracin	"Nothin' to Lose"	2 (4th)	08-31-2004	Josh Gracin^{e}	39	Gold^{d}	351,000
77	Carrie Underwood	"Heartbeat"	4 (1st)	11-30-2015	Storyteller	42	Platinum	348,000
78	Kellie Pickler	"I Wonder"	5 (6th)	02-05-2007	Small Town Girl	75		347,000
79	Kelly Clarkson (feat. Vince Gill)	"Don't Rush"	1 (1st)	10-30-2012	Greatest Hits: Chapter One	89		346,000
80	Casey James	"Crying on a Suitcase"	9 (3rd)	06-14-2012	Casey James	90		337,000
81	Clay Aiken	"Solitaire"/"The Way"	2 (2nd)	03-17-2004	Measure of a Man	4		322,000^{c}
82	Carrie Underwood	"The Champion" (featuring Ludacris)	4 (1st)	01-12-2018	Cry Pretty	47	Platinum	314,000
83	Scotty McCreery	"Feelin' It"	10 (1st)	04-13-2014	See You Tonight	84	Gold	296,000
84	Phillip Phillips	"Raging Fire"	11 (1st)	03-03-2014	Behind the Light	58		295,000
85	Josh Gracin	"We Weren't Crazy"	2 (4th)	10-29-2007	We Weren't Crazy	82		289,000
86	Mario Vazquez	"Gallery"	4 (semi)	05-02-2006	Mario Vazquez	35		285,601
87	Bucky Covington	"A Different World"	5 (8th)	01-16-2007	Bucky Covington	58		278,000
88	Carrie Underwood	"Dirty Laundry"	4 (1st)	05-01-2012	Storyteller	48	Platinum	271,000
89	Daughtry	"Crawling Back to You"	5 (4th)	10-4-2011	Break the Spell	41	Platinum	243,000
90	Lauren Alaina	"Road Less Traveled"	10 (2nd)	07-11-2016	Road Less Traveled	80		204,000
91	David Cook	"Permanent"	7 (1st)	05-18-2009	David Cook	24		203,000^{f}
92	Carrie Underwood	"Cry Pretty"	4 (1st)	04-11-2018	Cry Pretty	48	Gold	189,000
93	Bucky Covington	"I'll Walk"	5 (8th)	04-28-2008	Bucky Covington	70		171,000
94	Bo Bice	"The Real Thing"	4 (2nd)	12-01-2005	The Real Thing	56		148,644
95	Jimmie Allen	"Best Shot"	11 (Hollywood)	02-20-2018	Mercury Lane	32	Platinum	146,000
96	Adam Lambert	"Time for Miracles"	8 (2nd)	10-18-2009	For Your Entertainment	50		136,706
97	Kelly Clarkson	"All I Ever Wanted"	1 (1st)	03-09-2010	All I Ever Wanted	96		129,000
98	Jennifer Hudson	"If This Isn't Love"	3 (7th)	02-24-2009	Jennifer Hudson	63		127,000
99	Adam Lambert	"Better Than I Know Myself"	8 (2nd)	12-20-2011	Trespassing	76		123,000
100	Scotty McCreery	"This Is It"	10 (1st)	07-05-2018	Seasons Change	42	Platinum	115,000
101	Danny Gokey	"My Best Days Are Ahead of Me"	8 (3rd)	12-26-2009	My Best Days	82		107,000
102	Clay Aiken	"Invisible"	2 (2nd)	09-2003	Measure of a Man	37	Gold^{d}	104,000
103	Jennifer Hudson	"Where You At"	3 (7th)	02-08-2011	I Remember Me	64		93,000
104	Fantasia	"Bittersweet"	3 (1st)	05-11-2010	Back to Me	74		90,000
105	Carrie Underwood	"Southbound"	4 (1st)	04-29-2019	Cry Pretty	64	Gold	89,000
106	Bucky Covington	"It's Good to Be Us"	5 (8th)	09-10-2007	Bucky Covington	81		86,000
107	Josh Gracin	"Stay with Me (Brass Bed)"	2 (4th)	04-26-2005	Josh Gracin^{e}	47		85,000
108	Kimberley Locke	"8th World Wonder"	2 (3rd)	03-16-2004	One Love	49		82,000
109	Josh Gracin	"I Want to Live"	2 (4th)	03-22-2004	Josh Gracin^{e}	45		77,000
100	Kellie Pickler	"Things That Never Cross a Man's Mind"	5 (6th)	09-10-2007	Small Town Girl	96		77,000
111	Jordin Sparks	"I Am Woman"	6 (1st)	05-10-2011		82		77,000
112	Carrie Underwood	"Love Wins"	4 (1st)	08-31-2018	Cry Pretty	83	Gold	70,000
113	Chris Medina	"What Are Words"	10 (Vegas)	02-25-2011	What Are Words	83		61,000
114	Nick Fradiani	"Beautiful Life"	14 (1st)	5-12-2015		93		50,000
115	David Archuleta	"Angels" (album version)	7 (2nd)	10-27-2008	David Archuleta	89		42,000
116	Carrie Underwood	"Drinking Alone"	4 (1st)	11-04-2019	Cry Pretty	74	Gold	35,000
117	Elliott Yamin	"Movin' On"	5 (3rd)	02-27-2007	Elliott Yamin	61		26,395^{g}
118	Jimmie Allen	"Make Me Want To"	11 (Hollywood)	02-01-2019	Mercury Lane	49	Platinum	34,000
119	Kelly Clarkson	"I'll Be Home for Christmas"	1 (1st)	12-06-2011	iTunes Session	93		24,000
120	Jennifer Hudson	"And I Am Telling You I'm Not Going"	3 (7th)	12-05-2006	Dreamgirls	60		13,845
121	Kelly Clarkson	"Low"	1 (1st)	08-25-2003	Thankful	58		
122	Ruben Studdard	"Sorry 2004"	2 (1st)	12-02-2003	Soulful	9		
123	Ruben Studdard	"Change Me"	2 (1st)	07-31-2006	The Return	94		
124	Fantasia	"Truth Is"	3 (1st)	12-07-2004	Free Yourself	21		
125	Fantasia	"Baby Mama"	3 (1st)	05-03-2005	Free Yourself	60		
126	Fantasia	"Free Yourself"	3 (1st)	06-01-2005	Free Yourself	41		
127	Carrie Underwood	"Do You Hear What I Hear?"	4 (1st)	06-11-2007	Hear Something Country Christmas 2007	90		
128	Kelly Clarkson (with Ariana Grande)	"Santa, Can't You Hear Me"	1 (1st)	12-09-2022	When Christmas Comes Around...	76		
129	Kelly Clarkson	"Underneath the Tree"	1 (1st)	11-05-2013	Wrapped in Red	8		
130	Kelly Clarkson	"I Dare You"	1 (1st)	04-16-2020	—N/a	86		
131	Kelly Clarkson (with Brett Eldredge)	"Under the Mistletoe"	1 (1st)	10-28-2020	—N/a	59		
132	Carrie Underwood (with John Legend)	"Hallelujah"	4 (1st)	11-13-2020	My Gift	54		
133	Lauren Spencer-Smith	"Fingers Crossed"	18 (19th)	01-05-2022		19		

- ^Note hThe numbers for Kelly Clarkson's "Stronger (What Doesn't Kill You)", "Mr Know It All", and "Catch My Breath" include sales of different versions of those songs. Sales numbers for other versions of "Mr Know It All", "Stronger (What Doesn't Kill You)", and "Catch My Breath" are 49,000, 35,000, and 45,000, respectively. "Because of You" does not include the duet with Reba McEntire and it has sold 621,000 copies.
- ^Note cThis figure is for physical single of The Way/Solitaire. Digital download of The Way is 36,000.
- ^Note dGold certification for digital sale was only 100,000 before July 2006 (Clay Aiken's Invisible was certified gold in March 2006).
- ^Note eNo physical singles were available for Josh Gracin.
- ^Note fThis is the rounded combined total of last known sales figures of the live charity single and the album version of David Cook's Permanent. The charity single sold 61,000 as of June 3, 2009, and the album version sold 142,354 as of May 29, 2011.
- ^Note gSales number for first week on chart only.

== Uncharted songs ==
This is a list of some of the other more notable releases with sales information but did not chart on Billboard Hot 100. It is not intended to be a comprehensive list of all singles released by American Idol alums.

Artist	Single	Season	Release Date	Album	Sales
Carrie Underwood	"How Great Thou Art"	4 (1st)	02-03-2008	How Great Thou Art	599,000
Mandisa (feat. TobyMac)	"Good Morning"	5 (9th)	04-05-2011	What If We Were Real	311,000
Mandisa	"Stronger"	5 (9th)	01-07-2011	What If We Were Real	309,000
Haley Reinhart	"Can't Help Falling in Love"	10 (3rd)	10-09-2015	Better	RIAA: Platinum
David Archuleta	"A Little Too Not Over You"	7 (2nd)	01-06-2009	David Archuleta	247,000
Carrie Underwood	"Some Hearts"	4 (1st)	10-29-2005	Some Hearts	207,000
Lauren Alaina	"Georgia Peaches"	10 (2nd)	10-24-2011	Wildflower	189,000
Kellie Pickler	"Don't You Know You're Beautiful"	5 (6th)	06-09-2008	Kellie Pickler	179,000
Jennifer Hudson & Ne-Yo	"Think Like a Man"	3 (7th)	01-31-2012	I Remember Me	176,000
Clay Aiken	"Mary, Did You Know?"	2 (2nd)	11-16-2004	Merry Christmas with Love	143,000
Kris Allen (feat. Pat Monahan)	"The Truth"	8 (1st)	05-11-2010	Kris Allen	137,000
Jason Castro	"Hallelujah"	7 (4th)	Oct 2009	Jason Castro	131,000
Kellie Pickler	"Tough"	5 (6th)	06-13-2011	100 Proof	124,000
Carrie Underwood	"Flat On the Floor"	4 (1st)	10-22-2007	Carnival Ride	121,000
Jason Castro	"Let's Just Fall in Love Again"	7 (4th)	Oct 2009	The Love Uncompromised EP	118,000
Kelly Clarkson	"Sober"	1 (1st)	07-10-2007	My December	113,000
Daughtry (feat. Slash)	"What I Want"	5 (4th)	04-23-2007	Daughtry	112,000
Jordin Sparks	"S.O.S. (Let the Music Play)"	6 (1st)	09-04-2009	Battlefield	111,000
Casey James	"Let's Don't Call It a Night"	9 (3rd)	08-15-2011	Casey James	106,000
Blake Lewis	"How Many Words"	6 (2nd)	03-10-2008	A.D.D. (Audio Day Dream)	94,000
Scotty McCreery	"Water Tower Town"	10 (1st)	04-09-2012	Clear as Day	93,000
Katharine McPhee	"Love Story"	5 (2nd)	05-22-2007	Katharine McPhee	92,000
Colton Dixon	"You Are"	11 (7th)	10-30-2012	A Messenger	88,000
Blake Lewis	"Break Anotha"	6 (2nd)	10-30-2007	A.D.D. (Audio Day Dream)	85,000
Katharine McPhee	"Terrified"	5 (2nd)	05-04-2010	Unbroken	83,000
Kellie Pickler	"Makin' Me Fall in Love Again"	5 (6th)	04-19-2010	Kellie Pickler	82,000
Danny Gokey	"Tell Your Heart to Beat Again"	5 (6th)	06-23-2014	Hope in Front of Me	77,000
Trent Harmon	"There's a Girl"	15 (1st)	06-24-2016		69,000
Fantasia	"Lose to Win"	3 (1st)	01-08-2013	Side Effects of You	69,000
David Archuleta	"Something 'Bout Love"	7 (2nd)	07-20-2010	The Other Side of Down	64,000
Haley Reinhart	"Free"	10 (3rd)	03-20-2012	Listen Up!	61,000
Allison Iraheta	"Friday I'll Be Over U"	8 (4th)	11-03-2009	Just Like You	54,000
Pia Toscano	"This Time"	10 (9th)	07-13-2011	TBA	51,000
Colton Dixon	"Never Gone"	11 (7th)	09-25-2012	A Messenger	46,000
David Cook	"The Last Goodbye"	7 (1st)	04-19-2011	This Loud Morning	45,000
Kristy Lee Cook	"15 Minutes of Shame"	7 (7th)	08-12-2008	Why Wait	45,000
Lee DeWyze	"Sweet Serendipity"	9 (1st)	10-13-2010	Live It Up	44,000
Jason Castro	"Only a Mountain"	7 (4th)	07-08-2012	Only a Mountain	44,000
Lauren Alaina	"Eighteen Inches"	10 (2nd)	07-16-2012	Wildflower	39,000
Jessica Sanchez	"Tonight"	11 (2nd)	03-22-2013	Me, You & the Music	39,000
Adam Lambert	"Never Close Our Eyes"	8 (2nd)	04-17-2012	Trespassing	37,000
Bucky Covington	"A Father's Love (The Only Way He Knew How)"	5 (8th)	03-08-2010	Good Guys	31,000
Kelly Clarkson	"Tie It Up"	1 (1st)	06-25-2013		29,000
Kimberley Locke	"Mary, Did You Know?"	2 (3rd)	11-06-2007	Christmas	28,000
Lauren Alaina	"Barefoot and Buckwild"	10 (2nd)	05-07-2013		28,000
Stefano Langone feat. New Boyz & Rock Mafia	"I'm on a Roll"	10 (7th)	04-24-2012		27,573
Kris Allen	"The Vision of Love"	8 (1st)	03-26-2012	Thank You Camellia	25,000
Haley Reinhart feat. Casey Abrams	"Baby, It's Cold Outside"	10 (3rd/6th)	11-21-2011		25,000
Daughtry	"Outta My Head"	5 (4th)	13-03-2012	Break the Spell	24,000
Lee DeWyze	"Beautiful Like You"	9 (1st)	03-15-2011	Live It Up	22,000
David Cook	"The Last Song I'll Write for You"	7 (1st)	05-10-2012		15,000
David Cook	"Laying Me Low"	7 (1st)	04-30-2013		14,000
James Durbin	"Higher than Heaven"	10 (4th)	11-22-2011	Memories of a Beautiful Disaster	13,000
Diana DeGarmo	"Good Goodbye"	3 (2nd)	03-20-2012	Live to Love - EP	13,000
James Durbin	"Stand Up"	10 (4th)	09-27-2011	Memories of a Beautiful Disaster	12,000
James Durbin	"Love Me Bad"	10 (4th)	11-22-2011	Memories of a Beautiful Disaster	11,000
Lee DeWyze	"Silver Lining"	9 (1st)	04-25-2010		11,000
Daughtry	"Start of Something Good"	5 (4th)	11-21-2011	Break the Spell	10,000
Kellie Pickler	"Someone Somewhere Tonight"	5 (6th)	05-14-2013		9,000
Haley Reinhart	"Undone"	10 (3rd)	05-22-2012	Listen Up!	8,000
Clay Aiken	"Bring Back My Love"	2 (2nd)	12-20-2011		5,000
