= American Idol (disambiguation) =

American Idol may refer to:

- American Idol, original series on Fox from 2002 to 2016
  - American Idol: The Search for a Superstar, title of season 1 in 2002
  - American Idol: The Farewell Season, title of final season 15 in 2016
- American Idol (ABC TV series), revived series on ABC starting 2018
- Latin American Idol

== Various ==
- The American Idol Experience, a theme park attraction at Disney's Hollywood Studios at the Walt Disney World Resort
- American Idol Rewind, syndicated television series that ran from September 30, 2006, to May 15, 2010
- American Idol (video game)
- American Idols LIVE! Tour 2007
- American Idol: Greatest Moments, first American Idol soundtrack, with music from the first season of American Idol.

== See also ==
- Idol (disambiguation)
- List of American Idol finalists
- List of American Idol episodes
- List of American Idol alumni album sales in the United States
- List of American Idol alumni single sales in the United States
- List of American Idol Hot 100 singles
- American Idol contestants discography
- American Idol controversies
- American Idol compilation series
