= Goin' Country =

- Starring: Kristy Lee Cook
- Country of origin: United States
- No. of episodes: Active Production

Production
- Production location: United States
- Running time: 30 minutes

Original release
- Network: Versus
- Release: 2010 – 2012

Goin' Country is a reality show, produced by Wes Whatley with Orion Multimedia, that began airing Sunday mornings at nine in August 2010 on the Versus channel. It follows former American Idol contestant Kristy Lee Cook and is centered on hunting and her search for a new recording contract. Eight episodes were shot for the first season. No new episodes have aired on NBC Sports Network.

== Production ==
The show grew out of a relationship between Cook and firearms and outdoor equipment manufacturer Browning which started after Cook was shown wearing a Browning hat during an American Idol segment. Browning is a sponsor of the show.

The pilot episode of the show first aired May 22, 2010 and featured Cook hunting Texas white-tail deer and writing a new song in Nashville.

Cook was joined on the show by family, friends and celebrity guests, including fellow former American Idol contestant Blake Lewis, and country music singers Jake Owen and Aaron Tippin.

== Controversy ==
The show has drawn the ire of PETA who issued a statement referring to it as her "Fifteen Minutes of Shame" and suggesting she should instead follow in the footsteps of fellow American Idol alumni Kellie Pickler, Carrie Underwood and Simon Cowell who PETA says have used their fame and talent to speak up for animals. Cook responded to PETA's comments with positive statements about hunting and pointed out that the show also highlights her animal-related charity, "Kristy Lee's Horse Heaven Foundation", which rescues abused or neglected horses. News of the show has also provoked a negative reaction from some of her fans.
