= List of American Idol Hot 100 singles =

This is a list of songs released for sale from the show American Idol, consisting of recordings of coronation songs by winners and runners-up of the show, live and studio recordings by contestants, songs from the American Idol CDs, as well as special singles released by the show such as those for Idol Gives Back and specially-recorded boot songs. Songs released by Idol alumni in post-Idol career are not included here. See American Idol alumni single sales for a list of some of those releases.

In the first few seasons, songs were released as physical CD single which may contain one cover song and one original song. However, after Season 5 physical singles were no longer released, and songs were available only as digital downloads starting Season 6. The digital downloads were only available initially via American Idol official website during the season towards the end of Season 5 and all the final rounds of Season 6, but were then made available from iTunes after the Season 6 ended. In all subsequent seasons all performances were made available in iTunes during the season and after the season has ended.

The digital songs sold during the season were not eligible to chart, and their sales figures were not released. Any number listed for those songs would be solely based on units sold after the finale.

== All Hot 100 singles ==
The following Idol songs have charted on the Billboard Hot 100 chart.

Entry date	Single	Artist	Peak	Sales	RIAA cert.
September 21, 2002	"A Moment Like This" (b/w "Before Your Love")	Kelly Clarkson (Season 1, Winner)	1	738,000 (Digital); 627,000 (Physical)	Gold
May 3, 2003	"God Bless the USA"	American Idol Finalists (Season 2 Finalists)	4	310,000 (Physical)	Gold
June 28, 2003	"Flying Without Wings" (b/w "Superstar")	Ruben Studdard (Season 2, Winner)	2	790,000 (Physical + Digital); 737,000 (Physical)	Gold
June 28, 2003	"This Is the Night" (b/w "Bridge over Troubled Water")	Clay Aiken (Season 2, Runner-Up)	1	960,000 (Physical) 52,000 (Digital)	Platinum
July 10, 2004	"I Believe"	Fantasia (Season 3, Winner)	1	559,000 (Physical + Digital); 406,000 (Physical)	
July 17, 2004	"Dreams" (b/w I Believe/Don't Cry Out Loud)	Diana DeGarmo (Season 3, Runner-Up)	14	202,000 (Physical) 23,000 (Digital)	
May 7, 2005	"When You Tell Me That You Love Me"	American Idol Finalists (Season 4 Finalists)	39	115,100 (Physical)	
July 2, 2005	"Inside Your Heaven" (b/w "Independence Day")	Carrie Underwood (Season 4, Winner)	1	880,000 (Physical + Digital); 459,000 (Physical)	Gold
July 9, 2005	"Inside Your Heaven" (b/w "Vehicle" featuring Richie Sambora)	Bo Bice (Season 4, Runner-Up)	2	349,000 (Physical) 52,000 (Digital)	Gold
June 10, 2006	"Wanted Dead or Alive"	Chris Daughtry (Season 5, 4th Place)	43	103,000 (Digital)	
June 10, 2006	"Takin' It to the Streets"	Taylor Hicks (Season 5, Winner)	69	71,000 (Digital)	
July 1, 2006	"Do I Make You Proud"	Taylor Hicks	1	709,000 (Physical + Digital); 464,000 (Physical)	
July 15, 2006	"Over the Rainbow"	Katharine McPhee (Season 5, Runner-Up)	12	131,000 (Digital)	
July 15, 2006	"My Destiny"	Katharine McPhee	60	169,000 (Physical) 98,000 (Digital)	
May 12, 2007	"I'll Stand by You"	Carrie Underwood	6	339,147	
May 12, 2007	"Up to the Mountain"	Kelly Clarkson featuring Jeff Beck	56	46,196	
June 9, 2007	"This Is My Now"	Jordin Sparks (Season 6, Winner)	15	334,000	
June 9, 2007	"You Give Love a Bad Name"	Blake Lewis (Season 6, Runner-Up)	18	192,000	
June 9, 2007	"A Broken Wing"	Jordin Sparks	66	52,000	
June 9, 2007	"I (Who Have Nothing)""	Jordin Sparks	80	44,000	
June 9, 2007	"Time of the Season"	Blake Lewis	99	39,000	
April 26, 2008	"Praying for Time"	Carrie Underwood	27	87,286	
April 26, 2008	"Shout to the Lord"	American Idol Finalists (Season 7 Top 8 Finalists)	43	55,745	
April 26, 2008	"Many Rivers to Cross"	Annie Lennox	80	29,159	
June 7, 2008	"The Time of My Life"	David Cook (Season 7, Winner)	3	1,482,000	Platinum
June 7, 2008	"Dream Big"	David Cook	15	145,000	
June 7, 2008	"I Still Haven't Found What I'm Looking For"	David Cook	22	125,000	
June 7, 2008	"The World I Know"	David Cook	28	96,000	
June 7, 2008	"Imagine"	David Archuleta (Season 7, Runner-Up)	36	80,000	
June 7, 2008	"I Don't Want to Miss a Thing"	David Cook	42	60,000	
June 7, 2008	"Billie Jean"	David Cook	47	56,300	
June 7, 2008	"Don't Let the Sun Go Down On Me"	David Archuleta	58	61,000	
June 7, 2008	"In This Moment"	David Archuleta	60	61,000	
June 7, 2008	"Always Be My Baby"	David Cook	67	46,600	
June 7, 2008	"Hello"	David Cook	73	42,300	
June 7, 2008	"The Music of the Night"	David Cook	77	36,000	
June 7, 2008	"Eleanor Rigby"	David Cook	92	28,000	
June 7, 2008	"I'm Alive"	David Cook	99	25,000	
June 6, 2009	"No Boundaries"	Kris Allen (Season 8, Winner)	11	343,000	
June 6, 2009	"Heartless"	Kris Allen	16	412,000	
June 6, 2009	"Mad World"	Adam Lambert (Season 8, Runner-Up)	19	256,000	
June 6, 2009	"Ain't No Sunshine"	Kris Allen	37	125,000	
June 6, 2009	"A Change Is Gonna Come"	Adam Lambert	56	63,000	
June 6, 2009	"Apologize"	Kris Allen	66	59,000	
June 6, 2009	"No Boundaries"	Adam Lambert	72	68,000	
June 6, 2009	"One"	Adam Lambert	82	46,000	
June 6, 2009	"Falling Slowly"	Kris Allen	94	38,000	
March 13, 2010	"Let It Be"	Kris Allen	63	86,000	
June 12, 2010	"Beautiful Day"	Lee DeWyze (Season 9, Winner)	24	186,000	
June 12, 2010	"Hallelujah"	Lee DeWyze	44	118,000	
June 12, 2010	"Up to the Mountain"	Crystal Bowersox (Season 9, Runner-Up)	57	63,000	
June 12, 2010	"Falling Slowly"	Crystal Bowersox and Lee DeWyze	66	85,000	
June 12, 2010	"The Boxer"	Lee DeWyze	88	37,000	
June 11, 2011	"I Love You This Big"	Scotty McCreery (Season 10, Winner)	11	915,000	Platinum
June 11, 2011	"Like My Mother Does"	Lauren Alaina (Season 10, Runner-Up)	20	398,000	
June 9, 2012	"Home"	Phillip Phillips (Season 11, Winner)	6	5,400,000	4× Platinum
June 9, 2012	"We've Got Tonite"	Phillip Phillips	97	58,000	
June 1, 2013	"I Am Beautiful"	Candice Glover (Season 12, Winner)	94	48,000	
May 20, 2015	"Beautiful Life"	Nick Fradiani (Season 14, Winner)	93	50,000	

== Bubbling Under Hot 100 singles ==
The following songs failed to reach the Hot 100, but managed to make the Bubbling Under Hot 100 Singles charts.

Entry Date	Single	Artist	Peak	Sales
July 5, 2003	"Superstar"	Ruben Studdard	12	
June 10, 2006	"Moody's Mood for Love"	Elliott Yamin (Season 5, 3rd Place)	1	25,000
June 10, 2006	"Think"	Katharine McPhee	21	21,000
June 9, 2007	"This Love"	Blake Lewis	2	38,000
June 9, 2007	"When the Stars Go Blue"	Blake Lewis	10	31,000
June 9, 2007	"I Need to Know"	Blake Lewis	19	23,000
April 26, 2008	"Don't Stop The Music"	American Idol Finalists	23	14,040
June 7, 2008	"Little Sparrow"	David Cook	1	24,000
June 7, 2008	"Hungry Like the Wolf"	David Cook	3	23,000
June 7, 2008	"Innocent"	David Cook	4	23,000
June 7, 2008	"Hallelujah"	Jason Castro (Season 7, 4th Place)	13	19,000
June 7, 2008	"Day Tripper"	David Cook	14	19,000
June 7, 2008	"Longer"	David Archuleta	15	19,000
June 7, 2008	"All Right Now"	David Cook	18	18,000
June 7, 2008	"Think of Me"	David Archuleta	19	18,000
June 7, 2008	"Angels"	David Archuleta	24	17,000
June 7, 2008	"Happy Together"	David Cook	25	17,000
June 6, 2009	"Cryin'"	Adam Lambert	2	35,000
June 6, 2009	"Slow Ride"	Allison Iraheta (Season 8, 4th Place) and Adam Lambert	5	34,000
June 6, 2009	"What's Going On"	Kris Allen	7	21,000
June 6, 2009	"To Make You Feel My Love"	Kris Allen	13	26,000
June 6, 2009	"The Tracks of My Tears"	Adam Lambert	17	26,000
June 6, 2009	"Feeling Good"	Adam Lambert	21	25,000
June 6, 2009	"You Are So Beautiful"	Danny Gokey (Season 8, 3rd Place)	25	15,000
June 12, 2010	"Everybody Hurts"	Lee DeWyze	4	22,000
June 12, 2010	"Black Velvet"	Crystal Bowersox	24	15,000
June 12, 2010	"Me and Bobby McGee"	Crystal Bowersox	25	14,000
June 9, 2012	"Volcano"	Phillip Phillips	9	49,000
June 9, 2012	"Stand by Me"	Phillip Phillips	24	24,000
April 30, 2015	"Falling"	Trent Harmon (Season 15, Winner)	16	52,000

== Year-End Hot 100 singles ==
The following songs ranked in the Year-End charts for the Billboard Hot 100.

Year	Single	Artist	Rank
2002	"A Moment Like This"	Kelly Clarkson	39
2003	"This Is the Night"	Clay Aiken	47
2003	"Flying Without Wings"	Ruben Studdard	88
2005	"Inside Your Heaven"	Carrie Underwood	71
2006	"Do I Make You Proud"	Taylor Hicks	99
2008	"The Time of My Life"	David Cook	69
2012	"Home"	Phillip Phillips	49
2013	"Home"	Phillip Phillips	46

== Send-off songs ==
Starting Season 5, when contestants in the final rounds are eliminated, a video of their journey through the contest was shown, accompanied by a song as a send-off. The song is also commonly called the "boot song".

Season	Single	Artist	Peak	Sales	RIAA cert.
5	"Bad Day"	Daniel Powter	1	3,000,000	3× Platinum
6	"Home"	Daughtry	5	2,349,000	Platinum
7	"Celebrate Me Home"	Ruben Studdard	—		
7	"Hollywood's Not America"	Ferras	62		
7	"Best Days"	Graham Colton	—		
8	"Home Sweet Home"	Carrie Underwood	21	300,000	
9	"Leave Right Now"	Will Young	81	50,000	
10	"Don't You (Forget About Me)"	David Cook	—	33,000	
11	"Please Remember Me"	Scotty McCreery	—	58,000	
12	"Gone Gone Gone"	Phillip Phillips	24	2,000,000	Platinum
13	"Breakaway"	Eliminated contestant	—	—	—
"—" denotes the song did not chart in Hot 100.
