= 15 Minutes of Shame =

Single by Kristy Lee Cook

from the album Why Wait
- Released: August 12, 2008
- Genre: Country
- Length: 2:59
- Label: Arista Nashville
- Songwriters: Kelly Archer; Casey Kessel; Justin Weaver
- Producer: Brett James

Kristy Lee Cook singles chronology
"15 Minutes of Shame" (2008)	"Airborne Ranger Infantry" (2012)

Music video
- "15 Minutes of Shame" at CMT.com

"15 Minutes of Shame" is the debut single by American country music artist Kristy Lee Cook, written by Kelly Archer, Casey Kessel and Justin Weaver. It was released in August 2008 from the album Why Wait. The single is also her first entry on the Billboard country charts, reaching a peak of number 28 in November 2008.

== Content ==
"15 Minutes of Shame" centralizes on the female narrator, who explains that she is going to tell everyone what she knows about her partner, who has been unfaithful and lied to her ("Every single lie you told, I'm tellin'"). She explains that "every girl in the world's gonna know [his] name", and that she hopes he enjoys his "15 minutes of shame" for his actions. The title is a play on the famous quote by Andy Warhol about everyone getting 15 minutes of fame.

== Critical reception ==
Common Sense wrote that the song is "a blend of mainstream pop with a country twang, and works surprisingly well in both musical styles and that the lyrics — full of sass and spunk — benefit from Cook's vocals and keep the single lighter and more fun despite the injections of bitterness and mean-spiritedness." "15 Minutes of Shame" got 3 stars from Common Sense.

== Music video ==
The video for the song was released on the CMT website on October 30, 2008.

== Chart performance ==
"15 Minutes of Shame" debuted at number 58 on the Hot Country Songs chart dated for the week of August 16, 2008.

Chart (2008)	Peak position
US Hot Country Songs (Billboard)	28
