= Mario Vazquez =

American singer

- Born: Mario Adrian Vazquez; June 15, 1977 (age 49); The Bronx, New York City, US
- Genres: Pop; R&B
- Occupation: Singer
- Instrument: Vocals
- Years active: 2005–present
- Label: Arista Records (2006–2007)

Mario Adrián Vázquez (born June 15, 1977) is an American singer from The Bronx, New York City. He competed on American Idol's fourth season, which aired on the FOX network in early 2005.

== Biography ==
=== Early life ===
Raised by his single mother, Ada, in the Bronx, Vazquez is an alumnus of Fiorello H. LaGuardia High School. He was also involved in the CityKids Repertory Company in New York City, which enabled him to travel the country and perform in front of the President and at major charitable functions and shelters. In 2005, he was reunited with his estranged father, Mario Rivera, who discovered that his son was on American Idol while channel surfing.

=== American Idol ===
After making it into the final round of twelve contestants on the hit reality show American Idol, Vazquez suddenly dropped out of the competition citing "personal family thing" a few days before the finals started. When the press contacted his mother regarding his decision, she was unaware why he had left the show.

There was much speculation about his decision; Vazquez appeared the next morning on "Good Day New York" on WNYW FOX5, and quashed rumors of a feud with "American Idol" producers or any of his competitors. "American Idol was only positive. They were only wonderful to me, from the beginning through the middle, to the end," he told the show. "It had nothing to do with the contract or anything signed with J Records." J Records is the same company that manages Idol winners Ruben Studdard and Fantasia Barrino. Vazquez later said that he wanted more artistic control and creating his own sound. He felt that since he was now known worldwide as a semi-finalist, he could end the competition and go solo. He believed that his musical success would not make a difference whether he quit as a semi-finalist or participated in the finals round. Vazquez was replaced on the show by Nikko Smith, who had previously been voted out.

American Idol season 4 performances and results
Episode	Song Choice	Original Artist	Order #	Result
Auditions	"Whatever Happens"	Michael Jackson	N/A	Advanced
Hollywood Round, Part 1	"Bohemian Rhapsody"	Queen	N/A	Advanced
Hollywood Round, Part 2	"I Can't Help Myself (Sugar Pie Honey Bunch)" with Jamar Jefferson and Anwar Robinson	Four Tops	N/A	Advanced
Hollywood Round, Part 3	"How Can You Mend a Broken Heart"	The Bee Gees	N/A	Advanced
Top 24 (Top 12 Men)	"Do I Do"	Stevie Wonder	12	Safe
Top 20 (Top 10 Men)	"I Love Music"	The O'Jays	1	Safe
Top 16 (Top 8 Men)	"How Can You Mend a Broken Heart"	The Bee Gees	6	Quit^{1}

^1Originally making the Top 12, Vazquez withdrew from the show for personal reasons. He was replaced by Nikko Smith.

=== Music career ===
In August 2005, Vazquez signed with J Records/Arista Records and worked on an album executive produced by Clive Davis. Vazquez's manager was Arnold Stiefel, who also managed Rod Stewart. He worked with Ne-Yo, Akon, Soulshock and Karlin, Lester Mendez, Scott Storch, and Luny Tunes. Some of these artists' songs with Vazquez did not make the final cut on his album. His first single "Gallery" was released in May 2006, and reached number 35 on the Billboard Hot 100 chart. Vazquez's self-titled album was released September 26, 2006 by Arista Records.

Later that year, Vazquez performed on the Cartoon Network Friday block on August 25, 2006. A second single "One Shot" was released to radio in February 2007.

After leaving J Records in 2008, he worked with a few dance DJs, appearing on collaborations with Hype Jones and Ted Nilsson in 2012.

== Controversy ==
In 2007, Magdaleno Olmos, an employee of Fremantle Media which produces American Idol, filed a lawsuit against Fremantle Media, Fox Entertainment, and Mario Vazquez claiming wrongful termination. The lawsuit alleged that Vazquez sexually harassed Olmos by performing a lewd act in front of him and offered sexual favors. Olmos claimed that he tried to report the incident to a superior but was threatened with dismissal, and he was "terminated" a few months after the incident. Olmos' lawyer also suggested that Idol producers had forced Vazquez out over the complaint, and claimed that Nigel Lythgoe, the show producer, had said to Olmos, "we know that this happened and we are going to let Mario Vazquez go, and you're going to stay."

Vazquez was reported to be "very upset, almost distraught" over the claim and that he didn't even remember Magdaleno Olmos. He had previously denied that he is gay and that he quit the show for "artistic reasons". The judge later ruled that Olmos had signed an agreement to "arbitrate all disputes and not file a lawsuit," and sent the case to arbitration and put a hold on the lawsuit.

== Discography ==
=== Albums ===
Year	Album details	Peak chart positions		Sales
Year	Album details	US	FRA	Sales
2006	Mario Vazquez: Released: September 26, 2006; Label: Arista	80	104	US: 56,000

=== Singles ===
List of singles, with selected chart positions
Title	Year	Peak chart positions				
Title	Year	US	AUS	FRA	SWE	SWI
"Gallery"	2006	35	42	15	27	35
"One Shot"	2007	—	—	—	—	—
"You Are the Only One" (with Hype Jones)	2012	—	—	—	—	—
