= Why Wait (album) =

Studio album by Kristy Lee Cook
- Released: September 16, 2008
- Genre: Country
- Length: 35:58
- Label: Arista Nashville
- Producer: Brett James

Kristy Lee Cook chronology
Devoted (2005)	Why Wait (2008)

Singles from Why Wait
- 1. "15 Minutes of Shame" Released: August 12, 2008

Professional ratings
Review scores
Source	Rating
AllMusic	3/5 stars
Country Weekly	3/5 stars

Why Wait is the second studio album by American country music artist Kristy Lee Cook. It was released on September 16, 2008, via Arista Nashville. The album's only single, "15 Minutes of Shame" has peaked at number 28 on the Hot Country Songs charts. The album debuted at number eight on the US Top Country albums chart, and at number 49 on the Billboard 200 with a first week sales of just under 10,000, and has sold 32,000 copies since its release. Cook was dropped by Arista Nashville in December the same year.

Two of the album tracks are cover versions. "God Bless the USA", was originally recorded by Lee Greenwood and "Cowgirls", a bonus track only available on iTunes, was originally recorded by Kerry Harvick for an unreleased album. "Like My Mother Does" was later recorded and released as singles by country singers Jesse Lee in 2010 and Lauren Alaina in 2011.

== Track listing ==
No.	Title	Writer(s)	Length
1.	"15 Minutes of Shame"	Kelly Archer, Casey Kessel, Justin Weaver	3:03
2.	"Why Wait"	Victoria Banks, Jesse Lee, Rachel Proctor	3:17
3.	"Like My Mother Does"	Nathan Chapman, Liz Rose, Nikki Williams	4:06
4.	"Hoping to Find"	Leah Crutchfield, Heather Morgan	4:04
5.	"Baby Believe"	Robin Lerner, Jamie O'Neal, Annie Roboff	4:20
6.	"Not Tonight"	Brett James, Chris Lindsey, Carrie Underwood	3:34
7.	"Plant the Seed"	Jon Henderson, Coley McCabe	3:23
8.	"I Think Too Much"	Ashley Gorley, Kelley Lovelace, Bryan Simpson	3:12
9.	"Homesick"	Clay Mills, Proctor	3:28
10.	"God Bless the U.S.A."	Lee Greenwood	3:31
11.	"Cowgirls"	Ryan Tyler, Hillary Lindsey, Angelo Petraglia	3:12^{A}

- ^{A} iTunes bonus track

== Personnel ==
- Kelly Archer - background vocals
- Mike Brignardello - bass guitar
- Randy Cantor - acoustic guitar, electric guitar, mandolin, mellotron, piano, strings, string arrangements
- Kristy Lee Cook - lead vocals
- J.T. Corenflos - electric guitar
- Eric Darken - percussion
- Larry Franklin - fiddle, mandolin
- Brett James - background vocals
- Mike Johnson - steel guitar
- Charlie Judge - keyboards
- Troy Lancaster - electric guitar
- Mike Rojas - keyboards
- Ilya Toshinsky - acoustic guitar
- Lonnie Wilson - drums

== Charts ==
=== Album ===
Chart (2008)	Peak position
U.S. Billboard Top Country Albums	8
U.S. Billboard 200	49
