= Mario Vazquez (album) =

Studio album by Mario Vazquez
- Released: September 26, 2006
- Length: 50:50
- Label: Arista
- Producers: Camus; Anthony Dent; Fernando Garibay; Jim Jonsin; Lester Mendez; Steve Morales; Soulshock & Karlin; StarGate; Scott Storch; Swizz Beatz; The Underdogs

Singles from Mario Vazquez
- 1. "Gallery" Released: April 17, 2006; 2. "One Shot" Released: March 2007

Mario Vazquez is the debut studio album by American singer Mario Vazquez. It was released by Stiefel Entertainment and Arista Records on September 26, 2006 in the United States. The album did not fare well in its first week on sale, coming in at number 80 on US Billboard 200, selling slightly more than 12,000 units. In France, Mario Vazquez peaked at number 104 on the French Albums Chart.

== Critical reception ==
Professional ratings
Review scores
Source	Rating
AllMusic	2.5/5 stars
New York Post	3/4 stars
USA Today	2.5/4 stars

Dan Aquilante of New York Post gave Vazquez's self-titled debut a three-star rating, praising its authenticity and departure from the polished formula associated with American Idol. He highlighted the album's harder-edged reggaeton collaborations and Vazquez's more personal artistic direction. Writing for USA Today, Elysa Gardner gave the album a two-and-a-half-star rating, praising his "sweetly fluid" tenor and rhythmic ability while criticizing the album's formulaic material. She highlighted "One Shot" and "Don't Lie" as signs of his potential for future growth.

AllMusic's Andy Kellman found Mario Vazquez uneven, criticizing the album's lack of focus and describing Vazquez as tentative across a range of styles. He suggested that a more personalized approach and tighter songwriting could lead to stronger future releases. Ericka Souter, writing for People, also criticized the various genre-hopping throughout the album but gave credit to the first two tracks for properly showcasing Vazquez's vocal talents and charisma, saying that he's "still worthy of a little idol worship." Julianne Shepherd of Vibe praised the Latin pop tracks for displaying Vazquez's tenor but found diversions away from it make his voice lack style. She concluded by advising Vazquez that, "until he can personalize every track, he'll still be just another Idol: an able singer belting someone else's songs."

== Track listing ==
Standard edition
No.	Title	Writer(s)	Producer(s)	Length
1.	"Gallery"	Shaffer Smith; Erik Tor Hermansen; Mikkel Eriksen	StarGate; Ne-Yo^{[a]}	3:43
2.	"I Bet"	Johntá Austin; Hallgeir Rustan; Hermansen; Eriksen	StarGate; Austin^{[a]}	3:35
3.	"Cohiba" (featuring Fat Joe & Knox)	Sean Garrett; Joseph Cartagena; Scott Storch; Rene Pichardo	Storch; Garrett^{[b]}	3:43
4.	"One Shot"	Austin; Lester Mendez	Mendez; Austin^{[a]}	4:24
5.	"We Gon' Last"	Austin; Eriksen; Hermansen	StarGate; Austin^{[a]}	3:40
6.	"Don't Lie"	Sheppard Solomon; Fernando Garibay	Garibay; Solomon^{[b]}	3:27
7.	"Just a Friend"	Benjamin Franco; Jean Rodriguez; Frank Romano; James Scheffer	Jim Jonsin; Rodriguez^{[a]}	4:26
8.	"Fired Up"	Austin; Eriksen; Hermansen	StarGate; Austin^{[a]}	3:26
9.	"4 the 1"	Raymond Basora; Steve Morales; Dan Warner	Morales	3:44
10.	"Everytime I..."	Mario Vazquez; Kenneth Karlin; Tamara Savage; Durrell Scott; Carsten Shack	Soulshock & Karlin	4:01
11.	"How We Do It"	Antoine Collins; Brian Kennedy; Harvey Mason, Jr.; Steven Russell; Damon Thomas	The Underdogs; Kennedy^{[b]}; T-Wiz^{[b]}	3:36
12.	"She Got Me"	Garrett; Anthony Dent	Dent; Garrett^{[b]}	2:37
13.	"Like It or Not"	Basora; Camus Celli	Camus	3:06
14.	"We Supposed to Be"	Mason; Thomas	The Underdogs	3:25

Japan bonus track
No.	Title	Writer(s)	Producer(s)	Length
15.	"Ask About My Love"	Austin; Kasseem Dean; Kayla Shelton; Wayne Wells	Swizz Beatz; Austin^{[a]}	3:27

Notes

- ^{^a} denotes vocal producer
- ^{^b} denotes co-producer

== Charts ==
Chart (2006)	Peak position
French Albums (SNEP)	104
US Billboard 200	80
