= List of American Idol episodes =

American Idol is an American singing competition television series created by Simon Fuller; it is produced by Fremantle and 19 Entertainment. It began airing on Fox in the United States on June 11, 2002, and ended on April 7, 2016. The series moved to ABC with its sixteenth season which debuted on March 11, 2018. It started off as an addition to the Idols format based on the British series Pop Idol, and became one of the most successful shows in the history of American television. The concept of the series involves discovering recording stars from unsigned singing talents, with the winner determined by the viewers in America through telephones, Internet, and SMS text voting.

As of January 26, 2026, 734 episodes of American Idol have aired.

== Series overview ==
Season	Episodes	Originally released			Rank	Average viewers (in millions)
Season	Episodes	First released	Last released	Network	Rank	Average viewers (in millions)
1	25	June 11, 2002	September 4, 2002	Fox	—N/a	12.22 (Tuesday) / 11.62 (Wednesday)
2	40	January 21, 2003	May 21, 2003	Fox	5 (Tuesday) / 3 (Wednesday)	21.6 (Tuesday) / 21.9 (Wednesday)
3	44	January 19, 2004	May 26, 2004	Fox	1 (Tuesday) / 3 (Wednesday)	25.73 (Tuesday) / 24.31 (Wednesday)
4	43	January 18, 2005	May 25, 2005	Fox	1 (Tuesday) / 3 (Wednesday)	27.32 (Tuesday) / 26.07 (Wednesday)
5	41	January 17, 2006	May 24, 2006	Fox	1 (Tuesday) / 2 (Wednesday)	31.17 (Tuesday) / 30.16 (Wednesday)
6	41	January 16, 2007	May 23, 2007	Fox	2 (Tuesday) / 1 (Wednesday)	30.11 (Tuesday) / 30.58 (Wednesday)
7	42	January 15, 2008	May 21, 2008	Fox	1 (Tuesday) / 2 (Wednesday)	28.80 (Tuesday) / 27.81 (Wednesday)
8	40	January 13, 2009	May 20, 2009	Fox	2 (Tuesday) / 1 (Wednesday)	26.22 (Tuesday) / 26.48 (Wednesday)
9	43	January 12, 2010	May 26, 2010	Fox	1 (Tuesday) / 2 (Wednesday)	24.71 (Tuesday) / 23.46 (Wednesday)
10	39	January 19, 2011	May 25, 2011	Fox	1 (Wednesday) / 2 (Thursday)	25.86 (Wednesday) / 23.80 (Thursday)
11	40	January 18, 2012	May 23, 2012	Fox	2 (Wednesday) / 4 (Thursday)	19.81 (Wednesday) / 18.33 (Thursday)
12	37	January 16, 2013	May 16, 2013	Fox	6 (Wednesday) / 8 (Thursday)	15.04 (Wednesday) / 14.65 (Thursday)
13	39	January 15, 2014	May 21, 2014	Fox	17 (Wednesday) / 22 (Thursday)	11.94 (Wednesday) / 11.43 (Thursday)
14	30	January 7, 2015	May 13, 2015	Fox	41 (Wednesday) / 28 (Thursday)	10.31 (Wednesday) / 11.55 (Thursday)
15	24	January 6, 2016	April 7, 2016	Fox	19 (Wednesday) / 23 (Thursday)	11.52 (Wednesday) / 11.13 (Thursday)
16	19	March 11, 2018	May 21, 2018	ABC	33 (Sunday) / 32 (Monday)	9.31 (Sunday) / 9.45 (Monday)
17	19	March 3, 2019	May 19, 2019	ABC	34 (Sunday) / 45 (Monday)	8.88 (Sunday) / 8.00 (Monday)
18	16	February 16, 2020	May 17, 2020	ABC	31 (Sunday) / 28 (Monday)	8.34 (Sunday) / 8.54 (Monday)
19	19	February 14, 2021	May 23, 2021	ABC	25 (Sunday) / 39 (Monday)	7.42 (Sunday) / 6.24 (Monday)
20	20	February 27, 2022	May 22, 2022	ABC	25 (Sunday) / 28 (Monday)	7.29 (Sunday) / 6.99 (Monday)
21	20	February 19, 2023	May 21, 2023	ABC	20 (Sunday) / 32 (Monday)	6.92 (Sunday) / 6.06 (Monday)
22	18	February 18, 2024	May 19, 2024	ABC	TBA	TBA
23	19	March 2, 2025	May 18, 2025	ABC	TBA	TBA
24	16	January 26, 2026	May 11, 2026	ABC	TBA	TBA

== Episodes ==
=== Season 1 (2002) ===
No. overall	No. in season	Title	Original release date	Prod. code	U.S. viewers (millions)	Rating/share (18–49)
1	1	"Auditions"	June 11, 2002	1001	N/A	TBA
2	2	"Hollywood Week"	June 12, 2002	1002	N/A	TBA
3	3	"Top 30: Group 1"	June 18, 2002	1003	N/A	TBA
4	4	"Top 30: Group 1 results"	June 19, 2002	1004	N/A	TBA
5	5	"Top 30: Group 2"	June 25, 2002	1005	N/A	TBA
6	6	"Top 30: Group 2 results"	June 26, 2002	1006	N/A	TBA
7	7	"Top 30: Group 3"	July 2, 2002	1007	N/A	TBA
8	8	"Top 30: Group 3 results"	July 3, 2002	1008	N/A	TBA
9	9	"Wildcard Show"	July 10, 2002	1009	N/A	TBA
10	10	"Top 10 Perform"	July 16, 2002	1010	N/A	TBA
11	11	"Top 10 Results"	July 17, 2002	1011	N/A	TBA
12	12	"Top 8 Finalists"	July 23, 2002	1012	N/A	TBA
13	13	"Top 8 Results"	July 24, 2002	1013	N/A	TBA
14	14	"Top 7 Finalists"	July 30, 2002	1014	N/A	TBA
15	15	"Top 7 Results"	July 31, 2002	1015	N/A	TBA
16	16	"Top 6 Finalists"	August 6, 2002	1016	N/A	TBA
17	17	"Top 6 Results"	August 7, 2002	1017	N/A	TBA
18	18	"Top 5 Finalists"	August 13, 2002	1018	N/A	TBA
19	19	"Top 5 Results"	August 14, 2002	1019	N/A	TBA
20	20	"Top 4 Finalists"	August 20, 2002	1020	N/A	TBA
21	21	"Top 4 Results"	August 21, 2002	1021	N/A	TBA
22	22	"Top 3 Finalists"	August 27, 2002	1022	N/A	TBA
23	23	"Top 3 Results"	August 28, 2002	1023	N/A	TBA
24	24	"Top 2 Finalists"	September 3, 2002	1024	N/A	TBA
25	25	"American Idol Season 1 Finale"	September 4, 2002	1025	N/A	TBA

=== Season 2 (2003) ===
No. overall	No. in season	Title	Original release date	Prod. code	U.S. viewers (millions)	Rating/share (18–49)
26	1	"New York, Miami & Austin Auditions"	January 21, 2003	–	N/A	TBA
27	2	"Special: American Idol Revisited"	January 21, 2003	–	N/A	TBA
28	3	"Pasadena & Detroit Auditions"	January 22, 2003	–	N/A	TBA
29	4	"Atlanta & Nashville Auditions"	January 28, 2003	–	N/A	TBA
30	5	"Hollywood Week"	January 29, 2003	–	N/A	TBA
31	6	"Top 32: Group 1"	February 4, 2003	–	N/A	TBA
32	7	"Top 32: Group 1 results"	February 5, 2003	–	N/A	TBA
33	8	"Top 32: Group 2"	February 11, 2003	–	N/A	TBA
34	9	"Top 32: Group 2 results"	February 12, 2003	–	N/A	TBA
35	10	"Top 32: Group 3"	February 18, 2003	–	N/A	TBA
36	11	"Top 32: Group 3 results"	February 19, 2003	–	N/A	TBA
37	12	"Special: Best of the Worst"	February 19, 2003	–	N/A	TBA
38	13	"Top 32: Group 4"	February 25, 2003	–	N/A	TBA
39	14	"Top 32: Group 4 results"	February 26, 2003	–	N/A	TBA
40	15	"Wildcard Show"	March 4, 2003	–	N/A	TBA
41	16	"Wildcard Results"	March 5, 2003	–	N/A	TBA
42	17	"Top 12 Perform"	March 11, 2003	–	N/A	TBA
43	18	"Top 12 Results"	March 12, 2003	–	N/A	TBA
44	19	"Top 11 Perform"	March 18, 2003	–	N/A	TBA
45	20	"Top 11 Results"	March 19, 2003	–	N/A	TBA
46	21	"Top 10 Perform"	March 25, 2003	–	N/A	TBA
47	22	"Top 10 Results"	March 26, 2003	–	N/A	TBA
48	23	"Top 9 Perform"	April 1, 2003	–	N/A	TBA
49	24	"Top 9 Results"	April 2, 2003	–	N/A	TBA
50	25	"Top 8 Perform"	April 8, 2003	–	N/A	TBA
51	26	"Top 8 Results"	April 9, 2003	–	N/A	TBA
52	27	"Top 7 Perform"	April 15, 2003	–	N/A	TBA
53	28	"Top 7 Results"	April 16, 2003	–	N/A	TBA
54	29	"Special: Halfway Home"	April 21, 2003	–	N/A	TBA
55	30	"Top 6 Perform"	April 22, 2003	–	N/A	TBA
56	31	"Top 6 Results"	April 23, 2003	–	N/A	TBA
57	32	"Top 5 Perform"	April 29, 2003	–	N/A	TBA
58	33	"Top 5 Results"	April 30, 2003	–	N/A	TBA
59	34	"Top 4 Perform"	May 6, 2003	–	N/A	TBA
60	35	"Top 4 Results"	May 7, 2003	–	N/A	TBA
61	36	"Top 3 Perform"	May 13, 2003	–	N/A	TBA
62	37	"Top 3 Results"	May 14, 2003	–	N/A	TBA
63	38	"Top 2 Special"	May 19, 2003	–	N/A	TBA
64	39	"Top 2 Showdown"	May 20, 2003	–	N/A	TBA
65	40	"American Idol Season 2 Finale"	May 21, 2003	–	N/A	TBA

=== Season 3 (2004) ===
No. overall	No. in season	Title	Original release date	Prod. code	U.S. viewers (millions)	Rating/share (18–49)
66	1	"Audition episode: New York"	January 19, 2004	–	N/A	TBA
67	2	"Audition episode: Atlanta"	January 20, 2004	–	N/A	TBA
68	3	"Audition episode: Houston"	January 21, 2004	–	N/A	TBA
69	4	"Audition episode: Los Angeles and San Francisco"	January 27, 2004	–	N/A	TBA
70	5	"Audition episode: Hawaii"	January 28, 2004	–	N/A	TBA
71	6	"Audition episode: Road to Hollywood, Best and Worst of the Rest"	February 2, 2004	–	N/A	TBA
72	7	"Hollywood Week: Part 1"	February 3, 2004	–	N/A	TBA
73	8	"Hollywood Week: Part 2"	February 4, 2004	–	N/A	TBA
74	9	"Top 32: Group 1"	February 10, 2004	–	N/A	TBA
75	10	"Top 32: Group 1 Results"	February 11, 2004	–	N/A	TBA
76	11	"Top 32: Group 2"	February 17, 2004	–	N/A	TBA
77	12	"Top 32: Group 2 Results"	February 18, 2004	–	N/A	TBA
78	13	"Top 32: Group 3"	February 24, 2004	–	N/A	TBA
79	14	"Top 32: Group 3 Results"	February 25, 2004	–	N/A	TBA
80	15	"Special: Uncut, Uncensored and Untalented"	March 1, 2004	–	N/A	TBA
81	16	"Top 32: Group 4"	March 2, 2004	–	N/A	TBA
82	17	"Top 32: Group 4 Results"	March 3, 2004	–	N/A	TBA
83	18	"Wildcard"	March 9, 2004	–	N/A	TBA
84	19	"Wildcard Results"	March 10, 2004	–	N/A	TBA
85	20	"Top 12 Perform"	March 16, 2004	–	N/A	TBA
86	21	"Top 12 Results"	March 17, 2004	–	N/A	TBA
87	22	"Top 11 Perform"	March 23, 2004	–	N/A	TBA
88	23	"Top 11 Results"	March 24, 2004	–	N/A	TBA
89	24	"Top 10 Perform"	March 30, 2004	–	N/A	TBA
90	25	"Top 10 Results"	March 31, 2004	–	N/A	TBA
91	26	"Top 9 Perform"	April 6, 2004	–	N/A	TBA
92	27	"Top 9 Results"	April 7, 2004	–	N/A	TBA
93	28	"Top 8 Perform"	April 14, 2004	–	N/A	TBA
94	29	"Top 8 Results"	April 15, 2004	–	N/A	TBA
95	30	"Top 7 Perform"	April 20, 2004	–	N/A	TBA
96	31	"Top 7 Results"	April 21, 2004	–	N/A	TBA
97	32	"Top 6 Perform"	April 27, 2004	–	N/A	TBA
98	33	"Top 6 Results"	April 28, 2004	–	N/A	TBA
99	34	"Special: The Final Five"	May 3, 2004	–	N/A	TBA
100	35	"Top 5 Perform"	May 4, 2004	–	N/A	TBA
101	36	"Top 5 Results"	May 5, 2004	–	N/A	TBA
102	37	"Top 4 Perform"	May 11, 2004	–	N/A	TBA
103	38	"Top 4 Results"	May 12, 2004	–	N/A	TBA
104	39	"Special: The Final Three"	May 17, 2004	–	N/A	TBA
105	40	"Top 3 Perform"	May 18, 2004	–	N/A	TBA
106	41	"Top 3 Results"	May 19, 2004	–	N/A	TBA
107	42	"Special: American Idol: The Phenomenon"	May 23, 2004	–	N/A	TBA
108	43	"Top 2 Perform (Finale)"	May 25, 2004	–	N/A	TBA
109	44	"American Idol Season 3 Finale"	May 26, 2004	–	N/A	TBA

=== Season 4 (2005) ===
No. overall	No. in season	Title	Original release date	Prod. code	U.S. viewers (millions)	Rating/share (18–49)
110	1	"Washington D.C. Auditions"	January 18, 2005	–	N/A	TBA
111	2	"St. Louis, Missouri Auditions"	January 19, 2005	–	N/A	TBA
112	3	"New Orleans, Louisiana Auditions"	January 25, 2005	–	N/A	TBA
113	4	"Las Vegas, Nevada Auditions"	January 26, 2005	–	N/A	TBA
114	5	"Cleveland, Ohio & Orlando, Florida Auditions"	February 1, 2005	–	N/A	TBA
115	6	"San Francisco, California Auditions"	February 2, 2005	–	N/A	TBA
116	7	"Hollywood Day 1"	February 8, 2005	–	N/A	TBA
117	8	"Hollywood Day 2"	February 9, 2005	–	N/A	TBA
118	9	"Hollywood Day 3"	February 15, 2005	–	N/A	TBA
119	10	"Hollywood Day 4"	February 16, 2005	–	N/A	TBA
120	11	"Top 12 Men Perform"	February 21, 2005	–	N/A	TBA
121	12	"Top 12 Women Perform"	February 22, 2005	–	N/A	TBA
122	13	"Top 24 Results"	February 23, 2005	–	N/A	TBA
123	14	"Top 10 Men Perform"	February 28, 2005	–	N/A	TBA
124	15	"Top 10 Women Perform"	March 1, 2005	–	N/A	TBA
125	16	"Top 20 Results"	March 2, 2005	–	N/A	TBA
126	17	"Top 8 Men Perform"	March 7, 2005	–	N/A	TBA
127	18	"Top 8 Women Perform"	March 8, 2005	–	N/A	TBA
128	19	"Top 16 Results"	March 9, 2005	–	N/A	TBA
129	20	"Top 12 Perform"	March 15, 2005	–	N/A	TBA
130	21	"Top 12 Results"	March 16, 2005	–	N/A	TBA
131	22	"Top 11 Perform"	March 22, 2005	–	N/A	TBA
132	23	"Top 11 Finalists Repeat Special"	March 23, 2005	–	N/A	TBA
133	24	"Top 11 Results"	March 24, 2005	–	N/A	TBA
134	25	"Top 10 Perform"	March 29, 2005	–	N/A	TBA
135	26	"Top 10 Results"	March 30, 2005	–	N/A	TBA
136	27	"Top 9 Perform"	April 5, 2005	–	N/A	TBA
137	28	"Top 9 Results"	April 6, 2005	–	N/A	TBA
138	29	"Top 8 Perform"	April 12, 2005	–	N/A	TBA
139	30	"Top 8 Results"	April 13, 2005	–	N/A	TBA
140	31	"Top 7 Perform"	April 19, 2005	–	N/A	TBA
141	32	"Top 7 Results"	April 20, 2005	–	N/A	TBA
142	33	"Top 6 Perform"	April 26, 2005	–	N/A	TBA
143	34	"Top 6 Results"	April 27, 2005	–	N/A	TBA
144	35	"Top 5 Perform"	May 3, 2005	–	N/A	TBA
145	36	"Top 5 Results"	May 4, 2005	–	N/A	TBA
146	37	"Top 4 Perform"	May 10, 2005	–	N/A	TBA
147	38	"Top 4 Results"	May 11, 2005	–	N/A	TBA
148	39	"Top 3 Perform"	May 17, 2005	–	N/A	TBA
149	40	"Top 3 Results"	May 18, 2005	–	N/A	TBA
150	41	"Special: American Idol Presents The World's Worst Auditions"	May 19, 2005	–	N/A	TBA
151	42	"Top 2 Perform"	May 24, 2005	–	N/A	TBA
152	43	"American Idol Season 4 Finale"	May 25, 2005	–	N/A	TBA

=== Season 5 (2006) ===
No. overall	No. in season	Title	Original release date	Prod. code	U.S. viewers (millions)	Rating/share (18–49)
153	1	"Chicago, Illinois Auditions"	January 17, 2006	–	N/A	TBA
154	2	"Denver, Colorado Auditions"	January 18, 2006	–	N/A	TBA
155	3	"Greensboro, North Carolina Auditions"	January 24, 2006	–	N/A	TBA
156	4	"San Francisco, California Auditions"	January 25, 2006	–	N/A	TBA
157	5	"Las Vegas, Nevada Auditions"	January 31, 2006	–	N/A	TBA
158	6	"Austin, Texas Auditions"	February 1, 2006	–	N/A	TBA
159	7	"Boston, Massachusetts Auditions"	February 7, 2006	–	N/A	TBA
160	8	"Hollywood Round 1"	February 8, 2006	–	N/A	TBA
161	9	"Hollywood Round 2"	February 14, 2006	–	N/A	TBA
162	10	"Top 24 Semifinalists Revealed"	February 15, 2006	–	N/A	TBA
163	11	"Top 12 Women Perform"	February 21, 2006	–	N/A	TBA
164	12	"Top 12 Men Perform"	February 22, 2006	–	N/A	TBA
165	13	"Top 24 Results"	February 23, 2006	–	N/A	TBA
166	14	"Top 10 Women Perform"	February 28, 2006	–	N/A	TBA
167	15	"Top 10 Men Perform"	March 1, 2006	–	N/A	TBA
168	16	"Top 16 Semifinalists Revealed"	March 2, 2006	–	N/A	TBA
169	17	"Top 8 Women Perform"	March 7, 2006	–	N/A	TBA
170	18	"Top 8 Men Perform"	March 8, 2006	–	N/A	TBA
171	19	"Top 12 Finalists Revealed"	March 9, 2006	–	N/A	TBA
172	20	"Stevie Wonder Theme"	March 14, 2006	–	N/A	TBA
173	21	"Top 12 Results"	March 15, 2006	–	N/A	TBA
174	22	"1950s Theme"	March 21, 2006	–	N/A	TBA
175	23	"Top 11 Results"	March 22, 2006	–	N/A	TBA
176	24	"Top 10 Perform"	March 28, 2006	–	N/A	TBA
177	25	"Top 10 Results"	March 29, 2006	–	N/A	TBA
178	26	"Top 9 Perform"	April 4, 2006	–	N/A	TBA
179	27	"Top 9 Results"	April 5, 2006	–	N/A	TBA
180	28	"Top 8 Perform"	April 11, 2006	–	N/A	TBA
181	29	"Top 8 Results"	April 12, 2006	–	N/A	TBA
182	30	"Top 7 Perform"	April 18, 2006	–	N/A	TBA
183	31	"Top 7 Results"	April 19, 2006	–	N/A	TBA
184	32	"Top 6 Perform"	April 25, 2006	–	N/A	TBA
185	33	"Top 6 Results"	April 26, 2006	–	N/A	TBA
186	34	"Top 5 Perform"	May 2, 2006	–	N/A	TBA
187	35	"Top 5 Results"	May 3, 2006	–	N/A	TBA
188	36	"Top 4 Perform"	May 9, 2006	–	N/A	TBA
189	37	"Top 4 Results"	May 10, 2006	–	N/A	TBA
190	38	"Top 3 Perform"	May 16, 2006	–	N/A	TBA
191	39	"Top 3 Results"	May 17, 2006	–	N/A	TBA
192	40	"Top 2 Perform"	May 23, 2006	–	N/A	TBA
193	41	"American Idol Season 5 Finale"	May 24, 2006	–	N/A	TBA

=== Season 6 (2007) ===
No. overall	No. in season	Title	Original release date	Prod. code	U.S. viewers (millions)	Rating/share (18–49)
194	1	"Minneapolis, Minnesota Auditions"	January 16, 2007	601 & 602	N/A	TBA
195	2	"Seattle, Washington Auditions"	January 17, 2007	–	N/A	TBA
196	3	"Memphis, Tennessee Auditions"	January 23, 2007	–	N/A	TBA
197	4	"New York City, New York Auditions"	January 24, 2007	–	N/A	TBA
198	5	"Birmingham, Alabama Auditions"	January 30, 2007	–	N/A	TBA
199	6	"Los Angeles, California Auditions"	January 31, 2007	–	N/A	TBA
200	7	"San Antonio, Texas Auditions"	February 6, 2007	–	N/A	TBA
201	8	"Best of the Rest Auditions"	February 7, 2007	–	N/A	TBA
202	9	"Hollywood Round"	February 13, 2007	–	N/A	TBA
203	10	"Final 24 Verdict"	February 14, 2007	–	N/A	TBA
204	11	"Top 12 Men Perform"	February 20, 2007	–	N/A	TBA
205	12	"Top 12 Women Perform"	February 21, 2007	–	N/A	TBA
206	13	"Top 24 Results"	February 22, 2007	–	N/A	TBA
207	14	"Top 10 Men Perform"	February 27, 2007	–	N/A	TBA
208	15	"Top 10 Women Perform"	February 28, 2007	–	N/A	TBA
209	16	"Top 20 Results"	March 1, 2007	–	N/A	TBA
210	17	"Top 8 Men Perform"	March 6, 2007	–	N/A	TBA
211	18	"Top 8 Women Perform"	March 7, 2007	–	N/A	TBA
212	19	"Top 12 Revealed"	March 8, 2007	–	N/A	TBA
213	20	"Top 12 Perform"	March 13, 2007	–	N/A	TBA
214	21	"Top 12 Results"	March 14, 2007	–	N/A	TBA
215	22	"Top 11 Perform"	March 20, 2007	–	N/A	TBA
216	23	"Top 11 Results"	March 21, 2007	–	N/A	TBA
217	24	"Top 10 Perform"	March 27, 2007	–	N/A	TBA
218	25	"Top 10 Results"	March 28, 2007	–	N/A	TBA
219	26	"Top 9 Perform"	April 3, 2007	–	N/A	TBA
220	27	"Top 9 Results"	April 4, 2007	–	N/A	TBA
221	28	"Top 8 Perform"	April 10, 2007	–	N/A	TBA
222	29	"Top 8 Results"	April 11, 2007	–	N/A	TBA
223	30	"Top 7 Perform"	April 17, 2007	–	N/A	TBA
224	31	"Top 7 Results"	April 18, 2007	–	N/A	TBA
225	32	"Top 6 Perform"	April 24, 2007	–	N/A	TBA
226	33	"Idol Gives Back"	April 25, 2007	–	N/A	TBA
227	34	"Top 6 Perform Again"	May 1, 2007	–	N/A	TBA
228	35	"Top 6 Results"	May 2, 2007	–	N/A	TBA
229	36	"Top 4 Perform"	May 8, 2007	–	N/A	TBA
230	37	"Top 4 Results"	May 9, 2007	–	N/A	TBA
231	38	"Top 3 Perform"	May 15, 2007	–	N/A	TBA
232	39	"Top 3 Results"	May 16, 2007	–	N/A	TBA
233	40	"Top 2 Perform"	May 22, 2007	–	N/A	TBA
234	41	"American Idol Season 6 Finale"	May 23, 2007	–	N/A	TBA

=== Season 7 (2008) ===
No. overall	No. in season	Title	Original release date	Prod. code	U.S. viewers (millions)	Rating/share (18–49)
235	1	"Philadelphia, Pennsylvania Auditions"	January 15, 2008	701 & 702	N/A	TBA
236	2	"Dallas, Texas Auditions"	January 16, 2008	703 & 704	N/A	TBA
237	3	"San Diego, California Auditions"	January 22, 2008	705	N/A	TBA
238	4	"Charleston, South Carolina Auditions"	January 23, 2008	706	N/A	TBA
239	5	"Omaha, Nebraska Auditions"	January 29, 2008	707	N/A	TBA
240	6	"Miami, Florida Auditions"	January 30, 2008	708	N/A	TBA
241	7	"Atlanta, Georgia Auditions"	February 5, 2008	709	N/A	TBA
242	8	"Best of the Rest Auditions"	February 6, 2008	710	N/A	TBA
243	9	"Hollywood Round"	February 12, 2008	711 & 712	N/A	TBA
244	10	"Top 24 Chosen"	February 13, 2008	713	N/A	TBA
245	11	"Top 12 Men Perform"	February 19, 2008	714 & 715	N/A	TBA
246	12	"Top 12 Women Perform"	February 20, 2008	716 & 717	N/A	TBA
247	13	"Top 24 Results"	February 21, 2008	714A – 717A	N/A	TBA
248	14	"Top 10 Men Perform"	February 26, 2008	718	N/A	TBA
249	15	"Top 10 Women Perform"	February 27, 2008	719	N/A	TBA
250	16	"Top 20 Results"	February 28, 2008	718A – 719A	N/A	TBA
251	17	"Top 8 Men Perform"	March 4, 2008	720	N/A	TBA
252	18	"Top 8 Women Perform"	March 5, 2008	721	N/A	TBA
253	19	"Top 12 Revealed"	March 6, 2008	720A – 721A	N/A	TBA
254	20	"Top 12 Perform"	March 11, 2008	722 & 723	N/A	TBA
255	21	"Top 12 Results"	March 12, 2008	722A – 723A	N/A	TBA
256	22	"Top 11 Perform"	March 18, 2008	724 & 725	N/A	TBA
257	23	"Top 11 Results"	March 19, 2008	724A – 725A	N/A	TBA
258	24	"Top 10 Perform"	March 25, 2008	726	N/A	TBA
259	25	"Top 10 Results"	March 26, 2008	726A	N/A	TBA
260	26	"Top 9 Perform"	April 1, 2008	727	N/A	TBA
261	27	"Top 9 Results"	April 2, 2008	727A	N/A	TBA
262	28	"Top 8 Perform"	April 8, 2008	728	N/A	TBA
263	29	"Idol Gives Back"	April 9, 2008	728A	N/A	TBA
264	30	"Top 8 Results"	April 10, 2008	728B	N/A	TBA
265	31	"Top 7 Perform"	April 15, 2008	729	N/A	TBA
266	32	"Top 7 Results"	April 16, 2008	729A	N/A	TBA
267	33	"Top 6 Perform"	April 22, 2008	730	N/A	TBA
268	34	"Top 6 Results"	April 23, 2008	730A	N/A	TBA
269	35	"Top 5 Perform"	April 29, 2008	731	N/A	TBA
270	36	"Top 5 Results"	April 30, 2008	731A	N/A	TBA
271	37	"Top 4 Perform"	May 6, 2008	732	N/A	TBA
272	38	"Top 4 Results"	May 7, 2008	732A	N/A	TBA
273	39	"Top 3 Perform"	May 13, 2008	733	N/A	TBA
274	40	"Top 3 Results"	May 14, 2008	733A	N/A	TBA
275	41	"Top 2 Perform"	May 20, 2008	734	N/A	TBA
276	42	"American Idol Season 7 Finale"	May 21, 2008	735 & 736	N/A	TBA

=== Season 8 (2009) ===
No. overall	No. in season	Title	Original release date	Prod. code	U.S. viewers (millions)	Rating/share (18–49)
277	1	"Phoenix, Arizona Auditions"	January 13, 2009	801 & 802	N/A	TBA
278	2	"Kansas City, Missouri Auditions"	January 14, 2009	803 & 804	N/A	TBA
279	3	"San Francisco, California Auditions"	January 20, 2009	805	N/A	TBA
280	4	"Louisville, Kentucky Auditions"	January 21, 2009	806	N/A	TBA
281	5	"Jacksonville, Florida Auditions"	January 27, 2009	807	N/A	TBA
282	6	"Salt Lake City, Utah Auditions"	January 28, 2009	808	N/A	TBA
283	7	"New York, New York and San Juan, Puerto Rico Auditions"	January 29, 2009	809	N/A	TBA
284	8	"Hollywood Round #1"	February 3, 2009	810	N/A	TBA
285	9	"Hollywood Round #2"	February 4, 2009	811	N/A	TBA
286	10	"Hollywood Round #3"	February 10, 2009	812	N/A	TBA
287	11	"Hollywood Round #4: Top 36 Chosen"	February 11, 2009	813 & 814	N/A	TBA
288	12	"Group 1 Semi-finalists Perform"	February 17, 2009	815 & 816	N/A	TBA
289	13	"Group 1 Results Show"	February 18, 2009	815A – 816A	N/A	TBA
290	14	"Group 2 Semi-finalists Perform"	February 25, 2009	817 & 818	N/A	TBA
291	15	"Group 2 Results Show"	February 26, 2009	817A – 818A	N/A	TBA
292	16	"Group 3 Semi-finalists Perform"	March 3, 2009	819 & 820	N/A	TBA
293	17	"Group 3 Results Show"	March 4, 2009	819A – 820A	N/A	TBA
294	18	"Wild Card Round"	March 5, 2009	819B – 820B	N/A	TBA
295	19	"Top 13 Perform"	March 10, 2009	821 & 822	N/A	TBA
296	20	"Top 13 Results"	March 11, 2009	821A – 822A	N/A	TBA
297	21	"Top 11 Perform"	March 17, 2009	823 & 824	N/A	TBA
298	22	"Top 11 Results"	March 18, 2009	823A – 824A	N/A	TBA
299	23	"Top 10 Perform"	March 25, 2009	825 & 826	N/A	TBA
300	24	"Top 10 Results"	March 26, 2009	825A – 826A	N/A	TBA
301	25	"Top 9 Perform"	March 31, 2009	827	N/A	TBA
302	26	"Top 9 Results"	April 1, 2009	827A	N/A	TBA
303	27	"Top 8 Perform"	April 7, 2009	828	N/A	TBA
304	28	"Top 8 Results"	April 8, 2009	828A	N/A	TBA
305	29	"Top 7 Perform"	April 14, 2009	829	N/A	TBA
306	30	"Top 7 Results"	April 15, 2009	829A	N/A	TBA
307	31	"Top 7 Perform Again"	April 21, 2009	830	N/A	TBA
308	32	"Top 7 Results"	April 22, 2009	830A	N/A	TBA
309	33	"Top 5 Perform"	April 28, 2009	831	N/A	TBA
310	34	"Top 5 Results"	April 29, 2009	831A	N/A	TBA
311	35	"Top 4 Perform"	May 5, 2009	832	N/A	TBA
312	36	"Top 4 Results"	May 6, 2009	832A	N/A	TBA
313	37	"Top 3 Perform"	May 12, 2009	833	N/A	TBA
314	38	"Top 3 Results"	May 13, 2009	833A	N/A	TBA
315	39	"Top 2 Perform (Pre-Finale)"	May 19, 2009	834	N/A	TBA
316	40	"Season 8 Finale"	May 20, 2009	834A	N/A	TBA

=== Season 9 (2010) ===
No. overall	No. in season	Title	Original release date	Prod. code	U.S. viewers (millions)	Rating/share (18–49)
317	1	"Boston, Massachusetts Auditions"	January 12, 2010	901 & 902	N/A	TBA
318	2	"Atlanta, Georgia Auditions"	January 13, 2010	903	N/A	TBA
319	3	"Chicago, Illinois Auditions"	January 19, 2010	904	N/A	TBA
320	4	"Orlando, Florida Auditions"	January 20, 2010	905	N/A	TBA
321	5	"Los Angeles, California Auditions"	January 26, 2010	906	N/A	TBA
322	6	"Dallas, Texas Auditions"	January 27, 2010	907	N/A	TBA
323	7	"Denver, Colorado Auditions"	February 2, 2010	908	N/A	TBA
324	8	"The Road to Hollywood"	February 3, 2010	909	N/A	TBA
325	9	"Hollywood Round: Part 1"	February 9, 2010	910	N/A	TBA
326	10	"Hollywood Round: Part 2"	February 10, 2010	911	N/A	TBA
327	11	"Hollywood Round: Part 3"	February 16, 2010	912	N/A	TBA
328	12	"Hollywood Round: Part 4"	February 17, 2010	913	N/A	TBA
329	13	"Top 12 Female Perform"	February 23, 2010	914	N/A	TBA
330	14	"Top 12 Male Perform"	February 24, 2010	915	N/A	TBA
331	15	"Top 24 Results"	February 25, 2010	916	N/A	TBA
332	16	"Top 10 Male Perform"	March 2, 2010	917	N/A	TBA
333	17	"Top 10 Female Perform"	March 3, 2010	918	N/A	TBA
334	18	"Top 20 Results"	March 4, 2010	919	N/A	TBA
335	19	"Top 8 Female Perform"	March 9, 2010	920	N/A	TBA
336	20	"Top 8 Male Perform"	March 10, 2010	921	N/A	TBA
337	21	"Top 16 Results"	March 11, 2010	922	N/A	TBA
338	22	"Top 12 Perform"	March 16, 2010	923	N/A	TBA
339	23	"Top 12 Results"	March 17, 2010	924	N/A	TBA
340	24	"Top 11 Perform"	March 23, 2010	925	N/A	TBA
341	25	"Top 11 Results"	March 24, 2010	926	N/A	TBA
342	26	"Top 10 Perform"	March 30, 2010	927	N/A	TBA
343	27	"Top 10 Results"	March 31, 2010	928	N/A	TBA
344	28	"Top 9 Perform"	April 6, 2010	929	N/A	TBA
345	29	"Top 9 Results"	April 7, 2010	930	N/A	TBA
346	30	"Top 9 Perform Again"	April 13, 2010	931	N/A	TBA
347	31	"Top 9 Results"	April 14, 2010	932	N/A	TBA
348	32	"Top 7 Perform"	April 20, 2010	933	N/A	TBA
349	33	"Idol Gives Back & Top 7 Results"	April 21, 2010	934	N/A	TBA
350	34	"Top 6 Perform"	April 27, 2010	935	N/A	TBA
351	35	"Top 6 Results"	April 28, 2010	936	N/A	TBA
352	36	"Top 5 Perform"	May 4, 2010	937	N/A	TBA
353	37	"Top 5 Results"	May 5, 2010	938	N/A	TBA
354	38	"Top 4 Perform"	May 11, 2010	939	N/A	TBA
355	39	"Top 4 Results"	May 12, 2010	940	N/A	TBA
356	40	"Top 3 Perform"	May 18, 2010	941	N/A	TBA
357	41	"Top 3 Results"	May 19, 2010	942	N/A	TBA
358	42	"Top 2 Perform (Pre-Finale)"	May 25, 2010	943	N/A	TBA
359	43	"Top 2 Results (Finale)"	May 26, 2010	944	N/A	TBA

=== Season 10 (2011) ===
No. overall	No. in season	Title	Original release date	Prod. code	U.S. viewers (millions)	Rating/share (18–49)
360	1	"East Rutherford, New Jersey Auditions"	January 19, 2011	1001 & 1002	N/A	TBA
361	2	"New Orleans, Louisiana Auditions"	January 20, 2011	1003	N/A	TBA
362	3	"Milwaukee, Wisconsin Auditions"	January 26, 2011	1004	N/A	TBA
363	4	"Nashville, Tennessee Auditions"	January 27, 2011	1005	N/A	TBA
364	5	"Austin, Texas Auditions"	February 2, 2011	1006	N/A	TBA
365	6	"Los Angeles, California Auditions"	February 3, 2011	1007	N/A	TBA
366	7	"San Francisco, California Auditions"	February 9, 2011	1008	N/A	TBA
367	8	"Hollywood Round: Part 1"	February 10, 2011	1009	N/A	TBA
368	9	"Hollywood Round: Part 2"	February 16, 2011	1010	N/A	TBA
369	10	"Hollywood Round: Part 3"	February 17, 2011	1011	N/A	TBA
370	11	"Las Vegas Round/Top 24 Chosen: Part 1"	February 23, 2011	1012	N/A	TBA
371	12	"Top 24 Chosen: Part 2"	February 24, 2011	1013	N/A	TBA
372	13	"Top 12 Males Perform"	March 1, 2011	1014	N/A	TBA
373	14	"Top 12 Females Perform"	March 2, 2011	1015	N/A	TBA
374	15	"Top 24 Results"	March 3, 2011	1016	N/A	TBA
375	16	"Top 13 Perform"	March 9, 2011	1017	N/A	TBA
376	17	"Top 13 Results"	March 10, 2011	1018	N/A	TBA
377	18	"Top 12 Perform"	March 16, 2011	1019	N/A	TBA
378	19	"Top 12 Results"	March 17, 2011	1020	N/A	TBA
379	20	"Top 11 Perform"	March 23, 2011	1021	N/A	TBA
380	21	"Top 11 Results"	March 24, 2011	1022	N/A	TBA
381	22	"Top 11 Perform Again"	March 30, 2011	1023	N/A	TBA
382	23	"Top 11 Results"	March 31, 2011	1024	N/A	TBA
383	24	"Top 9 Perform"	April 6, 2011	ID-1028	N/A	TBA
384	25	"Top 9 Results"	April 7, 2011	ID2-1028A	N/A	TBA
385	26	"Top 8 Perform"	April 13, 2011	ID-1029	N/A	TBA
386	27	"Top 8 Results"	April 14, 2011	ID2-1029A	N/A	TBA
387	28	"Top 7 Perform"	April 20, 2011	ID-1030	N/A	TBA
388	29	"Top 7 Results"	April 21, 2011	ID2-1030A	N/A	TBA
389	30	"Top 6 Perform"	April 27, 2011	TBA	N/A	TBA
390	31	"Top 6 Results"	April 28, 2011	TBA	N/A	TBA
391	32	"Top 5 Perform"	May 4, 2011	TBA	N/A	TBA
392	33	"Top 5 Results"	May 5, 2011	TBA	N/A	TBA
393	34	"Top 4 Perform"	May 11, 2011	TBA	N/A	TBA
394	35	"Top 4 Results"	May 12, 2011	TBA	N/A	TBA
395	36	"Top 3 Perform"	May 18, 2011	TBA	N/A	TBA
396	37	"Top 3 Results"	May 19, 2011	TBA	N/A	TBA
397	38	"Top 2 Perform (Pre-Finale)"	May 24, 2011	TBA	N/A	TBA
398	39	"Top 2 Results (Finale)"	May 25, 2011	TBA	N/A	TBA

=== Season 11 (2012) ===
No. overall	No. in season	Title	Original release date	Prod. code	U.S. viewers (millions)	Rating/share (18–49)
399	1	"Savannah Auditions"	January 18, 2012	1101 & 1102	N/A	TBA
400	2	"Pittsburgh Auditions"	January 19, 2012	1103	N/A	TBA
401	3	"San Diego Auditions"	January 22, 2012	1104	N/A	TBA
402	4	"Aspen Auditions"	January 25, 2012	1105	N/A	TBA
403	5	"Galveston Auditions"	January 26, 2012	1106	N/A	TBA
404	6	"Portland Auditions"	February 1, 2012	1107	N/A	TBA
405	7	"St. Louis Auditions"	February 2, 2012	1108	N/A	TBA
406	8	"Hollywood Round, Part 1"	February 8, 2012	1109	N/A	TBA
407	9	"Hollywood Round, Part 2"	February 9, 2012	1110	N/A	TBA
408	10	"Hollywood Round, Part 3"	February 15, 2012	1111	N/A	TBA
409	11	"Las Vegas Round"	February 16, 2012	1112	N/A	TBA
410	12	"Final Judgement, Part 1"	February 22, 2012	1115	N/A	TBA
411	13	"Final Judgement, Part 2"	February 23, 2012	1117	N/A	TBA
412	14	"Top 13 Boys Perform"	February 28, 2012	1118	N/A	TBA
413	15	"Top 12 Girls Perform"	February 29, 2012	1119	N/A	TBA
414	16	"Top 25 Results"	March 1, 2012	1120	N/A	TBA
415	17	"Top 13 Perform"	March 7, 2012	1121	N/A	TBA
416	18	"Top 13 Results"	March 8, 2012	1122	N/A	TBA
417	19	"Top 11 Perform"	March 14, 2012	1123	N/A	TBA
418	20	"Top 11 Results"	March 15, 2012	1124	N/A	TBA
419	21	"Top 10 Perform"	March 21, 2012	1125	N/A	TBA
420	22	"Top 10 Results"	March 22, 2012	1126	N/A	TBA
421	23	"Top 9 Perform"	March 28, 2012	1127	N/A	TBA
422	24	"Top 9 Results"	March 29, 2012	1128	N/A	TBA
423	25	"Top 8 Perform"	April 4, 2012	1129	N/A	TBA
424	26	"Top 8 Results"	April 5, 2012	1130	N/A	TBA
425	27	"Top 7 Perform"	April 11, 2012	1131	N/A	TBA
426	28	"Top 7 Results"	April 12, 2012	1132	N/A	TBA
427	29	"Top 7 Perform Again"	April 18, 2012	1133	N/A	TBA
428	30	"Top 7 Results Again"	April 19, 2012	1134	N/A	TBA
429	31	"Top 6 Perform"	April 25, 2012	1135	N/A	TBA
430	32	"Top 6 Results"	April 26, 2012	1136	N/A	TBA
431	33	"Top 5 Perform"	May 2, 2012	1137	N/A	TBA
432	34	"Top 5 Results"	May 3, 2012	1138	N/A	TBA
433	35	"Top 4 Perform"	May 9, 2012	1139	N/A	TBA
434	36	"Top 4 Results"	May 10, 2012	1140	N/A	TBA
435	37	"Top 3 Perform"	May 16, 2012	1141	N/A	TBA
436	38	"Top 3 Results"	May 17, 2012	1142	N/A	TBA
437	39	"Top 2 Perform (Pre-Finale)"	May 22, 2012	1143	N/A	TBA
438	40	"Top 2 Results (Finale)"	May 23, 2012	1144	N/A	TBA

=== Season 12 (2013) ===
No. overall	No. in season	Title	Original release date	Prod. code	U.S. viewers (millions)	Rating/share (18–49)
439	1	"New York City Auditions"	January 16, 2013	1201	N/A	TBA
440	2	"Chicago Auditions"	January 17, 2013	1202	N/A	TBA
441	3	"Charlotte Auditions"	January 23, 2013	1203	N/A	TBA
442	4	"New Orleans Auditions"	January 24, 2013	1204	N/A	TBA
443	5	"San Antonio & Los Angeles Auditions"	January 30, 2013	1205 & 1206	N/A	TBA
444	6	"Oklahoma City Auditions"	January 31, 2013	1207	N/A	TBA
445	7	"Hollywood Round Part 1"	February 6, 2013	1208	N/A	TBA
446	8	"Hollywood Round Part 2"	February 7, 2013	1209	N/A	TBA
447	9	"Hollywood Round Part 3"	February 13, 2013	1210	N/A	TBA
448	10	"Hollywood Round Part 4"	February 14, 2013	1211	N/A	TBA
449	11	"Las Vegas, Girls Perform"	February 20, 2013	1212	N/A	TBA
450	12	"Las Vegas, Guys Perform"	February 21, 2013	1213	N/A	TBA
451	13	"Las Vegas, Girls Perform 2"	February 27, 2013	1214	N/A	TBA
452	14	"Las Vegas, Guys Perform 2"	February 28, 2013	1215	N/A	TBA
453	15	"Semifinalists Girls Perform"	March 5, 2013	1216	N/A	TBA
454	16	"Semifinalists Boys Perform"	March 6, 2013	1217	N/A	TBA
455	17	"Finalists Chosen"	March 7, 2013	1218	N/A	TBA
456	18	"Top 10 Perform"	March 13, 2013	1219	N/A	TBA
457	19	"Top 10 Results"	March 14, 2013	1220	N/A	TBA
458	20	"Top 9 Perform"	March 20, 2013	1221	N/A	TBA
459	21	"Top 9 Results"	March 21, 2013	1222	N/A	TBA
460	22	"Top 8 Perform"	March 27, 2013	1223	N/A	TBA
461	23	"Top 8 Results"	March 28, 2013	1224	N/A	TBA
462	24	"Top 7 Perform"	April 3, 2013	1225	N/A	TBA
463	25	"Top 7 Results"	April 4, 2013	1226	N/A	TBA
464	26	"Top 6 Perform"	April 10, 2013	1227	N/A	TBA
465	27	"Top 6 Results"	April 11, 2013	1228	N/A	TBA
466	28	"Top 5 Perform"	April 17, 2013	1229	N/A	TBA
467	29	"Top 5 Results"	April 18, 2013	1230	N/A	TBA
468	30	"Top 4 Perform"	April 24, 2013	1231	N/A	TBA
469	31	"Top 4 Results"	April 25, 2013	1232	N/A	TBA
470	32	"Top 4 Perform Again"	May 1, 2013	1233	N/A	TBA
471	33	"Top 4 Results Again"	May 2, 2013	1234	N/A	TBA
472	34	"Top 3 Perform"	May 8, 2013	1235	N/A	TBA
473	35	"Top 3 Results"	May 9, 2013	1236	N/A	TBA
474	36	"Top 2 Perform (Pre-Finale)"	May 15, 2013	1237	N/A	TBA
475	37	"Top 2 Results (Finale)"	May 16, 2013	1238	N/A	TBA

=== Season 13 (2014) ===
No. overall	No. in season	Title	Original release date	Prod. code	U.S. viewers (millions)	Rating/share (18–49)
476	1	"Boston & Austin Auditions"	January 15, 2014	1301 & 1302	N/A	TBA
477	2	"Austin & San Francisco Auditions"	January 16, 2014	1303 & 1304	N/A	TBA
478	3	"Detroit Auditions"	January 22, 2014	1305 & 1306	N/A	TBA
479	4	"Atlanta Auditions"	January 23, 2014	1307	N/A	TBA
480	5	"Salt Lake City Auditions"	January 29, 2014	1308 & 1309	N/A	TBA
481	6	"Omaha Auditions"	January 30, 2014	1310	N/A	TBA
482	7	"Hollywood or Home"	February 5, 2014	1311 & 1312	N/A	TBA
483	8	"Hollywood Round, Week #1"	February 6, 2014	1313	N/A	TBA
484	9	"Hollywood Round, Week #2"	February 12, 2014	1314 & 1315	N/A	TBA
485	10	"Hollywood Round, Week #3"	February 13, 2014	1316	N/A	TBA
486	11	"Rush Week: Girls' Night"	February 18, 2014	1317 & 1318	N/A	TBA
487	12	"Rush Week: Guys' Night"	February 19, 2014	1319 & 1320	N/A	TBA
488	13	"Rush Week: Meet Your Finalists"	February 20, 2014	1317A – 1320A	N/A	TBA
489	14	"Top 13 Perform"	February 26, 2014	1321 & 1322	N/A	TBA
490	15	"Top 13 Results"	February 27, 2014	1321A & 1322A	N/A	TBA
491	16	"Top 12 Perform"	March 5, 2014	1323 & 1324	N/A	TBA
492	17	"Top 12 Results"	March 6, 2014	1323A & 1324A	N/A	TBA
493	18	"Top 11 Perform"	March 12, 2014	1325 & 1326	N/A	TBA
494	19	"Top 11 Results"	March 13, 2014	1325A & 1326A	N/A	TBA
495	20	"Top 10 Perform"	March 19, 2014	1327 & 1328	N/A	TBA
496	21	"Top 10 Results"	March 20, 2014	1327A & 1328A	N/A	TBA
497	22	"Top 9 Perform"	March 26, 2014	1329 & 1330	N/A	TBA
498	23	"Top 9 Results"	March 27, 2014	1329A & 1330A	N/A	TBA
499	24	"Top 8 Perform"	April 2, 2014	1331 & 1332	N/A	TBA
500	25	"Top 8 Results"	April 3, 2014	1331A & 1332A	N/A	TBA
501	26	"Top 8 Perform Again"	April 9, 2014	1333 & 1334	N/A	TBA
502	27	"Top 8 Results Again"	April 10, 2014	1333A & 1334A	N/A	TBA
503	28	"Top 7 Perform"	April 16, 2014	1335 & 1336	N/A	TBA
504	29	"Top 7 Results"	April 17, 2014	1335A & 1336A	N/A	TBA
505	30	"Top 6 Perform"	April 23, 2014	1337 & 1338	N/A	TBA
506	31	"Top 6 Results"	April 24, 2014	1337A & 1338A	N/A	TBA
507	32	"Top 5 Perform"	April 30, 2014	1339 & 1340	N/A	TBA
508	33	"Top 5 Results"	May 1, 2014	1339A & 1340A	N/A	TBA
509	34	"Top 4 Perform"	May 7, 2014	1341 & 1342	N/A	TBA
510	35	"Top 4 Results"	May 8, 2014	1341A & 1342A	N/A	TBA
511	36	"Top 3 Perform"	May 14, 2014	1343 & 1344	N/A	TBA
512	37	"Top 3 Results"	May 15, 2014	1343A & 1344A	N/A	TBA
513	38	"Top 2 Perform (Pre-Finale)"	May 20, 2014	1345	N/A	TBA
514	39	"Top 2 Results (Finale)"	May 21, 2014	1345A & 1345B	N/A	TBA

=== Season 14 (2015) ===
No. overall	No. in season	Title	Original release date	Prod. code	U.S. viewers (millions)	Rating/share (18–49)
515	1	"Nashville Auditions"	January 7, 2015	1401	N/A	TBA
516	2	"Nashville & Kansas City Auditions"	January 8, 2015	1402 & 1403	N/A	TBA
517	3	"Kansas City Auditions"	January 14, 2015	1404	N/A	TBA
518	4	"Brooklyn Auditions"	January 15, 2015	1405 & 1406	N/A	TBA
519	5	"Minneapolis Auditions"	January 21, 2015	1407	N/A	TBA
520	6	"New Orleans Auditions"	January 22, 2015	1408	N/A	TBA
521	7	"San Francisco Auditions"	January 28, 2015	1409	N/A	TBA
522	8	"San Francisco Auditions (Continued)"	January 29, 2015	1410	N/A	TBA
523	9	"Hollywood Week #1"	February 4, 2015	1411	N/A	TBA
524	10	"Hollywood Week #2"	February 5, 2015	1412	N/A	TBA
525	11	"Hollywood Week #3"	February 11, 2015	1413	N/A	TBA
526	12	"Hollywood Week #4"	February 12, 2015	1414	N/A	TBA
527	13	"Showcase #1"	February 18, 2015	1415	N/A	TBA
528	14	"Showcase #2"	February 19, 2015	1416	N/A	TBA
529	15	"Top 12 Boys Perform"	February 25, 2015	1417	N/A	TBA
530	16	"Top 12 Girls Perform"	February 26, 2015	1418	N/A	TBA
531	17	"Top 8 Guys Perform"	March 4, 2015	1419	N/A	TBA
532	18	"Top 8 Girls Perform"	March 5, 2015	1420	N/A	TBA
533	19	"Top 12 Perform"	March 11, 2015	1421	N/A	TBA
534	20	"Top 11 Perform"	March 12, 2015	1422 & 1423	N/A	TBA
535	21	"Top 11 Perform Again"	March 19, 2015	1424 & 1425	N/A	TBA
536	22	"Top 9 Perform"	March 25, 2015	1426 & 1427	N/A	TBA
537	23	"Top 8 Perform"	April 1, 2015	1428 & 1429	N/A	TBA
538	24	"Top 7 Perform"	April 8, 2015	1430 & 1431	N/A	TBA
539	25	"Top 6 Perform"	April 15, 2015	1432 & 1433	N/A	TBA
540	26	"Top 5 Perform"	April 22, 2015	1434 & 1435	N/A	TBA
541	27	"Top 4 Perform"	April 29, 2015	1436 & 1437	N/A	TBA
542	28	"Top 3 Perform"	May 6, 2015	1438 & 1439	N/A	TBA
543	29	"Top 2 Perform (Pre-Finale)"	May 12, 2015	1440	N/A	TBA
544	30	"Top 2 Results (Finale)"	May 13, 2015	1441 & 1442	N/A	TBA

=== Season 15 (2016) ===
No. overall	No. in season	Title	Original release date	Prod. code	U.S. viewers (millions)	Rating/share (18–49)
545	1	"Denver & Atlanta Auditions"	January 6, 2016	1501 & 1502	N/A	TBA
546	2	"Little Rock & San Francisco Auditions"	January 7, 2016	1503 & 1504	N/A	TBA
547	3	"Philadelphia Auditions"	January 13, 2016	1505	N/A	TBA
548	4	"Denver & Little Rock Auditions"	January 14, 2016	1506 & 1507	N/A	TBA
549	5	"Atlanta, Little Rock, Philadelphia & San Francisco Auditions"	January 20, 2016	1508	N/A	TBA
550	6	"Atlanta, Philadelphia & San Francisco Auditions"	January 21, 2016	1509 & 1510	N/A	TBA
551	7	"Hollywood Round #1"	January 27, 2016	1511	N/A	TBA
552	8	"Hollywood Round #2"	January 28, 2016	1512 & 1513	N/A	TBA
553	9	"Hollywood Round #3"	February 3, 2016	1514	N/A	TBA
554	10	"Hollywood Round #4"	February 4, 2016	1515 & 1516	N/A	TBA
555	11	"Showcase #1: 1st 12 Performances"	February 10, 2016	1517	N/A	TBA
556	12	"Showcase #2: Judges Vote"	February 11, 2016	1518 & 1519	N/A	TBA
557	13	"Showcase #3: 2nd 12 Performances"	February 17, 2016	1520	N/A	TBA
558	14	"Showcase #4: Judges Vote"	February 18, 2016	1521 & 1522	N/A	TBA
559	15	"Wild Card Night: Judges Pick"	February 24, 2016	1523	N/A	TBA
560	16	"Top 10 Perform"	February 25, 2016	1524 & 1525	N/A	TBA
561	17	"Top 8 Perform"	March 3, 2016	1526 & 1527	N/A	TBA
562	18	"Top 6 Perform"	March 10, 2016	1528 & 1529	N/A	TBA
563	19	"Top 5 Perform"	March 17, 2016	1530 & 1531	N/A	TBA
564	20	"Top 4 Perform"	March 24, 2016	1532 & 1533	N/A	TBA
565	21	"Top 3 Perform"	March 31, 2016	1534 & 1535	N/A	TBA
566	22	"Special: American Dream"	April 5, 2016	SP-1616	N/A	TBA
567	23	"Top 2 Perform (Pre-Finale)"	April 6, 2016	1536	N/A	TBA
568	24	"Top 2 Results (Finale)"	April 7, 2016	1537 & 1538	N/A	TBA

=== Season 16 (2018) ===
No. overall	No. in season	Title	Original release date	Prod. code	U.S. viewers (millions)	Rating/share (18–49)
569	1	"Auditions, Part 1"	March 11, 2018	101	10.48	2.3/8
570	2	"Auditions, Part 2"	March 12, 2018	102	8.41	1.8/7
571	3	"Auditions, Part 3"	March 18, 2018	103	7.81	1.8/6
572	4	"Auditions, Part 4"	March 19, 2018	104	7.68	1.6/6
573	5	"Auditions, Part 5"	March 25, 2018	105	7.51	1.7/6
574	6	"Hollywood Week, Part 1"	March 26, 2018	106	7.80	1.7/6
575	7	"Hollywood Week, Part 2"	April 1, 2018	107	7.48	1.6/6
576	8	"Showcase Round & Final Judgment"	April 2, 2018	108	7.16	1.4/5
577	9	"Top 24 Solos, Part 1"	April 8, 2018	109	7.23	1.5/6
578	10	"Top 24 Celebrity Duets, Part 1"	April 9, 2018	110	7.72	1.6/6
579	11	"Top 24 Solos, Part 2"	April 15, 2018	111	6.35	1.3/5
580	12	"Top 24 Celebrity Duets, Part 2"	April 16, 2018	112	6.97	1.4/5
581	13	"Top 14 Perform"	April 22, 2018	113	7.46	1.5/6
582	14	"Top 10 Reveal"	April 23, 2018	114	7.61	1.4/5
583	15	"Top 10 Perform: Disney Night"	April 29, 2018	115	8.77	1.9/7
584	16	"Top 7 Perform"	May 6, 2018	116	8.65	1.8/7
585	17	"Top 5 Perform"	May 13, 2018	117	8.53	1.7/7
586	18	"Performance Finals"	May 20, 2018	118	7.47	1.3/5
587	19	"Grand Finale"	May 21, 2018	119	8.63	1.6/6

=== Season 17 (2019) ===
No. overall	No. in season	Title	Original release date	Prod. code	U.S. viewers (millions)	Rating/share (18–49)
588	1	"Auditions, Part 1"	March 3, 2019	201	8.65	1.7/7
589	2	"Auditions, Part 2"	March 6, 2019	202	7.82	1.5/6
590	3	"Auditions, Part 3"	March 10, 2019	203	7.27	1.3/6
591	4	"Auditions, Part 4"	March 17, 2019	204	7.18	1.3/6
592	5	"Auditions, Part 5"	March 18, 2019	205	6.11	1.2/5
593	6	"Hollywood Week, Part 1"	March 24, 2019	206	7.08	1.2/5
594	7	"Hollywood Week, Part 2"	March 25, 2019	207	6.45	1.2/5
595	8	"Showcase Round & Final Judgment"	March 31, 2019	208	7.22	1.2/5
596	9	"Top 20 Solos"	April 1, 2019	209	6.23	1.1/5
597	10	"All-Star Duets, Part 1"	April 7, 2019	210	6.12	1.0/5
598	11	"All-Star Duets, Part 2"	April 8, 2019	211	6.49	1.1/5
599	12	"Top 14"	April 14, 2019	212	7.26	1.3/6
600	13	"Top 10 Reveal"	April 15, 2019	213	7.10	1.2/5
601	14	"Top 10 Perform: Disney Night"	April 21, 2019	214	7.11	1.3/6
602	15	"Meet Your Finalists"	April 22, 2019	TBA	5.38	0.9/4
603	16	"Top 8 Perform: Queen Night"	April 28, 2019	215	8.74	1.6/7
604	17	"Top 6 Perform: Woodstock & Showstoppers"	May 5, 2019	216	7.49	1.2/5
605	18	"Top 5 Perform: Elton John / Bobby Bones' Choice"	May 12, 2019	217	7.87	1.2/6
606	19	"Grand Finale"	May 19, 2019	218	8.74	1.5/7

=== Season 18 (2020) ===
No. overall	No. in season	Title	Original release date	Prod. code	U.S. viewers (millions)	Rating/share (18–49)
607	1	"Auditions, Part 1"	February 16, 2020	301	8.07	1.5/7
608	2	"Auditions, Part 2"	February 23, 2020	302	7.50	1.4/7
609	3	"Auditions, Part 3"	March 1, 2020	303	6.99	1.3/6
610	4	"Auditions, Part 4"	March 8, 2020	304	7.25	1.3/6
611	5	"Auditions, Part 5"	March 15, 2020	305	7.47	1.3/7
612	6	"Hollywood Week – Genre Challenge"	March 16, 2020	306	6.30	1.3/6
613	7	"Hollywood Week – Duets"	March 22, 2020	307	7.69	1.4/7
614	8	"Hollywood Week – Solos"	March 23, 2020	308	7.02	1.4/7
615	9	"Hawaii Showcase and Final Judgment, Part 1"	March 29, 2020	309	7.32	1.3/6
616	10	"Hawaii Showcase and Final Judgment, Part 2"	April 5, 2020	310	5.63	1.0/5
617	11	"This Is Me, Part 1"	April 12, 2020	311	5.83	1.0/5
618	12	"This Is Me, Part 2"	April 19, 2020	312	5.48	0.8/3
619	13	"Top 20 Sing For America"	April 26, 2020	313	6.09	1.0/4
620	14	"Top 10 Homeward Bound"	May 3, 2020	314	6.40	0.9/4
621	15	"Disney Night/Mother's Day"	May 10, 2020	315	6.16	1.0/4
622	16	"Grand Finale"	May 17, 2020	316	7.28	1.0/5

=== Season 19 (2021) ===
No. overall	No. in season	Title	Original release date	Prod. code	U.S. viewers (millions)	Rating/share (18–49)
623	1	"Auditions, Part 1"	February 14, 2021	401	6.95	1.2/7
624	2	"Auditions, Part 2"	February 21, 2021	402	6.67	1.0/6
625	3	"Auditions, Part 3"	February 28, 2021	403	6.61	1.0/6
626	4	"Auditions, Part 4"	March 7, 2021	404	5.29	0.8/5
627	5	"Auditions, Part 5"	March 14, 2021	405	5.50	0.8/5
628	6	"Hollywood Week: Genre Challenge"	March 21, 2021	406	5.64	0.8/5
629	7	"Hollywood Duets Challenge"	March 22, 2021	407	4.94	0.7/5
630	8	"Showstopper/Final Judgment Part #1"	March 28, 2021	408	6.17	0.8/5
631	9	"Showstopper/Final Judgment Part #2"	March 29, 2021	409	4.99	0.7/5
632	10	"All Star Duets and Solos, Part 1"	April 4, 2021	410	5.61	0.9/6
633	11	"All Star Duets and Solos, Part 2"	April 5, 2021	411	4.72	0.7/4
634	12	"Top 16"	April 11, 2021	412	6.09	0.8/5
635	13	"Top 12 Live Reveal"	April 12, 2021	413	5.38	0.8/5
636	14	"Oscar Nominated Songs"	April 18, 2021	414	5.44	0.8/5
637	15	"The Comeback"	April 19, 2021	415	4.22	0.6/4
638	16	"Disney Night"	May 2, 2021	416	6.01	0.8/6
639	17	"Coldplay Songbook & Mother's Day Dedication"	May 9, 2021	417	5.74	0.9/6
640	18	"My Personal Idol/Artist Singles"	May 16, 2021	418	6.11	0.8/5
641	19	"Grand Finale"	May 23, 2021	419	6.50	0.9/6

=== Season 20 (2022) ===
No. overall	No. in season	Title	Original release date	Prod. code	U.S. viewers (millions)	Rating/share (18–49)
642	1	"Auditions, Part 1"	February 27, 2022	501	6.30	0.9/7
643	2	"Auditions, Part 2"	March 6, 2022	502	6.57	1.1/8
644	3	"Auditions, Part 3"	March 13, 2022	503	6.64	1.0/7
645	4	"Auditions, Part 4"	March 20, 2022	504	5.40	0.7/5
646	5	"Auditions, Part 5"	March 21, 2022	505	5.29	0.7/6
647	6	"Auditions, Part 5A"	March 28, 2022	505A	2.95	0.6/10
648	7	"Hollywood Week: Genre Challenge"	March 28, 2022	506	5.66	0.7/6
649	8	"Hollywood Duets Challenge"	April 3, 2022	507	4.89	0.7/5
650	9	"Showstopper/Final Judgment"	April 4, 2022	508	5.58	0.6/5
651	10	"Top 24 at Disney's Aulani Resort in Hawaii Part #1"	April 10, 2022	509	5.47	0.7/6
652	11	"Top 24 at Disney's Aulani Resort in Hawaii Part #2"	April 11, 2022	510	5.31	0.7/6
653	12	"Season 20's Top 20"	April 17, 2022	511	5.27	0.7/6
654	13	"Top 14 Live Reveal"	April 18, 2022	512	5.57	0.6/5
655	14	"Top 14"	April 24, 2022	513	5.88	0.8/7
656	15	"Judge's Song Contest"	April 25, 2022	514	5.82	0.7/6
657	16	"Disney Night"	May 1, 2022	515	6.57	0.9/8
658	17	"The Great Idol Reunion"	May 2, 2022	516	5.89	0.7/5
659	18	"Top 7"	May 8, 2022	517	5.52	0.8/6
660	19	"Top 5"	May 15, 2022	518	5.57	0.7/5
661	20	"Grand Finale"	May 22, 2022	519	6.49	0.8/6

=== Season 21 (2023) ===
No. overall	No. in season	Title	Original release date	Prod. code	U.S. viewers (millions)	Rating/share (18–49)
662	1	"Auditions, Part 1"	February 19, 2023	601	5.27	0.6/6
663	2	"Auditions, Part 2"	February 26, 2023	602	5.25	0.7/7
664	3	"Auditions, Part 3"	March 5, 2023	603	5.62	0.7/6
665	4	"Auditions, Part 3A"	March 13, 2023	603A	3.34	0.6/11
666	5	"Auditions, Part 4"	March 19, 2023	604	4.88	0.6/5
667	6	"Auditions, Part 5"	March 26, 2023	605	5.25	0.7/6
668	7	"Hollywood Week Part #1"	April 2, 2023	606	5.06	0.7/6
669	8	"Hollywood Week Part #2"	April 3, 2023	607	4.42	0.5/5
670	9	"Showstopper/Final Judgment Part #1"	April 9, 2023	608	4.58	0.5/5
671	10	"Showstopper/Final Judgment Part #2"	April 10, 2023	609	4.46	0.6/5
672	11	"Top 26 at Disney's Aulani Resort in Hawaii Part #1"	April 16, 2023	610	5.35	0.6/6
673	12	"Top 26 at Disney's Aulani Resort in Hawaii Part #2"	April 17, 2023	611	4.36	0.5/5
674	13	"Top 20"	April 23, 2023	612	5.37	0.7/7
675	14	"Top 12 Reveal!"	April 24, 2023	613	4.90	0.6/5
676	15	"Rock and Roll Hall of Fame Night"	April 30, 2023	614	5.92	0.7/7
677	16	"Judge's Song Contest"	May 1, 2023	615	5.41	0.6/5
678	17	"Top 8: Alanis Morissette/Ed Sheeran"	May 7, 2023	616	6.12	0.8/7
679	18	"Disney Night"	May 14, 2023	617	6.33	0.9/10
680	19	"Journey to the Finale"	May 15, 2023	617A	2.70	0.3/3
681	20	"Season Finale"	May 21, 2023	618	6.62	0.8/8

=== Season 22 (2024) ===
No. overall	No. in season	Title	Original release date	Prod. code	U.S. viewers (millions)	Rating/share (18–49)
682	1	"Auditions, Part 1"	February 18, 2024	701	4.62	0.6/6
683	2	"Auditions, Part 2"	February 25, 2024	702	4.79	0.6/6
684	3	"Auditions, Part 3"	March 3, 2024	703	5.11	0.6/7
685	4	"Auditions, Part 4"	March 17, 2024	704	4.79	0.5/6
686	5	"Auditions, Part 5"	March 24, 2024	705	4.25	0.4/4
687	6	"Hollywood Week - Idol Arena"	March 31, 2024	706	4.40	0.6/6
688	7	"Showstopper/Final Judgment"	April 1, 2024	707	3.88	0.4/4
689	8	"Top 24 at Disney's Aulani Resort in Hawaii Part #1"	April 7, 2024	708	4.36	0.5/5
690	9	"Top 24 at Disney's Aulani Resort in Hawaii Part #2"	April 8, 2024	709	4.15	0.5/5
691	10	"Top 20"	April 14, 2024	710	4.24	0.5/6
692	11	"Top 14 Reveal"	April 15, 2024	711	3.94	0.4/4
693	12	"Rock & Roll Hall of Fame"	April 21, 2024	712	5.13	0.5/5
694	13	"Billboard #1 Hits"	April 22, 2024	713	4.16	0.4/4
695	14	"Top 10" "Shania Twain Mentors the Top 10 on Songs From Their Year of Birth"	April 28, 2024	714	5.31	0.6/7
696	15	"Judge's Song Contest"	April 29, 2024	715	4.62	0.5/5
697	16	"Adele Night"	May 5, 2024	716	4.96	0.5/6
698	17	"Disney Night"	May 12, 2024	717	5.22	0.6/7
699	18	"Grand Finale"	May 19, 2024	718	5.64	0.7/7

=== Season 23 (2025) ===
No. overall	No. in season	Title	Original release date	Prod. code	U.S. viewers (millions)	Rating/share (18–49)
700	1	"Post Oscars: Auditions Part 1"	March 2, 2025	801	5.91	0.8/13
701	2	"Auditions, Part 2"	March 9, 2025	802	4.49	0.5/6
702	3	"Auditions, Part 3"	March 16, 2025	803	4.51	0.5/6
703	4	"Auditions, Part 4"	March 23, 2025	804	4.06	0.4/5
704	5	"Auditions, Part 5"	March 30, 2025	805	4.66	0.5/7
705	6	"Hollywood Week: Idol Arena"	March 31, 2025	806	3.78	0.4/5
706	7	"Hollywood Week: Showstopper"	April 6, 2025	807	5.12	0.5/7
707	8	"Head to Head"	April 7, 2025	808	4.15	0.5/5
708	9	"Top 24 at Disney's Aulani Resort in Hawaii Part #1"	April 13, 2025	809	4.65	0.5/8
709	10	"Top 24 at Disney's Aulani Resort in Hawaii Part #2"	April 14, 2025	810	3.88	0.4/6
710	11	"Songs of Faith"	April 20, 2025	811	4.49	0.5/8
711	12	"Top 14 Reveal"	April 21, 2025	812	4.19	0.4/6
712	13	"Rock & Roll Hall of Fame"	April 27, 2025	813	5.31	0.5/7
713	14	"Iconic Idol Moments"	April 28, 2025	814	4.61	0.5/7
714	15	"Ladies' Night"	May 4, 2025	815	5.17	0.6/7
715	16	"Judge's Song Contest"	May 5, 2025	816	4.28	0.4/5
716	17	"Disney Night #1"	May 11, 2025	817	5.27	0.6/9
717	18	"Disney Night #2"	May 12, 2025	818	4.45	0.4/5
718	19	"Grand Finale"	May 18, 2025	819	6.51	0.7/10

=== Season 24 ===
No. overall	No. in season	Title	Original release date	Prod. code	U.S. viewers (millions)	Rating/share (18–49)
719	1	"Auditions, Part 1"	January 26, 2026	901	N/A	TBA
720	2	"Auditions, Part 2"	February 2, 2026	902	N/A	TBA
721	3	"Auditions, Part 3"	February 9, 2026	903	N/A	TBA
722	4	"Auditions, Part 4"	February 16, 2026	904	N/A	TBA
723	5	"Hollywood Week In Music City - Part 1"	February 23, 2026	905	N/A	TBA
724	6	"Hollywood Week In Music City - Part 2"	March 2, 2026	906	N/A	TBA
725	7	"'Ohana Round"	March 9, 2026	907	N/A	TBA
726	8	"Top 20 at Disney's Aulani Resort in Hawai'i - Part 1"	March 16, 2026	908	N/A	TBA
727	9	"Top 20 at Disney's Aulani Resort in Hawai'i - Part 2"	March 23, 2026	909	N/A	TBA
728	10	"Songs of Faith"	March 30, 2026	910	N/A	TBA
729	11	"90s Judges' Song Contest"	April 6, 2026	911	N/A	TBA
730	12	"Rock & Roll Hall of Fame"	April 13, 2026	912	N/A	TBA
731	13	"Disney Night"	April 20, 2026	913	N/A	TBA
732	14	"Celebrating Taylor Swift on American Idol"	April 27, 2026	914	N/A	TBA
733	15	"Class of 2006: Reunion / Idol X DWTS"	May 4, 2026	915	N/A	TBA
734	16	"Grand Finale"	May 11, 2026	915A	N/A	TBA

== Most watched episodes ==
American Idol has seen its fair share of viewership changes over the years. The show had 38.1 million viewers in the finale of season 2 and an all-time low with a mere 5.55 million viewers tuning in to watch the final performances of the fourteenth season.

Rank	Season	Episode Title	Original Air-Date	Viewers (millions)	Rating/Share (18–49)	Rating/Share (HH)	Notes	Source(s)
1	2	"Season 2 Finale"	May 21, 2003	38.1	16.8/?	—N/a	The most-watched American Idol episode of all-time	
2	6	"Minneapolis Auditions"	January 16, 2007	37.44	15.8/36	20.3/29	The highest-rated Idol premiere	
3	6	"Seattle Auditions"	January 17, 2007	36.94	15.5/36	20.1/30	The highest-rated non-premiere/non-finale	
4	5	"Season 5 Finale"	May 24, 2006	36.38	14.2/35	20.5/32		
5	5	"Chicago Auditions"	January 17, 2006	35.53	15.3/34	19.3/28		
6	5	"Greensboro Auditions"	January 24, 2006	34.96	15.1/35	19.6/29		
7	6	"New York Auditions"	January 24, 2007	33.87	14.1/35	18.9/28		
8	6	"Birmingham Auditions"	January 30, 2007	33.65	13.5/33	18.6/28		
9	4	"Washington D.C. Auditions"	January 18, 2005	33.6	14.0/?	—N/a		
10	5	"Top 11 Perform"	March 21, 2006	33.36	13.6/33	19.2/28		
10	6	"San Antonio Auditions	February 6, 2007	33.36	13.5/33	18.6/28		
