= Kristy Lee Cook =

American country music singer

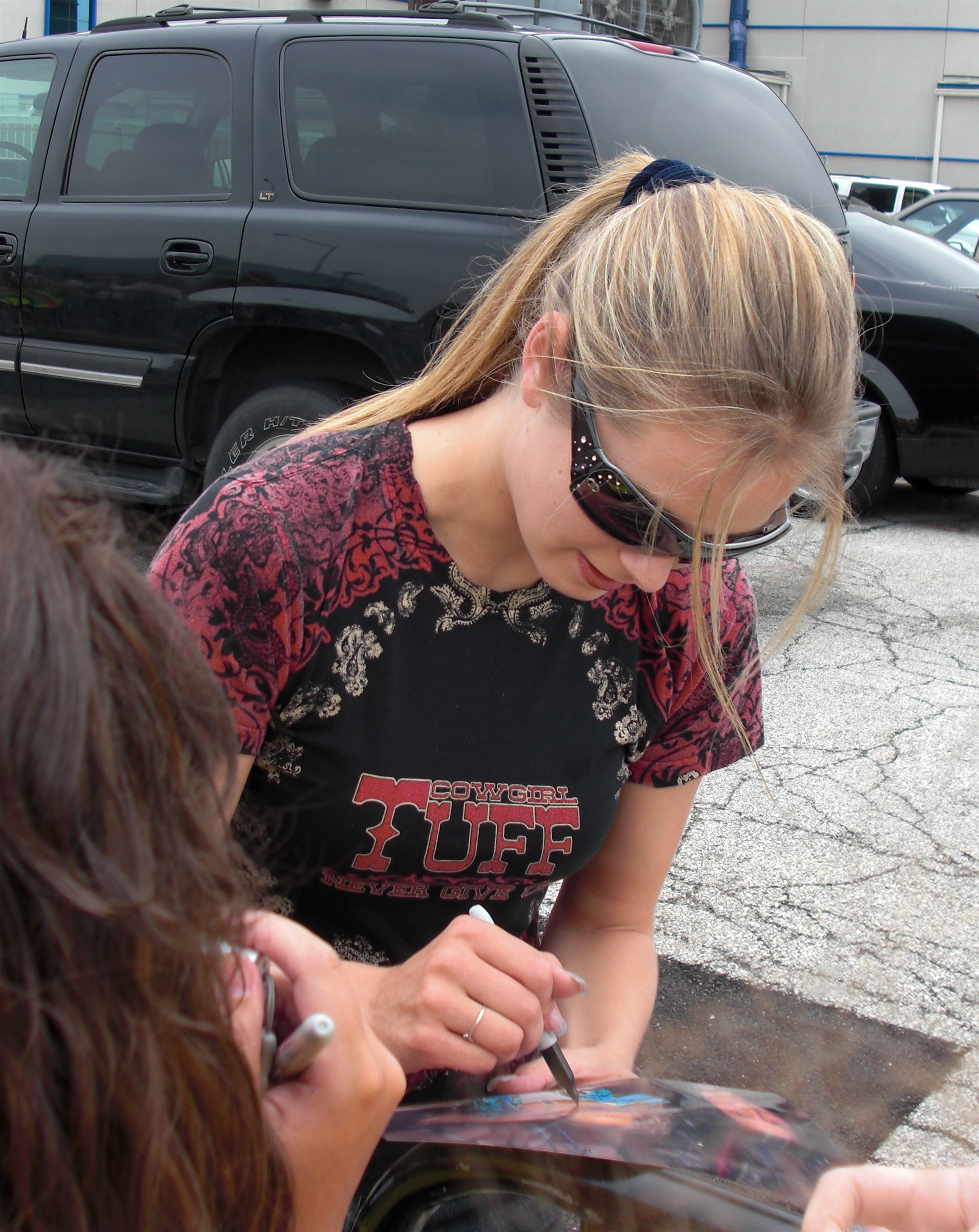
- Cook signing autographs during the American Idols LIVE! Tour 2008

Background information
- Born: January 18, 1984 (age 41); Seattle, Washington, United States
- Origin: Selma, Oregon
- Genres: Country
- Occupation: Singer
- Instrument: Vocals
- Years active: 1999–present
- Labels: Ren-Hen; Arista Nashville; BBR
- Website: kristyleecook.com

Kristy Lee Cook (born January 18, 1984) is an American country music singer and television personality. She was the seventh place finalist on the seventh season of American Idol. In 2005, Cook released her first album called Devoted. In June 2008, Cook signed to 19 Recordings and Arista Nashville. She released her post-Idol album, Why Wait, on September 16, 2008. This album produced her first chart single, "15 Minutes of Shame", a Top 30 hit on the Billboard country charts. Her first single for Broken Bow Records, "Airborne Ranger Infantry", was released on October 16, 2012.

Cook hosted the 2010 TV show Outdoor's 10 Best, and was a main judge on the 2011 competition show Wanted: Adventure Host. She starred in the 2011 reality television show Goin' Country. Since 2015, she has hosted the show The Most Wanted List.

== Personal life ==
Cook was born in Seattle, Washington, to Larry and Carlene Cook. She is the youngest of three children. Her brother-in-law is retired American football quarterback John Dutton of the Arena Football League. She lives in Amarillo, Texas.

== Early career ==
In 2001, at the age of 17, Cook signed her first contract with BMI. According to her RMG page, she signed with RCA Records/Arista Nashville in 1999, and was the first artist signed to Britney Spears' production company. Spears agreed to make a cameo appearance in her first music video. However, RCA placed Cook and other younger artists on hold and then dropped her.

Cook then moved to Dallas, Texas, in an attempt to pursue her career and to gain more experience. She began modeling and appeared in commercials. In 2005, Ren-Hen Records released her first album, Devoted. During this time, Kristy Lee performed for two years at Cowboy's nightclub in Arlington, Texas, singing eight songs per night with the band Six Shooter.

In 2007, Cook returned to Selma, Oregon, to prepare for the American Idol audition. To raise funds for her audition and travel expenses, she sold her "really good" barrel horse. She had hoped to earn enough money to repurchase her horse on her return. However, the night she was eliminated, she commented that the person to whom she had sold the horse was unwilling to sell it back.

== American Idol ==
=== Overview ===
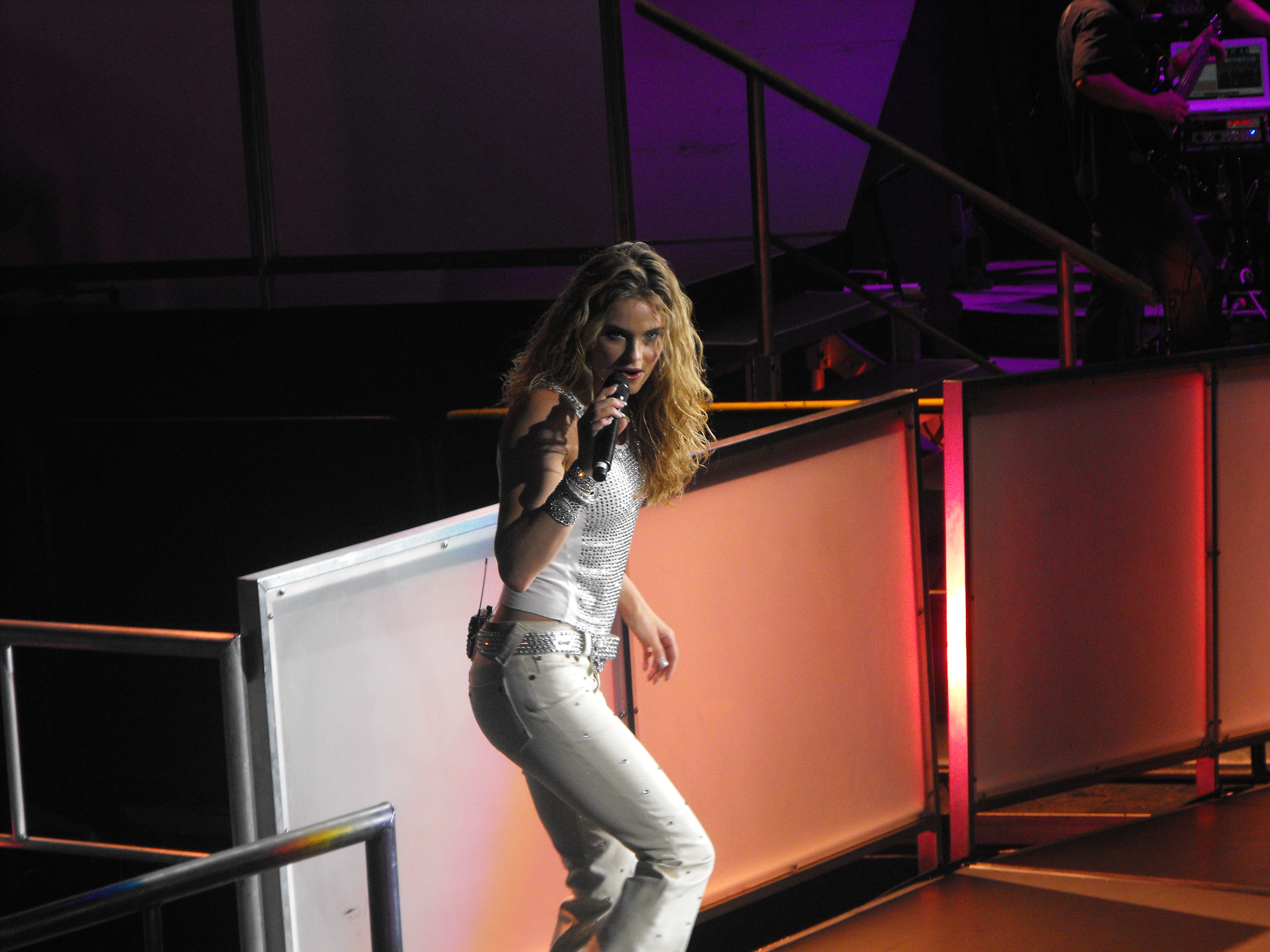
Cook performing during the American Idols Live! Tour 2008.

Cook auditioned for American Idol in Philadelphia, Pennsylvania, by singing "Amazing Grace". All three judges liked her voice and sent her straight through to Hollywood. In Hollywood, her first song did not impress the judges. For her second and final chance, she sang "Amazing Grace" again; she was then selected as one of the top 24 contestants in the semi-finals. She was the first female performer of the season and sang "Rescue Me". The judges did not care for her performance but gave her props since she was the first of the night and she had bronchitis. On March 12, Cook was placed in the bottom three with Syesha Mercado and David Hernandez. She was declared safe. On March 19, she was placed in the bottom three again with Carly Smithson and Amanda Overmyer, but she survived again, ensuring herself a spot in the American Idol Top 10 Concert Tour for the coming summer. Once again, on April 2, she was placed in the bottom three with her two roommates, Ramiele Malubay and Brooke White. Malubay was eliminated.

=== Performances ===
Week #	Theme	Song choice	Original artist	Order #	Result
Top 24 (12 Women)	1960s	"Rescue Me"	Fontella Bass	1	Safe
Top 20 (10 Women)	1970s	"You're No Good"	Betty Everett	5	Safe
Top 16 (8 Women)	1980s	"Faithfully"	Journey	5	Safe
Top 12	Lennon–McCartney	"Eight Days a Week"	The Beatles	11	Bottom 2^{1}
Top 11	The Beatles	"You've Got to Hide Your Love Away"	The Beatles	2	Bottom 2^{2}
Top 10	Year They Were Born	"God Bless the USA"	Lee Greenwood	9	Safe
Top 9	Dolly Parton	"Coat of Many Colors"	Dolly Parton	7	Bottom 2^{3}
Top 8	Inspirational	"Anyway"	Martina McBride	4	Safe
Top 7	Mariah Carey	"Forever"	Mariah Carey	5	Eliminated

- ^Note 1 When Ryan Seacrest announced the results for this particular night, Cook was among the bottom three but was declared safe second when David Hernandez was eliminated.
- ^Note 2 When Seacrest announced the results for this particular night, Cook was among the bottom three but declared safe second when Amanda Overmyer was eliminated.
- ^Note 3 When Seacrest announced the results for this particular night, Cook was among the bottom three but declared safe second when Ramiele Malubay was eliminated.

== Post-Idol career, 2008-2009 ==
After American Idol, Cook was interviewed on The Ellen DeGeneres Show, Live with Regis and Kelly and on WNYW in New York City. She performed with the other top 10 finalists on the American Idols LIVE! Tour 2008 which ran from July 1 to September 13, 2008. She sang "Squeezin' the Love Outta You" (Redmon and Vale), "God Bless the USA" (Lee Greenwood), which she performed on Top 10 night during the season, and "Cowgirls" (Kerry Harvick). In Toronto, she replaced "God Bless the USA" with "Anyway" (Martina McBride), which she had performed on Top 8 night during the season.

Cook announced on June 29, 2008, that she had once again signed with Arista Nashville and with 19 Recordings. On August 12 of that year, "15 Minutes of Shame" was released as the first single for Cook's upcoming studio album. It entered the Billboard Hot Country Songs charts at number 58 a week before its release and peaked at number 28. Her album, Why Wait, released on September 16, 2008, was produced by the Nashville singer-songwriter Brett James.

In the fall of 2008 and 2009, Cook performed "The Star-Spangled Banner" at NCAA football games hosted by both Vanderbilt Commodores and Middle Tennessee State University. On October 25, 2008, Cook made her first appearance on the Grand Ole Opry. Arista Nashville announced on December 10, 2008, that Cook and the label had parted ways.

== Broken Bow Records ==
On August 4, 2010, it was announced Cook had signed with Broken Bow Records.

On October 16, 2012, Cook's first single from Broken Bow Records, "Airborne Ranger Infantry", was released. She was inspired to write the songs after reading poems written by her father, Larry Cook, about his experiences in the Army during the Vietnam War. "We took lines directly from the poems and put them into the song," Kristy said. "I wouldn't have written the song if my dad hadn't written those poems, because he doesn't really talk about much. The cool thing is that it gives perspective to someone who doesn't know what it's like to know how they feel and what they're experiencing. It was really important for us to make sure it was right, and exactly what they would say." Cook's second Broken Bow single, "Wherever Love Goes", was released to country radio on August 12, 2013. The song was originally recorded by Cook as a duet with labelmate Randy Houser on his 2013 album How Country Feels; the single version changes the vocal parts from the original to make Cook more prominent. Cook has been released from her record deal with Broken Bow Records and her album believed to have been scrapped.

== TV career ==
Cook hosted Outdoor's 10 Best in 2010. She appeared as a judge in the same year in Wanted: Adventure Host. She starred in a reality show, Goin' Country, which documented her two loves of hunting and singing, in 2011. Since 2015, she has hosted the hunting show The Most Wanted List.

== Charity work ==
Cook founded the Kristy Lee Horse Heaven Foundation, which specializes in caring for, saving and training horses. "I love horses with all my heart, and they have always been there for me through the good and the difficult times. The least I can do is to give back to them in appreciation of all they have done and meant to me." Cook also enters the horses in gymkhanas and other horse events.

== Discography ==
=== Studio albums ===
Title	Album details	Peak chart positions	
Title	Album details	US Country	US
Devoted	Release date: 2005; Label: Ren-Hen Records	—	—
Why Wait	Release date: September 16, 2008; Label: Arista Nashville	8	49
"—" denotes releases that did not chart

=== Extended plays ===
Title	Album details
All Kinds of Crazy	Release date: May 6, 2016; Label: Broken Bow Records

=== Singles ===
Year	Single	Peak chart positions		Album
Year	Single	US Country	US Country Airplay	Album
2008	"15 Minutes of Shame"	28		Why Wait
2012	"Airborne Ranger Infantry"	—	50	—
2013	"Wherever Love Goes" (with Randy Houser)	—	57	—
2014	"Lookin' for a Cowgirl"	—	—	—
"—" denotes releases that did not chart

=== Music videos ===
Year	Video	Director
2005	"Devoted"	
2008	"15 Minutes of Shame"	Steven Goldmann
2012	"Airborne Ranger Infantry"	Roman White
