= Gallery (Mario Vazquez song) =

Single by Mario Vazquez

from the album Mario Vazquez
- B-side: "Spanglish version"
- Released: April 17, 2006
- Genre: R&B, pop
- Length: 3:43; 3:48 (Baby Bash remix)
- Label: J
- Songwriters: Shaffer Smith, Erik Tor Hermansen, Jon Ortiz, Mikkel Eriksen
- Producer: Stargate

Mario Vazquez singles chronology
"Gallery" (2006)	"One Shot" (2007)

"Gallery" is the debut single by artist Mario Vazquez, taken from his self-titled debut album. It was written by Ne-Yo and Stargate, who also produced the track whereas the former handled the song's vocal production. The song was one of the most added records at rhythmic radio stations across the United States in its first week of released, and was sent out to Top 40 radio on April 17, 2006. It was made available through all digital retailers as a single release on May 2, 2006, with both English and Spanglish (macaronic) versions of "Gallery" were released digitally and serviced to radio. The music video was released on May 30, 2006. The single managed to peak at number 35 on the Billboard Hot 100, but fared better on the Billboard Pop 100, peaking at number fifteen. It also peaked at number 42 on the Australian ARIA Top 100 and reached the top 15 in France.

Remixes were released featuring Baby Bash and Obie Trice. The Baby Bash version received a music video.

== Charts ==
Chart performance for "Gallery"
Chart (2006–2007)	Peak position
Australia (ARIA)	42
Australian Urban (ARIA)	13
Denmark (Tracklisten)	37
European Hot 100 Singles (Billboard)	48
France (SNEP)	15
Sweden (Sverigetopplistan)	22
Switzerland (Schweizer Hitparade)	35
US Billboard Hot 100	35
US Pop Airplay (Billboard)	6
