= Randy Houser discography =

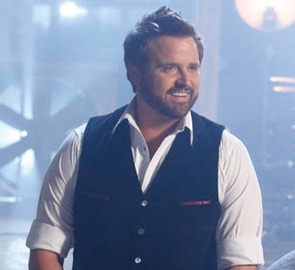
- Houser at Walmart Soundcheck in 2013
- Studio albums: 6
- Singles: 16
- Music videos: 13
- #1 Singles: 3

American country music singer Randy Houser has released six studio albums, sixteen singles, including one as a featured artist, and thirteen music videos.

Houser released his first album, Anything Goes, in 2008 through Universal South Records. It included the hit single, "Boots On", which reached number two on the Billboard Hot Country Songs chart. After a series of under-performing singles, Houser left the Show Dog-Universal Music label group and signed with Stoney Creek Records in 2011. His first album on that label, 2013's How Country Feels, generated four consecutive top-three singles on the country charts, including two number-ones. He released his fourth album, Fired Up, in 2016, which was led by the chart-topping single, "We Went".

== Studio albums ==
Title	Details	Peak chart positions					Certifications	Sales
Title	Details	US	US Country	US Indie	AUS	CAN	Certifications	Sales
Anything Goes	Release date: November 18, 2008; Label: Universal South Records; Formats: CD, music download	101	21	—	—	—		
They Call Me Cadillac	Release date: September 21, 2010; Label: Show Dog-Universal Music; Formats: CD, music download, vinyl	43	8	—	—	—		
How Country Feels	Release date: January 22, 2013; Label: Stoney Creek Records; Formats: CD, music download	11	3	3	—	—	RIAA: Gold	US: 228,000
Fired Up	Release date: March 11, 2016; Label: Stoney Creek Records; Formats: CD, music download	15	3	2	—	18		US: 53,400
Magnolia	Release date: January 11, 2019; Label: Stoney Creek Records; Formats: CD, music download	135	11	2	53	—		US: 12,000
Note to Self	Released: November 11, 2022; Label: Magnolia; Formats: CD, LP, Digital download	—	—	—	—	—		
"—" denotes releases that did not chart

== Singles ==
=== As lead artist ===
Year	Single	Peak chart positions					Certifications (sales threshold)	Album
Year	Single	US	US Country Songs	US Country Airplay	CAN	CAN Country	Certifications (sales threshold)	Album
2008	"Anything Goes"	92	16		—	41		Anything Goes
2009	"Boots On"	53	2		—	27		Anything Goes
2009	"Whistlin' Dixie"	—	31		—	—		They Call Me Cadillac
2010	"I'm All About It"	—	49		—	—		They Call Me Cadillac (Deluxe Edition)
2010	"A Man Like Me"	—	53		—	—		They Call Me Cadillac
2011	"In God's Time"	—	54		—	—		Non-album single
2012	"How Country Feels"	42	6	1	46	1	RIAA: Platinum; MC: Gold; RMNZ: Gold	How Country Feels
2013	"Runnin' Outta Moonlight"	24	3	1	44	1	RIAA: Platinum; MC: Platinum	How Country Feels
2013	"Goodnight Kiss"	52	9	2	50	3	RIAA: Gold	How Country Feels
2014	"Like a Cowboy"	62	9	3	87	6	RIAA: Gold	How Country Feels
2015	"We Went"	60	7	1	93	3		Fired Up
2016	"Song Number 7"	—	46	43	—	—		Fired Up
2016	"Chasing Down a Good Time"	—	—	—	—	—		Fired Up
2018	"What Whiskey Does" (featuring Hillary Lindsey)	—	40	31	—	—		Magnolia
2019	"No Stone Unturned"	—	—	59	—	—		Magnolia
2022	"Note to Self"	—	—	29	—	—	RIAA: Gold	Note to Self
2023	"Cancel"	—	—	60	—	—		Note to Self (Deluxe)
2024	"Country Back"	—	—	48	—	—		Non-album single
2026	"Back in the Bottle"	—	—	41	—	—		TBA
"—" denotes releases that did not chart

=== As featured artist ===
Year	Single	Peak positions
Year	Single	US Country Airplay
2013	"Wherever Love Goes" (Kristy Lee Cook featuring Randy Houser)	57

== Music videos ==
Year	Video	Director
2008	"Anything Goes"	Vincenzo Giammanco
2009	"Boots On"	Drake Vaughan/Eric Welch
2009	"Whistlin' Dixie"	Chris Hicky
2010	"Boots On" (club version)	Rob Dennis
2012	"How Country Feels"	Wes Edwards
2013	"Runnin' Outta Moonlight"	Wes Edwards
2014	"High in the Saddle (Can't Kill a Memory)"	Kix Brooks
2014	"Goodnight Kiss"	Wes Edwards
2014	"Like a Cowboy"	Dustin Rikert
2015	"We Went"	Dustin Rikert
2018	"No Good Place to Cry"	Dustin Rikert
2019	"No Stone Unturned"	Michael Monaco
2019	"What Whiskey Does"	Jim Shea
2022	"Note to Self"	Emanuel Fialik
