= Tonita Castro =

Mexican American actress (1953–2016)

- Born: January 8, 1953; Jalisco, Mexico
- Died: May 8, 2016 (aged 63); Buena Park, California, U.S.
- Occupation: Actress
- Years active: 2005–2016

Tonita Castro (January 8, 1953 – May 8, 2016) was a Mexican-born American actress from Jalisco, Mexico.

Coming to the United States from Mexico in the late 1970s, Castro initially sought to become a teacher before securing a job at Radio Express. She would go on to work there for over 20 years.

Castro made the transfer to screen acting in 2005 in an appearance on the crime drama The Shield. She made guest appearances in series like Glee, Little Britain USA, The Sarah Silverman Program, The Travelers, Two and a Half Men, Kroll Show, and Life in Pieces. Castro was a recurring cast member in the TV series Go On starring Matthew Perry in 2012-2013. In 2013, she was part of the main cast for the short lived sitcom Dads, which was executive produced by Seth MacFarlane.

In film, Castro made appearances in Imagine That, Funny People, Our Family Wedding, Bad Ass, Seeking a Friend for the End of the World, The Book of Life, and In God's Time.

During her stint on Life in Pieces, Castro began feeling ill, and was eventually diagnosed with stomach cancer. She died from the disease on May 8, 2016.

== Filmography ==
=== Film ===
Year	Title	Role	Notes
2006	Friends with Money	Teresa	
2006	Something New	Maria	
2009	Imagine That	Graceilla	
2009	Funny People	Bonita	
2010	Sympathy for Delicious	Desperate Mexican Woman	
2010	Our Family Wedding	Aunt Rosita	
2011	The Future	Second Solicitation	
2011	Sound of My Voice	Lumela	
2012	Mosquita y Mari	Dona Herlinda	
2012	Bad Ass	Frank's Mother	
2012	Seeking a Friend for the End of the World	Elsa	
2014	The Book of Life	La Muerte as Old Woman	Voice role
2016	Broken Vows	Seamstress	Posthumous release
2017	Wilson	Nanny	Posthumous release

=== Television ===
Year	Title	Role	Notes
2005	The Shield	Carmen	1 episode
2007	Life	Housekeeper	1 episode
2007-2008	The Sarah Silverman Program	Dora	3 episodes
2008	Little Britain USA	Fat Fighter	3 episodes
2009	The League	Theresa	1 episode
2010	Tracey Ullman's State of the Union	Maria	1 episode
2010	Glee	Imelda	1 episode
2010	Dexter	Venezuelan Woman	1 episode
2010	Two and a Half Men	Esmeralda	1 episode
2011	Raising Hope	Carmela	1 episode
2011	Southland	Teresa	1 episode
2011	Traffic Light	Mrs. Ramirez	1 episode
2011	Awkward	Lupita	1 episode
2012-2013	Go On	Fausta	Recurring role, 22 episodes
2013-2014	Kroll Show	Consuela	Recurring role, 4 episodes
2013-2014	Dads	Edna	Main role, 19 episodes
2014	Jennifer Falls	Alma	1 episode
2015	The Grinder	Yolanda	1 episode
2015	Bella and the Bulldogs	Abuela	2 episodes
2015	Life in Pieces	Tonita	2 episodes
