= Casey James (album) =

Studio album by Casey James
- Released: March 20, 2012
- Genre: Country
- Length: 39:18
- Labels: BNA, 19
- Producers: Casey James (all tracks); Chris Lindsey (all tracks); Aimee Mayo (track 11)

Singles from Casey James
- 1. "Let's Don't Call It a Night" Released: August 15, 2011; 2. "Crying on a Suitcase" Released: June 18, 2012; 3. "The Good Life" Released: April 1, 2013

Casey James is the debut studio album by American Idol season nine finalist, Casey James. The album was released on March 20, 2012, in the United States by BNA Records. The album produced three singles: "Let's Don't Call It a Night," "Crying on a Suitcase," and "The Good Life."

== Background ==
James signed with Sony Music Nashville in August 2010 after appearing on American Idol, and had planned to release his album in 2011. The album however was not released until March 2012. James co-wrote nine of the CD's eleven tracks and co-produced the CD with Chris Lindsey. James co-wrote his single "Let's Don't Call It a Night" with Brice Long and Terry McBride.

== Reception ==
Professional ratings
Review scores
Source	Rating
Allmusic	3.5/5 stars
Roughstock	4/5 stars
Taste of Country	3.5/5 stars
CMIL	4/5 stars

The album is generally well received by the critics. Stephen Thomas Erlewine of Allmusic considered that every element in the album "has been vetted and polished, every song targeted at an individual audience", and that "there is the soul of a musician evident beneath the heavy gloss, the sense that James is attempting to reshape his favorite sounds for a wide audience." Matt Bjorke of Roughstock thought that it is a "well-written, strongly-produced debut album", while Billy Dukes of Taste of Country considered it "an easy album to listen to start to finish, and the singer’s beachy, gravely timber make him easy to identify."

== Chart performance and sales ==
Casey James debuted at number 23 on the Billboard 200, with first week sales of 14,000 copies. The album has sold 77,000 copies in the US as of April 2013.

== Track listing ==
No.	Title	Writer(s)	Length
1.	"The Good Life"	Casey James, Scooter Carusoe	3:30
2.	"Crying on a Suitcase"	Lee Thomas Miller, Tom Shapiro, Neil Thrasher	3:42
3.	"Let's Don't Call It a Night"	C. James, Brice Long, Terry McBride	3:26
4.	"Drive"	C. James, Brad Warren, Brett Warren	3:32
5.	"Love the Way You Miss Me"	C. James, Long, McBride	3:39
6.	"Undone"	C. James, Carusoe	3:25
7.	"So Sweet"	C. James, Dallas Davidson, Patrick Davis	3:31
8.	"She's Money"	C. James, Jaren Johnston	4:03
9.	"Tough Love"	C. James, Brett James, David Lee Murphy	3:30
10.	"Workin' On It"	Bob DiPiero, Brandon Kinney, Daniel Tashian	3:22
11.	"Miss Your Fire"	C. James, Chris Lindsey, Aimee Mayo	3:38

== Personnel ==
- Pat Buchanan- electric guitar
- Gary Burnette- acoustic guitar
- Perry Coleman- background vocals
- Dan Dugmore- pedal steel guitar
- Shannon Forrest- drums
- Tony Harrell- accordion, organ, piano, Wurlitzer
- Casey James- dobro, acoustic guitar, electric guitar, slide guitar, lead vocals
- Chris Lindsey- keyboards
- B. James Lowry- acoustic guitar
- Jimmie Lee Sloas- bass guitar
- Ilya Toshinsky- banjo, acoustic guitar

== Singles ==
- "Let's Don't Call It a Night" as released on August 15, 2011, and sold 5,000 copies in its debut week.
- "Crying on a Suitcase" is the second single.
- "The Good Life" was released as the album's third single.

== Charts ==
=== Weekly charts ===
Chart (2012)	Peak position
US Billboard 200	23
US Top Country Albums (Billboard)	2

=== Year-end charts ===
Chart (2012)	Position
US Top Country Albums (Billboard)	72
