= Dads (2013 TV series) =

American sitcom

- Genre: Sitcom
- Created by: Alec Sulkin; Wellesley Wild
- Starring: Seth Green; Giovanni Ribisi; Brenda Song; Vanessa Lachey; Tonita Castro; Peter Riegert; Martin Mull
- Theme music composer: The Bogmen
- Composers: Bill Ryan; Brendan Ryan
- Country of origin: United States
- Original language: English
- No. of seasons: 1
- No. of episodes: 19

Production
- Executive producers: Seth MacFarlane; Alec Sulkin; Wellesley Wild; Mike Scully
- Camera setup: Multi-camera
- Running time: 30 minutes
- Production companies: Fuzzy Door Productions; 20th Century Fox Television

Original release
- Network: Fox
- Release: September 17, 2013 – July 16, 2014

Dads (stylized in all lowercase) is an American television sitcom created by Wellesley Wild, Alec Sulkin and Seth MacFarlane for Fox. The series follows Warner and Eli, two successful video game developers whose lives are unexpectedly changed when their respective fathers move in with them. Sulkin and Wild are also executive producers. The show was recorded in front of a live studio audience. Dads was a joint production by Fuzzy Door Productions and 20th Century Fox Television. The series ran from September 17, 2013 to July 16, 2014.

== Cast and characters ==
- Seth Green as Eli Sachs, Warner's business partner. He is portrayed as the "creative" end of the video game business. While Warner is often seen in a smart shirt and tie, Eli generally wears T-shirts and sweatshirts. He is a lothario and is often made fun of when he fails to have sex with women. He maintains a flirtatious relationship with his assistant Veronica. Eli also maintains a tumultuous relationship with his father David, who he feels eats all his food and stinks up his bathroom. He is also very close with his maid, Edna, seeing her as a surrogate mother.
- Giovanni Ribisi as Warner Whittemore, Eli's business partner. He is often portrayed to be the "business" end of the video game business. He is very neurotic and maintains an estranged relationship with his wife, Camilla. He has two children with Camilla. It is revealed in episode "Double Troubles" that he is afraid of sex. His father is Crawford who often inadvertently gets Warner into trouble. His best friend is Eli, but they can both get into conflicts over various subjects.
- Peter Riegert as David Sachs, Eli's dad. He left Eli as a child and returns to live in Eli's apartment where he is generally seen sitting on the couch, eating, watching television, or fighting with Edna. A recurring joke in the series is his intestinal problems. He is lethargic, sardonic, impatient, and grumpy towards most characters, but has a friendship with Crawford. David seemingly does not care for Eli, but is shown that he is supportive of his son, such as stealing comic books for Eli, marrying Edna to keep her from being deported, and taking a job as a mall Santa to buy Eli a Christmas present. As revealed in "Have a Heart... Attack", he is 65 years old.
- Martin Mull as Crawford Whittemore, Warner's dad. He is portrayed as a failed businessman, but continues to try to launch his career. A recurring joke in the series is his bad investments. He often means well toward his son, but ends up ruining his life in the same way. Crawford is prone to racial slurs, which he appears not to notice to be racist.
- Brenda Song as Veronica, Eli's and Warner's assistant. She is a sarcastic and cunning person, as shown when she gives herself a raise without her bosses' permission. She is proven to be tricky as she manages to outsmart Eli and Warner into jumping into a chimney. She works closely with both Eli and Warner, but has a closer relationship with Eli. Her ethnicity is often made fun of by other characters, as Eli teases her for having a cousin named "Wai Mi" (pronounced like the English words "why me?"). In the episode "The Glitch that Stole Christmas", it is revealed she only drinks alcohol once a year.
- Tonita Castro as Edna, Eli's maid. She is Mexican and an illegal immigrant. She is the constant rival and friend of David, Eli's dad. In the episode "Doubles Trouble", it is revealed that she is an expert of Virtual Table Tennis. In the episode "Mister Edna", Edna is nearly deported. David marries her to avoid deportation and promptly divorces her. She often speaks Spanish throughout the show.
- Vanessa Lachey as Camilla Whittemore, Warner's wife. She acts as the person to calm Warner down through his many emotional outbreaks. She often tries to get Warner to do new things. In the episode "Comic Book Issues", it is revealed that she never farts in front of Warner. She has two children with Warner.

== Development and production ==
The cast of Dads

The series first appeared as part of Fox development slate in September 2012. In January 2013, Fox bypassed the pilot order and green-lit Dads with a six-episode, straight-to-series order. The pilot was directed by Mark Cendrowski and written by Alec Sulkin and Wellesley Wild, who also serve as executive producers alongside Seth MacFarlane. In May 2013, Fox extended the episode order from six to thirteen episodes. In October 2013, the network ordered six more scripts of the series. Later that same month, Dads was picked up for a full season with nine episodes. On December 6, 2013, Fox trimmed the series' first season from 22 to 19 episodes.

=== Casting ===
Casting announcements began in January 2013, with Brenda Song first to be cast in the role of Veronica, Warner and Eli's odd assistant. Tommy Dewey was the next actor cast in the series as Warner, Eli's work partner and married father of two, whose father Crawford moves in with him. Peter Riegert was then added to the cast in the role of David, Eli's father, who abandoned Eli and his mother when he was five, and is now trying to rebuild their relationship. In mid-March, Martin Mull joined the series as Crawford, Warner's father, a man who's always been the bane of Warner's existence. Tonita Castro followed in the role of Edna, Eli's hard-drinking, outspoken maid. Seth Green and Erin Pineda were the last actors cast in the series. Green signed on to play the remaining lead role of Eli, a man who hasn't grown up but who built a successful video game business with Warner. Pineda joined the series as Camilla, Warner's wife with whom he has a four-year-old son and one-year-old daughter. In late March, it was announced that Vanessa Lachey would replace Erin Pineda in the role of Warner's wife, Camilla. In April, Giovanni Ribisi replaced Tommy Dewey as Warner after the taping of the pilot.

== Release ==
On May 7, 2014, Fox canceled the series after one season before the final episode aired on July 16, 2014. The series premiered in Australia on Eleven on May 18, 2014.

On November 11, 2014, Olive Films released the entire series on DVD.

== Reception ==
=== Critical reception ===
Dads was universally panned by critics. It holds a score of 15 out of 100 on review aggregator Metacritic, based on 28 critics, indicating "overwhelming dislike". It also holds a rare 0% rating on review aggregator Rotten Tomatoes, where the consensus reads, "A near-total disaster, Dads makes the fatal mistake of believing its racist gags can lend an edge to its aggressively predictable writing and unlikable characters."

Tim Goodman of The Hollywood Reporter wrote, "there's not much to say about this retro stink bomb that, with its overly eager laugh track and broad-but-not-funny humor, might have been a better fit on CBS. (Because if it was, it would make all those race-and-vagina jokes on 2 Broke Girls look like Seinfeld material.)" Matt Zoller Seitz of Vulture wrote, "Dads — don't watch it. That way you won't have to roll your eyes back into your skull when Crawford and Peter Riegert, who plays Green's dad, battle to avoid paying a lunch check by fanning or blowing it across the table — this show's notion of brilliant physical comedy. And you won't have to cringe when the lads encourage an Asian co-worker to dress up as a 'sexy Asian schoolgirl' to appeal to potential Chinese investors, or when the show tries to get laughs from cultural stereotypes while half-assedly pretending the joke's on our heroes for being so ignorant."

=== Ratings ===
Dads premiered to a 2.2 rating in the key Adults 18-49 demographic. In week two, it fell about 32% to a 1.5 rating.

These results were viewed by experts as mediocre. At television ratings analysis website TV by the Numbers, Dads premiered at On the Bubble on the Bubble Watch and had a de facto canceled status on the Renew/Cancel Index, until it was cancelled on May 7, 2014.

== Episodes ==
No.	Title	Directed by	Written by	Original release date	Prod. code	US viewers (millions)
1	"Pilot"	Mark Cendrowski	Alec Sulkin & Wellesley Wild	September 17, 2013	1AWS79	5.76
Eli (Seth Green) and Warner (Giovanni Ribisi), two successful business partners, have their lives completely changed when their fathers, David (Peter Riegert) and Crawford (Martin Mull), respectively, move in with them.
2	"Heckuva Job, Brownie"	Ted Wass	Julius Sharpe	September 24, 2013	1AWS02	3.65
When Ghost Child Games needs a new idea for a video game, Warner and Veronica encourage Eli to get stoned on pot brownies. The guys end up using the treats to get along better with their dads.
3	"Clean on Me"	Ted Wass	Julie Thacker-Scully	October 1, 2013	1AWS01	3.40
Eli realizes he should treat Edna better when he lends her to Warner. In the meantime, Veronica hires Crawford as an intern at the office.
4	"Funny Girl"	Mark Cendrowski	John Viener	October 8, 2013	1AWS04	3.10
Eli dates Veronica's friend Anne (Allison Munn), an attractive but annoying comedian, with Eli having her move in to spite David. Meanwhile, a recording session for the company's new video game "Occue-Die Wall Street" gets out of hand when Crawford tries to help Warner with some "businessman" voice-over work.
5	"Oldfinger"	Gerry Cohen	Tom Gammill & Max Pross	October 15, 2013	1AWS05	3.42
Concerned about their dads' health, Warner and Eli takes them to get physicals, but Warner begins to worry about his mortality when the doctor dies before giving him his test results.
6	"My Dad's Hotter Than Your Dad"	Bob Koherr	Tom Gammill & Max Pross	October 22, 2013	1AWS03	3.59
Since Eli has a history of being a Human Resources liability, Warner hires Janet (Lee Garlington), an older woman as a new assistant at the office, but the plan backfires when David and Crawford compete for her affections.
7	"Foul Play"	Mark Cendrowski	Julius Sharpe	November 5, 2013	1AWS06	3.65
When David inadvertently brings bedbugs into the house, he and Eli are forced to sleep at Ghost Child Games. In the meantime, Camilla is cast as the lead in a local play and receives unexpected help from Crawford.
8	"Doubles Trouble"	Gerry Cohen	John Viener	November 12, 2013	1AWS07	3.19
Eli begins to question his and Warner's friendship when Warner makes Camilla his partner in the annual Virtual Tennis Tournament, while Crawford and David attempt to prove they can make real friends.
9	"Comic Book Issues"	Scott Ellis	David A. Goodman	November 19, 2013	1AWS09	3.21
David's disrespect for Eli's comic book collection leads Eli to place them in a storage unit that gets broken into at the same time Crawford buys them as a gift for Warner. When everyone realizes the comic books belong to Eli, Warner refuses to give them back without a fight.
10	"Dad Abuse"	Mark Cendrowski	Julie Thacker-Scully	November 26, 2013	1AWS08	3.18
Eli and Warner mistakenly cause an investigation of elder abuse, leading to their dads being put in foster care. At first, they're happy about the situation, but their happiness turns to guilt as they make up a plan to rescue their fathers. In the meantime, Crawford's childish, sloppy habits get between Warner and Camilla.
11	"The Glitch That Stole Christmas"	David Trainer	Maggie Mull	December 3, 2013	1AWS10	3.35
Eli and Warner fire one of their employees before the holiday season, but the ex-game designer includes an offensive word in the guys' family-friendly Christmas game for revenge. Meanwhile, Edna talks David into getting a job as a mall Santa so he'll earn enough money to get Eli a present.
12	"Mister Edna"	Mark Cendrowski	Julius Sharpe	January 7, 2014	1AWS11	3.64
David exposes Edna as an illegal immigrant during an immigration-related bust of a sweat shop in the building. To save his maid from deportation, Eli forces his father to marry her and enlists Warner to help plan the wedding. It isn't long before Eli regrets his plan, as Warner goes way overboard on the wedding arrangements while Edna steps into the role of wife and mother.
13	"Eli Nightingale"	Kelly Cronin	John Viener	January 14, 2014	1AWS12	3.20
Warner tells Veronica to go home since she's sick and he's a germaphobe. Eli takes care of Veronica, hoping that his kindness will lead to them sleeping together.
14	"Bully Gene"	Gerry Cohen	Julius Sharpe	January 21, 2014	1AWS13	3.88
Eli dates Elsa (Jamie-Lynn Sigler), a single mother whose 12-year-old son, Gene, bullies Eli and causes trouble by stealing the prototype for the latest Ghost Child game. Meanwhile, Warner picks fake fights with Camilla in order to sleep on the couch, which he finds more comfortable than the bed.
15	"Baby Face"	Gerry Cohen	Julius Sharpe	January 28, 2014	1AWS14	3.96
Warner is left home alone with Crawford when Camilla goes out of town to visit her sister, so he sends him and David to a hotel where the two dads are mistaken for a gay couple on their honeymoon. Meanwhile, Eli gets Warner involved in facebook, which causes Maria (Maria Thayer), an old girlfriend of Warner's, to show up at the office with an unusual proposition.
16	"Warner's Got It Made"	Gerry Cohen	John Viener	February 4, 2014	1AWS15	3.73
Eli and Warner hire Johnny (Ray Abruzzo), a mob boss to consult on a new mafia game in development at Ghost Child Games.
17	"Enemies of Bill"	Mark Cendrowski	Julius Sharpe	February 11, 2014	1AWS16	2.70
Camilla insists that the Whittemores quit drinking after Crawford gets too drunk and accidentally ruins the couch. Suddenly bored, Crawford takes to writing songs and has Warner join him on guitar. Meanwhile, Edna lashes out at David for stealing change out of her jar, but she and Eli then find him using the change at a claw machine in an attempt to win back a special toy he threw out when Eli was a child.
18	"Have a Heart... Attack!"	Kelly Cronin	John Viener	February 11, 2014	1AWS17	2.49
Eli and Edna both ignore David's constant complaining, until he ends up in the hospital following a heart attack and Eli realizes how much he still loves the old man. Crawford has an ankle band removed and is legally allowed to leave the building. Warner and Camilla immediately find a retiree condo for him, but Warner soon realizes that he too misses his dad. Meanwhile, Veronica gets engaged to Colt (Ryan Sypek) which makes Eli regret never saying how he truly feels about her.
19	"Jerk in the Box"	David Trainer	Julius Sharpe	July 16, 2014	1AWS18	1.38
Eli is still dealing with jealousy over Veronica's engagement to Colt, while David plans his own funeral.

== See also ==
- 2013–14 United States network television schedule
