= Fired Up (Randy Houser album) =

Studio album by Randy Houser
- Released: March 11, 2016
- Studio: The Tracking Room, Sound Stage Studios, The Monostary, The Insanery, Little Big Sound and RTBGV (Nashville, Tennessee)
- Genre: Country; country pop
- Length: 1:00:14
- Label: Stoney Creek
- Producer: Derek George

Randy Houser chronology
How Country Feels (2013)	Fired Up (2016)	Magnolia (2019)

Singles from Fired Up
- 1. "We Went" Released: May 18, 2015; 2. "Song Number 7" Released: March 28, 2016; 3. "Chasing Down a Good Time" Released: July 18, 2016

Fired Up is the fourth studio album by American country music artist Randy Houser. It was released on March 11, 2016 via Stoney Creek. The lead single, "We Went", was released to radio on May 18, 2015 and became Houser's third Number One hit on the Billboard Country Airplay chart. "Song Number 7" and "Chasing Down a Good Time" were released as the album's second and third singles, respectively, in 2016.

== Reception ==
=== Commercial ===
The album debuted on the Billboard 200 at No. 15, and no 3 on the Top Country Albums chart, selling 21,000 in the first week. The album has sold 53,400 copies in the US as of July 2016.

== Track listing ==
No.	Title	Writer(s)	Length
1.	"Back"	Jeffrey Steele, Bridgette Tatum	3:34
2.	"We Went"	Justin Wilson; Matt Rogers; John King	3:00
3.	"Chasing Down a Good Time"	Randy Houser; Steele; Anthony Smith	3:33
4.	"Senior Year"	Houser, Rob Hatch	3:59
5.	"Mine Tonight"	Dallas Davidson; Rhett Akins; Ben Hayslip	3:27
6.	"Lucky Me"	Houser; Davidson; Craig Wiseman	3:43
7.	"Song Number 7"	Wilson; Hayslip; Chris Janson	3:00
8.	"Before Midnight"	Houser; Shane Minor; Derek George	3:15
9.	"True"	Houser; Hatch	3:50
10.	"Yesterday's Whiskey"	Brice Long; Kylie Sackley	3:44
11.	"Fired Up"	Hatch; Davidson	3:34
12.	"A Little Bit Older"	Neil Thrasher; Michael Dulaney; Tony Martin	2:49
13.	"Gotta Get You Home"	Davidson; Ashley Gorley; Kelley Lovelace	3:43
14.	"Hot Beer and Cold Women"	Brett Warren; Brad Warren; Travis Meadows	3:46
15.	"Same Ole Saturday Night"	Davidson; Hayslip; Martin Johnson	3:32
16.	"One Way" (bonus track)	Chris Stapleton; Lee Thomas Miller	3:43
17.	"Whiskeysippi River" (bonus track)	Josh Jenkins; Matt Jenkins; Trevor Rosen	4:02

== Personnel ==
- Randy Houser – vocals
- Dave Cohen – keyboards
- Steve Nathan – keyboards
- Jeff Roach – keyboards
- John Henry Trinko – keyboards
- Casey Wood – keyboards, percussion
- Derek George – programming, acoustic guitar, electric guitar, banjo, backing vocals
- Alicia Hoffman – programming
- Jeff King – electric guitar
- Troy Lancaster – electric guitar
- B. James Lowry – acoustic guitar
- Rob McNelley – electric guitar
- Scotty Sanders – steel guitar
- Lee Hendricks – bass
- Michael Rhodes – bass
- Kevin Murphy – drums
- Lonnie Wilson – drums
- Sari Reist – cello (1, 16)
- Monisa Angell – viola (1, 16)
- David Angell – violin (1, 16)
- David Davidson – violin (1, 16)
- Larry Hall – string arrangements (1, 16)
- Wes Hightower – backing vocals
- Chris Stapleton – backing vocals
- Russell Terrell – backing vocals

=== Production ===
- Derek George – producer, recording, additional recording, digital editing
- Casey Wood – recording, mixing, additional recording, digital editing
- Bobby Shin – string recording (1, 16)
- Russell Terrell – additional recording
- Rebekah Long – recording assistant
- Kam Luchterham – recording assistant
- Zach Abend – digital editing
- Andrew Mendelson – mastering at Georgetown Masters (Nashville, Tennessee)
- Mike "Frog" Griffith – production coordinator
- Glenn Sweitzer – art direction, design
- Jen Joe – creative director
- Ryan Smith – photography
- Fitzgerald Hartley Co. – management

== Charts ==
=== Weekly charts ===
Chart (2016)	Peak position
Canadian Albums (Billboard)	18
US Billboard 200	15
US Top Country Albums (Billboard)	3
US Independent Albums (Billboard)	2

=== Year-end charts ===
Chart (2016)	Position
US Top Country Albums (Billboard)	49
