= Casey James =

American singer-songwriter (born 1982)

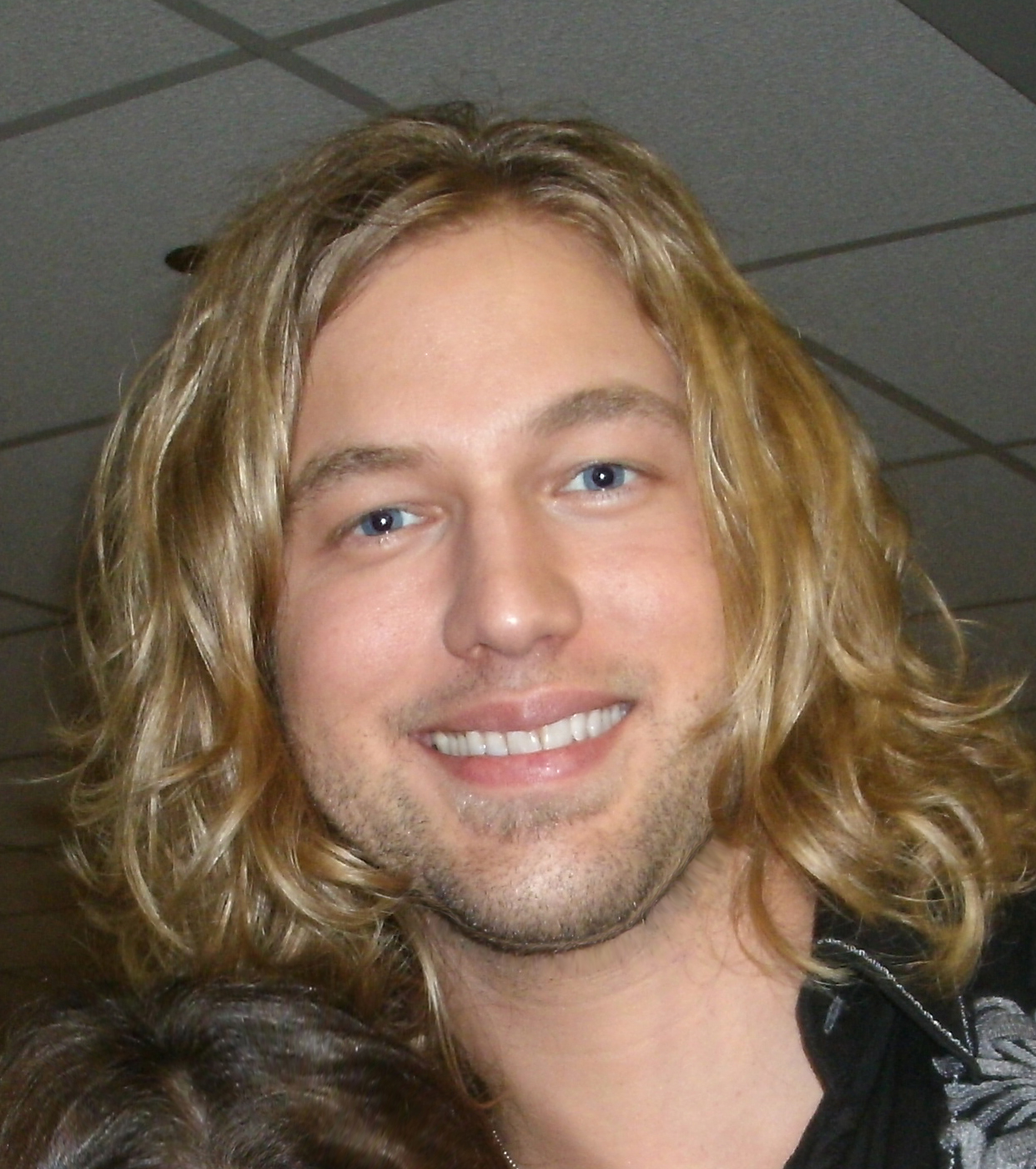
- James in 2010

Background information
- Born: Casey Everett James; May 31, 1982 (age 44); Plano, Texas, U.S.
- Origin: Fort Worth, Texas
- Genres: Pop, country, rock, blues
- Occupations: Singer, songwriter
- Instruments: Vocals, guitar, mandolin
- Years active: 2008–present
- Labels: BNA (2010-12); 19 (2010-2015); Columbia (2012-2015)
- Website: www.caseyjamesoffical.com

Casey Everett James (born May 31, 1982) is an American singer and guitarist who was the third-place finalist on the ninth season of American Idol and is an independent recording artist. He released his eponymous album in March 2012 from which three singles, "Let's Don't Call It a Night", "Crying on a Suitcase", and "The Good Life" were released. In October 2014, James released "Fall Apart" as the first single from a planned second studio album, but Sony opted not to release the record and they split ways. In 2017, James released his second album, Strip It Down, to critical acclaim.

== Early life ==
James was born on May 31, 1982, in Plano, Texas, to Debra "Bybee" and Beau James. The family moved to Princeton, Texas, but after his parents divorced when James was about four, his mother raised him and his brother Billy Cole in Cool, Texas. James had a bad reaction to his pertussis (whooping cough) vaccine when he was an infant, and his family feared brain damage. According to his mother, however, she realized that he would be all right and was going to be musical when he started humming the theme song from M*A*S*H.

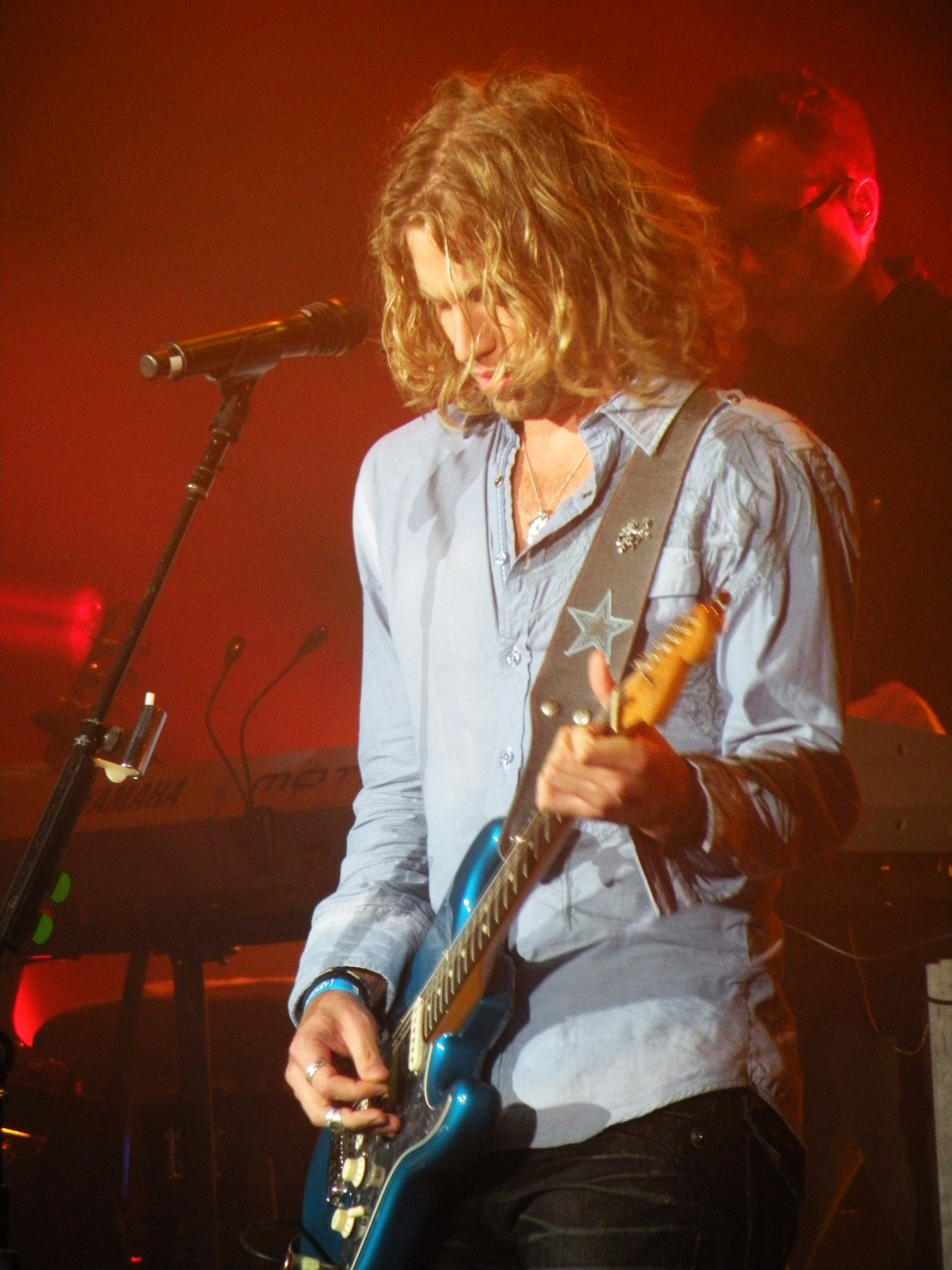
James performing on the American Idol Live! tour in Denver, Colorado, on August 23, 2010

James started playing the guitar at 13 and within a year was playing on stage. James has played acoustic sets with his mother, and blues with his older brother. He has also played with country and rock bands. At the age of 21, he was in a serious motorcycle accident that nearly ended his life. He was told by his doctor that he would no longer be able to play guitar, a medical prediction that proved untrue. During the American Idol hometown visits, James returned to the hospital where he was treated for his injuries and presented an autographed guitar to his surgeon, Dr. Cory Collinge.

Before American Idol, he played with his band, The Casey James Band, consisting of James, his brother, Billy Cole (bass), and Jacy McCann (drums). They recorded four songs, including the first song that James ever wrote, "Freezing," back in 2002.

== Musical influences ==
James cites blues guitarist Doyle Bramhall II as a major musical influence and whom he would most like to perform with in his Idol Q&A. Another major influence is Stevie Ray Vaughan; James named Vaughan's In the Beginning (1992) as a formative album in his early years.

I got an album called “In the Beginning” and I learned every note on it, which was easier to do because it was early on in his career [it was recorded in 1980]. I learned all those notes and it opened me up to the blues. When you look what he was doing, a lot of it was covers, and then you go back and start listening to those guys -- the originals Albert King, Freddie King, Albert Collins -- those influences changed me, too.

Other influences cited in the article are southern rockers Lynyrd Skynyrd and Pearl Jam.

== American Idol ==
James was a contestant on American Idol during its ninth season. He made it to the Top 3 before being eliminated on May 19, 2010. James had tried out for and been selected to compete in the ninth season of Idol in 2009 in spite of the fact that he had never seen the show. He was the oldest contestant to be selected for the Top 24 of the ninth season at the age of 27. James was voted off of the competition on May 19, 2010, and finished in third place. During the finale of American Idol, he performed a duet of "Every Rose Has Its Thorn" with Bret Michaels.

USA Today music critic Brian Mansfield suggested that James was "the best guitar player the show [American Idol] has seen."

=== Performances ===
Episode	Theme	Song choice	Original artist	Order #	Result
Audition	N/A	"Slow Dancing in a Burning Room"	John Mayer	N/A	Advanced
Hollywood	First Solo	"I Don't Need No Doctor"	Ray Charles	N/A	Advanced
Hollywood	Group Round	"Closer"	Ne-Yo	N/A	Advanced
Hollywood	Second Solo	"Bubbly"	Colbie Caillat	N/A	Advanced
Top 24 (12 Men)	Billboard Hot 100 Hits	"Heaven"	Bryan Adams	11	Safe
Top 20 (10 Men)	Billboard Hot 100 Hits	"I Don't Want to Be"	Gavin DeGraw	3	Safe
Top 16 (8 Men)	Billboard Hot 100 Hits	"You'll Think of Me"	Keith Urban	5	Safe
Top 12	The Rolling Stones	"It's All Over Now"	The Valentinos	3	Safe
Top 11	Billboard Number 1 Hits	"The Power of Love"	Huey Lewis and the News	9	Safe
Top 10	R&B/Soul	"Hold On, I'm Comin'"	Sam & Dave	2	Safe
Top 9	Lennon–McCartney	"Jealous Guy"	John Lennon	7	Safe
Top 9^{1}	Elvis Presley	"Lawdy Miss Clawdy"	Lloyd Price	9	Safe
Top 7	Inspirational	"Don't Stop"	Fleetwood Mac	1	Bottom 3^{2}
Top 6	Shania Twain	"Don't!"	Shania Twain	3	Bottom 3^{3}
Top 5	Frank Sinatra	"Blue Skies"	Belle Baker	2	Safe
Top 4	Songs of the Cinema	Solo "Mrs. Robinson" — The Graduate	Simon & Garfunkel	4	Safe
Top 4	Songs of the Cinema	Duet "Have You Ever Really Loved a Woman?" — Don Juan DeMarco with Michael Lynche	Bryan Adams	6	Safe
Top 3	Contestant's Choice	"OK, It's Alright with Me"	Eric Hutchinson	1	Eliminated
Top 3	Judge's Choice^{4}	"Daughters"	John Mayer	4	Eliminated

- ^Note 1 Due to the judges using their one save to save Michael Lynche, the Top 9 remained intact for another week.
- ^Note 2 When Ryan Seacrest announced the results for this particular night, James was among the Bottom 3 but declared safe second, as Tim Urban was eliminated.
- ^Note 3 When Ryan Seacrest announced the results for this particular night, James was among the Bottom 3 but declared safe second, as Siobhan Magnus was eliminated.
- ^Note 4 Song selected by Randy Jackson and Kara DioGuardi.

== Post-Idol ==
James joined the rest of the Top 10 on the American Idols LIVE! tour. His four-song set included "I Got Mine" by The Black Keys, "Don't" by Shania Twain, "It's All Over Now" by Bobby Womack, and "Have You Ever Really Loved a Woman" by Bryan Adams alongside fellow contestant Michael Lynche.

In March 2011 he opened for Sugarland on their The Incredible Machine Tour and has been playing other solo and opening gigs including performing at the ACM Awards fan party and 2011 CMA Fest.

=== 2012: Casey James ===
On August 17, 2010, it was announced that James had signed with Sony Music Nashville and his debut album would be released on BNA Records/19 in 2011. Sony Music Nashville Chairman and CEO Gary Overton said: "We at Sony Music Nashville are incredibly excited about signing CASEY JAMES. I flew to NEW YORK to see him 'live' with the American Idol Tour and I was blown away with his voice, guitar playing and stage presence...and so were the thousands of fans in the amphitheatre. He has honed his skills as a showman with his years of performing live on stage! I can't wait to get him into the studio to begin recording his debut album." James worked with country songwriter Tom Douglas. Douglas has said of James that "he's the real deal. He's a great singer and great guitar player, so I'm looking forward to writing with him." James collaborated with some of country music's notable songwriters including Aimee Mayo, Alabama's Randy Owen, Sugarland's Kristian Bush, and Delbert McClinton,

James first single, "Let's Don't Call It a Night", was released on August 15, 2011, and sold 5,000 copies in its debut week. James co-wrote "Let's Don't Call It a Night" with Brice Long and Terry McBride. James' self-titled debut CD was released on March 20, 2012, on BNA Records. James co-wrote nine of the CD's eleven tracks and co-produced the CD with Chris Lindsey.

On June 4, 2012, James was moved to Columbia Nashville, another division of Sony Music Nashville, after the closure of BNA Records. Shortly after, his second single "Crying on a Suitcase" was released on June 18, with a music video released in August.

=== 2014-present ===
In October 2014, James released "Fall Apart" as the first single from a second studio album. However, Sony decided not to release this album and James and Sony separated. As an independent artist, James launched a Kickstarter in October 2016 to raise at least $30,000 for his new album, and surpassed this goal. The album, Strip It Down, received rave reviews. Rainey Wetnight of Blues Blast Magazine called the album "outstanding" and highlighted the track "Bulletproof", which features Delbert McClinton. Alexandra Veltri of Bluesrockreview.com gave the album eight stars out of ten. She praised James for his vocals and guitar playing, while writing, "Every note and lyric is in service to the song, the album, and the listener." As of 2022, James is a member of the group Texas Hill, along with Craig Wayne Boyd and Adam Wakefield.

== Personal life ==
James had been convicted of three traffic violations and jailed prior to appearing on American Idol. He was also involved in serious motorcycle accident in 2004 that left him with a broken left arm and wrist, and a right femur with multiple compound fracture, and he was in a wheelchair for six months.

In 2005, James married Kellie Marie whom he met when he was nineteen at Leaning Tree Church in Mineral Wells, Texas. The marriage however did not last and they divorced two years later. In August 2014, Casey married Kelli Pentzer and in February 2016 they had a daughter, in December 2017 they had a son and in October 2019 they had another daughter.

== Discography ==
=== Studio albums ===
Title	Album details	Peak chart positions		Sales
Title	Album details	US Country	US	Sales
Casey James	Release date: March 20, 2012; Label: BNA Records/19; Formats: CD, digital download	2	23	US: 77,000
Strip It Down	Release date: June 9, 2017; Independent Release; Formats: CD, digital download	—	—	

=== Singles ===
Year	Single	Peak chart positions			Sales	Album
Year	Single	US Country	US Country Airplay	US	Sales	Album
2011	"Let's Don't Call It a Night"	21		—^{a}	US: 106,000	Casey James
2012	"Crying on a Suitcase"	24	14	88	US: 337,000	Casey James
2013	"The Good Life"	—	57	—		Casey James
2015	"Fall Apart"	—	46	—		—N/a
"—" denotes releases that did not chart

- ^Note a Let's Don't Call It a Night reached No. 11 in the Bubbling Under Hot 100 Singles chart.

=== Music videos ===
Year	Video	Director
2011	"Let's Don't Call It a Night"	Roman White
2012	"Crying on a Suitcase"	TK McKamy
2015	"Fall Apart"	

== Awards and nominations ==
Year	Association	Category	Result
2012	American Country Awards	Music Video of the Year: New Artist - "Let's Don't Call It a Night"	Nominated
