= John King (country singer) =

American singer-songwriter

- John King at Yosemite National Park in 2018

Background information
- Born: John Lee King; Demorest, Georgia
- Origin: Nashville, Tennessee
- Genres: Country
- Occupation: Singer-songwriter
- Instrument: Vocals/Guitar
- Years active: 2014–present
- Label: Starstruck Records
- Website: www.johnkingcountry.com

John King is an American country music singer and songwriter.

King was born and raised in Demorest, Georgia.

He worked construction jobs as a teenager and was heavily influenced by Country, Rock and Southern rock artists. King later graduated from University of Georgia before signing his first record deal with Black River Entertainment (2014-2016).

His debut single, "Tonight Tonight", was released in mid-2014 and featured on the NFL's Thursday Night Football on CBS. Taste of Country reviewed it favorably, saying that it is "a great hook over a strong beat, all built sturdy country voice. King solidly follows in the footsteps of many modern country hit-makers, unveiling a debut single that is fun and catchy and will immediately have one hitting repeat for a second listen." It entered Top 40 on Country Airplay for the chart dated September 13, 2014.

King co-wrote Randy Houser's single "We Went" with Justin Wilson, Matt Rogers, the song reached #1 on Mediabase and Billboard Country Airplay Charts. It also scored him his first ASCAP Songwriter Award in 2016. King also penned the first Hootie and The Blowfish song to be released since 2005. “Rollin” is featured on their new album, "Imperfect Circle" that was released November 1, 2019.

The video for King's 2017 "I Still Pick Up" was voted Top 10 on the CMTcountdown. King signed Sony/ATV Nashville in April 2018.

King’s single, “Try Saying Goodbye” pulls from his storytelling prowess. It has already garnered more than 15 million streams and 30 major market radio adds including Atlanta, Boston and Seattle. It was named one of Rolling Stone’s Top 10 Country Songs, earning features from Amazon, Whiskey Riff, Taste of Country and more.

He released his debut album Always Gonna Be You on October 8th 2021. The Album was well received with American Songwriter reviewing it favourably saying "The 10-track collection establishes the Georgia native as a boundless artist with an undeniable talent for truth-telling."

King recently broke 50 Million All Time Streams and tours countless dates with the likes of Blake Shelton, Jason Aldean, Sam Hunt and Travis Tritt.

== Discography ==
=== Extended plays ===
Title	EP details
On Your Lips EP	Released: March 3, 2015; Label: Black River Entertainment; Format: Digital download

=== Singles ===
Title	Year	Peak chart positions	Album
Title	Year	US Country Airplay	Album
2014	"Tonight Tonight"	39	Single only
2015	"On Your Lips"	-	On Your Lips EP
2017	"I Still Pick Up"	-	Single only
2018	"Never Wanna Be"	-	Single only
2018	"Ride Forever"	-	Single only
2018	"Heat Wave"	-	Single only
2019	"Try Saying Goodbye"	-	Single only
2019	"Close"	-	Single only
"—" denotes releases that did not chart
