= Let's Don't Call It a Night =

Single by Casey James

from the album Casey James
- Released: August 15, 2011
- Genre: Country
- Length: 3:26
- Label: BNA, 19
- Songwriters: Casey James; Brice Long; Terry McBride
- Producers: Casey James; Chris Lindsey

Casey James singles chronology
"Let's Don't Call It a Night" (2011)	"Crying on a Suitcase" (2012)

"Let's Don't Call It a Night" is a first song co-written and recorded by the American country music singer and American Idol season 9 finalist, Casey James. It was released in August 2011 as the first single from his album Casey James, released by BNA Records in March 2012. James wrote the song with Terry McBride and Brice Long.

== Critical reception ==
Jeff Lincoln of Country Standard Time said that the song "has a charming, sultry groove. Exchanging sharp Dobro twangs with understatedly suggestive lyrics, it's something Ronnie Milsap may have plucked for himself 30 years ago". Giving it three stars out of five, Billy Dukes of Taste of Country called the opening lyrics "vapid" but praised the chorus, also saying, "The mood is right."

== Music video ==
Roman White directed the music video.

== Chart performance ==
Chart (2011–2012)	Peak position
US Hot Country Songs (Billboard)	21
US Billboard Bubbling Under Hot 100	11

=== Year-end charts ===
Chart (2012)	Position
US Country Songs (Billboard)	76
