= Crying on a Suitcase =

Single by Casey James

from the album Casey James
- Released: June 18, 2012
- Genre: Country
- Length: 3:41
- Label: BNA, 19
- Songwriters: Lee Thomas Miller; Neil Thrasher; Tom Shapiro
- Producers: Casey James; Chris Lindsey

Casey James singles chronology
"Let's Don't Call It a Night" (2011)	"Crying on a Suitcase" (2012)	"The Good Life" (2013)

"Crying on a Suitcase" is a song written by Neil Thrasher, Tom Shapiro and Lee Thomas Miller, and recorded by American country music artist Casey James. It was released in June 2012 as the second single from James' self-titled debut album.

== Content ==
"Crying on a Suitcase" is a midtempo song about a male who is trying to convince himself to catch up to a former lover at the airport and give the relationship a second chance before her airplane leaves.

James said that he enjoyed the song the first time that he heard it, but also said that he was reluctant to record it because "the guy who sang the demo really sang it".

== Critical reception ==
Billy Dukes of Taste of Country gave the song 3 stars out of 5, saying that James' singing was "appropriately urgent" but that the storyline made it "a difficult song to get into". He also criticized the melody as "choppy".

== Music video ==
The music video was directed by TK McKamy and premiered in August 2012.

== Charts ==
It became his first top 20 hit in January 2013.

=== Weekly charts ===
Chart (2012–2013)	Peak position
US Billboard Hot 100	88
US Hot Country Songs (Billboard)	24
US Country Airplay (Billboard)	14

=== Year-end charts ===
Chart (2012)	Position
US Country Songs (Billboard)	77

Chart (2013)	Position
US Country Airplay (Billboard)	78
