= How Country Feels =

Studio album by Randy Houser
- Released: January 22, 2013
- Recorded: 2012–2013
- Studio: The Monostary, The Insanery and OmniSound Studios (Nashville, Tennessee)
- Genre: Country
- Length: 56:30
- Label: Stoney Creek
- Producer: Derek George

Randy Houser chronology
They Call Me Cadillac (2010)	How Country Feels (2013)	Fired Up (2016)

Singles from How Country Feels
- 1. "How Country Feels" Released: May 7, 2012; 2. "Runnin' Outta Moonlight" Released: March 4, 2013; 3. "Goodnight Kiss" Released: September 23, 2013; 4. "Like a Cowboy" Released: May 19, 2014

Professional ratings
Review scores
Source	Rating
AllMusic	3/5 stars
Country Weekly	A−
Taste of Country	4/5 stars

How Country Feels is the third studio album by American country music artist Randy Houser. It was released on January 22, 2013, through Stoney Creek Records. Houser wrote seven of the album's fifteen tracks. The album was produced by Derek George, a former member of the bands Pearl River and Williams Riley. The album's first single, the title track, became Houser's first Number One song on the Billboard Country Airplay chart. Its second single, "Runnin' Outta Moonlight", was released to country radio on March 4, 2013. Both singles were certified Platinum by the RIAA. The album's third single, "Goodnight Kiss", was released to country radio on September 23, 2013. The album's fourth single, "Like a Cowboy", was released to country radio on May 19, 2014. The third and fourth singles were certified Gold.

The album had sold 228,000 copies in the US as of January 2015.

== Content ==
The album features a duet with Kristy Lee Cook on "Wherever Love Goes," which was later re-recorded and released in August 2013 as a single with Cook as the lead artist and Houser as the featured artist.

== Critical reception ==
Giving How Country Feels an A-minus, Tammy Ragusa of Country Weekly praised the "authenticity" of Houser's voice and said that the "project is overflowing with hooky, singalong tracks." Taste of Country gave the album four stars out of five, saying that it was an "even effort with no bruises, but few moments that take your breath away," and saying Houser proved he "is one of country music’s top male vocalists."

== Track listing ==
No.	Title	Writer(s)	Length
1.	"Runnin' Outta Moonlight"	Dallas Davidson, Ashley Gorley, Kelley Lovelace	3:13
2.	"Growin' Younger"	Randy Houser, Brett James, Justin Weaver	4:53
3.	"Top of the World"	Rob Hatch, Vicky McGehee, Lance Miller, Jason Sellers	3:17
4.	"The Singer"	Drew Smith, Trent Willmon	4:20
5.	"Power of a Song"	Houser, Cory Batten, Kent Blazy	3:42
6.	"Absolutely Nothing"	Lee Brice, Joe Leathers, McGehee	3:02
7.	"Wherever Love Goes" (with Kristy Lee Cook)	Sellers, Neil Thrasher, Paul Jenkins	4:16
8.	"Like a Cowboy"	Houser, Brice Long	4:22
9.	"How Country Feels"	McGehee, Wendell Mobley, Thrasher	3:05
10.	"Along for the Ride"	Zac Brown, Levi Lowrey, Houser	3:35
11.	"Sunshine on the Line"	Davidson, Houser	3:20
12.	"Goodnight Kiss"	Hatch, Sellers, Houser	3:26
13.	"Let's Not Let It"	Ash Bowers, Lisa Hentrich, Thrasher	3:10
14.	"Shine"	Mobley, Thrasher, Trent Summar	4:57
15.	"Route 3 Box 250 D"	Rhett Akins, Ben Hayslip, Houser	3:52
Total length:			56:30

== Personnel ==
Musicians and Vocals

- Randy Houser – vocals
- Derek George – keyboards, programming, acoustic guitar, electric guitar, harmonica, backing vocals
- Steve Nathan – keyboards
- John Henry Trinko – keyboards
- Casey Wood – keyboards, accordion, percussion
- Tom Bukovac – electric guitar
- J.T. Corenflos – electric guitar
- Troy Lancaster – electric guitar
- B. James Lowry – acoustic guitar
- Rob McNelley – electric guitar
- James Mitchell – electric guitar
- Mike Johnson – pedal steel guitar
- Scotty Sanders – pedal steel guitar
- Lee Hendricks – bass
- Michael Rhodes – bass
- Lonnie Wilson – drums, percussion
- Mickey Raphael – harmonica
- Larry Hall – string arrangements
- Vanessa Campagna – backing vocals
- Kristy Lee Cook – backing vocals, vocals (7)
- Wes Hightower – backing vocals
- Russell Terrell – backing vocals

Production

- Derek George – producer, additional recording, editing
- Casey Wood – recording, mixing, additional recording, editing, production coordinator
- Elijah Sandoval – assistant engineer
- Andrew Mendelson – mastering at Georgetown Masters (Nashville, Tennessee)
- Mike Molinar – production coordinator
- Glenn Sweitzer – art direction, design, photography
- David McClister – photography
- Alicia Yantz – photography
- Tina Crawford – label copy
- Fitzgerald Hartley, Co. – management

== Chart performance ==
=== Album ===
Chart (2013)	Peak position
US Billboard 200	11
US Billboard Top Country Albums	3
US Billboard Independent Albums	3

== Certifications ==
Region	Certification	Certified units/sales
United States (RIAA)	Gold	500,000^{‡}
^{‡} Sales+streaming figures based on certification alone.
