= Anything Goes (Randy Houser album) =

Studio album by Randy Houser
- Released: November 18, 2008
- Studio: Sound Kitchen and House of Nadia (Franklin, Tennessee); East Iris Studios, Starstruck Studios and Little Big Studio (Nashville, Tennessee)
- Genre: Country
- Length: 41:20
- Label: Universal South
- Producer: Mark Wright; Cliff Audretch III

Randy Houser chronology
Anything Goes (2008)	They Call Me Cadillac (2010)

Singles from Anything Goes
- 1. "Anything Goes" Released: June 2, 2008; 2. "Boots On" Released: February 23, 2009

Professional ratings
Review scores
Source	Rating
AllMusic	3/5 stars
Engine 145	2.5/5 stars

Anything Goes is the debut studio album by American country music singer Randy Houser. It was released on November 18, 2008, via Universal South Records. The album's lead-off single, its title track, reached number 16 on the US Billboard Hot Country Songs chart. The second single, "Boots On", peaked at number 2. Houser co-wrote all but three of the songs on the album.

"Back to God" was later recorded by Reba McEntire for her 2017 album Sing It Now: Songs of Faith & Hope, from which it was released as the second single.

== Track listing ==
No.	Title	Writer(s)	Length
1.	"Boots On"	Randy Houser, Brandon Kinney	2:51
2.	"Anything Goes"	Brice Long, John Wayne Wiggins	3:04
3.	"Wild Wild West"	Angelo Petraglia, Daryl Burgess, Houser	3:31
4.	"Back to God"	Dallas Davidson, Houser	5:14
5.	"Something Real"	David Lee Murphy, Houser	4:22
6.	"My Kind of Country"	Davidson, Houser	2:55
7.	"Strange"	Chuck Jones, Chuck Cannon	3:13
8.	"Lie"	Reed Nielsen, Shane Minor, Houser	4:11
9.	"Paycheck Man"	Derek George, Danny Myrick, Houser	3:04
10.	"How Many Times"	Jon Randall, Al Anderson	4:07
11.	"I'll Sleep"	Minor, Myrick, Houser	4:48

== Personnel ==
Adapted from liner notes.

- Randy Houser – lead vocals, acoustic guitar (6, 8, 9)
- Steve Nathan – Hammond B3 organ (1, 3–5, 9), acoustic piano (2, 4, 5, 8, 10, 11)
- Kevin McKendree – Wurlitzer electric piano (6, 7), Hammond B3 organ (6, 7)
- J. T. Corenflos – electric guitar, baritone guitar (5)
- B. James Lowry – acoustic guitar (1–5), gut-string guitar (5)
- Rob McNelley – electric guitar (1–7)
- Bruce Wallace – acoustic guitar (6, 7)
- Kenny Greenberg – electric guitar (8–11)
- John Willis – acoustic guitar (8–11)
- Bryan Sutton – acoustic guitar (11)
- Paul Franklin – steel guitar (1–5, 8–11), dobro (11)
- Michael Rhodes – bass (1–5, 8–11)
- Steve Mackey – bass (6, 7)
- Lonnie Wilson – drums (1–5, 8–11)
- Nick Buda – drums (6, 7)
- Eric Darken – percussion (1–6, 8, 9, 11)
- Stuart Duncan – fiddle (11)
- David Angell – strings (4, 5)
- John Catchings – strings (4, 5)
- David Davidson – strings (4, 5)
- Kristin Wilkinson – strings (4, 5), string arrangements (4, 5)
- Stephen Lamb – copyist (4, 5)
- Wes Hightower – backing vocals (1–5, 7–9, 11)
- Kim Fleming – backing vocals (2, 4)
- Vicki Hampton – backing vocals (2, 4)
- Aaron Mason – backing vocals (2, 4)
- Cliff Audretch III – backing vocals (3)
- Vince Gill – backing vocals (10)

=== Production ===
- Cliff Audretch III – A&R, producer
- Mark Wright – producer
- Greg Droman – recording, mixing
- Adam Hull – recording assistant
- Greg Lawrence – recording assistant
- Leslie Richter – recording assistant
- Heather Strum – recording assistant
- Chris Ashburn – additional recording assistant
- Kim Daewoo – additional recording assistant
- Aaron Kasdorf – additional recording assistant
- Todd Tidwell – additional recording assistant
- Hank Williams – mastering at MasterMix (Nashville, Tennessee)
- Carie Higdon – production coordinator
- Natalie S. Moore – art direction, additional photography
- Susannah Parrish – art direction, design
- Kristin Barlowe – photography
- Fitzgerald Hartley Co. – management

== Charts ==
=== Weekly charts ===
Chart (2008)	Peak position
US Billboard 200	101
US Top Country Albums (Billboard)	21
US Heatseekers Albums (Billboard)	1

=== Year-end charts ===
Chart (2009)	Position
US Top Country Albums (Billboard)	47
