= They Call Me Cadillac =

Studio album by Randy Houser
- Released: September 21, 2010
- Genre: Country
- Length: 45:56
- Label: Show Dog-Universal Music
- Producer: Cliff Audretch III; Mark Wright

Randy Houser chronology
Anything Goes (2008)	They Call Me Cadillac (2010)	How Country Feels (2013)

Singles from They Call Me Cadillac
- 1. "Whistlin' Dixie" Released: November 2, 2009; 2. "I'm All About It" Released: April 19, 2010; 3. "A Man Like Me" Released: September 27, 2010

They Call Me Cadillac is the second studio album by American country music singer Randy Houser. It was released September 21, 2010, by Show Dog-Universal Music. It includes the singles "Whistlin' Dixie", "I'm All About It", and "A Man Like Me," the former of which peaked at No. 31 on the Hot Country Songs chart in late 2009.

"Lead Me Home" was previously recorded by Jamey Johnson on his 2006 album The Dollar.

== Critical reception ==
Professional ratings
Review scores
Source	Rating
Allmusic	3.5/5 stars

Stephen Thomas Erlewine of AllMusic says that the songs are "sturdy, straight ahead tunes" and considers the material better-written than that of Anything Goes.

== Track listing ==
All tracks are written by Randy Houser, with additional co-writers as noted.

No.	Title	Writer(s)	Length
1.	"Lowdown and Lonesome"	Kendell Marvel	3:16
2.	"They Call Me Cadillac"	Brice Long	2:59
3.	"Addicted"		5:20
4.	"A Man Like Me"	Jameson Clark	3:20
5.	"Will I Always Be This Way"	Long	4:09
6.	"Out Here in the Country"	Long	3:57
7.	"Here with Me"		4:19
8.	"Whistlin' Dixie"	Kim Tribble	3:09
9.	"Somewhere South of Memphis"	Kent Blazy	5:57
10.	"If I Could Buy Me Some Time"	Shane Minor	4:37
11.	"Lead Me Home"	Craig Monday	4:53

Deluxe edition bonus tracks
No.	Title	Writer(s)	Length
12.	"I'm All About It"	Ed Hill; Mark D. Sanders	2:55
13.	"Beach to the Sand"	Minor	3:57
14.	"Big and Strong"	Dallas Davidson; Gattis	4:04

== Personnel ==
Credits provided by AllMusic

- Randy Houser – vocals, acoustic guitars
- Phil Madeira – keyboards
- John Henry Trinko – keyboards
- Keith Gattis – acoustic guitars, baritone guitar, electric guitars, percussion
- Kenny Greenberg – electric guitars
- Rob McNelley – electric guitars
- "Cowboy" Eddie Long – pedal steel guitar
- Michael Rhodes – bass
- Glenn Worf – bass
- Nick Buda – drums
- Fred Eltringham – drums
- Trey Landry – drums
- Cliff Audretch III – percussion
- Jimmy Hall – harmonica
- Wes Hightower – backing vocals
- Lee Ann Womack – backing vocals

== Charts ==
Chart (2010)	Peak position
U.S. Billboard Country Albums	8
U.S. Billboard 200	43
