= Magnolia (Randy Houser album) =

Studio album by Randy Houser
- Released: January 11, 2019
- Genre: Country
- Length: 47:42
- Label: Stoney Creek
- Producer: Randy Houser; Keith Gattis

Randy Houser chronology
Fired Up (2016)	Magnolia (2019)	Note to Self (2022)

Singles from Magnolia
- 1. "What Whiskey Does" Released: July 23, 2018; 2. "No Stone Unturned" Released: May 20, 2019

Magnolia is the fifth studio album by American country music singer Randy Houser. It was released on January 11, 2019 via Broken Bow Records' Stoney Creek imprint. The album includes the single "What Whiskey Does", a duet with Hillary Lindsey.

== Content ==
Magnolia was originally slated for release on November 2, 2018, but Houser chose to postpone the album's release. The lead single, "What Whiskey Does", features Hillary Lindsey.

Houser produced the album with singer-songwriter Keith Gattis. Of its content, he told Taste of Country that "When writing for this new project, I knew the production had to lean on songs and melodies, not a bunch of tricks and loops. That was the catalyst for the album. So, for the past two years we’ve been focused on trying to find a unique sound and trying to best serve the songs."

== Commercial performance ==
The album debuted at No. 11 on Billboard's Country Albums chart. It has sold 12,000 copies in the United States as of January 2022.

== Track listing ==
All tracks are written by Randy Houser, with additional co-writers as noted.

No.	Title	Writer(s)	Length
1.	"No Stone Unturned"	Dallas Davidson	4:21
2.	"Our Hearts" (featuring Lucie Silvas)	Kylie Sackley; Rob Hatch	3:28
3.	"What Whiskey Does" (featuring Hillary Lindsey)	Keith Gattis; Hillary Lindsey	3:46
4.	"Whole Lotta Quit"	Travis Meadows	4:26
5.	"No Good Place to Cry"	Gary Nicholson	4:31
6.	"New Buzz"	Gattis; Jeff Trott	2:59
7.	"Nothin' on You"	Jaren Johnston; Tony Lane	2:59
8.	"What Leaving Looks Like"	John Osborne; James Otto	4:00
9.	"High Time"	Brice Long	5:49
10.	"Mama Don't Know"	Johnston; Lane	3:34
11.	"Running Man"	Jeffrey Steele	4:00
12.	"Evangeline"	Otto	3:54

== Personnel ==
Adapted from liner notes.

Musicians and Vocals

- Randy Houser – vocals, backing vocals, acoustic guitar, electric guitar
- Rami Jaffee – keyboards, Hammond B3 organ
- John Henry Trinko – acoustic piano, Fender Rhodes, Wurlitzer electric piano, Hammond B3 organ, toy piano, accordion
- Keith Gattis – programming, acoustic guitar, baritone guitar, electric guitar, banjo, mandolin, bass, percussion, harmonica, backing vocals
- Dan Baird – electric guitar
- Audley Freed – acoustic guitar, electric guitar
- John Osborne – electric guitar, backing vocals
- Randy Kohrs – dobro
- Paul Franklin – pedal steel guitar
- Robby Turner – pedal steel guitar
- Lee Hendricks – bass
- Billy Mercer – bass
- Matt Chamberlain – drums, percussion
- Fred Eltringham – drums, percussion
- Kevin Murphy – drums
- Craig Wright – drums
- David Henry – strings
- Jessi Alexander – backing vocals
- Lucie Silvas – backing vocals (2)
- Hillary Lindsey – backing vocals (3)
- Gale Mayes – backing vocals
- T. J. Osborne – backing vocals

Production and Technical

- Randy Houser – producer
- Keith Gattis – producer, engineer
- Leo Roriz – engineer, additional recording, digital editing
- Kevin Szymanski – recording, mixing, digital editing
- Charlie Brocco – additional recording
- Justin Niebank – additional mixing
- Ted Jensen – mastering at Sterling Sound (New York City, New York)
- Mike "Frog" Griffith – production coordinator

Visuals

- David Bromley – illustrations
- Tatiana Houser – photography
- Glenn Sweitzer – package design
- Ray Pederson – signwriting

== Charts ==
Chart (2019)	Peak position
Australian Albums (ARIA)	53
US Billboard 200	135
US Independent Albums (Billboard)	2
US Top Country Albums (Billboard)	11
