= Song Number 7 =

Single by Randy Houser

from the album Fired Up
- Released: March 28, 2016
- Recorded: 2016
- Genre: Country; country rock
- Length: 3:00
- Label: Stoney Creek
- Songwriters: Justin Wilson; Ben Hayslip; Chris Janson
- Producer: Derek George

Randy Houser singles chronology
"We Went" (2015)	"Song Number 7" (2016)	"Chasing Down a Good Time" (2016)

"Song Number 7" is a song recorded by American country music artist Randy Houser. It was released on March 28, 2016. It is the second single to Houser's fourth studio album, Fired Up, which was released March 11, 2016. The song was written by Justin Wilson, Ben Hayslip and Chris Janson.

== Critical reception ==
Website Taste of Country reviewed the single with favor, praising the country rock instrumentation as well as Houser's vocal performance.

== Chart performance ==
Chart (2016)	Peak position
US Country Airplay (Billboard)	43
US Hot Country Songs (Billboard)	46
