= Whistlin' Dixie =

Single by Randy Houser

from the album They Call Me Cadillac
- Released: November 2, 2009
- Recorded: 2009
- Genre: Country rock
- Length: 3:09
- Label: Universal South
- Songwriters: Randy Houser; Kim Tribble
- Producers: Mark Wright; Cliff Audretch III

Randy Houser singles chronology
"Boots On" (2009)	"Whistlin' Dixie" (2009)	"I'm All About It" (2010)

"Whistlin' Dixie" is a song co-written and recorded by American country music artist Randy Houser. It was released in November 2009 as the lead-off single from his 2010 album They Call Me Cadillac. Houser wrote the song with Kim Tribble.

== Content ==
The song is an up-tempo in which the narrator lists off various traits pertaining to a rural lifestyle.

== Critical reception ==
Matt Bjorke of Roughstock gave the song a positive review, describing it as a "likable southern rock track" and comparing Houser's vocals to Ronnie Dunn's. He noted that while the "lyrics are somewhat similar to other 'proud and loud' country songs," he praised the song's melody. Chris Neal of Country Weekly magazine said that the lyrics had "one unconnected declarative statement after another," but described Houser's "full-gale voice" and the "Southern-rock stomp" production favorably.

== Music video ==
The music video, which was directed by Chris Hicky, premiered on CMT on November 6, 2009.

== Chart performance ==
The song debuted at number 59 on the U.S. Billboard Hot Country Songs chart for the week of October 31, 2009. It peaked at number 31 in February 2010 just missing the Top 30.

Chart (2009–2010)	Peak position
US Hot Country Songs (Billboard)	31
