= How Country Feels (song) =

Single by Randy Houser

from the album How Country Feels
- Released: May 7, 2012
- Recorded: April 16, 2012
- Genre: Country, country rock
- Length: 3:05
- Label: Stoney Creek
- Songwriters: Vicky McGehee; Wendell Mobley; Neil Thrasher
- Producer: Derek George

Randy Houser singles chronology
"In God's Time" (2011)	"How Country Feels" (2012)	"Runnin' Outta Moonlight" (2013)

"How Country Feels" is a song written by Vicky McGehee, Wendell Mobley, and Neil Thrasher and recorded by American country music artist Randy Houser. It was released in May 2012 as the first single and title track from Houser's album of the same name. The song would become semi-famous for being the first song on a majority of stations nationwide joining Cumulus Media's "Nash FM" format, starting with WNSH in New York in January 2013; as a fitting bookend, when the format signed off the station in October 2021, station DJ Kelly Ford, the first under the format, would use it to sign off the station's live farewell show.

== Critical reception ==
Billy Dukes of Taste of Country gave the song three and a half stars out of five, writing that "the lyrics are sharp but familiar, and there isn’t a whole lot of attitude until a guitar solo late in the song." Matt Bjorke of Roughstock gave the song a favorable review, calling it "a strong, melodic single that is immediate and hook-filled and sung perfectly."

== Commercial performance ==
"How Country Feels" debuted at number 55 on the U.S. Billboard Hot Country Songs chart for the week of May 12, 2012. It debuted at number 81 on the U.S. Billboard Hot 100 chart for the week of November 21, 2012. It debuted at number 55 on the Canadian Hot 100 chart for the week of December 15, 2012. On the Country Airplay chart dated February 2, 2013, "How Country Feels" became Houser's first Number One country hit. The song has sold over a million copies in the US as of March 2015.

== Music video ==
The music video was filmed at Glen Leven Farm in Nashville, Tennessee. It was directed by Wes Edwards and premiered on August 31, 2012.

The video stars a female office worker in her cubicle as she chats with her friend online. Her friend asks if she is able to hang out with her and their other friends in the country, but she can't because she is working during the weekend. Her friend sends her a link to the song "How Country Feels". When she clicks on it, she takes off her glasses and enters a daydream of herself in the countryside.

She wanders around in the field and accepts a ride with a young man with a pick up truck. He takes her to a country cottage with many of his friends. Near the end, Houser performs the song with his band at the cottage. As she leans to kiss the man who picked her up, the girl wakes up in her cubicle, realizing it was a dream. But seeing she is still wearing her boots suggests otherwise.

== Charts and certifications ==
=== Album ===
Chart (2012–2013)	Peak position
Canada Hot 100 (Billboard)	46
Canada Country (Billboard)	1
US Billboard Hot 100	42
US Hot Country Songs (Billboard)	6
US Country Airplay (Billboard)	1

=== Year-end charts ===
Chart (2012)	Position
US Hot Country Songs (Billboard)	70
Chart (2013)	Position
US Country Airplay (Billboard)	51
US Hot Country Songs (Billboard)	46

=== Certifications ===
Region	Certification	Certified units/sales
Canada (Music Canada)	Gold	40,000^{*}
New Zealand (RMNZ)	Gold	15,000^{‡}
United States (RIAA)	Platinum	1,008,000
^{*} Sales figures based on certification alone.^{‡} Sales+streaming figures based on certification alone.
