= Goodnight Kiss =

Single by Randy Houser

from the album How Country Feels
- Released: September 23, 2013
- Recorded: 2013
- Genre: Country
- Length: 3:26
- Label: Stoney Creek
- Songwriters: Rob Hatch; Jason Sellers; Randy Houser
- Producer: Derek George

Randy Houser singles chronology
"Runnin' Outta Moonlight" (2013)	"Goodnight Kiss" (2013)	"Like a Cowboy" (2014)

"Goodnight Kiss" is a song recorded by American country music artist Randy Houser. It was released in September 2013 as the third single from his third studio album, How Country Feels. Houser wrote the song with Rob Hatch and Jason Sellers.

== Critical reception ==
Billy Dukes of Taste of Country gave the song a favorable review, writing that "Houser’s softer side comes through on this mid-tempo love song." Bobby Peacock of Roughstock also gave the song a favorable review, saying that "But even if the lyrics aren't anything to write home about, they're still familiar and sincerely sung. Randy is usually a bit of a belter, but the verses allow him to tone it down before going full-force on the chorus, thus allowing a little more color to his sturdy voice than usual. The production is a bit loud, but not to the point of distraction.

== Music video ==
The music video was directed by Wes Edwards and premiered in October 2014.

== Chart performance ==
"Goodnight Kiss" debuted at number 59 on the U.S. Billboard Country Airplay chart for the week of September 28, 2013. It also debuted at number 50 on the U.S. Billboard Hot Country Songs chart for the week of October 26, 2013. It also debuted at number 93 on the U.S. Billboard Hot 100 chart for the week of January 25, 2014. It also debuted at number 96 on the Canadian Hot 100 chart for the week of February 15, 2014. The song has sold 352,000 copies in the U.S. as of April 2014.

Chart (2013–2014)	Peak position
Canada Hot 100 (Billboard)	50
Canada Country (Billboard)	3
US Billboard Hot 100	52
US Country Airplay (Billboard)	2
US Hot Country Songs (Billboard)	9

=== Year-end charts ===
Chart (2014)	Position
US Country Airplay (Billboard)	17
US Hot Country Songs (Billboard)	48

== Certifications ==
Region	Certification	Certified units/sales
United States (RIAA)	Gold	500,000^{‡}
^{‡} Sales+streaming figures based on certification alone.
