= Anything Goes (Randy Houser song) =

Single by Randy Houser

from the album Anything Goes
- Released: June 2, 2008
- Genre: Country
- Length: 3:04
- Label: Universal South
- Songwriters: Brice Long; John Wayne Wiggins
- Producers: Cliff Audretch III; Mark Wright

Randy Houser singles chronology
"Anything Goes" (2008)	"Boots On" (2009)

Music video
- "Anything Goes" at CMT.com

"Anything Goes" is the debut single by American country music artist Randy Houser, released in June 2008. It is the title track of his 2008 debut album of the same name. The song was written by Brice Long and John Wayne Wiggins.

== Content ==
"Anything Goes" is a mid-tempo ballad, mostly accompanied by piano and Hammond B-3 organ, with pedal steel guitar flourishes. In it, the narrator recalls a one-night stand with a woman whom he has met a bar. He states that he does not feel guilty about the encounter, because his lover has left him.

== Music video ==
A music video was made for the song in October 2008. Directed by Vincenzo Giammanco, the video starts with Houser walking into a bar to drink a beer. Scenes also show him playing guitar in the bar. In the second verse of the song, Houser is seen sitting on a bed, with his one-night stand still asleep. At the end of the video, Houser places his guitar into a fire. This music video was filmed at the Star Lounge in Ventura, CA.

== Critical reception ==
The song has received mixed reception from music reviewers. Brady Vercher of Engine 145, stated in his review of the album that Houser "showed a lot of promise" in this song. He also described it as "similar in theme to Jamey Johnson's 'Mary Go Round', only from a slightly different perspective." Stephen Thomas Erlewine of AllMusic described "Anything Goes" as "melodic and tightly constructed, but not quite memorable." Allen Jacobs of Roughstock gave the song a mixed review, thinking that the verses "stumbled", but described Houser's vocal performance favorably.

== Chart performance ==
"Anything Goes" was released in May 2008. It debuted at No. 56 on the Billboard Hot Country Songs chart dated June 21, 2008. It reached its peak of No. 16 on the country chart dated December 6, 2008.

Chart (2008–2009)	Peak position
US Billboard Hot 100	92
US Hot Country Songs (Billboard)	16
