= Like a Cowboy =

Single by Randy Houser

from the album How Country Feels
- Released: May 19, 2014
- Recorded: 2013
- Genre: Country
- Length: 4:21
- Label: Stoney Creek
- Songwriter(s): Randy Houser; Brice Long
- Producer(s): Derek George

Randy Houser singles chronology
"Goodnight Kiss" (2013)	"Like a Cowboy" (2014)	"We Went" (2015)

"Like a Cowboy" is a song recorded by American country music artist Randy Houser. It was released in May 2014 as the fourth single from his third studio album, How Country Feels. Houser wrote the song with Brice Long.

== Critical reception ==
The song received a favorable review from Taste of Country, which called it "a pure, unencumbered vocal showcase" and "for country fans who just like to hear a great vocalist at his best." The song was nominated for CMA Song of the Year and earned its RIAA Gold certification for more than 500,000 sales and on-demand stream units.

== Music video ==
The music video was directed by Dustin Rikert and premiered in June 2014. It was filmed at Old Tucson Studios in Tucson, Arizona.

== Commercial performance ==
"Like a Cowboy" debuted at number 57 on the U.S. Billboard Country Airplay chart for the week of June 7, 2014. It also debuted at number 50 on the U.S. Billboard Hot Country Songs chart for the week of June 28, 2014. The song has sold 452,000 copies in the US as of March 2019.

== Charts ==
Chart (2014–2015)	Peak position
Canada (Canadian Hot 100)	87
Canada Country (Billboard)	6
US Billboard Hot 100	62
US Country Airplay (Billboard)	3
US Hot Country Songs (Billboard)	9

=== Year-end charts ===
Chart (2014)	Position
US Country Airplay (Billboard)	83
US Hot Country Songs (Billboard)	87

Chart (2015)	Position
US Country Airplay (Billboard)	42
US Hot Country Songs (Billboard)	61

== Certifications ==
Region	Certification	Certified units/sales
United States (RIAA)	Gold	500,000^{‡}
^{‡} Sales+streaming figures based on certification alone.
