= We Went =

- Digital single cover

Single by Randy Houser

from the album Fired Up
- Released: May 18, 2015
- Recorded: 2015
- Genre: Country
- Length: 2:59
- Label: Stoney Creek
- Songwriters: Justin Wilson; Matthew J Rogers; John King
- Producer: Derek George

Randy Houser singles chronology
"Like a Cowboy" (2014)	"We Went" (2015)	"Song Number 7" (2016)

"We Went" is a song recorded by American country music artist Randy Houser. It was initially released online via Rolling Stone Country on April 27, 2015, with a wide release on May 18. It is the lead single to Houser's fourth studio album, Fired Up, which was released March 11, 2016. The song was written by Justin Wilson, Matt Rogers and John King.

== Music video ==
The music video for "We Went" was directed by Dustin Rikert and premiered in August 2015.

== Critical reception ==
Billy Dukes of Taste of Country gave the song a positive review, saying that "The How Country Feels album was a commercial comeback album for Houser, but this song feels more personal. Maybe he's just more confident after several No. 1 hits. "We Went" is not a true vocal showcase a la "Like a Cowboy," but there's enough power between his voice and this arrangement to remind fans he's not resting on a good year or two."

== Chart performance ==
The single has sold 300,000 copies in the US as of March 2016.

=== Weekly charts ===
Chart (2015–2016)	Peak position
Canada Hot 100 (Billboard)	93
Canada Country (Billboard)	3
US Billboard Hot 100	60
US Country Airplay (Billboard)	1
US Hot Country Songs (Billboard)	7

=== Year-end charts ===
Chart (2015)	Position
US Country Airplay (Billboard)	85
US Hot Country Songs (Billboard)	83

Chart (2016)	Position
US Country Airplay (Billboard)	33
US Hot Country Songs (Billboard)	57
