= Runnin' Outta Moonlight =

Single by Randy Houser

from the album How Country Feels
- Released: March 4, 2013
- Recorded: 2013
- Genre: Country
- Length: 3:13
- Label: Stoney Creek
- Songwriters: Dallas Davidson; Ashley Gorley; Kelley Lovelace
- Producer: Derek George

Randy Houser singles chronology
"How Country Feels" (2012)	"Runnin' Outta Moonlight" (2013)	"Goodnight Kiss" (2013)

"Runnin' Outta Moonlight" is a song recorded by American country music artist Randy Houser. It was released in March 2013 as the second single from his third studio album, How Country Feels. It was written by Dallas Davidson, Ashley Gorley, and Kelley Lovelace.

"Runnin' Outta Moonlight" is Houser's second number-one single, following "How Country Feels" in taking the top spot on the Country Airplay chart. It also peaked at numbers three and 24 on both the Hot Country Songs and Hot 100 charts respectively. It's currently Houser's only top 40 hit on the Hot 100. The song was certified Platinum by the Recording Industry Association of America (RIAA), and has sold 1,028,000 copies in that country as of October 2013. It achieved similar success in Canada, reaching number one on the Country chart and number 44 on the Canadian Hot 100. The song garnered a Platinum certification from Music Canada, denoting sales of 80,000 units in that country.

An accompanying music video for the song, directed by Wes Edwards, features a couple falling in love under the night sky with a band led by Houser performing under the same sky. It was nominated for Male Video of the Year at the 2014 CMT Music Awards.

== Critical reception ==
Billy Dukes of Taste of Country gave the song three and a half stars out of five, writing that "[Houser's] vocal performance demands attention and offers a pleasing reward in a story of two lovers enjoying a date in the country," adding "we've heard this same story 1,000 times, but it feels freshly pulled from a clean spring when Houser opens up." Alanna Conaway of Roughstock gave the song four stars out of five, saying that "it's an of-the-moment, spend-time-with-one-you-love kind of love song, one that has a delicious up-tempo sing-a-long melody and a nicely written lyrical cadence permed expertly by Randy Houser." In 2018, Riane Konc of The Boot put "Runnin' Outta Moonlight" at number five on her top 10 list of Houser's best songs.

== Commercial performance ==
"Runnin' Outta Moonlight" debuted at number 41 on the Billboard Hot Country Songs chart for the week of February 9, 2013, and entered the Country Airplay chart four weeks later at number 56. The song reached atop the Country Airplay chart and peaked at number three on the Hot Country Songs chart in August 2013. It also debuted at number 91 on the Billboard Hot 100 chart for the week of May 25. It peaked at number 24 the week of August 17 and remained on the chart for twenty weeks. Twelve days later, it was certified platinum by the Recording Industry Association of America. As of October 2013, the song has sold 1,028,000 copies in the US.

In Canada, it debuted at number 93 on the Canadian Hot 100 chart for the week of May 25, 2013, peaking at number 44 the week of August 17, and stayed on the chart for twenty weeks. "Runnin' Outta Moonlight" was certified platinum by Music Canada on January 21, 2014.

== Music video ==
The music video was directed by Wes Edwards and premiered in May 2013. It was shot inside Nashville's Sudekum Planetarium. The video opens with Houser and his band performing under a starry night sky and follows a young couple driving a truck through the country towards an empty field where they lie down to look at the constellations and the full moon get slowly replaced by a sunrise. It was nominated for Male Video of the Year at the 2014 CMT Music Awards but went to Blake Shelton's "Doin' What She Likes".

== Charts ==
Chart (2013)	Peak position
Canada Hot 100 (Billboard)	44
Canada Country (Billboard)	1
US Billboard Hot 100	24
US Hot Country Songs (Billboard)	3
US Country Airplay (Billboard)	1

=== Year-end charts ===
Chart (2013)	Position
US Billboard Hot 100	98
US Country Airplay (Billboard)	17
US Hot Country Songs (Billboard)	10

== Certifications ==
Region	Certification	Certified units/sales
Canada (Music Canada)	Platinum	80,000^{*}
United States (RIAA)	Platinum	1,028,000
^{*} Sales figures based on certification alone.^{‡} Sales+streaming figures based on certification alone.
