= TV by the Numbers =

Web site devoted to US television ratings data

- Available in: English
- Headquarters: Calabasas, California, {{{location_country}}}
- Owner: Nexstar Media Group
- Creators: Robert Seidman; Bill Gorman
- Launched: September 2007
- Current status: Inactive

TV by the Numbers was a website devoted to collecting and analyzing television ratings data in the United States that operated from 2007 to 2020. It was a part of Nexstar Media Group's Zap2it television news/listings site.

== History ==
An Internet and statistical analyst, Robert Seidman had previously worked for IBM and Charles Schwab, and published an online newsletter about the Internet and AOL before founding TV by the Numbers; Bill Gorman had been an AOL executive until 1998, and had read Seidman's column. Friends since the early 1990s when they met near Washington, D.C., both were fond of television, as Gorman loved numbers and Seidman enjoyed statistics relating to it; the subject of television ratings data entered into one of their conversations. Gorman was dismayed at being unable to find other blogs devoted solely to television data, and after a Google search confirmed this, he and Seidman thought of the idea for a website devoted solely to the subject. In Gorman's words, while there were sites devoted to disseminating certain subjects, "there was no site that did the same thing for the television industry. That is, compile the numbers in a way, and analyze them in a way, that consumers would understand". Gorman elaborated in a 2010 interview:

We try to focus on publicly available facts. We're not breaking any news. We're not interviewing people to try to get the last bit of juicy gossip. We focus on publicly available, either ratings or financial information, and what that likely means for your favorite show. Whether they're coming back or going away.

On June 30, 2009, in response to pressure from Nielsen Media Research, TV by the Numbers made large changes to their archives. The main ratings archives no longer go past 2 weeks prior to the date a reader accesses them.

On November 10, 2010, TV by the Numbers announced that they were partnering with TV news website Zap2it. As a result, the website's URL changed to a subdomain of the zap2it.com domain. In addition, Zap2it features such as TV listings began to appear on the site.

In response to The New York Times' decision in 2011 to start charging for access to online content, Gorman wrote an article stressing his website will remain free.

In January 2012, Gorman and Seidman expressed interest in hiring writers to do the day-to-day writing on their site. On February 12, 2012, they announced that Sara Bibel and Amanda Kondolojy would be joining the website.

On April 3, 2014, Zap2It owner Tribune Digital Ventures purchased the site in full.

On January 31, 2020, the website's staff released a statement declaring TV by the Numbers to be inactive starting the very next day, February 1, 2020. The staff bid goodbye and thanked readers. This is in part due to TV ratings being less of a factor due to the rise in media streaming. As of August 2020, its URL redirects to Zap2It's TV listings service.

== Impact ==
According to one source, much of the information Gorman and Seidman had access to was not readily available to the media, and thus their efforts to analyze the data led to many "savvy readers" becoming interested in the workings of the ratings process.

TV by the Numbers was cited by such media outlets as CNN, the Associated Press, National Public Radio, and former sister publication the Chicago Tribune.

=== Harry's Law ===
TV by the Numbers received criticism from several facets of the television industry for their ratings analyses. Harry's Law star Kathy Bates publicly bashed the website's ideas about ratings and their symbol "The Cancellation Bear", in an interview for Entertainment Weekly. She stated, "Some of these people are just so stupid. I don't even get it.... All [they] talk about is the blessed [18–49] demo this, demo that, and how the Cancellation Bear is gonna eat us and all that stuff. So we'll see. We'll just see." Harry's Law executive producer Bill D'Elia agreed with Bates, stating in subsequent Twitter messages, "WTF is TV by the numbers? Who cares what they think? #harryslaw is most viewed scripted drama on NBC and will return....First, tv by the numbers doesn't know anything. They are misinformed at best, ignorant at worst. Second, Kathy is right."

After Harry's Law was cancelled in May 2012 and the site issued a passive-aggressive response to the news, D'Elia again turned to Twitter to express his feelings on the website, stating, "TVBTN Negativism fuels belief to not watch shows. He influences viewers to not watch something, self-fulfilling his prophecy. Just awful"

=== Suburgatory ===
The Cancellation Bear was mentioned in the Suburgatory season 2 episode "Body Talk". Suburgatory showrunner Emily Kapnek subsequently did an interview with TV by the Numbers, explaining: "we just thought it would be really funny to have [the show's] school TV station governed by the same panic and hysteria that everyone feels watching their shows live and die and get discussed online so we thought it was just a really fun shout out because we're all on your site all the time."

=== Galavant ===
In May 2015, TV By the Numbers predicted that the musical-comedy series Galavant would be canceled after its first season. After a surprise renewal, the second season began with an episode titled "A New Season a.k.a. Suck It Cancellation Bear" in mockery of the website.

== Features ==
TV by the Numbers had many features. Most focused on television ratings and the analysis of those ratings.

=== News categories ===
The site was well known for its coverage of Nielsen ratings. The following is a list of all of the types of ratings covered by the site:

Broadcast Overnight
Daily preliminary rating reports for television series airing in prime time on the five major broadcast television networks – ABC, CBS, The CW, Fox, and NBC; ratings in this category were published the day after a program aired.
Broadcast Final
Identical to overnight reports, with the exception of additional processing and revising and were updated on weekdays; ratings for Monday through Thursday's broadcasts were released the following Friday, with ratings for Friday released on Monday and Sunday's ratings on Tuesdays. Final ratings from Saturday were omitted from this category.
Cable Final
Rating reports for cable networks, updated on weekdays; the site received a list of the top 100 cable shows for the night in the 25–54 age demographic from Nielsen. The site processed the information to list programs by viewers within the 18–49 demographic.
Cable News
Ratings lists for programs broadcast on major cable news networks; updated on weekdays
Broadcast DVR
Lists of programs that increased their viewership the most after seven days of DVR usage were indicated; reports in this category were published the second Monday after a show aired.
Weekly Broadcast Network
The average ratings for each of the major broadcast networks from the previous week (Monday through Sunday), published on Tuesdays
Weekly Cable Network
The average ratings for the top cable networks from the previous week; published on Tuesdays
Top-25 Broadcast Shows
The top-25 television programs on broadcast television, in terms of both total viewers and the 18–49 age demographic; published on Tuesdays
Top-25 Cable Shows
The top-25 programs on cable television with identical terms as the above; published on Tuesdays
Top-25 Syndicated Shows
The top-25 syndicated programs for both cable and broadcast networks; reports in this category had a one-week lag and were published on Tuesdays
Season-to-Date Broadcast Network
Comparisons of season-to-date ratings for the top-five broadcast networks; published on Tuesdays
Late Night
Ratings for programs broadcast after 11:30 p.m.; published on Thursdays
Evening News
Ratings for news programs broadcast in the evening; published on Thursdays
Morning News
Ratings for daytime news programs; published on Thursdays
Soap Opera
Ratings for soap operas broadcast in the daytime; published on Fridays

=== News ===
TV by the Numbers published news stories about schedule changes and ratings in television. These mostly consisted of press releases.

=== Renew/Cancel Index ===
The Renew/Cancel Index was a mathematical formula developed and used by Gorman to predict whether scripted series on the Big 5 broadcast networks would be renewed or cancelled that season.

During the 2007–2008 broadcast season, Gorman experimented with different ways to predict the fates of television series. They were all unsuccessful, until close to the end of the season when he developed the Renew/Cancel Index.

The Renew/Cancel Index differed from Gorman's previous attempts in that it compared a series' average ratings to the average ratings for their own network, as opposed to a basic numerical hierarchy or comparing ratings to an overall average from all the networks. Gorman formulated the numbers by dividing a series's season-to-date ratings average by the season-to-date average of all the scripted series on that network (in the latter half of the season, Gorman used only numbers since that January for season-to-date numbers, as that seemed to help renewal predictions). The resulting number (rounded to the nearest hundredth) showed how a series's average related to the network's average (which always came out to 1.00).

Using these numbers, Gorman then created a grading scale. There were five levels on the scale: Certain to be Renewed, Likely to be Renewed, Toss-Up, Likely to be Cancelled, and Certain to be Cancelled. Series above 1.00 were almost always certain to be renewed, while series directly below that were likely to be renewed. The distinction between likely to be renewed and toss-up was at 0.90. Although this number was 0.92 in the original incarnation, it later changed. The toss-up range continued down to 0.75, when the likely to be cancelled level started. There was no clear-cut line between the likely to be cancelled and certain to be cancelled levels, but Gorman said that discerning between likely/certain cancellations was usually just trivial, and thus unimportant. Friday series, being on a lesser-viewed night, were graded differently. The toss-up range was between 0.55 and 0.70, with the numbers above it being likely/certain renewals and the numbers below it being likely/certain cancellations.

Gorman did not always follow the index numbers religiously. For example, series that were within a season of reaching the 88-episode mark (the usual requirement for stripped syndication) usually received a large boost. In Fall 2011, Gorman stated that no series that fell into this category would be ranked less than a toss-up. In Fall 2013, he even made the point of putting most series in this category as Certain to be Renewed, despite the fact that many of them had not aired yet. On the other hand, he did not take internal issues (contract disputes, scheduling arguments, etc.) into account.

The Renew/Cancel index was updated with a new article every Tuesday, from the beginning of the broadcast season in late September to the dates of the network upfront presentations in mid-May.

=== Bubble Watch ===
Seidman created the Bubble Watch which, similarly to the Renew/Cancel Index, aimed to predict based upon ratings data which television series would be canceled and which would be renewed. It used a scale for sorting series that was similar to the Renew/Cancel Index, with On the Bubble being identical to Gorman's Toss-Up category. Series above the bubble were in the Renewal Predicted category, while series below the bubble were in the Cancellation Predicted category.

Unlike the Renew/Cancel Index, the Bubble Watch did not use a mathematical formula. Additionally, it took the possibilities of future ratings into account, something that Gorman strictly did not do with his index. In the end, though, the predictions of the Bubble Watch and the Renew/Cancel Index were usually very similar.

In October 2012, Seidman decided to stop publishing the Bubble Watch and replaced it with a simple list of the renewed and the cancelled series. He did not disclose his reasons, but said that it might or might not be temporary. Many readers were disappointed and expressed their disappointment to Seidman. Seidman recognized that and reinstated the Bubble Watch on November 4, 2012. He stated that readership levels were basically the same for the Bubble Watch and its temporary replacement, but he wanted to "give the vocal minority who really cares about the table format the table format they asked for."

The Bubble Watch was updated with a new article every Sunday, during the same period as the Renew/Cancel Index. Seidman wrote every update from the Bubble Watch's inception until May 2013. He then took a break for an unspecified period of time, and longtime reader and occasional contributor Tom Shaw took his place in September 2013.

The Bubble Watch did not return for the 2014–15 season, however Tom Shaw contributed to Renew/Cancel Index posts and there was a one-week edition of the Bubble Watch in December.

=== Other features ===
==== Scripted Cable Series Renew/Cancel Status ====
Readers of the Renew/Cancel Index and the Bubble Watch inquired many times to Seidman and Gorman about why they did not predict the renewal chances of cable series. In response, Gorman and Seidman explained that the cable networks were not limited to the strict structure of the broadcast networks. This results in them being much more erratic in renewals and cancellations, and thus too hard to predict accurately. Seidman decided to make a compromise of sorts and made a simple list of the renewed and the cancelled cable series. Called the Scripted Cable Renew/Cancel Status, its first post was published on November 7, 2012.

The Scripted Cable Renew/Cancel Status explicitly did not predict the fates of television series. It only stated their status. If a series had been cancelled or had been renewed for an upcoming season, it would have been stated in the list. If a series's future beyond the season that was currently airing (or, if the series was on hiatus, the season that had just been previously airing) had not been officially declared by the network, there would have been a blank spot in that series's row on the list. The Scripted Cable Renew/Cancel Status did not include unscripted series, children's and teens' series, late night series on the Adult Swim network, and series airing on minor broadcast networks (such as PBS). These exclusions were necessary to keep the list short.

The Scripted Cable Renew/Cancel Status was published every Saturday, a total of 12 times. On March 30, 2013, Seidman announced he would stop publishing the posts, citing low readership as the reason for the discontinuation.

== See also ==
- Nielsen ratings
