= Boots On =

Single by Randy Houser

from the album Anything Goes
- Released: February 23, 2009
- Recorded: 2008
- Genre: Country
- Length: 2:51
- Label: Universal South
- Songwriters: Randy Houser; Brandon Kinney
- Producers: Cliff Audretch III; Mark Wright

Randy Houser singles chronology
"Anything Goes" (2008)	"Boots On" (2009)	"Whistlin' Dixie" (2009)

"Boots On" is a song co-written and recorded by American country music artist Randy Houser. It was released in February 2009 as the second single from his debut album Anything Goes. The song peaked at number 2 on the U.S. Billboard Hot Country Songs chart. Houser wrote this song with Brandon Kinney.

== Content ==
The song is an up-tempo with a theme of rural pride. The male narrator states that he is going to a bar to have fun with his "boots on", and states later on that he will die with his boots on.

== Critical reception ==
Matt Bjorke of Roughstock gave the song a favorable review. He described the song as "the kind of song that radio loves precisely because fans will also love it." Kevin J. Coyne of Country Universe gave "Boots On" a B− rating. He stated that "Houser’s enthusiastic performance helps to elevate the rather ordinary material, but there’s been such a glut of 'country and proud of it' songs lately."

== Music video ==
A music video was made, and was directed by Drake Vaughan and Eric Welch. The video features a toddler, Drake Dixon, son of songwriter Dillon Dixon, singing along with the song, and miming guitar playing. The footage of Drake singing along was originally shot by his nanny, Vickie Vaughan, who subsequently put the video on MySpace. The video became popular online, and Houser decided to incorporate it in his video, making it look like Drake was in his car. At the beginning of the video, Houser puts a digital video camera on his dashboard, pointed at Drake. At the end of the video, after finishing filling up his car, Houser finds he's locked out of it, but Drake's still too busy rocking out to notice.

The video was nominated for Music Video of the Year at the 2009 Country Music Association Awards, however, it lost to Taylor Swift's "Love Story".

== Chart performance ==
"Boots On" debuted at No. 59 on the Hot Country Songs chart dated March 7, 2009, and entered the Top 40 in its third chart week. It entered the Top 10 at No. 9 in July 2009 and peaked at No. 2 in September 2009, thus becoming his first Top 10 hit. It also finished at No. 3 on the Billboard Year-End chart for country music.

Weekly chart performance
Chart (2009)	Peak position
US Billboard Hot 100	53
US Hot Country Songs (Billboard)	2

=== Year-end charts ===
Annual chart rankings
Chart (2009)	Position
US Country Songs (Billboard)	3
US Radio Songs (Billboard)	80
