= Randy Houser =

American country music singer and songwriter

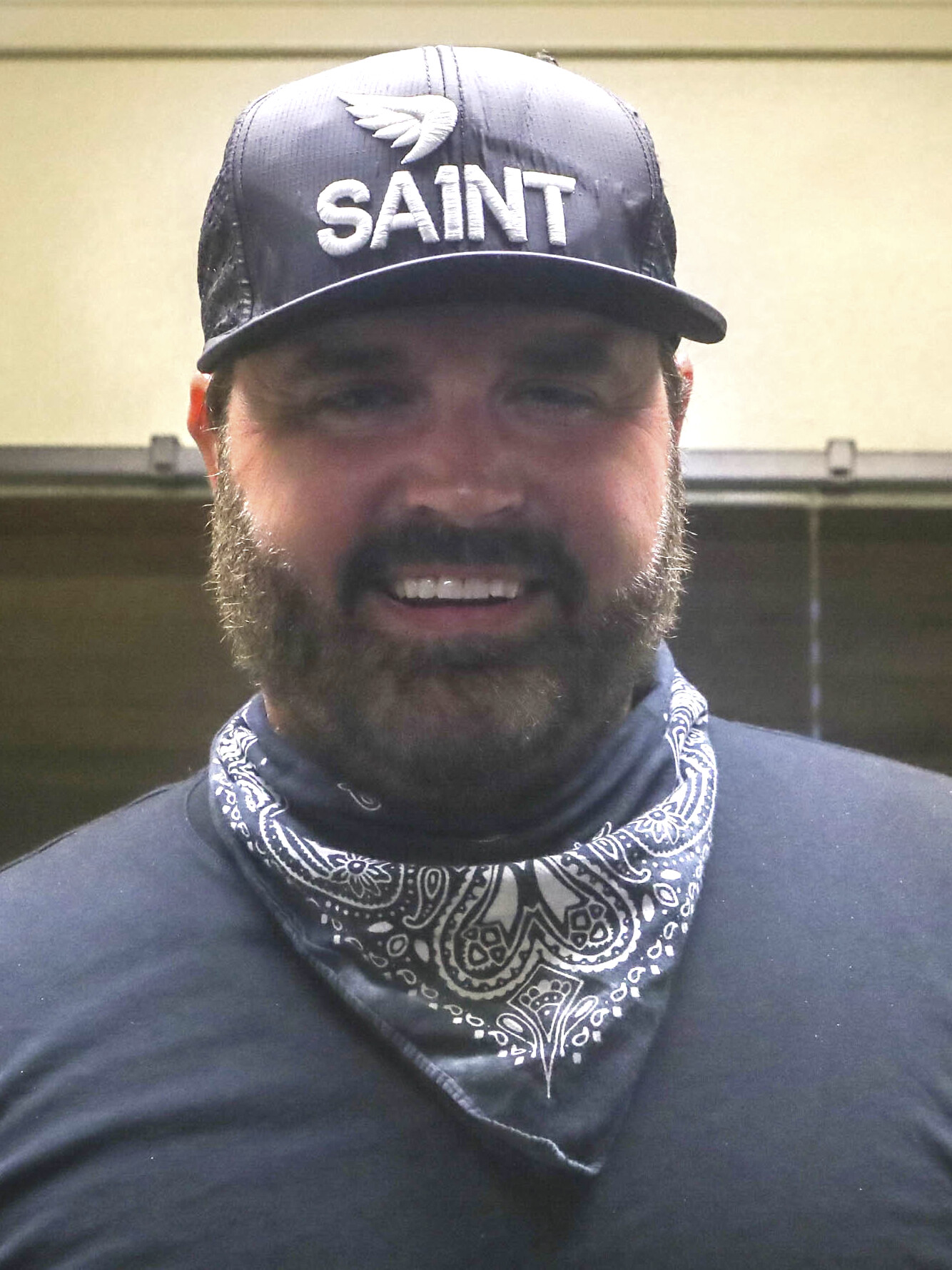
- Houser in 2018

Background information
- Born: Shawn Randolph Houser; December 18, 1975 (age 50)
- Origin: Lake, Mississippi, U.S. Nashville, Tennessee, U.S.
- Genres: Country
- Occupation: Singer-songwriter
- Instruments: Vocals; guitar
- Years active: 2004–present
- Labels: MCA Nashville; Show Dog-Universal; Stoney Creek; Magnolia

Shawn Randolph Houser (born December 18, 1975) is an American country music singer and songwriter. Houser has racked up over half a dozen hits and over 1 billion streams. His album How Country Feels topped the country radio charts with the title track, “Runnin’ Outta Moonlight” and “Goodnight Kiss” (also his first No. 1 as a songwriter) and earned critical acclaim for his powerful delivery of the Top 5 smash and nominated CMA Song of the Year, “Like A Cowboy.”

In late 2023, he landed on-screen roles in Martin Scorsese’s acclaimed film “Killers of the Flower Moon” starring Leonardo DiCaprio and Robert De Niro, as well as Dennis Quaid’s “The Hill”.

Signed to Universal South Records in 2008, he charted the single "Anything Goes". It was a top 20 hit on the Billboard country singles chart and the title track to his debut album of the same name, which also produced his first top 5 hit, "Boots On". In 2012, he moved to Broken Bow Records imprint Stoney Creek. He reached number one with "How Country Feels", the title track to his third album, and with "Runnin' Outta Moonlight" in 2013. The follow-up singles from the same album were "Goodnight Kiss", which reached number one on the Mediabase Country Chart and number two on the Country Airplay chart, and "Like a Cowboy", which reached number 3 on the Country Airplay chart in March 2015 and received a 2015 Country Music Association Awards Song of the Year nomination.

Prior to his success as an artist, Houser lived as a songwriter, co-writing singles including "Honky Tonk Badonkadonk" by Trace Adkins, "Back That Thing Up" by Justin Moore, and "My Cowboy" by country pop artist Jessie James.

== Early life ==
Houser was born in Lake, Mississippi. His father, a professional musician as well, performed at various local venues. Houser taught himself the guitar, and fronted his own band by age 10, and while attending East Central Community College in Decatur, Mississippi, he formed a band called 10 lb. Biscuit.

== Career ==
By 2002, Houser had moved to Nashville, Tennessee, to begin a songwriting career. One of his first hits as a songwriter was "Honky Tonk Badonkadonk", which he co-wrote with Jamey Johnson and Dallas Davidson. It was recorded by Trace Adkins for his 2005 album Songs About Me, and was a top 5 single. After that success, Houser shifted his focus to performing, and started playing at local gigs in Nashville. He was briefly signed to MCA Nashville but did not release anything.

=== Anything Goes (2008–2009) ===
Houser signed to Universal South Records in 2008. His first single, "Anything Goes", was released in May of that year. It was co-written by Brice Long and John Wiggins. Houser performed the song on Late Show with David Letterman in August after Letterman heard it on a satellite radio station. The song entered the top 40 of the Billboard country chart that same month. His debut album, also titled Anything Goes, was released in November, at which point the title track was in the top 20. "Boots On" was released as the album's second single in February 2009 and became his first top ten hit in July. Houser also co-wrote "Back That Thing Up", the debut single for Valory Music Group artist Justin Moore. It peaked at No. 38 on Hot Country Songs in December 2008.

Houser received two nominations for the 2009 CMA Awards, including New Artist of the Year and Music Video of the Year for "Boots On".

=== They Call Me Cadillac (2009–2010) ===
Houser, along with Jamey Johnson and Jessie James co-wrote "My Cowboy", James's third single from her self-titled debut album. It was released in late October 2009, and was also released as a music video.

Also in October 2009, Houser released his third single. The song titled "Whistlin' Dixie" was the lead-off single to his second studio album, They Call Me Cadillac. It debuted at No. 59 on the Billboard Country Songs chart before the initial release date of November 2, 2009. It peaked at No. 31 in January 2010. Afterward came "I'm All About It", which peaked at No. 49 and was not included on the album. His fifth single, "A Man Like Me", he co-wrote with Danny Green and Jameson Clark.

=== How Country Feels (2011–2015) ===
In 2011, he released the song "In God's Time", which peaked at 54 on the Billboard Hot Country Songs chart and never appeared on an album. He left Show Dog-Universal in 2011 and signed with Broken Bow Records' Stoney Creek division.

On May 7, 2012, Houser released "How Country Feels", his first single on Stoney Creek. On February 2, 2013, the song became Houser's first number one on the Country Airplay chart. His first Stoney Creek album, also titled How Country Feels, was released on January 22, 2013. The album's second single, "Runnin' Outta Moonlight", was released to radio on March 4. It reached number one on the Country Airplay chart in August 2013. The album's third single, "Goodnight Kiss", was released to country radio on September 23, 2013, which also reached number one on the Mediabase Country Chart and number two on the Country Airplay chart. "Like a Cowboy" was the final single released from the How Country Feels album which reached number 3 on the Country Airplay chart in March 2015 and received a 2015 Country Music Association Song of the Year nomination.

The album also features a duet with Kristy Lee Cook titled "Wherever Love Goes". For its single release, the song was re-recorded to make Cook the lead artist and Houser the featured artist, which was released in late 2013 as Cook's second single for Broken Bow.

Houser spent the majority of 2015 touring as direct support to Luke Bryan's Kick the Dust Up Tour.

=== Fired Up (2015–2016) ===
In April 2015, Houser released a new single titled "We Went", which served as the lead single to his fourth studio album. It reached number one on the Country Airplay chart in March 2016. The album, Fired Up, was released on March 11, 2016. Houser began his supporting tour, dubbed the "We Went Tour" in November, with shows continuing through to the end of the year. The album's second single, "Song Number 7", was released to country radio on March 28, 2016. It peaked at No. 43 on the Country Airplay chart. The album's third single, "Chasing Down a Good Time" was released to country radio on July 18, 2016. "Chasing Down a Good Time" marked Houser's worst selling single to date, failing to appear on the charts.

=== Magnolia (2019) ===
In 2018, Houser released the lead single "What Whiskey Does" from his fifth studio album, Magnolia. It features songwriter Hillary Lindsey. The album was slated to be released on November 2, 2018, but it was pushed back until January 11, 2019. "No Stone Unturned" was later released as the second single from Magnolia.

=== 2020s ===
Houser co-wrote the title track to Willie Nelson's 2020 album, First Rose of Spring.

Houser’s sixth studio album Note To Self was released in November of 2022 and features 10 tracks all co-written by Houser. In their response to the project, Music Row boasted the Mississippi-native “remains one of country music’s very finest vocalists.”

Houser made his acting debut in the 2023 faith-based drama The Hill alongside Dennis Quaid. Houser also appeared in Martin Scorsese’s Killers of the Flower Moon (film) in 2023.

== Personal life ==
Houser married Jessica Lee Yantz in 2011. She gave birth to a son in 2012. The couple divorced in 2014.

Houser married Australian-born Tatiana Starzynski, on May 4, 2016, after a year long engagement. Starzynski is the sister-in-law of singer-songwriter Dallas Davidson, who introduced the pair. The couple's first child together, a son, was born on June 9, 2019. The couple's second son was born in September 2022.

== Discography ==
- Anything Goes (2008)
- They Call Me Cadillac (2010)
- How Country Feels (2013)
- Fired Up (2016)
- Magnolia (2019)
- Note to Self (2022)

== Awards and nominations ==
Year	Organization	Award	Result
2009	Country Music Association	New Artist of the Year	Nominated
2009	Country Music Association	Music Video of the Year – "Boots On"	Nominated
2010	Academy of Country Music	Video of the Year – "Boots On"	Nominated
2010	CMT Music Awards	USA Weekend Breakthrough Video of the Year – "Boots On"	Nominated
2011	Academy of Country Music	Top New Solo Vocalist	Nominated
2013	CMT Music Awards	Breakthrough Video of the Year – "How Country Feels"	Nominated
2014	CMT Music Awards	Male Video of the Year – "Runnin' Outta Moonlight"	Nominated
2015	Country Music Association	Song of the Year – "Like a Cowboy"	Nominated
2019	Stony Creek	Breakout Song of the Year - "What Whiskey Does"	Won
