= Brice Long =

American country music singer-songwriter (born 1971)

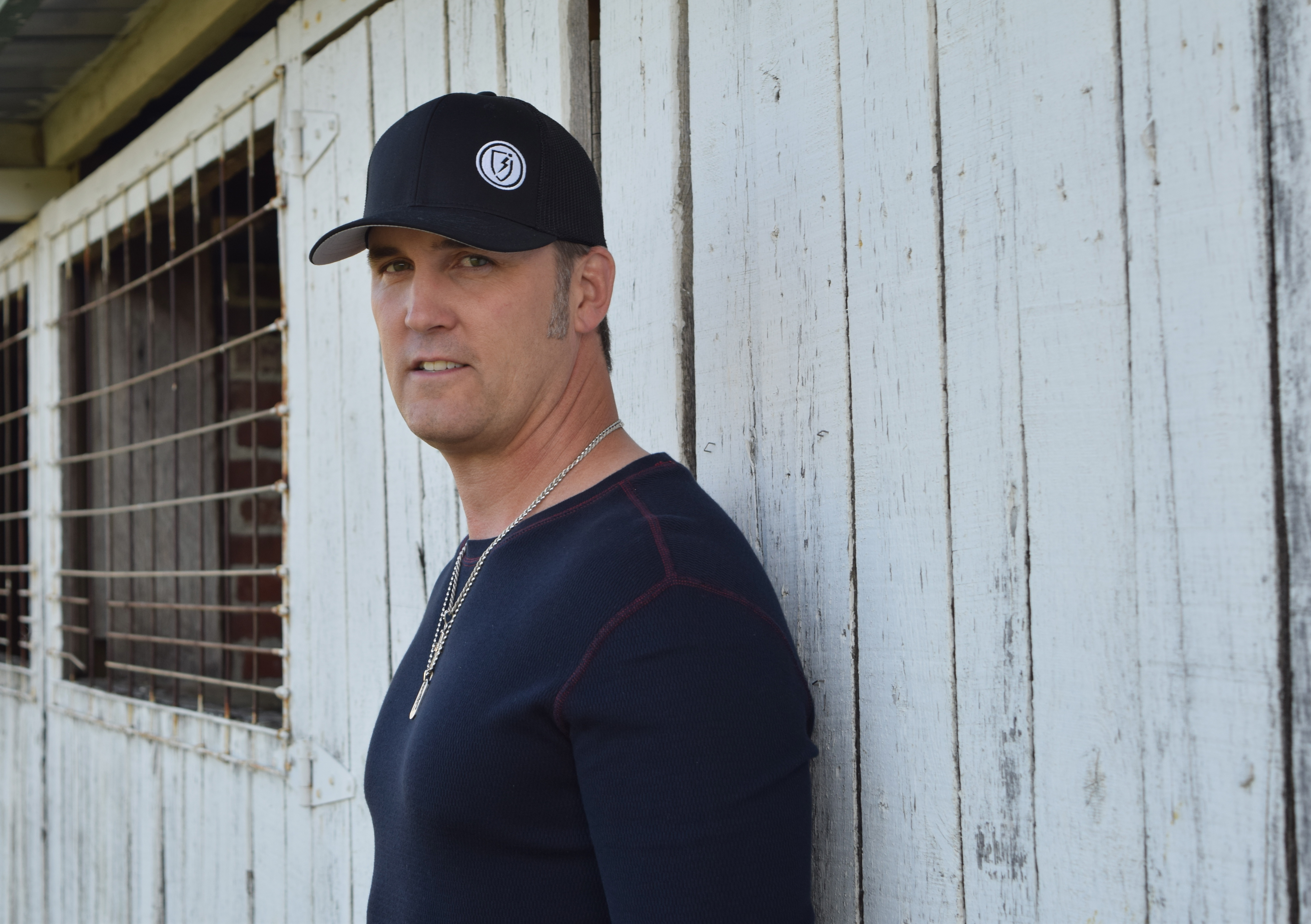

Background information
- Birth name: Brice Long
- Born: Hopkinsville, Kentucky, United States
- Genres: Country
- Occupation: Singer-songwriter
- Instrument: Vocals
- Years active: 1996–present
- Labels: Columbia

Brice Long is an American country music singer-songwriter. Signed to Columbia Records in 2005, Long charted one single on the Billboard country chart that year: "Anywhere but Here", which was also released by Chris Cagle a year later. In addition, Long co-wrote Gary Allan's 2004 Number One single "Nothing On but the Radio", Jon Pardi's Number One single "Heartache on the Dance Floor" and Randy Houser's singles "Anything Goes" and "Like a Cowboy".

== Biography ==
Brice Long was born and raised in Hopkinsville, Kentucky. In the 1990s, he pursued a career in the rodeo, until his father persuaded him to pursue musical goals instead. For the next several years, Long toured as an opening act for other artists, including Eddie Rabbitt. Rabbitt's manager persuaded Long to move to Nashville, Tennessee; he did so in 1993, after graduating from Middle Tennessee State University.

Three years later, he was signed to a songwriting contract at the publishing division of Reba McEntire's Starstruck Entertainment Company. While in internship, Long was roommates with Darryl Worley, who later achieved success as a singer-songwriter himself. Long has had his songs recorded by George Strait, Garth Brooks, Chris Young, Randy Houser, Jon Pardi, Cody Johnson, Hank Williams Jr, Reba McEntire, Casey James and Chris Stapleton. Additionally, Long sang harmony vocals on Gary Allan's 1999 album "Smoke Rings in the Dark".

In 2005, Long was signed to Columbia Records. His debut single, "It's Only Monday", was released but did not chart. "Anywhere but Here", his second single, peaked at No. 51 on Hot Country Songs. Long also issued a third single, entitled "Meat and Potato Man".

Long performed at the Kentucky Music Hall of Fame induction ceremony in 2006. He also co-wrote Casey James' "Let's Don't Call It a Night", Allan's 2009 single "Today", Jon Pardi's "What I Can't Put Down", and Brett Kissel's "Cowboys & Dreamers".

== Singles ==
| Year | Single | Peak positions |
| Year | Single | US Country |
|---|---|---|
| 2005 | "It's Only Monday" | — |
| 2005 | "Anywhere but Here" | 51 |
| 2006 | "Meat and Potato Man" | — |
| 2021 | "Hensel Phelps ft. Diego" | — |
"—" denotes releases that did not chart
