= Sophia James =

American singer-songwriter

Sophia Louise Wackerman (born September 1, 1999) is an Australian–American singer and songwriter who appeared on the 18th season of American Idol in 2020.

== Life and career ==
Born in Australia to a family of musicians, James moved to the United States when she was five years old. Her father is drummer Chad Wackerman, and her late mother was Naomi Star. Wackerman changed her stage name to Sophia James in honor of her brother James, who lives with fragile X syndrome.

James studied music at the University of California, Los Angeles, during which she entered the eighteenth season of the singing competition television show American Idol, finishing in 11th place. Since, James has entered a career in music. In addition to singing, she also plays the piano and guitar. In 2021, James released her first EP called Stand Beneath The Sky, followed by her second, titled Lines on the Freeway. Her third EP, Clockwork, was released in 2024 and features a live performance of "Valerie" by Amy Winehouse.

Aside from writing and performing her own music, James has also written music for the animated television shows Phineas and Ferb and Hamster & Gretel, and appeared as the musical director in the short film Cold Cold Man.
