= An American Idol Christmas =

Christmas television special

An American Idol Christmas (also titled A Very Idol Christmas in Canada) is a Christmas television special for the television shows American Idol, American Juniors and Canadian Idol, but focused mostly on American Idol– the Canadian winner Ryan Malcolm was edited out in the American release due to the upcoming World Idol and American Juniors. Justin Guarini also did not appear because he was reported to be in New Zealand. The special was broadcast on the Fox television network in the United States and CTV in Canada. It was first broadcast on November 25, 2003 in the United States. It featured some of the top finalists of American Idol's first season (Kelly Clarkson, Tamyra Gray, Christina Christian) and second season (Ruben Studdard, Clay Aiken, Kimberley Locke). Since the episode was not a competition, none of the judges appeared because they were working on the next season's contestants. It was directed by Bruce Gowers, produced by 19 Entertainment, Fremantle Media North America, Cécile Frot-Coutaz, Simon Fuller, David Goffin, Nigel Lythgoe and Ken Warwick.

== Songs performed ==
- "Blue Christmas"
  - Ruben Studdard
- "Perfect Christmas"
  - American Juniors
- "Have Yourself a Merry Little Christmas"
  - Ruben Studdard & Tamyra Gray
- "Grown Up Christmas List"
  - Kelly Clarkson
