= Lisa de Moraes =

American columnist

Lisa de Moraes is an American television columnist. Her writings, titled "The TV Column," appeared regularly (but not on any particular schedule) in the Style section of The Washington Post from 1998 to May 2013. In June 2013, it was announced that she had moved to Los Angeles and joined Deadline Hollywood as TV columnist.

== Early life and career ==
Early in her career, de Moraes served for nearly 10 years as TV editor for The Hollywood Reporter.

== The Washington Post ==
De Moraes joined The Washington Post in 1998.

As opposed to a TV critic such as the Post's Tom Shales, de Moraes's columns deal mainly with the business of television, such as scheduling and Nielsen ratings. Her columns are written in a distinctively irreverent tone; they usually strongly imply her opinions on the subject matter. Trademarks of her Post writings include her weekly rundown of ratings "Winners and Losers", her "We Watch So You Don't Have To" recaps (for example American Idol), and her tendency to address others (and for others to address her) as "Pookie" in her weekly live chats. De Moraes was generally critical of the George W. Bush administration and conservative groups in general, particularly in regards to the Federal Communications Commission (FCC) crackdown on indecency and the January 2005 Postcards from Buster controversy regarding the inclusion of lesbian parents on the children's program.

De Moraes left her position at the Post at the end of May 2013 to spend more time with her family. On June 18, 2013, it was announced that she had been appointed a TV columnist at Deadline Hollywood.
