= Just Sam =

American singer-songwriter (born 1998)

- Born: Samantha Diaz; November 23, 1998 (age 27); New York City, US
- Genre: R&B
- Occupations: Singer-songwriter; musician
- Instrument: Vocals
- Years active: 2019–present
- Label: Hollywood

Samantha Diaz (born November 23, 1998), known by their (Note: Just Sam uses both she/her and they/them pronouns. This article uses they/them pronouns for consistency.) stage name Just Sam, is an American singer-songwriter from Harlem, New York. They rose to fame after winning the eighteenth season of the singing reality show American Idol.

== Early life ==
Just Sam was born and raised in Harlem, New York. When they were six years old, their grandmother, Elizabeth, adopted Diaz and their sister, Anabelle, after their mother had been incarcerated. Just Sam was the topic of a short documentary in 2018 called Sam, Underground, which was shot and produced by Joe Penney and Ladan Osman. In the documentary, Just Sam stated that in high school, they were bullied for how they dressed, inspiring their "Just Sam" nickname.

Prior to appearing on American Idol, Just Sam made a living singing and busking in subway trains, and auditioned for America's Got Talent and the American iteration of The Voice, but neither one came to fruition.

== American Idol ==
Just Sam auditioned for the eighteenth season of the singing reality show American Idol in Washington, D.C., on October 14, 2019. After surviving Hollywood Week and making it into the Top 5, Just Sam received the most votes to win, and on May 17, 2020, Just Sam was crowned the winner of the eighteenth season of American Idol, beating runner-up Arthur Gunn.

Just Sam's victory was notable as having occurred during the nascent months of the COVID-19 pandemic; due to the pandemic, the show's production was initially suspended in March. The pandemic ultimately required the show to film remotely. While most remaining contestants performed remotely from their homes, rather than returning to their grandmother's home in New York City, Just Sam opted to remain in a rented apartment in Los Angeles, which was where most of their own live performances were filmed. The announcement of the winner was also filmed remotely and marked the first time the winner of American Idol was announced virtually.

Performances:
Week	Theme	Song(s)	Original artist(s)
Audition	Auditioner's Choice	"Rise Up"	Andra Day
Hollywood Week, Round 1	Contestant's Choice	"Hearts Ain't Gonna Lie"	Arlissa
Hollywood Week, Round 2	Duet	"Mercy" (with Sheniel Masionet)	Shawn Mendes
Hollywood Week, Round 3	Contestant's Choice	"I'm Here"	Cynthia Erivo
Top 40	Showcase Round in Kapolei, Hawaii	"Como la Flor"	Selena
Top 20	Contestant's Choice	"I Believe"	Fantasia
Top 11	Homeword Bound	"Grandma's Hands"	Bill Withers
Top 7	Disney Night	"A Dream Is a Wish Your Heart Makes"	from Cinderella
Top 7	Mother's Day	"I Turn to You"	All-4-One
Top 5 / Finale	Contestant's Choice	"Stronger (What Doesn't Kill You)"	Kelly Clarkson
Top 5 / Finale	Contestant's Choice	"Rise Up"	Andra Day

Non-competition performances:
Collaborator(s)	Song	Original artist
Lauren Daigle	"You Say"	Lauren Daigle
Cynthia Erivo & American Idol Top 11	Medley of Aretha Franklin songs	Aretha Franklin
Lionel Richie & American Idol Top 11	"We Are the World"	Michael Jackson & Lionel Richie

== Post-Idol ==
After winning American Idol in May 2020, Just Sam signed with Hollywood Records for a short period of time before they left the label without releasing any albums under it, explaining in 2022, "I thought it was gonna be easy. Just go to the studio, record, put out music, and that's not how the world works. That's not how the industry works. It takes time, it takes money that I don't have. It takes patience." Just Sam had to pay Hollywood Records to claim the music they recorded with the label, stating that they "ended up broke" in the process, but that they planned to release music "when I can and when it's ready."

On March 13, 2021, Just Sam released "Africando," their first single since American Idol, which they wrote with a co-songwriter named Cat Clark and released with the help of independent digital music service DistroKid.

On September 28, 2021, Just Sam released a second independent single called "Change," which they wrote and recorded with Cat Clark. They dedicated the song to family members and friends who were murder victims.

In 2023, Just Sam revealed that they had to return to busking in New York City's subways, three years after their win on American Idol. Just Sam stated that their return to busking was out of necessity: "If I ever went back to the trains, I didn't expect it to be something that I had to do. I felt like it would be something that I did for fun, you know, relive an old moment or memory, you know? But I literally could not afford to pay my rent. I couldn't afford to eat." Their situation bolstered scrutiny towards reality talent shows, including American Idol and The Voice, for the lack of support reality talent shows provide to their contestants following their seasons' conclusions. Afterwards, rapper Lil Durk and producer/rapper Timbaland offered support to Just Sam, with the latter featuring Just Sam performing live on a post on his TikTok page.

In late 2023, Just Sam signed a deal with the CrowdMGMT management company and got a new agent through the company.

On April 28, 2024, Just Sam was a guest performer on American Idol, performing a cover of "One Moment in Time" by Whitney Houston. The performance marked the first time Just Sam performed on the American Idol stage since their victory in 2020.

== Personal life ==
In a May 19, 2020, interview with Chuck Arnold of the New York Post, Just Sam stated, "I am a child of God, so that's always gonna come first. That's actually the only label that I ever want to have. But I like what I like, and that's just that, you know? And it's not men. Like, at all."

On August 24, 2022, Just Sam was admitted to the hospital for an undisclosed illness. Diaz's weight dropped to 100 pounds. On August 26, Diaz posted an update confirming, "I'm doing much better now."

In July 2025, Just Sam announced they were pregnant; in September 2025, they announced they had given birth to their first child.

Just Sam goes by singular 'they' pronouns.

== Discography ==
=== Singles ===
Year	Title	Album
2020	"Rise Up" (Performance Version)	Non-album single (released by Hollywood Records)
2021	"Africando"	Non-album single (released by Samantha Diaz through Just Sam Entertainment)
2021	"Change"	Non-album single (released by Samantha Diaz through Just Sam Entertainment)
2022	"Safe N Sound"	Non-album single (released by Samantha Diaz through Just Sam Entertainment)
2022	"Pain is Power"	Non-album single (released by Samantha Diaz through Just Sam Entertainment)
2022	"Question"	Non-album single (released by Samantha Diaz through Just Sam Entertainment)

== See also ==
- List of Afro-Latinos
