= Hannah Harper =

American singer-songwriter (born 1999)

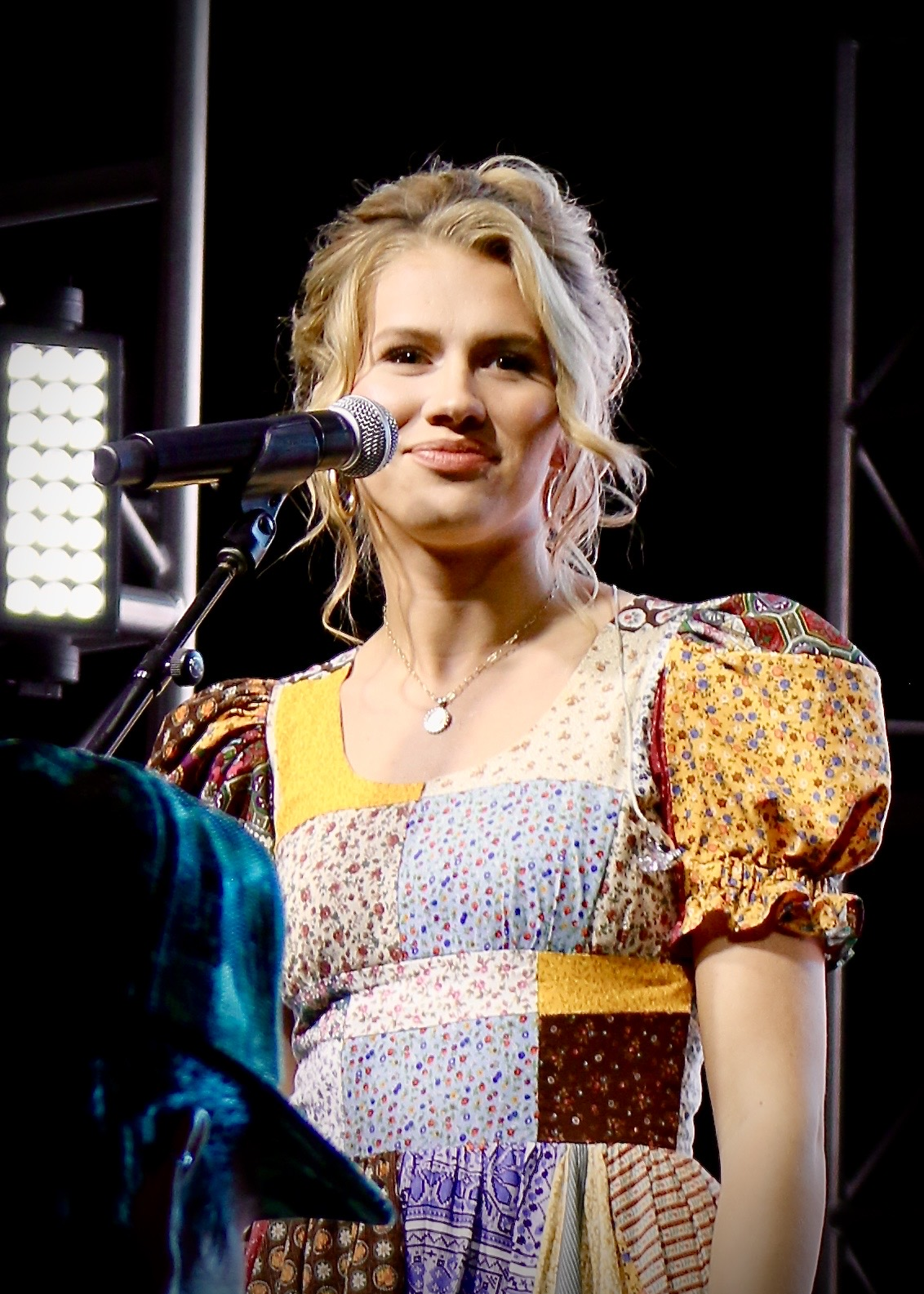
- Hannah Harper performs at the 2026 19 Recordings CMAfest Takeover in Nashville, TN.

Background information
- Born: November 19, 1999 (age 26); Bunker, Missouri, U.S.
- Origin: Willow Springs, Missouri, U.S.
- Genre: Country
- Instrument: Vocals
- Website: www.hannahharpermusic.com

Hannah Noelle Harper Mendenhall (born November 19, 1999) is an American country singer from Willow Springs, Missouri. She rose to prominence as the winner of the 24th season of American Idol in 2026, becoming the first female country singer to win the show since Carrie Underwood in the fourth season.

== Early and personal life ==
Hannah Harper was born in Bunker, Missouri and currently resides in Willow Springs, Missouri. She is the mother of three boys, and is a stay-at-home mom. She married her husband, Devon Mendenhall, in April 2018.

== Career ==
=== Beginnings ===
Harper has been singing since she was nine years old. Prior to auditioning for American Idol, Harper sang in her family's traveling bluegrass band, The Harper Collective, which she was part of for seven years, winning the SPBGMA International Band Contest in 2010. The band recorded a total of two albums. After stepping back from performing to raise her children, Harper wrote her first single, "String Cheese", which was released in May 2025. Harper describes the song as chronicling her battle with postpartum depression and finding strength through faith, purpose and motherhood.

=== 2026–present: American Idol ===
In 2026, Harper auditioned for the 24th season of the reality competition show American Idol. In the auditions round, she performed "String Cheese", which received acclaim from the show's judges (Luke Bryan, Carrie Underwood, and Lionel Richie) as well as the public audience. Harper progressed to the final of the show where she beat out fellow competitors Jordan McCullough and Keyla Richardson. After winning and singing Chris Tomlin's "At the Cross (Love Ran Red)" as her coronation song, Tomlin commented that they should "sing it together sometime". She won US$250,000 and a recording contract with Hollywood Records.

American Idol Season 24 performances and results
Round	Song	Artist	Result
Auditions	"String Cheese"	Hannah Harper	Advanced to Hollywood Round
Hollywood Round	"A Little Past Little Rock"	Lee Ann Womack	Advanced to Top 30
Top 30 ('Ohana Round)	"Go Rest High on That Mountain"	Vince Gill	Advanced to Top 20
Top 20	"Ain't No Grave"	Bethel Music & Molly Skaggs	Advanced to Top 14
Top 14 (Songs of Faith)	"At the Cross (Love Ran Red)"	Chris Tomlin	Advanced to Top 12
Top 12 (90s Judges' Song Contest)	"Heads Carolina, Tails California"	Jo Dee Messina	Advanced to Top 11
Top 11 (Rock & Roll Hall of Fame)	"Landslide"	Fleetwood Mac	Advanced to Top 9
Top 9 (Disney Night)	"Almost There"	Anika Noni Rose	Advanced to Top 7
Top 7 (Taylor Swift/California Songs Night)	"Mean" & "That's the Way Love Goes"	Taylor Swift & Merle Haggard	Advanced to Top 5
Top 5 (Class of 2006 Reunion)	"Fever" & "A Broken Wing" (sang with Kellie Pickler)	Peggy Lee & Martina McBride	Advanced to Finale
Final	"No One"	Alicia Keys	Winner
Final	"Married Into This Town"	Hannah Harper	Winner
Final	"String Cheese"	Hannah Harper	Winner
Final	"At the Cross (Love Ran Red)"	Chris Tomlin	Winner

== Artistry ==
Harper describes gaining musical inspiration from bluegrass and gospel music from her early years of performing. On American Idol, she ventured predominantly into country music but performed songs of several different genres in varying rounds. She cites singers such as Shania Twain and Jo Dee Messina as influences.

== Discography ==
=== Singles ===
List of singles, showing year released, and the name of the album
Title	Year	Album
"String Cheese"	2025	—N/a
