= Arthur Gunn =

American singer

- Birth name: Dibesh Pokharel
- Born: October 24, 1997 (age 27); Kathmandu, Nepal
- Origin: Wichita, Kansas, U.S.
- Genres: Folk rock; country; pop rock
- Occupations: Singer-songwriter; musician
- Instruments: Vocals; guitar
- Years active: 2014–present
- Website: Official website

Dibesh Pokharel (born October 24, 1997), known by his stage name Arthur Gunn, is a Nepalese-born American singer-songwriter from Wichita, Kansas, who came to national attention in 2020 as the runner-up finalist on the eighteenth season of the singing reality show American Idol. He started singing in 2014 and is known for his "textured, sandpapery" vocals. He released his eight-song debut album, Grahan, in early 2018. He released another album, KHOJ, in 2019 with singles including "Ma," "Khoj" and "Karnali (The River)."

== Early life and education ==
Dibesh Pokharel (Dibesh means light) was born October 24, 1997, in Kathmandu—the metropolis capital of around 2.5 million people in the country of Nepal—to parents Datram and Maiya. His family, including four sisters—including Rubi, Rupa, and Supriya—were not musical, although he was exposed to music at an early age and grew up with it in his life; they noted as a child he sang and played small guitars his mother gave him. His family would play records and music, and he wanted to do that as well. From the age of two he would blend songs together while playing the guitar. His first experience with American Idol was watching the U.S. version online while growing up. He also learned English in Nepal. "I got my first guitar from my mom and then I started singing along to any song I could hear on the radio, TVs, you know. That's when the dream [to perform] started." His family emigrated to Wichita, Kansas, around 2008 when he was eleven but he remained and finished school. Later he would sing in pubs and coffee houses, but mainly for gatherings of friends; he eventually recorded some songs. He started taking his singing seriously in 2012/2013.

He immigrated to Wichita, Kansas around 2014 after graduating high school, and following his sisters who were in school in the U.S., and then was joined by his parents; there he was introduced to bluegrass and country music. He bought a new guitar and befriended musicians and played the city's coffeehouses. He traveled and busked on street corners in Los Angeles, San Francisco, New York, and a summer at the Ocean City, Maryland boardwalk. He cites as inspirations and influences: John Martyn, Nick Drake, Bob Dylan, Bukka White, Robert Johnson, Howlin' Wolf, Sonny Boy Williamson, Jimmy Page, Joe Cocker, Mississippi John Hurt, John Lee Hooker, Ray LaMontagne and Ben Howard. His musician friends urged him to audition for American Idol, and Gunn knew he wanted to be a professional singer-songwriter, and decided it was a good opportunity to learn more about the industry.

== Career ==
=== Early career: Grahan ===
Gunn first recorded songs in 2018 and around the same time started using his stage name. He was reading Arthur Rimbaud's—an influential French poet from the 1800s—work, "His words were so modern and I thought his name Arthur would be a good stage name. A lot of people know me as Dibesh but Arthur is easier to use as a stage name." The name was chosen somewhat randomly but it starts with art, he said: "I am fascinated with art in every form and outcomes it can create." He also explained, "Hur is a biblical name, which means 'Hole', nothing religious, though. Meanwhile, 'Gunn' symbolizes battle". When he started to seriously sing in 2013 he worked on shaping his voice, and then had mentors who taught him breathing techniques, and then enhancing his vocals. The Voice of Sikkim noted Gunn is one of the latest talented singers from the Nepal area including Prashant Tamang, winner of the third season of Indian Idol; Prakriti Deuja, the first Nepalese American to sing "The Star-Spangled Banner" at a National Basketball Association game in 2014; Nisha Rasaily, and Passang Doma Lama.

His debut, Grahan, is an eight-song Nepali language album including the love song "Nyano Ghar", released in early 2018. Grahan means "about day and night, the sun and the moon". According to Heavy, "his Nepali songs have infused the sounds of artists such as Bob Dylan, Robert Johnson, and Bukka White", and he received praise for his "sweet and anguished" vocals. He toured in Nepal to support the album, and recorded new songs in 2019, including "Ma", "Khoj", and "Karnali (The River)", which he released in December; all of which to be a part of a new album. In February 2020, his YouTube channel had nearly 70,000 subscribers, as of April 2020 that rose to 230,000.

=== American Idol ===
Gunn submitted an audition online for American Idol in 2019, and was invited to the September 4 in-person Wichita, Kansas, auditions for the eighteenth season of the show at Century II Performing Arts & Convention Center. It was one of twenty-two cities the producers visited over a four-month period "Bus Tour," and the first time American Idol had visited the city since the show began in 2002. He auditioned with Sticky Fingers' "Eddy's Song" (2011); as of May 2020 the video has been seen over eight million times. Gunn notes as his favorite American Idol alumni both 2019's winner Laine Hardy, and runner-up Alejandro Aranda.

Gunn was featured in a December 2019 sneak peek for the show, the clip showed a portion of his audition with the show's judges; Luke Bryan stated, "I think he might be the biggest star we've ever had on 'American Idol.'" Gunn is also one of several dozen contestants featured in a February 2020 American Idol commercial that premiered during the Academy Awards, and went into "heavy rotation", it pays tribute to a scene in Almost Famous (2000), with American Idol host Ryan Seacrest driving a bus full of contestants singing along to Elton John's "Tiny Dancer". Seacrest tags the end of the scene by stating the contestants were almost famous. Gunn knew he wanted to be a professional musician but had been uncertain about American Idol; he has become "amazed" at the experience, "I've learned so many things about performing and being an artist and the music industry."

Hollywood Week was filmed December 2–5, 2019, at the Orpheum Theatre in Los Angeles, California with 167 contestants. For the first round Gunn self-selected the singer-songwriter music genre and had to be encouraged by the judges to keep singing a second verse of his choice, "Hard to Handle" (1968) by Otis Redding. For the duet round he partnered with Amber Fiedler who was eliminated later on in the Hawaiian Showcase. He reprised "Have You Ever Seen the Rain?" (1971) by Creedence Clearwater Revival for the Solo round but did his own arrangement. Gunn passed onto the Top Forty and advanced to the Showcase round performing for a live audience—including his parents and sisters—in Kapolei, Hawaii, at the Aulani resort. His sisters mentioned how proud they were, especially as Arthur has not had any formal training until the show. The two-episode Showcase/Final Judgement round determines the Top Twenty and was filmed in January 2020. Gunn was shown on the second night performing "Is This Love?" (1978) by Bob Marley and the Wailers. Judge Lionel Richie said that advancing him to the Top Twenty was one of the easiest decisions they had to make. Gunn is the third Top Twenty contestant from the Wichita area since the show started after Rickey Smith who finished in eighth place in 2003 on the second season, and Phil Stacey, who came in sixth in 2007 on the sixth season.

Taping was suspended after the Top Twenty were selected, and the contestants sent home, due to COVID-19 (coronavirus) pandemic. The rest of the season the show filmed all the on-air talent from their homes. The producers equipped each contestant with similar sound and lighting equipment so they could film from home. When asked who Gunn would like to duet with if he made it to the finale, his list included The Black Keys, Jack Johnson and Damian Marley. In May 2020 Gunn became the first Nepali-born contestant in the Top Ten on the show; he performed a reggae version of John Denver's "Take Me Home, Country Roads" for the show's theme of evoking songs of home. Popculture's Kyle Phillippi noted Gunn's voice has been praised by the show's judges from the beginning as "the most unique", Gunn said, "I have been told that I have a husky tone to my voice that I open the diaphragm more than others." He added, "I don't use a lot of my head voice or nasal voice, and I am still learning my voice, but I don't have a particular way to define my voice."

For the live finale, the top five, including Gunn were announced live from the Top Seven, and they performed two rounds of songs while East coast viewers voted for their favorites during the show. (Note: The west coast was also able to vote but only before any of the performances were aired.) The first round were celebration songs with Gunn singing Gavin DeGraw's 2003 single "I Don't Want to Be". The second round was the contestant's intended debut single if they won with Gunn again singing Creedence Clearwater Revival's "Have You Ever Seen the Rain?" (1971). Both Gunn and Just Sam were announced as top two finalists, with Sam declared the winner. Gunn is seen as a trailblazer by Nepali musicians who hope more people from their country will feel empowered to sign up for competitions.

Performances:
Week	Theme	Song(s)	Original artist(s)
Online audition	N/A	• "Eddy's Song" (2011)	• Sticky Fingers off their Happy Endings EP
Audition	N/A	• "Girl from the North Country" (1963), • "Have You Ever Seen the Rain?" (1971)	• Bob Dylan, • Creedence Clearwater Revival
Hollywood week	• Genre challenge, (Note: Contestants self-selected to one of six genres (Rock, R&B, Soul, Pop, Country, and Gunn's choice, singer-songwriter), and were judged compared to the group they optioned.) • Duet with Amber Fiedler, (Note: Fiedler was eliminated during the Top Forty Showcase round.) • Solo	• "Hard to Handle" (1968), • "The Chain" (1977), (Note: Although not their full performance, a snippet of Arthur Gunn and Amber Fielder's duet song is shown.) • "Have You Ever Seen the Rain?" (1971)	• Otis Redding and The Black Crowes, (Note: Redding was the original artist in 1968, but Gunn credited both his and The Black Crowes (1990) versions.) • Fleetwood Mac, • Creedence Clearwater Revival (Gunn arrangement)
Top Forty	Showcase round in Kapolei, Hawaii	• "Is This Love?" (1978)	• Bob Marley and the Wailers
Top Twenty	Start of remote shows	• "Lovin' Machine" (1952)	• Wynonie Harris
Top Ten: "Homeward Bound"	Songs that remind of home	• "Take Me Home, Country Roads" (1971)	• John Denver
Top Seven	Disney music / Mother's Day	• "Kiss the Girl" (1989) from The Little Mermaid • "Hey, Ma" (2019)	• Samuel Wright in his role as Sebastian • Bon Iver
Finale	• Round 1: Celebration songs • Round 2: Debut single if they win	• "I Don't Want to Be" (2003) • "Have You Ever Seen the Rain?" (1971)	• Gavin DeGraw • Creedence Clearwater Revival
Finale: Group song	Cynthia Erivo & Idol Top Eleven, medley: • "I Never Loved a Man (The Way I Love You)" (1967) • "Rock Steady" (1971) • "Chain of Fools" (1967)	Aretha Franklin	
Finale: Group song	Lionel Richie, Idol Top Eleven, Idol judges and alums: • "We Are the World" (1985)	Various, 45 top pop stars	

=== Post-Idol, Self-Titled ===
In June 2020, Gunn was one of the featured singers for a virtual arts event hosted by the U.S. Embassy in Kathmandu. In July 2020, he released a seven-song album, Self-Titled, produced by Angelo Rodriguez.

As of June 2022, his YouTube channel has 490,000 subscribers. His most watched video, as of July 2020, is "Nyano Ghar" (House of warmth), released May 2018, has over six million views on YouTube. His latest song is "Love is My Redemption".

== Discography ==
=== Albums ===
- 2018: Grahan
- 2020: Jalai Mai
- 2021: Khoj
- 2024: Ojhel
