= American Idol season 18 =

American Idol
- Season 18
- Promotional poster
- Hosted by: Ryan Seacrest
- Judges: Luke Bryan; Katy Perry; Lionel Richie
- Winner: Just Sam
- Runner-up: Arthur Gunn
- No. of episodes: 16

Release
- Original network: ABC
- Original release: February 16 – May 17, 2020

Season chronology
- ← Previous; Season 17 Next → Season 19

The eighteenth season of American Idol premiered on February 16, 2020, on the ABC television network. Luke Bryan, Katy Perry, and Lionel Richie returned as judges, while Ryan Seacrest continued as host. Bobby Bones returned as the in-house mentor.

Taping was suspended after the top 19 were revealed and the contestants were sent home due to the COVID-19 pandemic. The show resumed production in late April, with the on-air talent and contestants filming from their homes. The stay-at-home and social-distancing mandates, according to Billboard, compelled producers "to get very, very creative this time around to keep season 18 afloat amid the most challenging conditions in show history." Up to forty-five remote sites were used and each contestant was treated equally, with access to similar equipment and resources. Segments were usually taped a day in advance, except for the judges' critiques and voting results, which aired live.

On May 17, 2020, Just Sam was crowned as the winner, with Arthur Gunn finishing as the runner-up.

Due to this season's contestants never having an opportunity to perform on the live stage because of COVID-19 safety restrictions, American Idol invited ten contestants back onto the following season to compete for a re-entry spot—as voted upon by the public—as part of the top ten, after which they would still be eligible for votes or elimination as usual. This group included three finalists (runner-up Gunn; Louis Knight; and Makayla Phillips) and seven semi-finalists (Aliana Jester, Cyniah Elise, DeWayne Crocker Jr., Faith Becnel, Franklin Boone, Nick Merico, and Olivia Ximines), with Gunn ultimately being selected by the public's votes to join Season 19. He tied with Hunter Metts for sixth place.

== Regional auditions ==
American Idol (season 18) – regional auditions
City	Filming date(s)	Filming venue	Ref.
Savannah, Georgia	September 30 – October 1, 2019	Perry Lane Hotel	
Milwaukee, Wisconsin	October 8–9, 2019	Milwaukee Art Museum	
Washington, D.C.	October 14–15, 2019	The Wharf	
Los Angeles, California	November 1–2, 2019	South Park Center	
Portland, Oregon	November 7–8, 2019	Great Hall (Sunriver Resort)	

== Hollywood week ==
Hollywood week was filmed December 2–5, 2019, at the Orpheum Theatre in Los Angeles. There were several changes in format this season. In the first round, each contestant chose and performed a song from a selection of musical genres (pop, rock, R&B, soul, country, or singer-songwriter). Those who impressed the judges and the producers were advanced to the next round. Instead of group performances as had been done in previous seasons, contestants paired up and performed duets. They were given twelve hours to rehearse, which included a session with a vocal coach and a stage rehearsal. Judges could advance either, neither, or both of the contestants to the next round, where they performed their final solos before advancing to the Showcase round.

== Showcase round ==
The Showcase round aired on March 29 and April 5, and featured the top 40 performing for the judges and a live audience at Disney's Aulani resort in Kapolei, Hawaii. The following day, the judges narrowed the number of contestants down from 40 to 20. The following is a list of the first nineteen contestants who reached the top 20 and the song they performed at the Showcase. For the twentieth and final spot, Grace Leer and Lauren Mascetti's result was determined by a vote from the public, which was revealed on April 19. Contestants are listed in the order they performed.

Showcase round (March 29 & April 5)
Contestant	Song
Nick Merico	"When I Was Your Man"
DeWayne Crocker, Jr.	"Old Town Road"
Louis Knight	"Castle on the Hill"
Francisco Martin	"Falling"
Jovin Webb	"You Are the Best Thing"
Faith Becnel	"Ain't Nobody"
Just Sam	"Como la Flor"
Jonny West	"You Found Me"
Dillon James	"The Times They Are a-Changin'"
Franklin Boone	"Daughters"
Julia Gargano	"Glitter in the Air"
Aliana Jester	"This is Me"
Sophia James	"Levels"
Kimmy Gabriela	"You Don't Do It for Me Anymore"
Cyniah Elise	"Lady Marmalade"
Makayla Phillips	"Sorry Not Sorry"
Lauren Spencer-Smith	"Respect"
Olivia Ximines	"Proud Mary"
Arthur Gunn	"Is This Love"

Showcase voting round (April 19)
Contestant	Song	Result
Grace Leer	"(You Make Me Feel Like) A Natural Woman"	Advanced
Lauren Mascetti	"Two More Bottles of Wine"	Eliminated

== Finals ==
After a short hiatus, production resumed and all contestants performed remotely due to safety measures in place during the COVID-19 pandemic. Additionally, Ryan Seacrest and the judges were also broadcast from their homes.

Color key:

This contestant was saved by America's vote.
This contestant was not chosen by the public, but was chosen by the judges as a Wild Card pick.
This contestant was eliminated.
This contestant won American Idol.
This contestant was the runner-up.
This contestant finished as a finalist in the finale.

=== Top 20 (April 26) ===
The ten contestants who received the most votes continued on, while the judges were granted a one-time judges' save, which they used to save Makayla Phillips from elimination. Contestants are listed in the order they performed.

Top 20 (April 26)
Contestant	Song	Result
Kimmy Gabriela	"Leave Me Lonely"	Eliminated
Jovin Webb	"With a Little Help from My Friends"	Safe
Franklin Boone	"Everybody Wants to Rule the World"	Eliminated
Olivia Ximines	"Bad Guy"	Eliminated
Louis Knight	"If the World Was Ending"	Safe
Makayla Phillips	"Greedy"	Saved
Aliana Jester	"Run to You"	Eliminated
Faith Becnel	"River"	Eliminated
Nick Merico	"Hey There Delilah"	Eliminated
Lauren Spencer-Smith	"Mamma Knows Best"	Eliminated
Cyniah Elise	"Warrior"	Eliminated
Francisco Martin	"Teenage Dream"	Safe
Sophia James	"Burning"	Safe
DeWayne Crocker Jr.	"I Got You (I Feel Good)"	Eliminated
Dillon James	"Let It Be Me"	Safe
Arthur Gunn	"Lovin' Machine"	Safe
Julia Gargano	"Human"	Safe
Grace Leer	"Cry"	Safe
Just Sam	"I Believe"	Safe
Jonny West	"What a Wonderful World"	Safe

=== Top 11 (May 3) ===
Contestants are listed in the order they performed.

Top 11 (May 3)
Contestant	Song	Result
Louis Knight	"In My Place"	Safe
Julia Gargano	"New York State of Mind"	Safe
Jovin Webb	"Voodoo"	Eliminated
Grace Leer	"Over the Rainbow"	Eliminated
Jonny West	"Faithfully"	Safe
Sophia James	"In My Room"	Eliminated
Arthur Gunn	"Take Me Home, Country Roads"	Safe
Just Sam	"Grandma's Hands"	Safe
Dillon James	"Yesterday"	Safe
Francisco Martin	"Falling Like the Stars"	Safe
Makayla Phillips	"The House That Built Me"	Eliminated

Non-competition performance
Performers	Song
Phillip Phillips	"Home"

=== Top 7 – Disney and Mother's Day (May 10) ===
Each contestant performed two songs: one song from a Disney movie, and one song in honor of Mother's Day. Contestants are listed in the order they performed.

Top 7 (May 10)
Contestant	Order	Song	Result
Arthur Gunn	1	"Kiss the Girl" (from The Little Mermaid)	Safe
Arthur Gunn	8	"Hey, Ma"	Safe
Just Sam	2	"A Dream Is a Wish Your Heart Makes" (from Cinderella)	Safe
Just Sam	9	"I Turn to You"	Safe
Jonny West	3	"Almost There" (from The Princess and the Frog)	Safe
Jonny West	10	"Amazing Grace"	Safe
Louis Knight	4	"Can You Feel the Love Tonight" (from The Lion King)	Eliminated
Louis Knight	11	"You've Got a Friend"	Eliminated
Julia Gargano	5	"Beauty and the Beast" (from Beauty and the Beast)	Eliminated
Julia Gargano	12	"Sweetest Devotion"	Eliminated
Francisco Martin	6	"You'll Be in My Heart" (from Tarzan)	Safe
Francisco Martin	13	"River"	Safe
Dillon James	7	"Our Town" (from Cars)	Safe
Dillon James	14	"Hang On, Hang On"	Safe

Non-competition performance
Performers	Song
Laine Hardy	"Life Is a Highway"

=== Top 5 – Finale (May 17) ===
Each contestant performed two songs, and are listed in the order they performed.

Contestant	Order	Song	Result
Dillon James	1	"Change the World"	Finalist
Dillon James	6	"The Times They Are a-Changin'"	Finalist
Francisco Martin	2	"Adore You"	Finalist
Francisco Martin	7	"Alaska"	Finalist
Just Sam	3	"Stronger (What Doesn't Kill You)"	Winner
Just Sam	8	"Rise Up"	Winner
Arthur Gunn	4	"I Don't Want to Be"	Runner-up
Arthur Gunn	9	"Have You Ever Seen the Rain?"	Runner-up
Jonny West	5	"Can't Keep a Good Man Down"	Finalist
Jonny West	10	"Makin' Love"	Finalist

Non-competition performances
Performers	Song
Luke Bryan	"One Margarita"
Doug Kiker with Rascal Flatts	"Bless the Broken Road"
Just Sam with Lauren Daigle	"You Say"
Katy Perry	"Daisies"
Top 11 with Cynthia Erivo	Aretha Franklin medley
Top 11 with Lionel Richie and American Idol alumni^{1}	"We Are the World"

^1 Alejandro Aranda, Fantasia, Gabby Barrett, Jordin Sparks, Katharine McPhee, Kellie Pickler, Laine Hardy, Lauren Alaina, Phillip Phillips, Ruben Studdard and Scotty McCreery were former contestants who sang with the American Idol Top 11 contestants with Lionel Richie.

== Elimination chart ==
Color key:

Winner
Runner-up
Finalist
Saved by the public
Saved by the judges
Eliminated

American Idol (season 18) – Eliminations
Contestant	Pl.	Top 20	Top 11	Top 7	Finale
Contestant	Pl.	4/26	5/3	5/10	5/17
Just Sam	1	Safe	Safe	Safe	Winner
Arthur Gunn	2	Safe	Safe	Safe	Runner-up
Dillon James	3	Safe	Safe	Safe	Finalist
Francisco Martin	3	Safe	Safe	Safe	Finalist
Jonny West	3	Safe	Safe	Safe	Finalist
Julia Gargano	6	Safe	Safe	Eliminated	
Louis Knight	6	Safe	Safe	Eliminated	
Sophia James	8	Safe	Eliminated		
Grace Leer	8	Safe	Eliminated		
Makayla Phillips	8	Saved	Eliminated		
Jovin Webb	8	Safe	Eliminated		
Faith Becnel		Eliminated			
Franklin Boone		Eliminated			
Dewayne Crocker Jr.		Eliminated			
Cyniah Elise		Eliminated			
Kimmy Gabriela		Eliminated			
Aliana Jester		Eliminated			
Nick Merico		Eliminated			
Lauren Spencer-Smith		Eliminated			
Olivia Ximines		Eliminated			

== Ratings ==
Viewership and ratings per episode of American Idol season 18
No.	Title	Air date	Timeslot (ET)	Rating/share (18–49)	Viewers (millions)	DVR (18–49)	DVR viewers (millions)	Total (18–49)	Total viewers (millions)
1	"Auditions, Part 1"	February 16, 2020	Sunday 8:00 p.m.	1.5/7	8.08	0.4	1.86	1.9	9.94
2	"Auditions, Part 2"	February 23, 2020	Sunday 8:00 p.m.	1.4/7	7.50	0.4	1.65	1.8	9.15
3	"Auditions, Part 3"	March 1, 2020	Sunday 8:00 p.m.	1.3/6	7.00	0.4	1.66	1.7	8.66
4	"Auditions, Part 4"	March 8, 2020	Sunday 8:00 p.m.	1.3/6	7.26	0.4	1.56	1.7	8.82
5	"Auditions, Part 5"	March 15, 2020	Sunday 8:00 p.m.	1.3/6	7.47	0.4	1.59	1.7	9.07
6	"Hollywood Week – Genre Challenge"	March 16, 2020	Monday 8:00 pm	1.2/6	6.30	0.4	1.95	1.6	8.25
7	"Hollywood Week – Duets"	March 22, 2020	Sunday 8:00 p.m.	1.4/7	7.70	0.4	1.69	1.8	9.39
8	"Hollywood Week – Solos"	March 23, 2020	Monday 8:00 p.m.	1.4/7	7.02	0.4	1.80	1.8	8.82
9	"Hawaii Showcase and Final Judgment, Part 1"	March 29, 2020	Sunday 8:00 p.m.	1.3/6	7.33	0.4	1.68	1.7	9.00
10	"Hawaii Showcase and Final Judgment, Part 2"	April 5, 2020	Sunday 8:00 p.m.	1.2/6	6.93	0.4	1.63	1.6	8.56
11	"This Is Me, Part 1"	April 12, 2020	Sunday 8:00 p.m.	1.0/4	5.63	0.2	1.12	1.2	6.75
12	"This Is Me, Part 2"	April 19, 2020	Sunday 8:00 p.m.	0.8/4	5.48	0.2	0.95	1.0	5.48
13	"Top 20 Sing For America"	April 26, 2020	Sunday 8:00 p.m.	1.0/5	6.09	0.3	1.49	1.3	7.58
14	"Top 10 Homeward Bound"	May 3, 2020	Sunday 8:00 p.m.	0.9/5	6.41	0.2	1.19	1.1	7.60
15	"Disney Night/Mother's Day"	May 10, 2020	Sunday 8:00 p.m.	1.0/6	6.16	0.3	1.28	1.3	7.44
16	"Grand Finale"	May 17, 2020	Sunday 8:00 p.m.	1.0/5	7.28	0.2	1.06	1.2	8.34
