= American Idol season 24 =

American Idol
- Season 24
- Promotional poster
- Hosted by: Ryan Seacrest
- Judges: Luke Bryan; Carrie Underwood; Lionel Richie
- Winner: Hannah Harper
- Runner-up: Jordan McCollough
- No. of episodes: 16

Release
- Original network: ABC / Disney+ (March 30 onwards)
- Original release: January 26 – May 11, 2026

Season chronology
- ← Previous; Season 23

The twenty-fourth season of American Idol premiered on January 26, 2026, on ABC. Ryan Seacrest returned as host; Luke Bryan, Lionel Richie, and Carrie Underwood returned as judges.

Hannah Harper won the season on May 11, 2026, while Jordan McCullough was the runner-up, and Keyla Richardson finished in third place.

== Auditions ==
Remote auditions were held from August 26 to October 6, 2025, as well as a number of open-call auditions. From these auditions, producers of the show selected the contestants who would be invited to audition in front of the judges. Unlike previous seasons, where auditions were hosted in various cities, in-person auditions were only held at one site, Belmont University in Nashville.

American Idol (season 24) – auditions
City	Filming date(s)	Filming venue
Nashville	November 3, 2025	Belmont University

== Hollywood Week ==
For the first time, Hollywood Week was not held in or near Hollywood (despite retaining its name). Instead, it was held in Nashville and was dubbed the "Music City Takeover". A total of 127 contestants advanced to this stage of the competition. Each contestant performed a song of their own choice. After a select number of performances, several contestants at a time were called to the stage, and the judges sent some to the adjacent "Golden Room" which was a holding room for those who could advance, while the rest were eliminated. After all contestants performed, 60 were sent to the Golden Room while the judges made their final decisions, and the rest were eliminated.

Of those in the Golden Room, 28 of them were chosen as part of the Top 30, while another 28 were eliminated. The last four contestants performed two sing-offs of which one in each advanced, and the other was eliminated. The contestants who made it to the top 30 were: Makiyah, Jordan McCullough, Lucas Leon, Bella Emry, Madison Moon, Keyla Richardson, Braden Rumfelt, Chris Tungseth, Jake Thistle, Tianna Roberts, Philmon Lee, Brooks Rosser, Daniel Stallworth, Kutter Bradley, Bryant Thomas, Jesse Findling, Julián Kalel, Sheldon Riley, Brianna Yancey, Kiera Howell, Kyndal Inskeep, Hannah Harper, Ruby Rae, Jacquie Lee, Brenna Brigman, Rae, Genevieve Heyward, Abayomi, Michael Garner, and Chloe Lauren.

== 'Ohana Round ==
The top 30 from Hollywood Week advanced to the next round known as the 'Ohana Round, which occurred at Disney's Aulani resort in Kapolei, Hawaii. Three performers were awarded Platinum Tickets by the contestants, the contestants' friends and family, and a panel of musicians and other industry figures respectively.

After the 'Ohana Round, the Top 20 was selected; of the contestants in the Top 20, the three that received a platinum ticket were Jordan McCullough (voted by fellow contestants), Brooks (voted by friends and family), and Kyndal Inskeep (voted by musicians and industry figures).

Top 20 qualifiers
Contestant	Song
Jordan McCullough	"Grandma's Hands"
Lucas Leon	"The House That Built Me"
Keyla Richardson	"A Thousand Years"
Braden Rumfelt	"If I Ain't Got You"
Hannah Harper	"Go Rest High on That Mountain"
Genevieve Heyward	"Your Song"
Abayomi	"Rise Up"
Ruby Rae	"Till Forever Falls Apart"
Rae	"I'll Be There"
Jake Thistle	"Sleep on Me" (original song)
Brooks	"Everywhere, Everything"
Madison Moon	"Faithfully"
Daniel Stallworth	"The Climb"
Chris Tungseth	"Iris"
Jesse Findling	"Photograph"
Julián Kalel	"Surrender" (original song)
Kutter Bradley	"Amarillo Sky"
Kyndal Inskeep	"Woman of Me" (original song)
Philmon Lee	"All I Want"
Makiyah	"Stand Up"

== Top 20 (March 16 and 23) ==
The top 20 contestants were split into two groups of ten and performed a song each at Aulani. The first group's performances aired on March 16, while the second group aired on March 23. Brad Paisley and Keke Palmer both served as guest mentors during the round. Contestants are listed in the order they performed. The songs performed by the Top 20 and onwards were published on all music streaming platforms.

Color key:

This contestant was saved by America's vote.
This contestant was eliminated.

Group 1 (March 16)
Contestant	Song	Result
Makiyah	"Bang Bang"	Eliminated
Jake Thistle	"The Power of Love"	Safe
Genevieve Hayward	"Pink Pony Club"	Eliminated
Daniel Stallworth	"All Night Long"	Safe
Kyndal Inskeep	"Call Your Mom"	Safe
Kutter Bradley	"It's Not Over"	Eliminated
Jesse Findling	"You Found Me"	Safe
Hannah Harper	"Ain't No Grave"	Safe
Braden Rumfelt	"Love On The Brain"	Safe
Brooks	"Dancing On My Own"	Safe

Group 2 (March 23)
Contestant	Song	Result
Philmon Lee	"Don't Stop Believin'"	Safe
Rae	"Respect"	Safe
Lucas Leon	"Just to See You Smile"	Safe
Jordan McCullough	"I Still Haven't Found What I'm Looking For"	Safe
Abayomi	"Mamma Knows Best"	Eliminated
Madison Moon	"Since U Been Gone"	Eliminated
Chris Tungseth	"Apologize"	Safe
Ruby Rae	"Drag Me Down"	Eliminated
Julián Kalel	"Tourniquet"	Safe
Keyla Richardson	"With A Little Help From My Friends"	Safe

Non-competition performances (March 16)
Performer	Song
Iam Tongi	"Good for My Soul"
Iam Tongi & Thunderstorm Artis	"Island Style"

Non-competition performance (March 23)
Performer	Song
Skip Marley	"One Love/People Get Ready"

== Finals ==
Color key:

This contestant was saved by America's vote.
This contestant was saved by the judges.
This contestant was eliminated.
This contestant won American Idol.
This contestant was the runner-up.
This contestant finished in third place.

=== Top 14 – Songs of Faith (March 30) ===
Each contestant performed a song from the Songs of Faith songbook. No contestants were eliminated on March 30, as the social media votes were not totaled by the end of the broadcast. The eliminations were announced during the April 6 broadcast.

Top 14 (March 30)
Contestant	Song	Result
Keyla Richardson	"Jireh"	Safe
Jesse Findling	"Bless The Broken Road"	Safe
Lucas Leon	"Gratitude"	Safe
Daniel Stallworth	"Brighter Days"	Safe
Philmon Lee	"Simple Man"	Safe
Rae	"Up To The Mountain"	Safe
Jake Thistle	"Have A Little Faith In Me"	Eliminated
Braden Rumfelt	"Hard Fought Hallelujah"	Safe
Julián Kalel	"Fix You"	Eliminated
Kyndal Inskeep	"Nothing But The Blood Of Jesus"	Safe
Jordan McCullough	"I Can Only Imagine"	Safe
Brooks	"Imagine"	Safe
Hannah Harper	"At The Cross"	Safe
Chris Tungseth	"By Your Grace"	Safe

Non-competition performances
Performer	Song
Luke Bryan, Lionel Richie & The Top 20	"Jesus Is Love"
Carrie Underwood, Canaan James Hill, Kolbi Jordan & Filo	"How Great Thou Art"

=== Top 12 – 90s Judges' Song Contest (April 6) ===
Contestants were given three songs, each selected by the judges, to choose from. After each performance, contestants guessed who chose their song. The theme for the round was "90s" and every song choice was from the 1990s. Lionel Richie had the most song choices selected by the contestants, and was able to save one contestant from elimination.

This was the first live episode of the season, but due to the change from Sunday nights to Monday nights, this - and all other episodes for the rest of the season - were shown live only in the Eastern and Central time zones, with a delayed broadcast in points west, on ABC affiliates. In contrast, the Disney+ simulcast stream (which began the previous week) was still live in all time zones.

Top 12 (April 6)
Contestant	Song	Selected by	Result
Hannah Harper	"Heads Carolina, Tails California"	Carrie Underwood	Safe
Jordan McCullough	"Always Be My Baby"	Lionel Richie	Safe
Daniel Stallworth	"It Ain't Over Til' It's Over"	Luke Bryan	Safe
Lucas Leon	"It's Your Love"	Lionel Richie	Safe
Chris Tungseth	"I'll Be"	Carrie Underwood	Safe
Philmon Lee	"Hard to Handle"	Luke Bryan	Safe
Kyndal Inskeep	"Iris"	Lionel Richie	Safe
Brooks	"Linger"	Lionel Richie	Safe
Rae	"Love Will Lead You Back"	Carrie Underwood	Saved by Lionel
Braden Rumfelt	"All By Myself"	Lionel Richie	Safe
Jesse Findling	"Wonderwall"	Lionel Richie	Eliminated
Keyla Richardson	"Zombie"	Lionel Richie	Safe

=== Top 11 – Rock & Roll Hall of Fame (April 13) ===
Pat Benatar and Neil Giraldo served as a guest mentors this week. Each contestant performed one song from inductees of the Rock and Roll Hall of Fame.

Top 11 (April 13)
Contestant	Song	Result
Chris Tungseth	"Cold as Ice"	Safe
Rae	"MacArthur Park"	Eliminated
Braden Rumfelt	"Superstition"	Safe
Brooks	"These Days"	Safe
Daniel Stallworth	"Livin' on a Prayer"	Safe
Keyla Richardson	"Signed, Sealed, Delivered, I'm Yours"	Safe
Lucas Leon	"Bennie and the Jets"	Safe
Kyndal Inskeep	"Piece of My Heart"	Safe
Philmon Lee	"Hot Blooded"	Eliminated
Hannah Harper	"Landslide"	Safe
Jordan McCollough	"Somebody To Love"	Safe

Non-competition performances
Performer	Song
Carrie Underwood & Billy Idol	"Rebel Yell"
Pat Benatar & Neil Giraldo	"Heartbreaker" "Ring of Fire"

=== Top 9 – Disney Night (April 20) ===
Jennifer Hudson served as a guest mentor and guest judge this week. Each contestant performed one song from a Disney film. The Top 9 went to Disneyland before the episode. Contestants are listed in the order they performed.

Top 9 (April 20)
Contestant	Song	Disney film	Result
Daniel Stallworth	"A Whole New World"	Aladdin	Safe
Braden Rumfelt	"Remember Me"	Coco	Safe
Lucas Leon	"Life Is a Highway"	Cars	Eliminated
Hannah Harper	"Almost There"	The Princess and the Frog	Safe
Chris Tungseth	"Let It Go"	Frozen	Safe
Keyla Richardson	"Circle of Life"	The Lion King	Safe
Brooks	"The Climb"	Hannah Montana: The Movie	Safe
Jordan McCollough	"Colors of the Wind"	Pocahontas	Safe
Kyndal Inskeep	"Butterfly Fly Away"	Hannah Montana: The Movie	Eliminated

Non-competition performances
Performer(s)	Song
Top 9	"You've Got a Friend in Me"
The cast of Descendants: Wicked Wonderland (Malia Baker, Liamani Segura, Kiara Romero, Brendon Tremblay and Alexandro Byrd)	"Perfect Princess"

=== Top 7 – Taylor Swift / California Songs Night (April 27) ===
Nikki Glaser served as a guest judge this week. Each contestant performed one song from the songbook of Taylor Swift and another by artists from California. Contestants are listed in the order they performed.

Top 7 (April 27)
Contestant	Order	Song	Result
Jordan McCullough	1	"Tim McGraw"	Safe
Jordan McCullough	9	"I Can't Make You Love Me"	Safe
Chris Tungseth	2	"Exile"	Safe
Chris Tungseth	12	"What Was I Made For?"	Safe
Hannah Harper	3	"Mean"	Safe
Hannah Harper	13	"That's the Way Love Goes"	Safe
Brooks	4	"Love Story"	Eliminated
Brooks	8	"She Will Be Loved"	Eliminated
Daniel Stallworth	5	"Fearless"	Eliminated
Daniel Stallworth	10	"Best Part"	Eliminated
Keyla Richardson	6	"Lover"	Safe
Keyla Richardson	14	"I'd Rather Go Blind"	Safe
Braden Rumfelt	7	"Cardigan"	Safe
Braden Rumfelt	11	"This Love"	Safe

Non-competition performance
Performer	Song
Luke Bryan	"Country and She Knows It"

=== Top 5 – Class of 2006 Reunion / American Idol X Dancing with the Stars (May 4) ===
Paula Abdul served as a guest judge this week, while Randy Jackson served as a guest mentor. In celebration of the twentieth anniversary of the fifth season of American Idol, each contestant performed a duet with a contestant from that season. They also performed with a professional dancer from Dancing with the Stars in a first-time crossover. Jan Ravnik, Gleb Savchenko, Rylee Arnold, and Witney Carson made appearances this week.

Top 5 (May 4)
Contestant	Order	Song	Result
Keyla Richardson	1	"River Deep – Mountain High"	Safe
Keyla Richardson	6	"Living for the City" (with Taylor Hicks)	Safe
Chris Tungseth	2	"Northern Attitude"	Eliminated
Chris Tungseth	7	"The Thunder Rolls" (with Bucky Covington)	Eliminated
Braden Rumfelt	3	"Lose Control"	Eliminated
Braden Rumfelt	8	"The Show Must Go On" (with Paris Bennett)	Eliminated
Hannah Harper	4	"Fever"	Safe
Hannah Harper	9	"A Broken Wing" (with Kellie Pickler)	Safe
Jordan McCullough	5	"Footprints in the Sand"	Safe
Jordan McCullough	10	"A Song for You" (with Elliott Yamin)	Safe

Non-competition performance
Performer	Song
Jamal Roberts	"Perfect for Me"

=== Top 3 – Finale (May 11) ===
Alicia Keys served as the guest mentor and performer for the finale. The first round of songs was a tribute to Alicia Keys, based on the songs of her own discography. The second round of songs were selected by the contestants as a tribute to their hometowns. After Richardson was eliminated in third place, the remaining two reprised their audition songs, after which Harper was announced as the winner.

Top 3 (May 11)
Contestant	Order	Song	Result
Hannah Harper	1	"No One"	Winner
Hannah Harper	4	"Married Into This Town" (original)	Winner
Hannah Harper	7	"String Cheese" (original)	Winner
Jordan McCullough	3	"If I Ain't Got You"	Runner-up
Jordan McCullough	6	"Dear God"	Runner-up
Jordan McCullough	8	"Goodness of God"	Runner-up
Keyla Richardson	2	"Un-Thinkable (I'm Ready)"	Third place
Keyla Richardson	5	"I Love The Lord"	Third place

Non-competition performances
Performer	Song
Top 3 with Alicia Keys	"Lovin' U"
Rae with En Vogue	"My Lovin' (You're Never Gonna Get It)" / "Free Your Mind"
Jake Thistle and Jesse Findling with Blues Traveler and Gin Blossoms	"Hey Jealousy" / "Hook"
Lucas Leon with Brad Paisley	"I'm Gonna Miss Her (The Fishin' Song)"
Chris Tungseth with Nelly	"Cruise"
Carrie Underwood with Mötley Crüe	"Home Sweet Home" / "Kickstart My Heart"
Brooks with Cameron Whitcomb	"Kingdom of Fear"
Philmon Lee with Shinedown	"Searchlight" / "Second Chance"
Alicia Keys and Raye	"Fallin'"
Luke Bryan	"Fish Hunt Golf Drink"
Julián Kalel with Luke Bryan	"A Thousand Miles from Nowhere"
Braden Rumfelt with Clay Aiken	"Rewind" / "Don't Let the Sun Go Down on Me"
Hannah Harper with Lee Ann Womack	"I Hope You Dance"
Daniel Stallworth and Jordan McCullough with Tori Kelly	"Control" / "Confetti"
Kyndal Inskeep and Lainey Grace	"Honest"
Keyla Richardson with Jason Mraz	"I Won't Give Up"
Lionel Richie, Carrie Underwood and Luke Bryan	"Deep River Woman"
Hannah Harper	"At the Cross (Love Ran Red)"

== Elimination chart ==
Color key:

Winner
Runner-up
Third place
Did not perform
Saved by the judges
Saved by the public
Eliminated

American Idol (season 24) - Eliminations
Contestant	Pl.	Top 20		Top 14	Top 12	Top 11	Top 9	Top 7	Top 5	Finale
Contestant	Pl.	3/16	3/23	3/30	4/6	4/13	4/20	4/27	5/4	5/11
Hannah Harper	1	Safe	N/A	Safe	Safe	Safe	Safe	Safe	Safe	Winner
Jordan McCullough	2	N/A	Safe	Safe	Safe	Safe	Safe	Safe	Safe	Runner-up
Keyla Richardson	3	N/A	Safe	Safe	Safe	Safe	Safe	Safe	Safe	Third place
Braden Rumfelt	4	Safe	N/A	Safe	Safe	Safe	Safe	Safe	Eliminated	
Chris Tungseth	4	N/A	Safe	Safe	Safe	Safe	Safe	Safe	Eliminated	
Brooks	6	Safe	N/A	Safe	Safe	Safe	Safe	Eliminated		
Daniel Stallworth	6	Safe	N/A	Safe	Safe	Safe	Safe	Eliminated		
Kyndal Inskeep	8	Safe	N/A	Safe	Safe	Safe	Eliminated			
Lucas Leon	8	N/A	Safe	Safe	Safe	Safe	Eliminated			
Philmon Lee	10	N/A	Safe	Safe	Safe	Eliminated				
Rae	10	N/A	Safe	Safe	Saved	Eliminated				
Jesse Findling	12	Safe	N/A	Safe	Eliminated					
Jake Thistle	13	Safe	N/A	Eliminated						
Julián Kalel	13	N/A	Safe	Eliminated						
Abayomi	15-20	N/A	Eliminated							
Madison Moon	15-20	N/A	Eliminated							
Ruby Rae	15-20	N/A	Eliminated							
Genevieve Hayward	15-20	Eliminated								
Kutter Bradley	15-20	Eliminated								
Makiyah	15-20	Eliminated								

== Podcast ==
An official American Idol podcast, hosted by Danielle Fishel, launched on April 1, 2026.

Podcast Episodes
Episode	Date	Guests
1	April 1	Jamal Roberts; Sasha Farber
Bonus	April 3	Genevieve Heyward and Kutter Bradley
2	April 8	Carrie Underwood, Luke Bryan, and Lionel Richie; Andrea Barber; Jesse Findling
3	April 15	Constantine Maroulis; The Miz; Megan Michaels Wolflick; Rae and Philmon Lee
4	April 22	Lance Bass; cast of Descendants: Wicked Wonderland (Alexandro Byrd, Kiara Romero, Liamani Segura, and Brendon Tremblay); David Archuleta; Kyndal and Lucas Leon
5	April 29	Lauren Spencer Smith; Jan Ravnik; Anthony Gargiula; Brooks Rosser and Daniel Stallworth
6	May 6	Dancing with the Stars pros (Rylee Arnold, Witney Carson, Jan Ravnik, and Gleb Savchenko); Paula Abdul; Kellie Pickler; Braden Rumfelt and Chris Tungseth
7	May 13	Clay Aiken; Jordan McCullough; Hannah Harper

== Voting information ==
Starting this season, the American Idol app, which was used for voting in recent seasons, was discontinued, and voting for this season occurred on the show's website and social media accounts as well as via text messages.

== Ratings ==
Ratings for Disney+ simulcasts are excluded.

Viewership and ratings per episode of American Idol season 24
No.	Title	Air date	Timeslot (ET)	Rating/share (18–49)	Viewers (millions)
1	"Auditions, Part 1"	January 26, 2026	Monday 8:00 p.m.	0.6	6.22
2	"Auditions, Part 2"	February 2, 2026	Monday 8:00 p.m.	0.6	5.47
3	"Auditions, Part 3"	February 9, 2026	Monday 8:00 p.m.	0.4	4.49
4	"Auditions, Part 4"	February 16, 2026	Monday 8:00 p.m.	0.4	4.75
5	"Hollywood Week In Music City - Part 1"	February 23, 2026	Monday 8:00 p.m.	0.5	5.52
6	"Hollywood Week In Music City - Part 2"	March 2, 2026	Monday 8:00 p.m.	0.4	5.19
7	"'Ohana Round"	March 9, 2026	Monday 8:00 p.m.	0.4	5.09
8	"Top 20 at Disney's Aulani Resort in Hawai'i - Part 1"	March 16, 2026	Monday 8:00 p.m.	0.4	4.70
9	"Top 20 at Disney's Aulani Resort in Hawai'i - Part 2"	March 23, 2026	Monday 8:00 p.m.	0.4	4.79
10	"Songs of Faith"	March 30, 2026	Monday 8:00 p.m.	0.4	4.86
11	"90s Judges' Song Contest"	April 6, 2026	Monday 8:00 p.m.	0.4	4.86
12	"Rock & Roll Hall of Fame"	April 13, 2026	Monday 8:00 p.m.	0.5	5.08
13	"Disney Night"	April 20, 2026	Monday 8:00 p.m.	0.4	5.07
14	"Celebrating Taylor Swift on American Idol"	April 27, 2026	Monday 8:00 p.m.	0.4	5.34
15	"Class of 2006: Reunion / Idol X DWTS"	May 4, 2026	Monday 8:00 p.m.	0.4	5.21
16	"Grand Finale"	May 11, 2026	Monday 8:00 p.m.	0.6	5.71
