= Ken Warwick =

British television director

Ken Warwick is a British television executive producer and director, most noted for producing the reality television series American Idol, and Pop Idol. Before being a producer he was a dancer/choreographer, previously being a member of BBC's The Young Generation. Warwick has received numerous awards for his television programs including Two Emmy's a BAFTA, the Golden Rose of Montreux, a National Television Award, and has been nominated for eight Emmys. Ken lives in Beverly Hills and London, and has three children, Joe, Gracie and Max, and a wife Julie. Ken has also directed and produced the popular TV show Gladiators which appeared on British primetime TV. He most recently produced the NBC show America's Got Talent.

In 2004, Ken purchased a vineyard on the Californian central coast. Producing Villa San Juliette fine wines and being considered one of the most aesthetically beautiful vineyards in the area, VSJ now produces approximately 7,000 cases per year.

In June 2013, it was confirmed that Warwick would not return to American Idol to executive produce the thirteenth season.

In June 2014, Warwick acted as the executive producer for the American version of Rising Star.
