= American Idol =

American singing competition

- Also known as: American Idol: The Search for a Superstar
- Genre: Reality competition
- Created by: Simon Fuller
- Based on: Pop Idol
- Directed by: Andy Scheer (2002); Bruce Gowers (2002–2010); Ken Warwick (2003–2013); Nigel Lythgoe (2003–2008, 2012); Paul Miller (2003); John Pritchett (2008); Bill DeRonde (2009, 2014–2016); Gregg Gelfand (2008, 2010–2013); Russell Norman (2013, 2015–2016, 2019); Louis J. Horvitz (2014); Glenn Weiss (2015); Phil Heyes (2015–2016, 2018–present, Bootcamp onwards); Ben Thursby-Palmer (2018, 2020–2025, Auditions only); Ryan Goble (2019); Sam Wrench (2020, 2025–present); Julia Knowles (2022)
- Presented by: Ryan Seacrest; Brian Dunkleman
- Judges: Paula Abdul; Simon Cowell; Randy Jackson; Kara DioGuardi; Ellen DeGeneres; Jennifer Lopez; Steven Tyler; Mariah Carey; Nicki Minaj; Keith Urban; Harry Connick Jr.; Luke Bryan; Katy Perry; Lionel Richie; Carrie Underwood
- Theme music composer: Julian Gingell; Barry Stone; Cathy Dennis
- Country of origin: United States
- Original language: English
- No. of seasons: 25
- No. of episodes: 734 (list of episodes)

Production
- Executive producers: Simon Fuller (2002–2016); Cecile Frot-Coutaz (2002–2018); Simon Jones (2002–2003); Nigel Lythgoe (2002–2008, 2011–2013, 2016 finale); Ken Warwick (2002–2013); J. Brian Gadinsky (2002); Charles Boyd (2009–2016); Trish Kinane (2013–2016, 2018–2022); Jesse Ignjatovic (2014); Evan Prager (2014); Per Blankens (2014–2015); David Hill (2015–2016); Megan Michaels Wolflick (2015–2016, 2018–present); Jessica Castro (2016); Jennifer Mullin (2018–present); Phil McIntyre (2018); Caroline Abaecheta (2018–2020); Daniel Martin (2018–2020); Chris Anokute (2019); Robert McLoed (2019, 2023); Eli Holzman (2020–present); Aaron Saidman (2020–present); Brian Burke (2021–present); Brian Updyke (2021–2022); Nikki Varhely Gillingham (2021); Theodore Dimitriou (2022–present); Matt Banks (2022–present); Mike Deffina (2023–present); Katie Fennelly Watkins (2024–present); Arinze Ikemefuna (2024–present)
- Running time: 22–104 minutes
- Production companies: Fremantle North America (Note: Credited as FremantleMedia North America from 2002–2018.); 19 Entertainment

Original release
- Network: Fox
- Release: June 11, 2002 – April 7, 2016
- Network: ABC
- Release: March 11, 2018 – present

American Idol is an American singing competition television series created by Simon Fuller, produced by Fremantle North America and 19 Entertainment, and distributed by Fremantle North America. It aired on Fox from June 11, 2002, to April 7, 2016, for 15 seasons. It was on hiatus until March 11, 2018, when a revival of the series began airing on ABC.

It started as an addition to the Idol format that was based on Pop Idol from British television, and it became one of the most successful shows in the history of American television. The concept of the series involves discovering recording stars from unsigned singing talents, with the winner determined by American viewers using phones, Internet platforms, and SMS text voting. The winners of the first twenty-four seasons, as chosen by viewers, are Kelly Clarkson, Ruben Studdard, Fantasia Barrino, Carrie Underwood, Taylor Hicks, Jordin Sparks, David Cook, Kris Allen, Lee DeWyze, Scotty McCreery, Phillip Phillips, Candice Glover, Caleb Johnson, Nick Fradiani, Trent Harmon, Maddie Poppe, Laine Hardy, Just Sam, Chayce Beckham, Noah Thompson, Iam Tongi, Abi Carter, Jamal Roberts, and Hannah Harper.

American Idol employs a select panel of judges who critique the contestants' performances. The original judges, for seasons one through eight, were record producer and music manager Randy Jackson, singer and choreographer Paula Abdul, and music executive and manager Simon Cowell. The judging panel for the last three seasons on Fox consisted of singers Keith Urban, Jennifer Lopez, and Harry Connick Jr. Season sixteen brought three new judges: singers Luke Bryan, Katy Perry, and Lionel Richie. Beginning in the twenty-third season, Underwood replaced Perry, alongside returning judges Bryan and Richie. The show has been hosted by television presenter Ryan Seacrest throughout its run, apart from the show's inaugural season when comedian Brian Dunkleman joined Seacrest as co-host.

The success of American Idol has been described as "unparalleled in broadcasting history". A rival TV executive said the series was "the most impactful show in the history of television". It became a recognized springboard for launching the career of many artists as bona fide stars. According to Billboard magazine, in its first ten years, "Idol has spawned 345 Billboard chart-toppers and a platoon of pop idols, including Kelly Clarkson, Carrie Underwood, Chris Daughtry, Fantasia, Ruben Studdard, Jennifer Hudson, Clay Aiken, Adam Lambert, and Jordin Sparks while remaining a TV ratings juggernaut." For an unprecedented eight consecutive years, from the 2003–04 television season through the 2010–11 season, either its performance show or result show was ranked number one in U.S. television ratings.

== History ==
Logo used for the original series

American Idol was based on the British show Pop Idol created by Simon Fuller, which was in turn inspired by the New Zealand television singing competition Popstars. Television producer Nigel Lythgoe saw a version in Australia and helped bring it over to Britain. Fuller was inspired by the idea from Popstars of employing a panel of judges to select singers in audition. He then added other elements, including telephone voting by the viewing public (which at the time was already in use in shows, such as the Eurovision Song Contest), the drama of backstories, and real-life soap opera unfolding in real time. Pop Idol debuted in Britain in 2001 with Lythgoe as showrunner‍—‌the executive producer and production leader‍—‌and Simon Cowell as one of the judges, and was successful with the viewing public.

In 2001, Fuller, Cowell, and TV producer Simon Jones attempted to sell the Pop Idol format to the United States, but the idea was initially met with poor responses from all the television networks including UPN and Fox. However, Rupert Murdoch, head of Fox's parent company, was later persuaded to buy the series by his daughter, Elisabeth, who had seen the British show. Although Fox's executives wanted to change the format, Murdoch insisted that it should remain the same as the British one. One change was nevertheless made due to the presence of multiple time zones in the United States that made it impractical for the country to vote in the same time period, an additional half-hour results show was therefore added the day following the performance show. The show was renamed American Idol: The Search for a Superstar and debuted in the summer of 2002. Cowell was initially offered the job of showrunner but turned down the offer; Lythgoe then took over that position. Much to the surprise of Cowell and Fox, it became one of the biggest shows of the summer. With its successful launch in the summer, the show was then moved to January and expanded. The show grew into a phenomenon largely due to its personal engagement with the contestants by prompting the viewers to vote, and the presence of the acid-tongued Cowell as a judge. By 2004, it had become the most-watched show on American television, a position it then held for seven consecutive seasons until 2011.

However, after a few years of sharp declining ratings starting in 2012, with rating falls of over 20% each season, the fifteenth season would be its last on Fox, ending its run in April 2016. In May 2017, ABC acquired the rights to the series and the program returned for the 2017–18 television season. The first season of the revived series, or the sixteenth season overall, started airing in March 2018. Eight seasons have been aired on ABC as of May 2025.

== Judges and hosts ==
Judges and host of the most recent season of American Idol

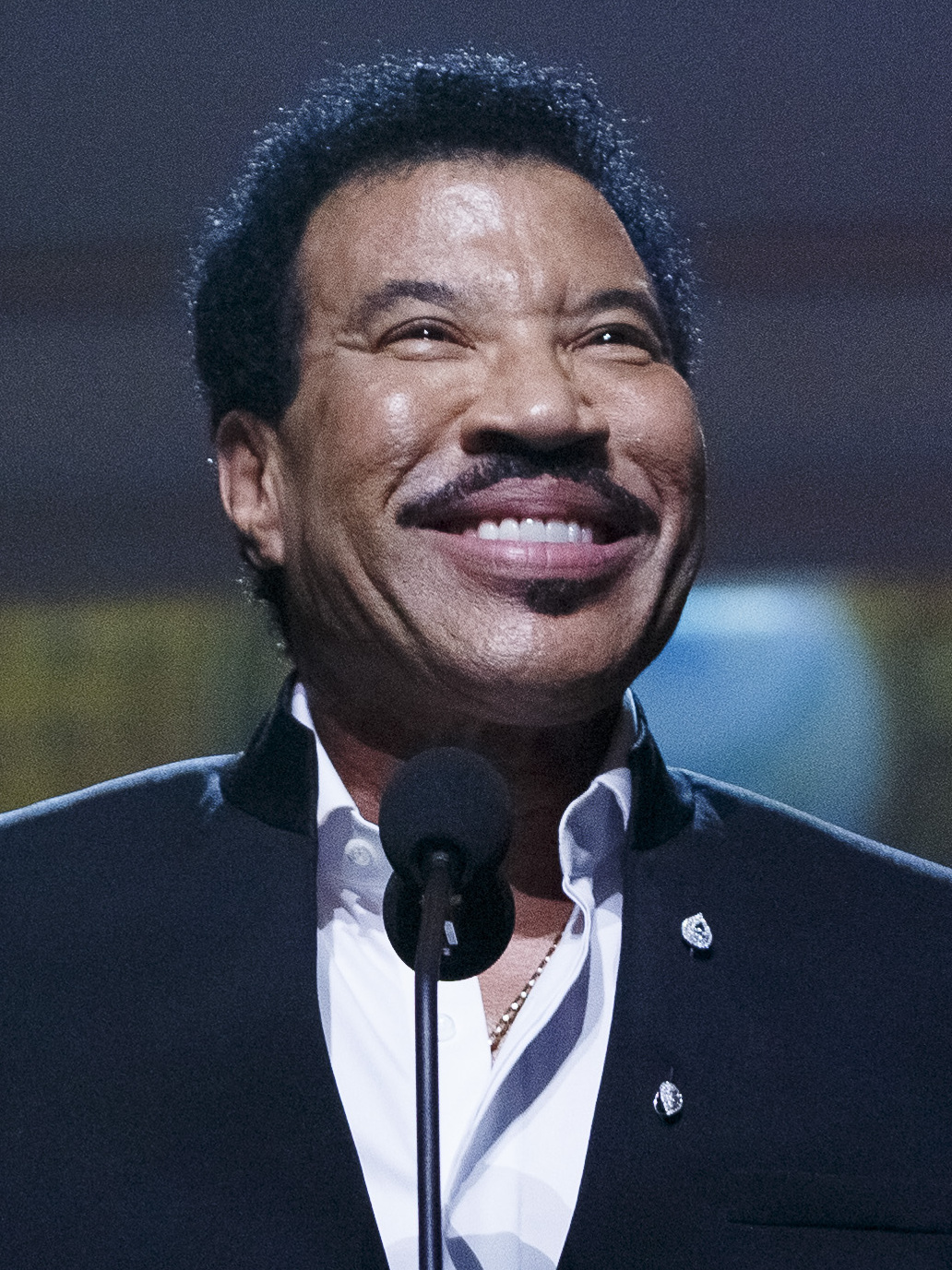
Lionel Richie

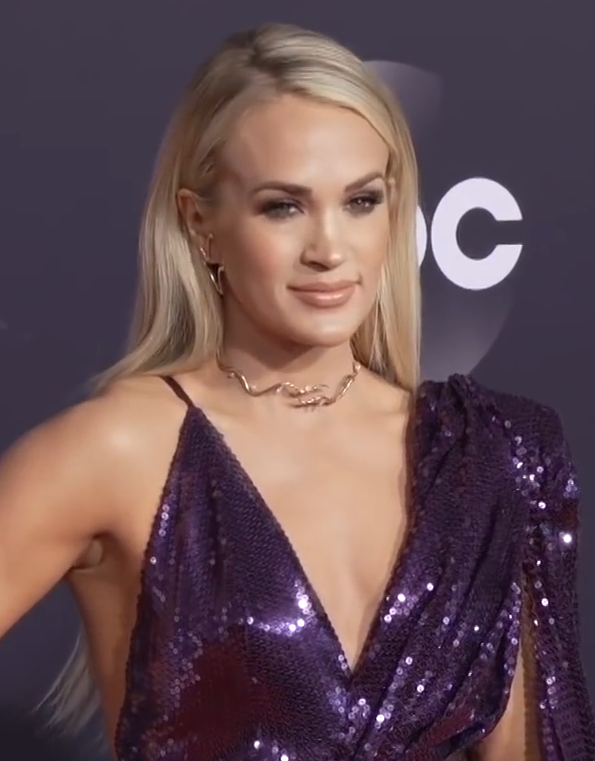
Carrie Underwood

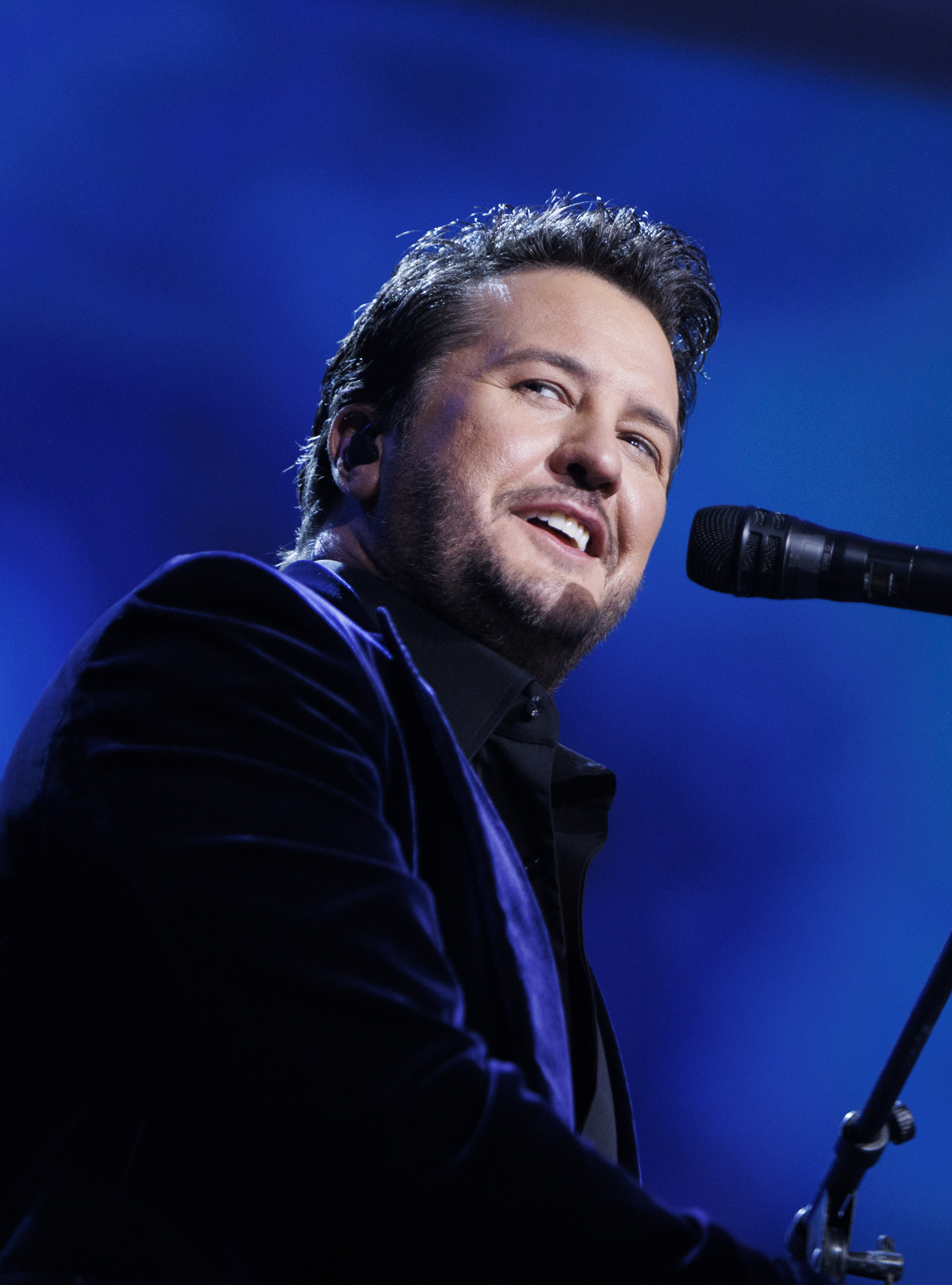
Luke Bryan

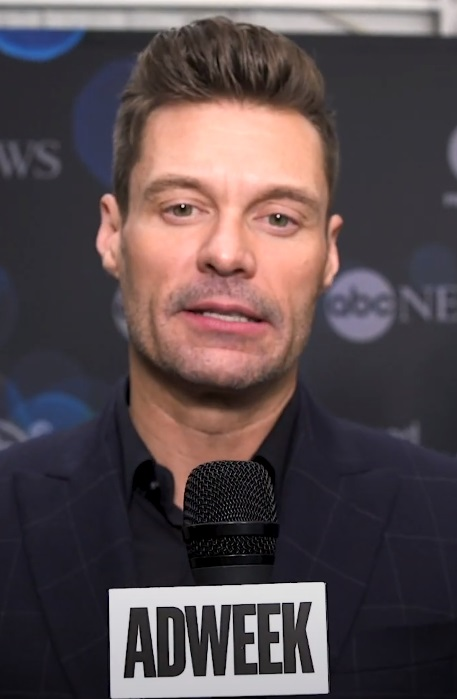
Ryan Seacrest (host)

=== Judges ===
The show had originally planned on having four judges following the Pop Idol format; however, only three judges had been found by the time of the audition round in the first season, namely Randy Jackson, Paula Abdul, and Simon Cowell. A fourth judge, radio DJ Stryker, was originally chosen but he dropped out citing "image concerns." In the second season, New York radio personality Angie Martinez had been hired as a fourth judge but withdrew after only a few days of auditions, due to being uncomfortable with giving out criticism. The show decided to continue with the three judges format until the eighth season. All three original judges stayed on the judging panel for eight seasons.

In the eighth season, Latin Grammy Award-nominated singer-songwriter and record producer Kara DioGuardi was added as a fourth judge. Abdul left the show in 2009, after the eighth season, as a result of failing to agree to terms with the show producers. Emmy Award-winning talk show host Ellen DeGeneres replaced Abdul for the ninth season, but left in 2010 after just one season. DioGuardi was let go from American Idol in 2010 after two seasons, as producers favored a return to the three-person judges panel previously used prior to DioGuardi's appearance on the show. Cowell also left the show in 2010 to introduce the American version of his show The X Factor in 2011. Jackson was the only judge from the ninth season to return for the tenth.

Jennifer Lopez and Steven Tyler joined the judging panel in the tenth season, but both left in 2012 after two seasons. Jackson was the only judge from the eleventh season to return for the twelfth. They were replaced by three new judges, Mariah Carey, Nicki Minaj, and Keith Urban, who joined Jackson in the twelfth season. However, both Carey and Minaj left after one season. Jackson also departed the judges table after twelve seasons, but would return as the in-house mentor for the thirteenth season in 2014, after which he left the show permanently.

Urban was the only judge from the twelfth season to return as a judge for the thirteenth season. After a one-season hiatus, Lopez returned to American Idol for the thirteenth season, and was joined by former mentor Harry Connick Jr. After this, Lopez, Urban, and Connick Jr. remained on the show until its cancellation after the fifteenth season in 2016.

When the show was revived by ABC in 2018, Katy Perry, Luke Bryan, and Lionel Richie were selected as judges, marking the sixteenth season of Idol. Bryan and Richie have remained on the show since, while Perry left the show in May 2024 after seven seasons. On July 31, 2024, published reports announced former Idol winner Carrie Underwood as Perry's replacement, joining Bryan and Richie for the twenty-third season. In August 2025, it was announced Bryan, Richie, and Underwood would return as judges for the twenty-fourth season.

Guest judges may occasionally be introduced. In the second season, guest judges such as Richie and Gladys Knight were used, and in the third season, Donna Summer, Quentin Tarantino, Gloria Estefan, and some of the mentors also joined as judges to critique the performances in the final rounds. Guest judges were sporadically used during the audition rounds: Gene Simmons, LL Cool J, Brandy, Mark McGrath, and Kenny Loggins in the fourth season; Carole Bayer Sager, Jewel, and Olivia Newton-John in the sixth season; Shania Twain, Neil Patrick Harris, Avril Lavigne, Mary J. Blige, Joe Jonas, Kristin Chenoweth, Victoria Beckham, and Perry in the ninth season (substituting in the vacant chair, before DeGeneres was hired); and Adam Lambert filled in for Urban at one audition location during the fourteenth season. In the ABC version, two instances occurred during the live shows: Abdul filled in for Bryan on one episode of the nineteenth season, while Alanis Morissette and Ed Sheeran filled in for Perry and Richie on an episode of the twenty-first season.

=== Hosts ===
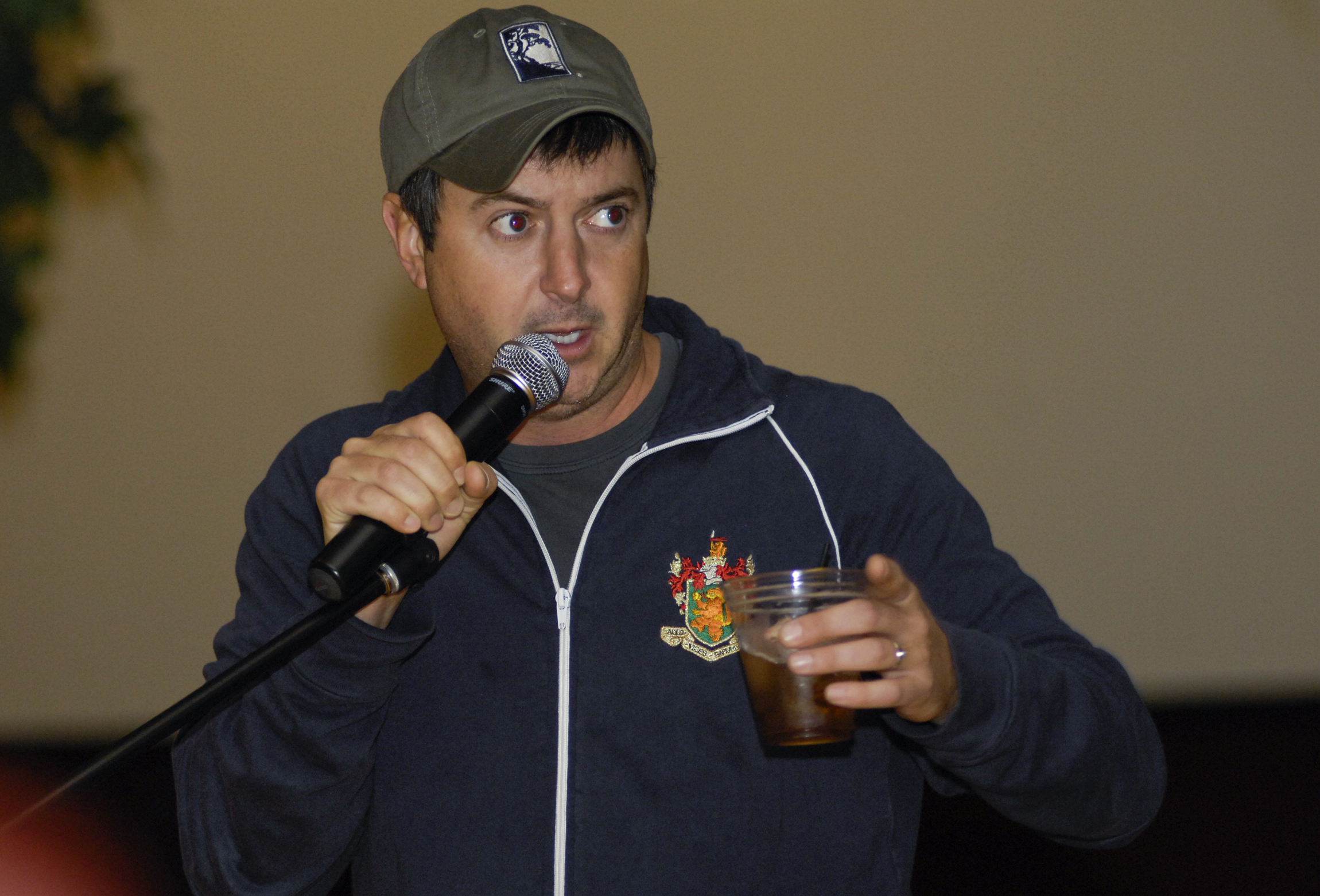
Brian Dunkleman co-hosted with Seacrest for the first season.

The first season was co-hosted by Ryan Seacrest and Brian Dunkleman, following the format of Pop Idol of using two presenters. Dunkleman quit thereafter, resulting in Seacrest becoming the sole emcee starting with the second season in 2003.

Seacrest has remained as sole host of American Idol ever since, with the exception of the two-year hiatus between 2016 and 2018 as well as April 8, 2019, during the seventeenth season, when Bobby Bones subbed for Seacrest after the latter fell ill. Dunkleman did, however, return for the initial series finale on Fox in 2016 as a guest.

=== Cast timeline ===
Color key

Host
Guest Host
Judge
Guest Judge
Contestant
In-House Mentor
Guest Mentor
Musical Director
Vocal Coach

Cast Member	Seasons																								
Cast Member	1	2	3	4	5	6	7	8	9	10	11	12	13	14	15	16	17	18	19	20	21	22	23	24	25
Ryan Seacrest	●	●	●	●	●	●	●	●	●	●	●	●	●	●	●	●	●^{1}	●	●	●	●	●	●	●	●
Brian Dunkleman	●																								
Paula Abdul	●	●	●	●	●	●	●	●											●					●	
Simon Cowell	●	●	●	●	●	●	●	●	●																
Randy Jackson	●	●	●	●	●	●	●	●	●	●	●	●	●											●	
Kara DioGuardi								●	●																
Ellen DeGeneres									●																
Jennifer Lopez						●				●	●		●	●	●										
Steven Tyler										●	●														
Mariah Carey							●					●													
Nicki Minaj												●													
Keith Urban												●	●	●	●						●				
Harry Connick Jr.									●			●	●	●	●										
Luke Bryan																●	●	●	●	●	●	●	●	●	●
Katy Perry									●							●	●	●	●	●	●	●			
Lionel Richie		●														●	●	●	●	●	●	●	●	●	●
Carrie Underwood				●												●				●			●	●	●
Kelly Clarkson	●													●	●										
Clay Aiken		●		●		●									●						●				
Adam Lambert								●	●					●^{2}			●				●				
Jimmy Iovine										●	●	●													
Scott Borchetta														●	●										
Bobby Bones																●	●	●	●						
Rickey Minor				●	●	●	●	●	●				●	●	●										
Ray Chew										●	●	●													
Kris Pooley																●	●	●	●	●	●	●	●	●	●
Debra Byrd	●	●	●	●	●	●	●	●	●	●															
Peggi Blu										●	●														

Annotations

- ^{1} Bones substituted for Seacrest on the second "Top 20 Duets" episode of Season 17, in addition to being In-House Mentor the entire season.
- ^{2} Lambert substituted for Urban at one Season 14 audition location (New York City), due to the latter's family emergency.

== Selection process ==
In a series of steps, the show selected the eventual winner out of many tens of thousands of contestants.

=== Contestant eligibility ===
The eligible age-range for contestants is fifteen to twenty-eight years old. The initial age limit was sixteen to twenty-four in the first three seasons, but the upper limit was raised to twenty-eight in the fourth season, and the lower limit was reduced to fifteen in the tenth season. The contestants have to be legal U.S. residents, can not have advanced to particular stages of the competition in previous seasons, and must not have held a current recording or talent representation contract by the semi-final stage (in previous years by the audition stage).

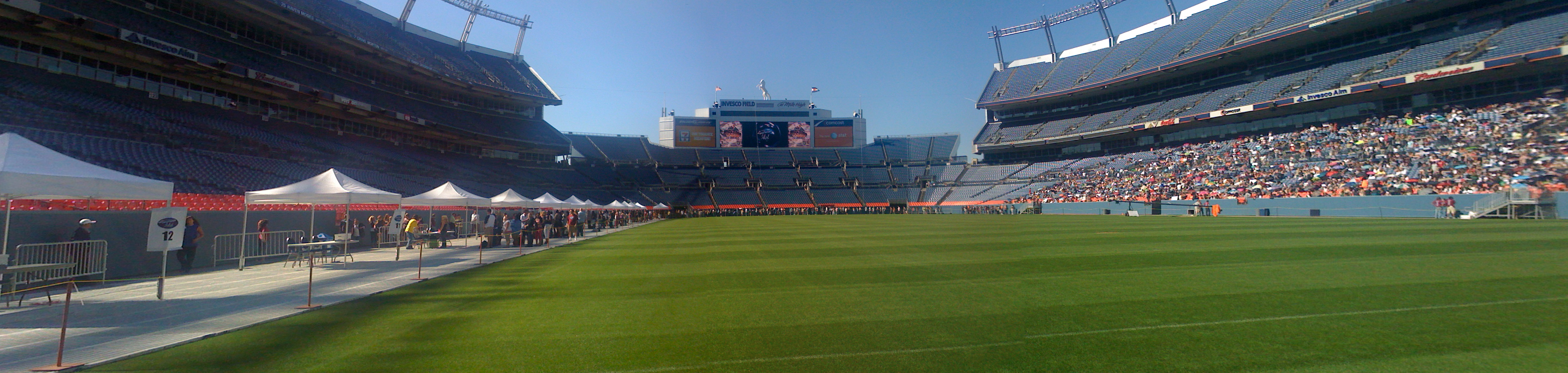
Season nine's Denver audition, at Invesco Field at Mile High.

=== Initial auditions ===
For the first eighteen seasons, contestants went through at least three sets of cuts. The first was a brief audition with a few other contestants in front of selectors which may include one of the show's producers. Although auditions can exceed 10,000 in each city, only a few hundred of these made it past the preliminary round of auditions. Successful contestants then sing in front of producers, where more may be cut. Only then can they proceed to audition in front of the judges, which is the only audition stage shown on television. Those selected by the judges are sent to Hollywood. Between 10 and 60 people in each city may make it to Hollywood (the average total is between 150 and 200).

From the nineteenth season onwards, contestants request a Zoom interview and audition remotely for the show's producers. If the audition goes well, they will then invite the contestants to audition in front of the judges, in one of the audition cities.

=== Hollywood week ===
Once in Hollywood, the contestants perform individually or in groups in a series of rounds. Until the tenth season, there were usually three rounds of eliminations in Hollywood. In the first round the contestants emerged in groups but performed individually. For the next round, the contestants put themselves in small groups and performed a song together. In the final round, the contestants performed solo with a song of their choice a cappella or accompanied by a band‍—‌depending on the season. In the second and third seasons, contestants were also asked to write original lyrics or melody in an additional round after the first round. In the seventh season, the group round was eliminated and contestants may, after a first solo performance and on judges approval, skip a second solo round and move directly to the final Hollywood round. In the twelfth season, the executive producers split up the females and males and chose the members to form the groups in the group round. The show eliminated Hollywood Week in the twenty fifth season.

In the tenth and eleventh seasons, a further round was added in Las Vegas, where the contestants performed in groups based on a theme, followed by one final solo round to determine the semi-finalists. At the end of this stage of the competition, 24 to 36 contestants were selected to move on to the semi-final stage. In the twelfth season the Las Vegas round became a Sudden Death round, where the judges had to choose five guys and five girls each night (four nights) to make the top twenty. In the thirteenth season, the Las Vegas round was eliminated and a new round called "Hollywood or Home" was added, where if the judges were uncertain about some contestants, those contestants were required to perform soon after landing in Los Angeles, and those who failed to impress were sent back home before they reached Hollywood. In the fourteenth season, the "Hollywood or Home" round was dropped, and a Showcase round was added, where the contestants performed at the House of Blues or auditorium for the judges and a live audience, and these performances determine who makes into the Top 24. In the seventeenth and eighteenth seasons, the showcase round took place in Hawaii. From the nineteenth season onward, a showstopper round was used.

=== Audience voting ===
From the semi-finals onward, the fate of the contestants is decided by public vote. During the contestant's performance as well as the recap at the end, a toll-free telephone number for each contestant was displayed on the screen. For a two-hour period after the episode ends (up to four hours for the finale) in each US time zone, viewers may call or send a text message to their preferred contestant's telephone number, and each call or text message was registered as a vote for that contestant. Viewers were allowed to vote as many times as they can within the two-hour voting window. However, the show reserves the right to discard votes by power dialers. One or more of the least popular contestants may be eliminated in successive weeks until a winner emerges. Over 110 million votes were cast in the first season, and by the tenth season the seasonal total had increased to nearly 750 million. Voting via text messaging was made available in the second season when AT&T Wireless joined as a sponsor of the show, and 7.5 million text messages were sent to American Idol that season. The number of text messages rapidly increased, reaching 178 million texts by the eighth season. Online voting was offered for the first time in the tenth season. The votes are counted and verified by Telescope Inc.

=== Semi-finals ===
In the first three seasons, the semi-finalists were split into different groups to perform individually in their respective night. In the first season, there were three groups of ten, with the top three contestants from each group making the finals. In the second and third seasons, there were four groups of eight, and the top two of each selected. These seasons also featured a wildcard round, where contestants who failed to qualify were given another chance. In the first season, only one wildcard contestant was chosen by the judges, giving a total of ten finalists. In the second and third seasons, each of the three judges championed one contestant with the public advancing a fourth into the finals, making 12 finalists in all.

From the fourth through seventh and ninth seasons, the twenty-four semi-finalists were divided by gender in order to ensure an equal gender division in the top twelve. The men and women sang separately on consecutive nights, and the bottom two in each groups were eliminated each week until only six of each remained to form the top twelve.

The wildcard round returned in the eighth season, wherein there were three groups of twelve, with three contestants moving forward – the highest male, the highest female, and the next highest-placed singer – for each night, and four wildcards were chosen by the judges to produce a final 13. Starting in tenth season, the girls and boys perform on separate nights. In the tenth and eleventh seasons, five of each gender were chosen, and three wildcards were chosen by the judges to form a final 13. In the twelfth season, the top twenty semifinalists were split into gender groups, with five of each gender advancing to form the final 10. In the thirteenth season, there were thirty semifinalists, but only twenty semifinalists (ten for each gender) were chosen by the judges to perform on the live shows, with five in each gender based on the vote and three wildcards chosen by the judges composing the final 13. In the fourteenth season, the top 24 performed at The Fillmore Detroit, starting with the 12 males on one night and then the 12 females on the next night. The following week, the same order went for the top 16, with four males eliminated, followed by four females based on the vote. Then, on the first night of finals, a similar sequence from the thirteenth season was used to determine the final 12, with five of each gender based on the vote and two wildcards chosen by the judges. In the fifteenth season, the top 24 performed at Cathedral of Saint Vibiana in Los Angeles and were split into two groups of twelve and performed twice, one being a solo performance and one being a duet with a former Idol contestant. In each group, the judges chose 7 contestants to advance to the top 14 where the judges chose 4 to advance to the top 10 and remaining 6 contestants were chosen based on the vote. In the sixteenth season, the top 24 performed at the Academy in the Heart of LA, and the show repeated the process from the previous season. However, instead of Idol alumnus as duet partners, superstar celebrity singers were used as the duet partners. In the seventeenth season, the same process was repeated again. However, instead of a top 24, it's a top 20, the contestants performed at the Wiltern Theatre in Los Angeles, and performed solos in one episode, and performed the duets in two episodes. In the eighteenth season, due to the COVID-19 pandemic, the top 20 performed at their homes, and based on the vote, half of the top 20 would advance to the top 10, and the other half would be eliminated. However, a wild card was given to one of the bottom 10 to save them from elimination. In the nineteenth season, the show used a combination of the process from the sixteenth and fourteenth seasons. In the twentieth season, the show repeated the process from the previous season, but they used a top 20 instead of a top 16, and there were no all star duets. In the twenty-first season, the same process was repeated, but they started with a top 26 instead of a top 24. In the twenty-second season, the show repeated the process from the twentieth season.

=== Finals ===
The finals are broadcast in primetime, in front of a live studio audience (except the eighteenth season, due to the COVID-19 pandemic). From 2002 to 2016, 2018 to 2019 and 2021 to 2022, Stage 36 at the CBS Television City hosted the finals. From 2023 to 2026, Stage 1 at Red Studios Hollywood hosted the finals. Starting in 2027, the show will move production to Trilith Live in the Atlanta, GA area.

The finals lasted between six and thirteen weeks. Each finalist performs songs based on a weekly theme which may be a musical genre such as Motown, disco, or big band, songs by artists such as Michael Jackson, Elvis Presley or The Beatles, or more general themes such as Billboard number-one hits or songs from the contestant's year of birth. Contestants usually worked with a celebrity mentor related to the theme. From the tenth to twelfth seasons, Jimmy Iovine was brought in as a mentor for the season. Initially the contestants sang one song each week, but this was increased to two songs from top four or five onwards, then three songs for the top two or three.

The most popular contestants are usually not revealed in the results show. Instead, typically the three contestants (two in later rounds) who received the lowest number of votes was called to the center of the stage. One of these three was usually sent to safety; however the two remaining were not necessarily the bottom two. The contestant with the fewest votes was then revealed and eliminated from the competition. A montage of the eliminated contestant's time on the show was played and they gave their final performance (from the fourteenth season onward, the montage and the final performance were dropped). However, in the sixth season, during the series' first ever Idol Gives Back episode, no contestant was eliminated, but on the following week, two were sent home. Moreover, from the eighth to the fourteenth seasons, and the seventeenth season onward, the judges may overturn viewers' decision with a "Judges' Save" if they unanimously agreed to. "The save" could only be used once, and only up through the Top 5. In the eighth to tenth and fourteenth seasons, a double elimination then took place in the week following the activation of the save, but in the eleventh and thirteenth seasons, a regular single elimination took place. The save was not activated in the twelfth season and consequently, a non-elimination took place in the week after its expiration with the votes then carrying over into the following week.

The "Fan Save" was introduced in the fourteenth season. During the finals, viewers were given a five-minute window to vote for the contestants in danger of elimination by using their Twitter account to decide which contestant will move on to the next show, starting with the Top 8.

=== Season finale ===
During the original run of American Idol on Fox, the finale week consisted of a one-hour long final performance night and a two-hour last episode of the season that culminates in revealing the winner, both of which are broadcast live in the U.S. Eastern and Central time zones. For the first, third through sixth and fourteenth through fifteenth seasons it was broadcast from the Dolby Theatre, which has an audience capacity of approximately 3,400. The second-season finale took place at the Gibson Amphitheatre, which had an audience capacity of over 6,000. In the seventh through thirteenth seasons, the venue was at the Nokia Theatre L.A. Live, which holds an audience of over 7,000. Since the show's reboot on ABC, the venue remains the same throughout the entire show (excluding auditions), but was still two episodes in the sixteenth season, and then stretched to a single three-hour season finale that is annually aired live simultaneously in all U.S. territories, starting with the seventeenth season. The eighteenth-season finale was conducted virtually due to the COVID-19 pandemic.

=== Rewards for winner and finalists ===
The winner usually receives a record deal with a major label, which may be for up to six albums, and secures a management contract with American Idol-affiliated 19 Management (which has the right of first refusal to sign all contestants), as well as various lucrative contracts. All winners prior to the ninth season reportedly earned at least $1 million in their first year as winner. At first the contract came with a $250,000-plus advance, but dropped to about $62,500 over the Fox years. All the runners-up of the first ten seasons, as well as some of other finalists, had also received record deals with major labels. However, starting in the eleventh season, the runner-up may only be guaranteed a single-only deal. BMG/Sony (first through ninth seasons), UMG (tenth through fifteenth seasons), and Disney Music Group's Hollywood Records (sixteenth through eighteenth seasons) had the right of first refusal to sign contestants for three months after the season's finale. In the fourteenth and fifteenth seasons, the winner was signed with Big Machine Records. Prominent music mogul Clive Davis also produced some of the selected contestants' albums, such as Kelly Clarkson, Clay Aiken, Fantasia Barrino and Diana DeGarmo. All top 10 (11 in the tenth and twelfth seasons, 5 in the fourteenth season, and 7 in the sixteenth season) finalists earn the privilege of going on a tour, where the participants may each earn a six-figure sum.

== Series overview ==
Season	Episodes	Originally released			Winner	Runner-up
Season	Episodes	First released	Last released	Network	Winner	Runner-up
1	25	June 11, 2002	September 4, 2002	Fox	Kelly Clarkson	Justin Guarini
2	40	January 21, 2003	May 21, 2003	Fox	Ruben Studdard	Clay Aiken
3	44	January 19, 2004	May 26, 2004	Fox	Fantasia Barrino	Diana DeGarmo
4	43	January 18, 2005	May 25, 2005	Fox	Carrie Underwood	Bo Bice
5	41	January 17, 2006	May 24, 2006	Fox	Taylor Hicks	Katharine McPhee
6	41	January 16, 2007	May 23, 2007	Fox	Jordin Sparks	Blake Lewis
7	42	January 15, 2008	May 21, 2008	Fox	David Cook	David Archuleta
8	40	January 13, 2009	May 20, 2009	Fox	Kris Allen	Adam Lambert
9	43	January 12, 2010	May 26, 2010	Fox	Lee DeWyze	Crystal Bowersox
10	39	January 19, 2011	May 25, 2011	Fox	Scotty McCreery	Lauren Alaina
11	40	January 18, 2012	May 23, 2012	Fox	Phillip Phillips	Jessica Sanchez
12	37	January 16, 2013	May 16, 2013	Fox	Candice Glover	Kree Harrison
13	39	January 15, 2014	May 21, 2014	Fox	Caleb Johnson	Jena Irene
14	30	January 7, 2015	May 13, 2015	Fox	Nick Fradiani	Clark Beckham
15	24	January 6, 2016	April 7, 2016	Fox	Trent Harmon	La'Porsha Renae
16	19	March 11, 2018	May 21, 2018	ABC	Maddie Poppe	Caleb Lee Hutchinson
17	19	March 3, 2019	May 19, 2019	ABC	Laine Hardy	Alejandro Aranda
18	16	February 16, 2020	May 17, 2020	ABC	Just Sam	Arthur Gunn
19	19	February 14, 2021	May 23, 2021	ABC	Chayce Beckham	Willie Spence
20	20	February 27, 2022	May 22, 2022	ABC	Noah Thompson	HunterGirl
21	20	February 19, 2023	May 21, 2023	ABC	Iam Tongi	Megan Danielle
22	18	February 18, 2024	May 19, 2024	ABC	Abi Carter	Will Moseley
23	19	March 2, 2025	May 18, 2025	ABC	Jamal Roberts	John Foster
24	16	January 26, 2026	May 11, 2026	ABC	Hannah Harper	Jordan McCullough
25	13	February 8, 2027	May 3, 2027	ABC	TBA	TBA

== Season synopses ==
Each season premieres with the audition round, which take place in different cities across the United States. The audition episodes typically feature a mix of potential finalists, interesting characters and woefully inadequate contestants. Each successful contestant receives a golden or platinum ticket to proceed on to the next round in Hollywood. Based on their performances during the Hollywood round (Las Vegas round from 2011 to 2013), 24 to 36 contestants are selected by the judges to participate in the semifinals. From the semifinals onward, the contestants perform their songs live, with the judges making their critiques after each performance. The contestants are voted for by the viewing public, and the outcome of the public votes is then revealed during a results segment. The results segment feature group performances by the contestants as well as guest performers. The Top 3 results also features homecoming events for the Top 3 finalists. The season reaches its climax in a two-hour results finale show, where the winner of the season is revealed.

With the exception of the first two seasons, the contestants in the semifinals onward perform in front of a studio audience. They perform with a full band in the finals. The current musical director is Kris Pooley, who has been with the show since the ABC revival began in 2018. In previous seasons, the Idol band was led by Rickey Minor, who initially served from 2005 to 2010; Minor left the show in 2010 to become musical director for The Tonight Show with Jay Leno. Minor was replaced by Ray Chew, who served from 2011 to 2013. Chew left the show in late 2013 to become musical director for Dancing with the Stars, where he has remained ever since. In February 2014, The Tonight Show with Jay Leno ended, and Minor returned to American Idol where he again served as musical director. Minor remained on the show until the original version ended in April 2016. Assistance has also been given by vocal coaches and song arrangers, such as Michael Orland and Debra Byrd to contestants behind the scene.

Starting with the seventh season in 2008, contestants may perform with a musical instrument from the Hollywood rounds onward. In later seasons, the contestants were allowed to perform with a musical instrument in the auditions. From the shows' inception in 2002 until 2010, performance shows were usually aired live on Tuesday nights, followed by the results shows on Wednesday night. In 2011, however, the performance shows were moved to Wednesday nights and the results shows on Thursday nights, which remained until the fourteenth season began in 2015 (with the exception of the finales of season ten, eleven and thirteen, where the performance shows and results shows reverted to Tuesday nights and Wednesday nights, respectively).

In 2015, starting with the fourteenth season, the show discontinued separate results shows, with both performance and result shows airing on the same night. This rule has been in place ever since. On the fourteenth season, the show aired on Wednesday nights, and on the fifteenth season, the show aired on Thursday nights. Since the ABC revival began in 2018, the show has been airing on Sunday nights and Monday nights, though both nights contain performances and do not feature separate results shows.

== Reception ==
=== U.S. television ratings ===
Seasonal rankings (based on average total viewers per episode) of American Idol. It holds the distinction of having the longest winning streak in the Nielsen annual television ratings; it became the highest-rated of all television programs in the United States overall for an unprecedented seven consecutive years, or eight consecutive (and total) years when either its performance or result show was ranked number one overall.

Each U.S. network television season starts in late September and ends in late May, which coincides with the completion of May sweeps.

Network	Season	Premiered		Ended		TV season	Timeslot (ET)	Season viewers	Season ranking
Network	Season	Date	Viewers (in millions)	Date	Viewers (in millions)	TV season	Timeslot (ET)	Season viewers	Season ranking
Fox	1	June 11, 2002	9.85	Final Performances: September 3, 2002	18.69	2001–02	Tuesday 9:00 pm (performance)	12.22	N/A
Fox	1	June 11, 2002	9.85	Season Finale: September 4, 2002	23.02	2001–02	Wednesday 9:30 pm (results)	11.62	N/A
Fox	2	January 21, 2003	26.50	Final Performances: May 20, 2003	25.67	2002–03	Tuesday 8:00 pm (performance)	21.03	4
Fox	2	January 21, 2003	26.50	Season Finale: May 21, 2003	38.06	2002–03	Wednesday 8:30 pm (results)	19.63	7
Fox	3	January 19, 2004	28.96	Final Performances: May 25, 2004	25.13	2003–04	Tuesday 8:00 pm (performance)	25.73	1
Fox	3	January 19, 2004	28.96	Season Finale: May 26, 2004	28.84	2003–04	Wednesday 8:30 pm (results)	24.31	3
Fox	4	January 18, 2005	33.58	Final Performances: May 24, 2005	28.05	2004–05	Tuesday 8:00 pm (performance)	27.32	1
Fox	4	January 18, 2005	33.58	Season Finale: May 25, 2005	30.27	2004–05	Wednesday 8:00 pm (results)	26.07	3
Fox	5	January 17, 2006	35.53	Final Performances: May 23, 2006	31.78	2005–06	Tuesday 8:00 pm (performance)	31.17	1
Fox	5	January 17, 2006	35.53	Season Finale: May 24, 2006	36.38	2005–06	Wednesday 8:00 pm (results)	30.16	2
Fox	6	January 16, 2007	37.44	Final Performances: May 22, 2007	25.33	2006–07	Tuesday 8:00 pm (performance)	30.11	2
Fox	6	January 16, 2007	37.44	Season Finale: May 23, 2007	30.76	2006–07	Wednesday 8:00 pm (results)	30.58	1
Fox	7	January 15, 2008	33.48	Final Performances: May 20, 2008	27.06	2007–08	Tuesday 8:00 pm (performance)	28.80	1
Fox	7	January 15, 2008	33.48	Season Finale: May 21, 2008	31.66	2007–08	Wednesday 8:00 pm (results)	27.81	2
Fox	8	January 13, 2009	30.45	Final Performances: May 19, 2009	23.82	2008–09	Tuesday 8:00 pm (performance)	26.25	2
Fox	8	January 13, 2009	30.45	Season Finale: May 20, 2009	28.84	2008–09	Wednesday 8:00 pm (results)	26.77	1
Fox	9	January 12, 2010	29.95	Final Performances: May 25, 2010	20.07	2009–10	Tuesday 8:00 pm (performance)	22.97	1
Fox	9	January 12, 2010	29.95	Season Finale: May 26, 2010	24.22	2009–10	Wednesday 8:00 pm (results)	21.95	2
Fox	10	January 19, 2011	26.23	Final Performances: May 24, 2011 (Tues)	20.57	2010–11	Wednesday 8:00 pm (performance)	25.97	1
Fox	10	January 19, 2011	26.23	Season Finale: May 25, 2011 (Wed)	29.29	2010–11	Thursday 8:00 pm (results)	23.87	2
Fox	11	January 18, 2012	21.93	Final Performances: May 22, 2012 (Tues)	14.85	2011–12	Wednesday 8:00 pm (performance)	19.81	2
Fox	11	January 18, 2012	21.93	Season Finale: May 23, 2012 (Wed)	21.49	2011–12	Thursday 8:00 pm (results)	18.33	4
Fox	12	January 16, 2013	17.93	Final Performances: May 15, 2013	12.11	2012–13	Wednesday 8:00 pm (performance)	15.04	7
Fox	12	January 16, 2013	17.93	Season Finale: May 16, 2013	14.31	2012–13	Thursday 8:00 pm (results)	14.65	9
Fox	13	January 15, 2014	15.19	Final Performances: May 20, 2014 (Tues)	6.76	2013–14	Wednesday 8:00 pm (performance)	11.94	17
Fox	13	January 15, 2014	15.19	Season Finale: May 21, 2014 (Wed)	10.53	2013–14	Thursday 8:00 pm (results)	11.43	22
Fox	14	January 7, 2015	11.20	Final Performances: May 12, 2015 (Tues)	5.55	2014–15	Wednesday 8:00 pm	10.31	41
Fox	14	January 7, 2015	11.20	Season Finale: May 13, 2015 (Wed)	8.03	2014–15	Thursday 8:00 pm (until March 12)	11.55	28
Fox	15	January 6, 2016	10.96	Final Performances: April 6, 2016	9.70	2015–16	Wednesday 8:00 pm (until February 24)	11.52	19
Fox	15	January 6, 2016	10.96	Season Finale: April 7, 2016	13.30	2015–16	Thursday 8:00 pm	11.13	23
ABC	16	March 11, 2018	10.48	Final Performances: May 20, 2018	7.47	2017–18	Sunday 8:00 pm	9.57	31
ABC	16	March 11, 2018	10.48	Season Finale: May 21, 2018	8.63	2017–18	Monday 8:00 pm (until April 23)	9.51	32
ABC	17	March 3, 2019	8.65	Final Performances/Season Finale: May 19, 2019	8.74	2018–19	Sunday 8:00 pm	9.10	32
ABC	17	March 3, 2019	8.65	Final Performances/Season Finale: May 19, 2019	8.74	2018–19	Monday 8:00 pm (until April 22)	8.00	42
ABC	18	February 16, 2020	8.07	Final Performances/Season Finale: May 17, 2020	7.28	2019–20	Sunday 8:00 pm	8.34	32
ABC	18	February 16, 2020	8.07	Final Performances/Season Finale: May 17, 2020	7.28	2019–20	Monday 8:00 pm (until March 23)	8.54	30
ABC	19	February 14, 2021	6.95	Final Performances/Season Finale: May 23, 2021	6.50	2020–21	Sunday 8:00 pm	7.42	25
ABC	19	February 14, 2021	6.95	Final Performances/Season Finale: May 23, 2021	6.50	2020–21	Monday 8:00 pm (until April 19)	6.24	39
ABC	20	February 27, 2022	6.30	Final Performances/Season Finale: May 22, 2022	6.49	2021–22	Sunday 8:00 pm	7.29	25
ABC	20	February 27, 2022	6.30	Final Performances/Season Finale: May 22, 2022	6.49	2021–22	Monday 8:00 pm (until May 2)	6.99	28
ABC	21	February 19, 2023	5.27	Final Performances/Season Finale: May 21, 2023	6.62	2022–23	Sunday 8:00 pm	6.92	20
ABC	21	February 19, 2023	5.27	Final Performances/Season Finale: May 21, 2023	6.62	2022–23	Monday 8:00 pm	6.06	32
ABC	22	February 18, 2024	4.62	Final Performances/Season Finale: May 19, 2024	5.64	2023–24	Sunday 8:00 pm	5.83	35
ABC	22	February 18, 2024	4.62	Final Performances/Season Finale: May 19, 2024	5.64	2023–24	Monday 8:00 pm (until April 29)	5.28	39
ABC	23	March 2, 2025	5.91	Final Performances/Season Finale: May 18, 2025	6.51	2024–25	Sunday 8:00 pm	7.3	67 (Note: 35-day multiplatform ranking used for the first time in 2025)
ABC	23	March 2, 2025	5.91	Final Performances/Season Finale: May 18, 2025	6.51	2024–25	Monday 8:00 pm	7.3	67
ABC	24	January 26, 2026	8.27	Final Performances/Season Finale: May 11, 2026	TBA	2025–26	Monday 8:00 pm	5.11	TBA
ABC	25	February 8, 2027		Final Performances/Season Finale: May 3, 2027		2026–27	Monday 8:00 pm		

American Idol premiered in June 2002 and became the surprise summer hit show of 2002. The first show drew 9.9 million viewers, giving Fox the best viewing figure for the 8.30 pm spot in over a year. The audience steadily grew, and by finale night, the audience had averaged 23 million, with more than 40 million watching some part of that show. That episode was placed third amongst all age groups, but more importantly it led in the 18–49 demographic, the age group most valued by advertisers.

The growth continued into the next season, starting with a season premiere of 26.5 million. The season attracted an average of 21.7 million viewers, and was placed second overall amongst the 18–49 age group. The finale night when Ruben Studdard won over Clay Aiken was also the highest-rated ever American Idol episode at 38.1 million for the final hour. By the third season, the show had become the top show in the 18–49 demographic a position it has held for all subsequent years up to and including the tenth season, and its competition stages ranked first in the nationwide overall ratings. By the fourth season, American Idol had become the most-watched series amongst all viewers on American TV for the first time, with an average viewership of 26.8 million. The show reached its peak in the fifth season with numbers averaging 30.6 million per episode, and this season remains the highest-rated of the series.

The sixth season premiered with the series' highest-rated debut episode and a few of its succeeding episodes rank among the most-watched episodes of American Idol. During this time, many television executives began to regard the show as a programming force unlike any seen before, as its consistent dominance of up to two hours, two or three nights a week, exceeded the 30- or 60-minute reach of previous hits such as NBC's The Cosby Show. The show was dubbed "the Death Star", and competing networks often rearranged their schedules in order to minimize losses. However, the sixth season also showed a steady decline in viewership over the course of the season. The season finale saw a drop in ratings of 16% from the previous year. The sixth season was the first season wherein the average results show rated higher than the competition stages (unlike in the previous seasons), and became the second-highest-rated of the series after the preceding season.

The loss of viewers continued into the seventh season. The premiere was down 11% among total viewers, and the results show in which Kristy Lee Cook was eliminated delivered its lowest-rated Wednesday show among the 18–34 demo since the first season in 2002. However, the ratings rebounded for the seventh-season finale with the excitement over the battle of the Davids, and improved over the sixth season as the series' third most watched finale. The strong finish of season seven also helped Fox become the most watched TV network in the country for the first time since its inception, a first ever in American television history for a non-Big Three major broadcast network. Overall ratings for the season were down 10% from the sixth season, which is in line with the fall in viewership across all networks due in part to the 2007–2008 Writers Guild of America strike.

The declining trend however continued into the eighth season, as total viewers numbers fell by 5–10% for early episodes compared to the seventh season, and by 9% for the finale. In the ninth season, Idol's six-year extended streak of perfection in the ratings was broken, when NBC's coverage of the 2010 Winter Olympics on February 17 beat Idol in the same time slot with 30.1 million viewers over Idol's 18.4 million. Nevertheless, American Idol overall finished its ninth season as the most watched TV series for the sixth year running, breaking the previous record of five consecutive seasons achieved by CBS' All in the Family and NBC's The Cosby Show.

In the tenth season, the total viewer numbers for the first week of shows fell 12–13%, and by up to 23% in the 18–49 demo compared to the ninth season. Later episodes, however, retained viewers better, and the season ended on a high with a significant increase in viewership for the finale – up 12% for the adults 18–49 demographic and a 21% increase in total viewers from the ninth-season finale. While the overall viewer number has increased this season, its viewer demographics have continued to age year on year – the median age this season was 47.2 compared to a median age of 32.1 in its first season. The demographics also became "whiter" over time and less diverse. Nevertheless, in the 2010–11 television season, Fox maintained its lead on over other networks with its seventh consecutive season of victory overall in the 18–49 demographic ratings in the United States.

The eleventh season, however, suffered a steep drop in ratings, a drop attributed by some to the arrival of new shows such as The Voice and The X Factor. The ratings for the first two episodes of the eleventh season fell 16–21% in overall viewer numbers and 24–27% in the 18/49 demo, while the season finale fell 27% in total viewer number and 30% in the 18–49 demo. The average viewership for the season fell below 20 million viewers the first time since 2003, a drop of 23% in total viewers and 30% in the 18/49 demo. For the first time in eight years, American Idol lost the leading position in both the total viewers number and the 18/49 demo, coming in second to NBC Sunday Night Football, although the strengths of Idol in its second year in the Wednesday-Thursday primetime slots helped Fox achieve the longest period of 18–49 demographic victory in the Nielsen ratings, standing at 8 straight years from 2004 to 2012.

The loss of viewers continued into the twelfth season, which saw the show hitting a number of series low in the 18–49 demo. The finale had 7.2 million fewer viewers than the previous season, and saw a drop of 44% in the 18–49 demo. The season viewers averaged at 13.3 million, a drop of 24% from the previous season. The thirteenth season suffered a huge decline in the 18–49 demographic, a drop of 28% from the twelfth season, and American Idol lost its Top 10 position in the Nielsen ratings by the end of the 2013–14 television season for the first time since its entry to the rankings in 2003 as a result, and never regained its Top 10 position by the series' end in 2016.

The continuing decline influenced further changes for the fourteenth season, including the loss of Coca-Cola as the show's major sponsor, and a decision to only broadcast one, two-hour show per week during the top 12 rounds (with results from the previous week integrated into the performance show, rather than having a separate results show). On May 11, 2015, prior to the fourteenth-season finale, Fox announced that the fifteenth season of American Idol would be its last. Despite these changes, the show's ratings would decline more sharply. The fourteenth-season finale was the lowest-rated finale ever, with an average of only 8.03 million viewers watching the finale. The show's ratings, however, rebounded in its final season and ended its run in 2016 as Fox's first-ever program to conclude its run without dropping from the Nielsen Top 30 most-watched television shows in each of its seasons.

For the revived series on ABC, the ratings were lower but remained stable compared to previous seasons on Fox. The finale of the seventeenth season was slightly more watched than the sixteenth.

=== Critical reception ===
Early reviews were mixed in their assessment. Ken Tucker of Entertainment Weekly considered that "As TV, American Idol is crazily entertaining; as music, it's dust-mote inconsequential". Others, however, thought that "the most striking aspect of the series was the genuine talent it revealed". It was also described as a "sadistic musical bake-off", and "a romp in humiliation". Other aspects of the show have attracted criticisms. The product placement in the show in particular was noted, and some critics were harsh about what they perceived as its blatant commercial calculations – Karla Peterson of The San Diego Union-Tribune charged that American Idol is "a conniving multimedia monster" that has "absorbed the sin of our debauched culture and spit them out in a lump of reconstituted evil". The decision to send the first season winner to sing the national anthem at the Lincoln Memorial on the first anniversary of the September 11 attacks in 2002 was also poorly received by many. Lisa de Moraes of The Washington Post noted sarcastically that "The terrorists have won" and, with a sideswipe at the show's commercialism and voting process, that the decision as to who "gets to turn this important site into just another cog in the 'Great American Idol Marketing Mandala' is in the hands of the millions of girls who have made American Idol a hit. Them and a handful of phone-redialer geeks who have been clocking up to 10,000 calls each week for their contestant of choice (but who, according to Fox, are in absolutely no way skewing the outcome)."

Some of the later writers about the show were more positive, Michael Slezak, again of Entertainment Weekly, thought that "for all its bloated, synthetic, product-shilling, money-making trappings, Idol provides a once-a-year chance for the average American to combat the evils of today's music business." Singer Sheryl Crow, who was later to act as a mentor on the show, however took the view that the show "undermines art in every way and promotes commercialism". Pop music critic Ann Powers nevertheless suggested that Idol has "reshaped the American songbook", "led us toward a new way of viewing ourselves in relationship to mainstream popular culture", and connects "the classic Hollywood dream to the multicentered popular culture of the future." Others focused on the personalities in the show; Ramin Setoodeh of Newsweek accused judge Simon Cowell's cruel critiques in the show of helping to establish in the wider world a culture of meanness, that "Simon Cowell has dragged the rest of us in the mud with him." Some such as singer John Mayer disparaged the contestants, suggesting that those who appeared on Idol are not real artists with self-respect.

Some in the entertainment industry were critical of the star-making aspect of the show. Usher, a mentor on the show, bemoaning the loss of the "true art form of music", thought that shows like American Idol made it seem "so easy that everyone can do it, and that it can happen overnight", and that "television is a lie". Musician Michael Feinstein, while acknowledging that the show had uncovered promising performers, said that American Idol "isn't really about music. It's about all the bad aspects of the music business – the arrogance of commerce, this sense of 'I know what will make this person a star; artists themselves don't know.' " That American Idol is seen to be a fast track to success for its contestants has been a cause of resentment for some in the industry. LeAnn Rimes, commenting on Carrie Underwood winning Best Female Artist in Country Music Awards over Faith Hill in 2006, said that "Carrie has not paid her dues long enough to fully deserve that award". It is a common theme that has been echoed by many others. Elton John, who had appeared as a mentor in the show but turned down an offer to be a judge on American Idol, commenting on talent shows in general, said that "there have been some good acts but the only way to sustain a career is to pay your dues in small clubs". American Idol revolutionized American pop culture and the pop idol process and has provided an opportunity for many to bypass the small club scene and allow a much larger audience to participate in and select the next potential chart topping performer.

The success of the show's alumni, however, has led to a more positive assessment of the show, and the show was described as having "proven it has a valid way to pick talent and a proven way to sell records". While the industry is divided on the show success, its impact is felt particularly strongly in the country music format. According to a CMT exec, reflecting on the success of Idol alumni in the country genre, "if you want to try and get famous fast by going to a cattle call audition on TV, Idol reasonably remains the first choice for anyone", and that country music and Idol "go together well".

American Idol was nominated for the Emmy's Outstanding Reality Competition Program for nine years but never won. Director Bruce Gower won a Primetime Emmy Award for Outstanding Directing For A Variety, Music Or Comedy Series in 2009, and the show won a Creative Arts Emmys each in 2007 and 2008, three in 2009, and two in 2011, as well as a Governor's Award in 2007 for its Idol Gives Back edition. It won the People's Choice Award, which honors the popular culture of the previous year as voted by the public, for favorite competition/reality show in 2005, 2006, 2007, 2010, 2011 and 2012. It won the first Critics' Choice Television Award in 2011 for Best Reality Competition.

In 2013, TV Guide ranked the series No. 48 on its list of the 60 Best Series of All Time.

=== Geographical, ethnic, and gender bias ===
Throughout the series, twelve of the seventeen Idol winners, including its first five, had come from the Southern United States. A large number of other finalists during the series' run have also hailed from the American South, including Clay Aiken, Kellie Pickler, and Chris Daughtry, who are all from North Carolina. In 2012, an analysis of the 131 contestants who have appeared in the finals of all seasons of the show up to that point found that 48% have some connection to the Southern United States.

The show itself was popular in the Southern United States, with households in the Southeastern United States 10% more likely to watch American Idol during the eighth season in 2009, and those in the East Central region, such as Kentucky, were 16 percent more likely to tune into the series. Data from Nielsen SoundScan, a music-sales tracking service, showed that of the 47 million CDs sold by Idol contestants through January 2010, 85 percent were by contestants with ties to the American South.

Theories given for the success of Southerners on Idol have been: more versatility with musical genres, as the Southern U.S. is home to several music genre scenes; not having as many opportunities to break into the pop music business; text-voting due to the South having the highest percentage of cell-phone only households; and the strong heritage of music and singing, which is notable in the Bible Belt, where it is in church that many people get their start in public singing. Others also suggest that the Southern character of these contestants appeal to the South, as well as local pride. According to fifth season winner Taylor Hicks, who is from the state of Alabama, "People in the South have a lot of pride ... So, they're adamant about supporting the contestants who do well from their state or region."

For five consecutive seasons, starting in the seventh season, the title was given to a white male who plays the guitar – a trend that Idol pundits call the "White guy with guitar" or "WGWG" factor. Just hours before the eleventh-season finale, where Phillip Phillips was named the winner, Richard Rushfield, author of the book American Idol: The Untold Story, said, "You have this alliance between young girls and grandmas and they see it, not necessarily as a contest to create a pop star competing on the contemporary radio, but as .... who's the nicest guy in a popularity contest", he says, "And that has led to this dynasty of four, and possibly now five, consecutive, affable, very nice, good-looking white boys."

=== Start order bias ===
Some fans call the final performance of the night the "pimp spot" because it usually receives a big boost in votes, due to the recency effect. By performing first, a performer may benefit from the primacy effect, but any other early performance may be stifled. The second performance spot is sometimes called the "un-pimp spot" because it is the least beneficial.

== Controversy ==
The show was criticized in earlier seasons over the onerous contract contestants had to sign that gave excessive control to 19 Entertainment over their future careers and handed a large part of their future earnings to the management.

Individual contestants have generated controversy in this competition for their past actions or for being 'ringers' planted by the producers. A number of contestants have been disqualified for various reasons, such as for having an existing contract or undisclosed criminal record, although the show has also been accused of a double standard for disqualifying some but not others.

Voting results have been a consistent source of controversy. The mechanism of voting has aroused considerable criticism, most notably in the second season when Ruben Studdard beat Clay Aiken in a close vote, and in the eighth season, when the massive increase in text votes fueled the texting controversy. Concerns about power voting have been expressed from the first season. Since 2004, votes also have been affected to a limited degree by online communities such as DialIdol and Vote for the Worst.

== Cultural impact ==
=== Television ===
The enormous success of the show and the revenue it generated were transformative for the Fox Broadcasting Company. American Idol and other shows such as Survivor and Who Wants to Be a Millionaire? were credited for expanding reality television programming in the United States in the 1990s and 2000s, and Idol became the most watched non-scripted primetime television series, which it remained for almost a decade, from 2003 to 2012, breaking records on U.S. television (dominated by drama shows and sitcoms in the preceding decades). On several occasions, notably in 2003 and 2008, American Idol overtook the Academy Awards as the most-watched non-sports entertainment event on U.S. television, marking the most recent time as of 2026 that a live regular non-sports primetime series has garnered such viewership in the country.

The show pushed Fox to become the number one U.S. TV network in overall viewers in 2008 and among adults aged 18–49, the key demographic coveted by advertisers, for an unprecedented eight consecutive years from 2005 to 2012. Its success also helped lift the ratings of other shows that were scheduled around it such as House and Bones, and Idol, for years, was Fox's strongest platform primetime television program for promoting eventual hit shows of the 2010s (of the same network) such as Glee, New Girl and Empire. The show, its creator Simon Fuller claimed, "saved Fox".

The show's massive success in the mid-2000s to early 2010s spawned a number of imitating singing-competition shows, such as Rock Star, Nashville Star, The Voice, Rising Star, The Sing-Off, and The X Factor. The number of imitative singing shows on American television had reached 17 by 2016. Its format also served as a blueprint for non-singing TV shows such as Dancing with the Stars and So You Think You Can Dance, most of which contribute to the current highly competitive reality TV landscape on American television.

=== Music ===
As one of the most successful shows in U.S. television history, American Idol has had a strong impact not just on television, but also in the wider world of entertainment. It helped create a number of highly successful recording artists, such as Kelly Clarkson, Daughtry and Carrie Underwood, as well as others of varying notability. The alumni of the show's original run scored 13 Grammy Award wins out of 54 Grammy nominations up to its end in 2016, with Underwood and Clarkson receiving 10 wins combined.

Various American Idol alumni had success on various record charts around the world; in the U.S. they had achieved 345 number ones on the Billboard charts in its first 10 years, and 458 by its last year of broadcast in 2016, with 100 achieved by Kelly Clarkson alone. According to Fred Bronson, author of books on the Billboard charts, no other entity has ever created as many hit-making artists and bestselling albums and singles. In 2007, American Idol alums accounted for 2.1% of all music sales. Its alumni have a massive impact on radio; in 2007, American Idol had become "a dominant force in radio" according to Rich Meyer, president of the radio station monitoring research company Mediabase. By 2010, four winners each had more than a million radio spins, with Kelly Clarkson leading the field with over four million spins.

At the end of the show's original run on Fox in 2016, Idol's contestants have sold more than 60 million albums in the U.S. and more than 100 million records globally, more than 175 of which are certified platinum or gold. Its participants have generated more than 450 Billboard No. 1 hits and sold more than 260 million digital downloads.

=== Film and theater ===
The impact of American Idol was also strongly felt in musical theater, where many of Idol alumni have forged successful careers. The striking effect of former American Idol contestants on Broadway has been noted and commented on. The casting of a popular Idol contestant can lead to significantly increased ticket sales. Other alumni have gone on to work in television and films, the most notable being Jennifer Hudson who, on the recommendation of the Idol vocal coach Debra Byrd, won a role in Dreamgirls and eventually went on to win an Academy Award for her performance. She later became the show's first and only alumnus ever to win the EGOT (Emmy, Grammy, Oscar, and Tony). In all, as of 2026, American Idol finalists have amounted to five Grammy Award winners (Clarkson, Barrino, Hudson, Underwood and Mandisa), two Emmy Award winners (Clarkson and Hudson), and an Academy Award, BAFTA Award, Tony Award, Golden Globe, Screen Actors Guild Award and Critics' Choice Award winner (Hudson).

In 2007, a musical based on the show, Idol: The Musical, played off-Broadway. The musical closed after its official opening night.

== Revenue and commercial ventures ==
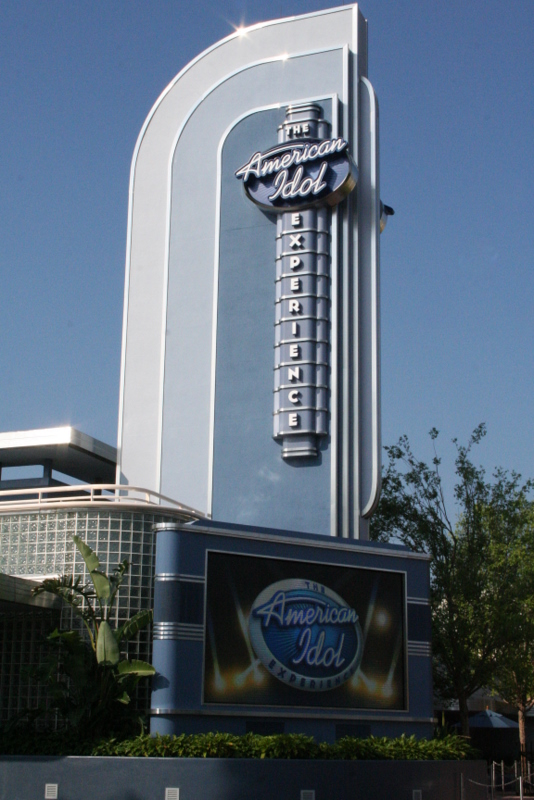
The American Idol Experience marquee sign

The dominance of American Idol in the ratings had made it the most profitable show in U.S. TV for many years. The show was estimated to generate $900 million for the year 2004 through sales of TV ads, albums, merchandise and concert tickets. By the seventh season, the show was estimated to earn around $900 million from its ad revenue alone, not including ancillary sponsorship deals and other income. One estimate puts the total TV revenue for the first eight seasons of American Idol at $6.4 billion. Sponsors that bought fully integrated packages can expect a variety of promotions of their products on the show, such as product placement, adverts and product promotion integrated into the show, and various promotional opportunities. Other off-air promotional partners pay for the rights to feature "Idol" branding on their packaging, products and marketing programs. American Idol also partnered with Disney in its theme park attraction The American Idol Experience.

=== Advertising revenue ===
American Idol became the most expensive series on broadcast networks for advertisers starting the fourth season, and by the next season, it had broken the record in advertising rate for a regularly scheduled prime-time network series, selling over $700,000 for a 30-seconds slot, and reaching up to $1.3 million for the finale. Its ad prices reached a peak in the seventh season at $737,000. Estimated revenue more than doubled from $404 million in the third season to $870 million in the sixth season. While that declined from the eighth season onwards, it still earned significantly more than its nearest competitor, with advertising revenue topping $800 million annually the next few seasons. However, the sharp drop in ratings in the eleventh season also resulted in a sharp drop in advertising rate for the twelfth season, and the show lost its leading position as the costliest show for advertisers. By 2014, ad revenue from had fallen to $427 million where a 30-second spot went for less than $300,000. For the relaunched Idol on ABC, it has been reported that a 30-second spot may cost between $120,000 and $160,000.

=== Media sponsorship ===
Ford Motor Company and Coca-Cola were two of the first sponsors of American Idol in its first season. The sponsorship deal cost around $10 million in the first season, rising to $35 million by the seventh season, and between $50 and $60 million in the tenth season. The third major sponsor AT&T Wireless joined in the second season but ended after the twelfth season, and Coca-Cola officially ended its sponsorship after the thirteenth season amidst the declining ratings of Idol in the mid-2010s. iTunes sponsored the show since the seventh season.

American Idol prominent display of its sponsors' logo and products had been noted since the early seasons. By the sixth season, Idol showed 4,349 product placements according to Nielsen Media Research. The branded entertainment integration proved beneficial to its advertisers – promotion of AT&T text-messaging as a means to vote successfully introduced the technology into the wider culture, and Coca-Cola has seen its equity increased during the show.

- Coca-Cola – Cups bearing logo of Coca-Cola, and occasionally its subsidiary Vitaminwater, are featured prominently on the judges table. Contestants are shown between songs held in the "Coca-Cola Red Room", the show's equivalent of the green room. (The Coca-Cola logo however is obscured during rebroadcast in the UK which until 2011 banned product placement.)
- Ford – Contestants appear in the special Ford videos on the results shows, and winners Kelly Clarkson, Taylor Hicks, and Kris Allen have also appeared in commercials for Ford. The final two each won a free Ford Mustang in the fourth through sixth seasons, Ford Escape Hybrid in the seventh season, Ford Fusion Hybrid in the eighth season, Ford Fiesta in the ninth season, and 2013 Ford Fusion in the eleventh season. In the tenth season Scotty McCreery chose a Ford F-150 and Lauren Alaina chose Shelby Mustang. In the red room, there is a glass table with a Ford wheel as its base.
- AT&T – AT&T Mobility is promoted as the service provider for text-voting. AT&T created an ad campaign that centered on an air-headed teenager going around telling people to vote.
- Apple iTunes – Ryan Seacrest announces the availability of contestants' performances exclusively via iTunes. Videos are regularly shown of contestants learning their songs by rehearsing with iPods.
- Previous sponsors include Old Navy and Clairol's Herbal Essences. In the second and third seasons, contestants sometimes donned Old Navy clothing for their performances with celebrity stylist Steven Cojocaru assisting with their wardrobe selection, and contestants received Clairol-guided hair makeovers. In the seventh-season finale, both David Cook and David Archuleta appeared in "Risky Business"-inspired commercials for Guitar Hero, a sponsor of the tour that year.

Coca-Cola's archrival PepsiCo declined to sponsor American Idol at the show's start. What the Los Angeles Times later called "missing one of the biggest marketing opportunities in a generation" contributed to Pepsi losing market share, by 2010 falling to third place from second in the United States. PepsiCo sponsored the American version of Cowell's The X Factor in hopes of not repeating its Idol mistake until its cancellation.

For the revived series on ABC, Macy's and Johnson & Johnson's Zyrtec signed on as the major sponsors of the show.

=== American Idol tour ===
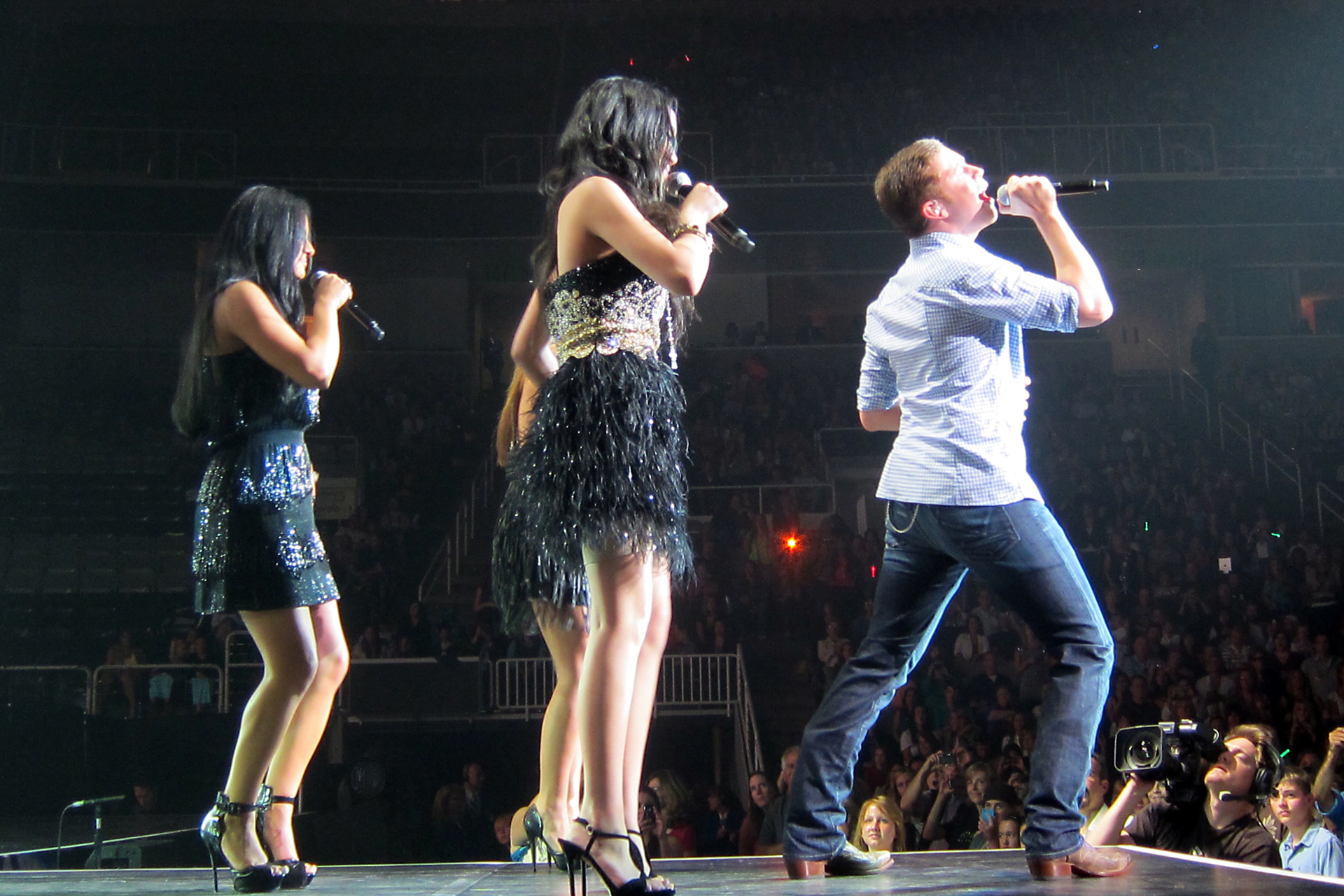
Tenth season American Idol tour, Scotty McCreery performing with Thia Megia, Haley Reinhart and Pia Toscano

The top ten (eleven in the tenth season, five in the fourteenth season, and seven in the sixteenth season) toured at the end of every season except for the fifteenth and seventeenth seasons. In the twelfth season tour a semi-finalist who won a sing-off was also added to the tour. Kellogg's Pop-Tarts was the sponsor for the first seven seasons, and Guitar Hero was added for the seventh season tour. M&M's Pretzel Chocolate Candies was a sponsor of the ninth season tour. The fifth season tour was the most successful tour with gross of over $35 million. However no concert tour was organized in the fifteenth and seventeenth seasons, the only seasons not to have an associated tour. The sixteenth season tour featured the band In Real Life as an opener on select dates.

== Idol Gives Back ==
Idol Gives Back was a special charity event started in season six featuring performances by celebrities and various fund-raising initiatives. This event was also held in seasons seven and nine and has raised nearly $185 million in total.

=== Music releases ===
American Idol has traditionally released studio recordings of contestants' performances as well as the winner's coronation single for sale. For the first five seasons, the recordings were released as a compilation album at the end of the season. All five of these albums reached the top ten in Billboard 200 which made American Idol the most successful soundtrack franchise of any motion picture or television program. Starting late in the fifth season, individual performances were released during the season as digital downloads, initially from the American Idol official website only. In the seventh season the live performances and studio recordings were made available during the season from iTunes when it joined as a sponsor. In the tenth season the weekly studio recordings were also released as compilation digital album straight after performance night.

19 Recordings, a recording label owned by 19 Entertainment, currently hold the rights to phonographic material recorded by all the contestants. 19 Recordings originally partnered with Bertelsmann Music Group (BMG) to promote and distribute the recordings through its labels RCA Records, Arista Records, J Records, and Jive Records. From 2005–2007, BMG partnered with Sony Music Entertainment to form a joint venture known as Sony BMG Music Entertainment. From 2008 to 2010, following their acquisition of BMG, Sony Music handled the distribution of American Idol's music. In 2010, UMG's Interscope-Geffen-A&M Records replaced Sony as the music label for American Idol.

=== Tie-ins ===
American Idol video games

- American Idol – PlayStation 2, PC, Game Boy Advance, mobile phone
- Karaoke Revolution Presents American Idol – PlayStation 2
- Karaoke Revolution Presents American Idol Encore – PlayStation 2, PlayStation 3, Wii, Xbox 360
- Karaoke Revolution Presents American Idol Encore 2 – PlayStation 3, Wii, Xbox 360

== Theme park attraction ==
On February 14, 2009, The Walt Disney Company debuted "The American Idol Experience" at its Disney's Hollywood Studios theme park at the Walt Disney World Resort in Florida. In this live production, co-produced by 19 Entertainment, park guests chose from a list of songs and auditioned privately for Disney cast members. Those selected then performed on a stage in a 1000-seat theater replicating the Idol set. Three judges, whose mannerisms and style mimicked those of the real Idol judges, critiqued the performances. Audience members then voted for their favorite performer. There were several preliminary-round shows during the day that culminated in a "finals" show in the evening where one of the winners of the previous rounds that day was selected as the overall winner. The winner of the finals show received a "Dream Ticket" that granted them front-of-the-line privileges at any future American Idol audition. The attraction closed on August 30, 2014.

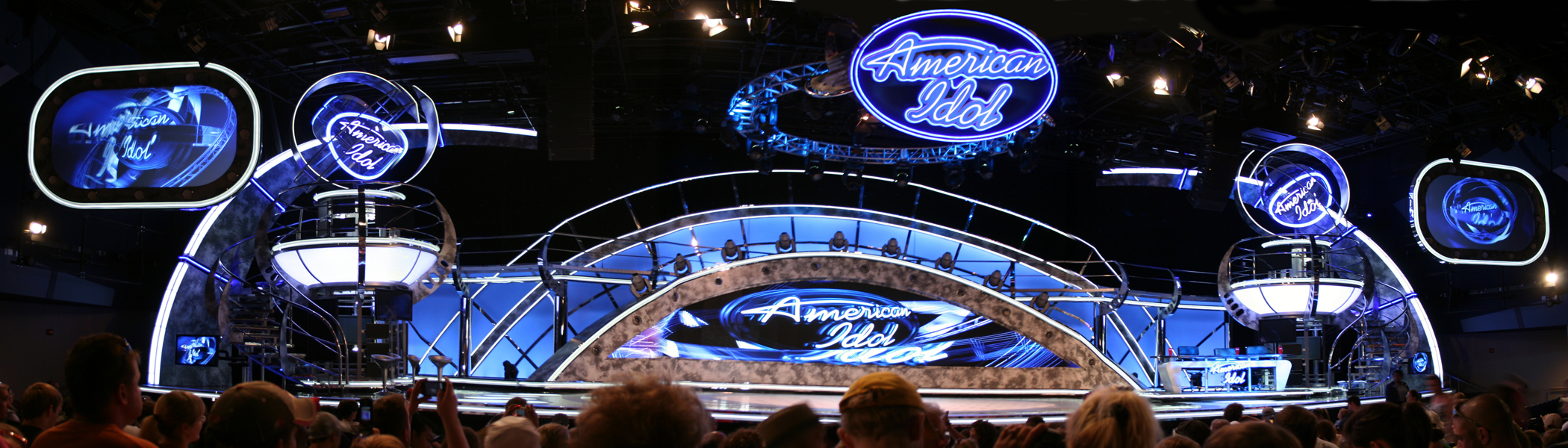
American Idol Experience stage

== Other broadcasts ==
American Idol is broadcast to over 100 nations worldwide. In most nations these are not live broadcasts and may be tape delayed by several days or weeks, except for other season finales that are aired live in several countries simulcast with the U.S. broadcast on Fox (2002–2016) and ABC (since 2018). In Canada, the first thirteen seasons of American Idol were aired live countrywide by CTV and/or CTV Two, in simulcast with Fox. CTV dropped Idol after its thirteenth season and in August 2014, Yes TV announced that it had picked up Canadian rights to American Idol beginning in its 2015 season. In 2017, it was announced the show would return to CTV Two for its sixteenth season. Since season nineteen, the show started airing on Citytv. In Slovakia, American Idol was broadcast on Jednotka.

In Latin America, the show is broadcast and subtitled by Sony Entertainment Television. In Southeast Asia, it is broadcast by Sony Channel every Monday and Tuesday nine or ten hours after since its revival. In Philippines, it is aired every Thursday and Friday nine or ten hours after its United States telecast; from 2004 to 2007 on ABC; 2008–11 on QTV, then GMA News TV; 2012–16, 2018–19 on ETC; and since 2024 on TV5. In Indonesia, it was aired on RCTI in the 2002 to 2003 season with the Indonesian subtitles, before Indonesian Idol was held in the 2004, aired after each episode ended, and in the 2011 to 2013 season it was broadcast by B-Channel (now RTV). In Australia, it aired a few hours after the U.S. telecast. It was aired on Network Ten from 2002 to 2008 and then again in 2013. Between 2008 and 2012 it aired on Fox8 and the thirteenth and fourteenth seasons (2014–15) it aired on digital channel, Eleven, a sister channel to Network Ten. Its final season (2016) aired on Fox8 hours after the original U.S. broadcast. The show enjoyed a lot of popularity in Australia throughout the 2000s before declining in the ratings. In the United Kingdom, episodes were aired one day after the U.S. broadcast on digital channel ITV2. In the twelfth season, the episodes aired on 5*. It was also aired in Ireland on TV3 two days after the telecast. In Brazil and Israel, the show airs two days after its original broadcast, and broadcast live during the season finale. In the instances where the airing is delayed, the shows may sometimes be combined into one episode to summarize the results. In Italy, the twelfth season was broadcast by La3. In Singapore, The show was broadcast on Mediacorp Channel 5 for the ninth and tenth seasons.

== Spin-offs ==
- Idol: The Musical
- American Juniors
- American Idol Rewind
- American Idol Extra
- The Next Great American Band
- From Justin to Kelly
- An American Idol Christmas
- Idol Camp
- Idol Wrap

== See also ==
- List of American Idol finalists
- List of awards and nominations for American Idol contestants
