= American Idol season synopses =

Summary of reality show American Idol

- Genre: Reality competition
- Created by: Simon Fuller
- Based on: Pop Idol
- Directed by: Andy Scheer (2002); Bruce Gowers (2002–2010); Ken Warwick (2003–2013); Nigel Lythgoe (2003–2008, 2012); Paul Miller (2003); John Pritchett (2008); Bill DeRonde (2009, 2014–2016); Gregg Gelfand (2008, 2010–2013); Russell Norman (2013, 2015–2016, 2019); Louis J. Horvitz (2014); Glenn Weiss (2015); Phil Heyes (2015–2016, 2018–present, Bootcamp onwards); Ben Thursby-Palmer (2018, 2020–2025, Auditions only); Ryan Goble (2019); Sam Wrench (2020, 2025–present); Julia Knowles (2022)
- Presented by: Ryan Seacrest; Brian Dunkleman
- Country of origin: United States
- Original language: English
- No. of seasons: 24
- No. of episodes: 734 (list of episodes)

Production
- Running time: 22–104 minutes
- Production companies: Fremantle North America (Note: Credited as FremantleMedia North America from 2002–2018.); 19 Entertainment

Original release
- Network: Fox
- Release: June 11, 2002 – April 7, 2016
- Network: ABC
- Release: March 11, 2018 – present

On American Idol, each season premieres with the audition round, which take place in different cities across the United States. The audition episodes typically feature a mix of potential finalists, interesting characters and woefully inadequate contestants. Each successful contestant receives a golden or platinum ticket to proceed on to the next round in Hollywood. Based on their performances during the Hollywood round (Las Vegas round from 2011 to 2013), 24 to 36 contestants are selected by the judges to participate in the semifinals. From the semifinals onward, the contestants perform their songs live, with the judges making their critiques after each performance. The contestants are voted for by the viewing public, and the outcome of the public votes is then revealed during a results segment. The results segment feature group performances by the contestants as well as guest performers. The Top 3 results also features homecoming events for the Top 3 finalists. The season reaches its climax in a two-hour results finale show, where the winner of the season is revealed.

With the exception of the first two seasons, the contestants in the semifinals onward perform in front of a studio audience. They perform with a full band in the finals. The current musical director is Kris Pooley, who has been with the show since the ABC revival began in 2018. In previous seasons, the Idol band was led by Rickey Minor, who initially served from 2005 to 2010; Minor left the show in 2010 to become musical director for The Tonight Show with Jay Leno. Minor was replaced by Ray Chew, who served from 2011 to 2013. Chew left the show in late 2013 to become musical director for Dancing with the Stars, where he has remained ever since. In February 2014, The Tonight Show with Jay Leno ended, and Minor returned to American Idol where he again served as musical director. Minor remained on the show until the original version ended in April 2016. Assistance has also been given by vocal coaches and song arrangers, such as Michael Orland and Debra Byrd to contestants behind the scene.

Starting with the seventh season in 2008, contestants may perform with a musical instrument from the Hollywood rounds onward. In later seasons, the contestants were allowed to perform with a musical instrument in the auditions. From the shows' inception in 2002 until 2010, performance shows were usually aired live on Tuesday nights, followed by the results shows on Wednesday night. In 2011, however, the performance shows were moved to Wednesday nights and the results shows on Thursday nights, which remained until the fourteenth season began in 2015 (with the exception of the finales of season ten, eleven and thirteen, where the performance shows and results shows reverted to Tuesday nights and Wednesday nights, respectively).

In 2015, starting with the fourteenth season, the show discontinued separate results shows, with both performance and result shows airing on the same night. This rule has been in place ever since. On the fourteenth season, the show aired on Wednesday nights, and on the fifteenth season, the show aired on Thursday nights. Since the ABC revival began in 2018, the show has been airing on Sunday nights and Monday nights, though both nights contain performances and do not feature separate results shows.

== 2002–2016: Fox ==
=== Season 1 (2002) ===
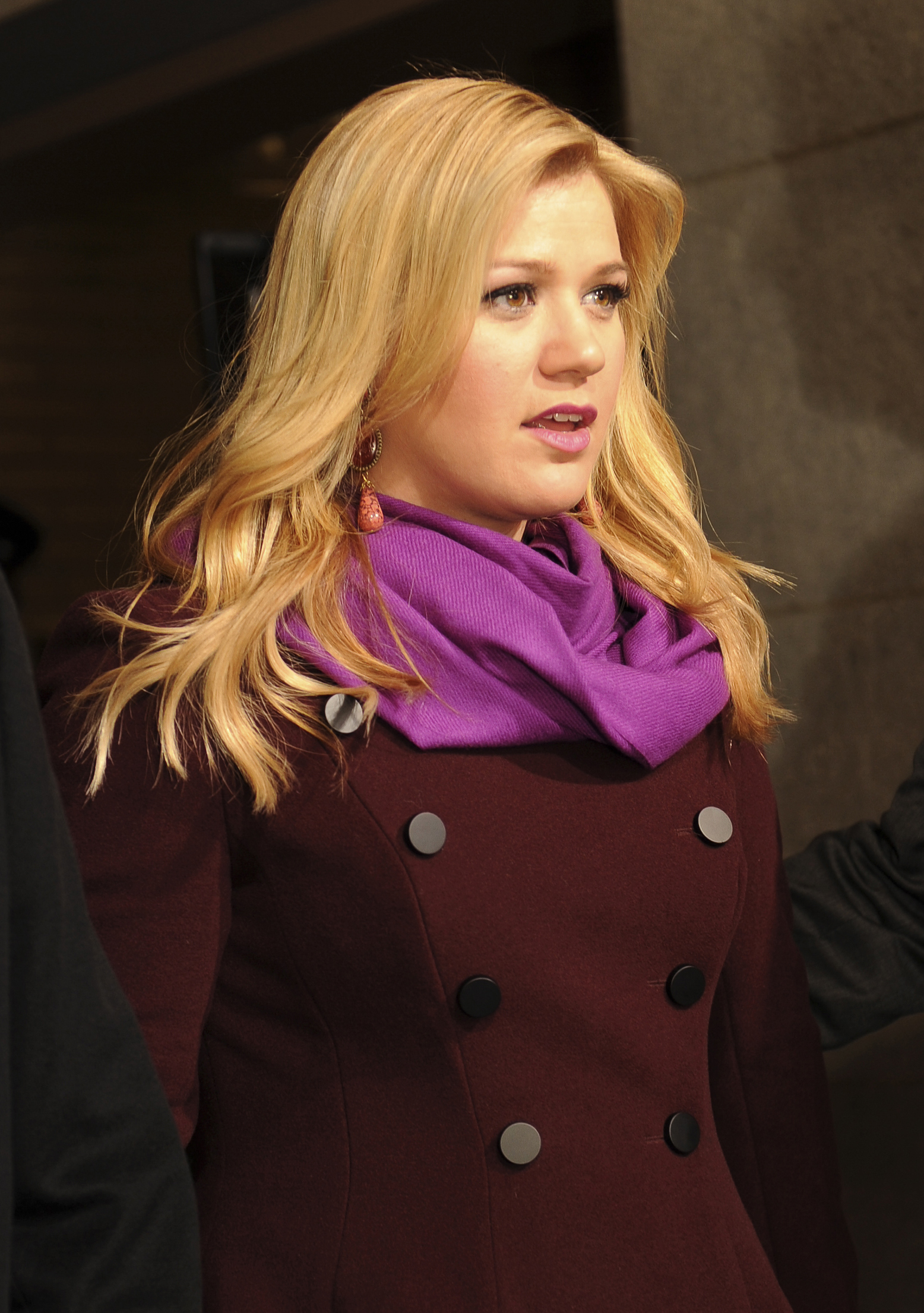
Kelly Clarkson, the first season winner

The first season of American Idol debuted as a summer replacement show in June 2002 on the Fox network. It was co-hosted by Ryan Seacrest and Brian Dunkleman. Randy Jackson, Paula Abdul, and Simon Cowell served as judges.

In the audition rounds, 121 contestants were selected from around 10,000 who attended the auditions. These were cut to 30 for the semifinal, with ten going on to the finals. One semifinalist, Delano Cagnolatti, was disqualified for lying to evade the show's age limit. One of the early favorites, Tamyra Gray, was eliminated at the top four, the first of several such shock eliminations that were to be repeated in later seasons. Christina Christian was hospitalized before the top six result show due to chest pains and palpitations, and she was eliminated while she was in the hospital. Jim Verraros was the first openly gay contestant on the show; his sexual orientation was revealed on his blog, but it was removed during the competition after a request from the show producers over concerns that it might be unfairly influencing votes.

The final showdown was between Justin Guarini, one of the early favorites, and Kelly Clarkson. Clarkson was not initially thought of as a contender, but impressed the judges with some good performances in the final rounds, such as her performance of Aretha Franklin's "Natural Woman", and Betty Hutton's "Stuff Like That There", and eventually won the crown on September 4, 2002.

In what was to become a tradition, Clarkson performed the coronation song during the finale, and released the song immediately after the season ended. The single, "A Moment Like This", went on to break a 38-year-old record held by The Beatles for the biggest leap to number one on the Billboard Hot 100. Guarini did not release any song immediately after the show and remains the only runner-up not to do so. Both Clarkson and Guarini made a musical film, From Justin to Kelly, which was released in 2003 but was widely panned. Clarkson has since become one of the most successful Idol contestants internationally, with worldwide album sales of more than 25 million.

Starting September 30, 2006, this season was repackaged as "American Idol Rewind" and syndicated directly to stations in the U.S.

=== Season 2 (2003) ===
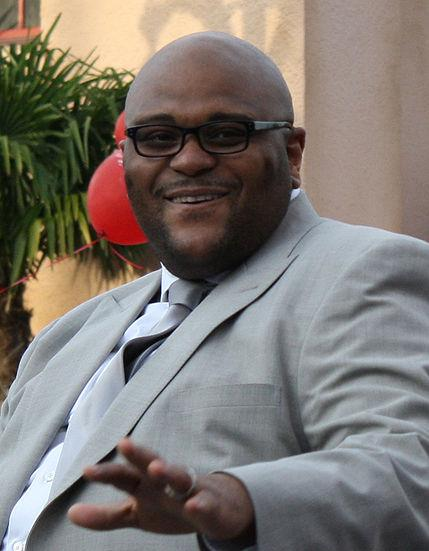
Ruben Studdard, the second season winner

Following the success of the first season, the second season was moved up to air in January 2003. The number of episodes increased, as did the show's budget and the charge for commercial spots. Dunkleman left the show, leaving Ryan Seacrest as the lone host. Randy Jackson, Paula Abdul, and Simon Cowell returned as judges. Kristin Adams was a correspondent for this season.

Corey Clark was disqualified during the finals for having an undisclosed police record; however, he later alleged that he and Paula Abdul had an affair while on the show and that this contributed to his expulsion. Clark also claimed that Abdul gave him preferential treatment on the show due to their affair. The allegations were dismissed by Fox after an independent investigation. Two semi-finalists were also disqualified that year – Jaered Andrews for an arrest on an assault charge, and Frenchie Davis for having previously modeled for an adult website.

The season finale drew more than 38 million viewers, marking Idol's biggest audience ever for a single episode. Ruben Studdard emerged as the winner, beating Clay Aiken by a small margin. Out of a total of 24 million votes, Studdard finished just 134,000 votes ahead of Aiken. This slim margin of victory was controversial due to the large number of calls that failed to get through. In an interview prior to the fifth season, executive producer Nigel Lythgoe indicated that Aiken had led the fan voting from the wildcard week onward until the finale.

Both finalists found success after the show, but Aiken out-performed Studdard's coronation song "Flying Without Wings" with his single release from the show "This Is the Night", as well as in their subsequent album releases. The fourth-place finisher Josh Gracin also enjoyed some success as a country singer.

=== Season 3 (2004) ===
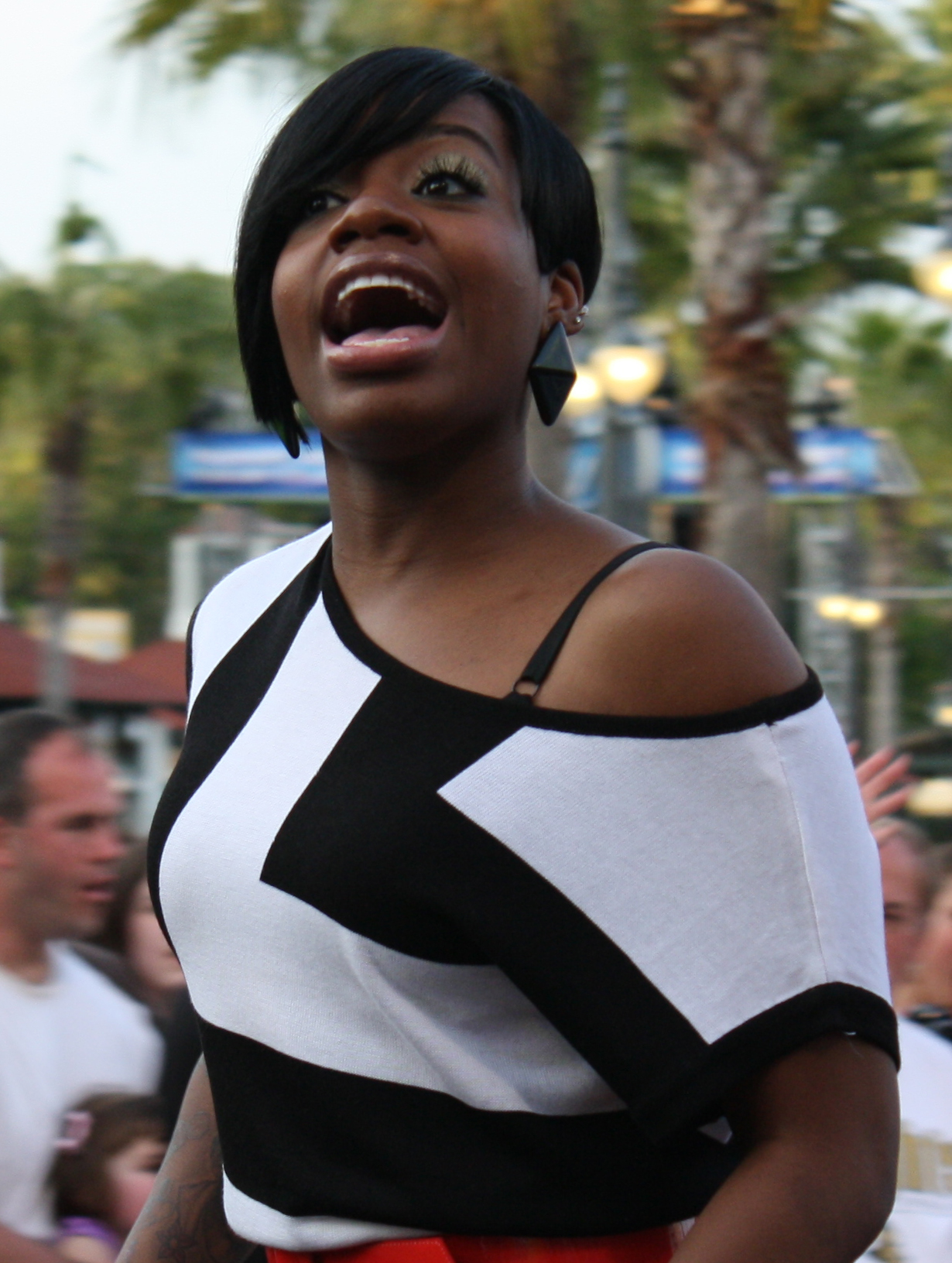
Fantasia Barrino, the third season winner

The third season premiered on January 19, 2004. Ryan Seacrest returned as host, and Randy Jackson, Paula Abdul, and Simon Cowell returned as judges. One of the most talked-about contestants during the audition process was William Hung whose off-key rendition of Ricky Martin's "She Bangs" received widespread attention. His exposure on Idol landed him a record deal and surprisingly he became the third bestselling singer from that season.

Much media attention on the season had been focused on the three black singers, Fantasia Barrino, LaToya London, and Jennifer Hudson, dubbed the Three Divas. All three unexpectedly landed on the bottom three on the top seven result show, with Hudson controversially eliminated. Elton John, who was one of the mentors that season, called the results of the votes "incredibly racist". The prolonged stays of John Stevens and Jasmine Trias in the finals, despite negative comments from the judges, had aroused resentment, so much so that John Stevens reportedly received a death threat, which he dismissed as a joke 'blown out of proportion'.

The performance of "Summertime" by Barrino, later known simply as "Fantasia", at Top 8 was widely praised, and Simon Cowell considered it as his favorite Idol moment in the nine seasons he was on the show. Fantasia and Diana DeGarmo were the last two finalists, and Fantasia was crowned as the winner. Fantasia released as her coronation single "I Believe", a song co-written by the first season finalist Tamyra Gray, and DeGarmo released "Dreams".

=== Season 4 (2005) ===
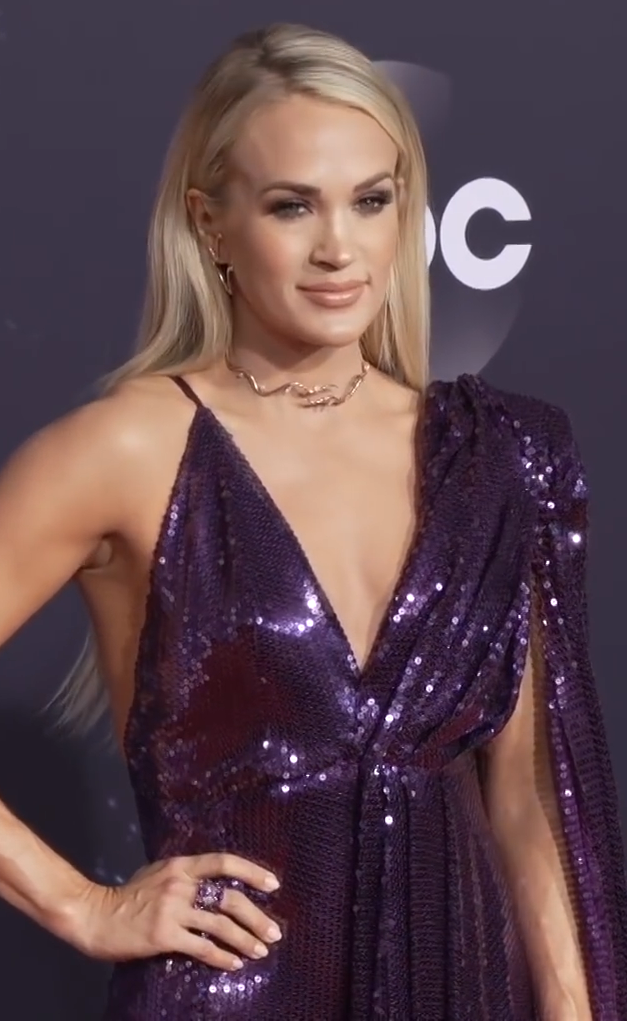
Carrie Underwood, the fourth season winner

The fourth season premiered on January 18, 2005. Ryan Seacrest returned as host, and Randy Jackson, Paula Abdul, and Simon Cowell returned as judges. This was the first full season of the series to be aired in high definition; the finale of the third season was also aired in high definition. The number of those attending the auditions by now had increased to over 100,000 from the 10,000 of the first season. The age limit was raised to 28 in this season, and among those who benefited from this new rule were Constantine Maroulis and Bo Bice, the two rockers of the show.

The top 12 finalists originally included Mario Vazquez, but he dropped out citing 'personal reasons' and was replaced by Nikko Smith. Later, an employee of Fremantle Media, which produces the show, sued the company for wrongful termination, claiming that he was dismissed after complaining about lewd behavior by Vazquez toward him during the show.

During the top 11 week, due to a mix-up with the contestants' telephone number, voting was repeated on what was normally the result night, with the result reveal postponed until the following night.

In May 2005, Underwood was announced the winner, with Bice the runner-up. Both Underwood and Bice released the coronation song "Inside Your Heaven", with Underwood's version of the song making her the first country artist ever to debut at number-one on the Billboard Hot 100 chart. As of 2015, Underwood has become the most successful Idol contestant in the U.S., selling 16 million albums in the country, while selling a total of 65 million records worldwide.

=== Season 5 (2006) ===
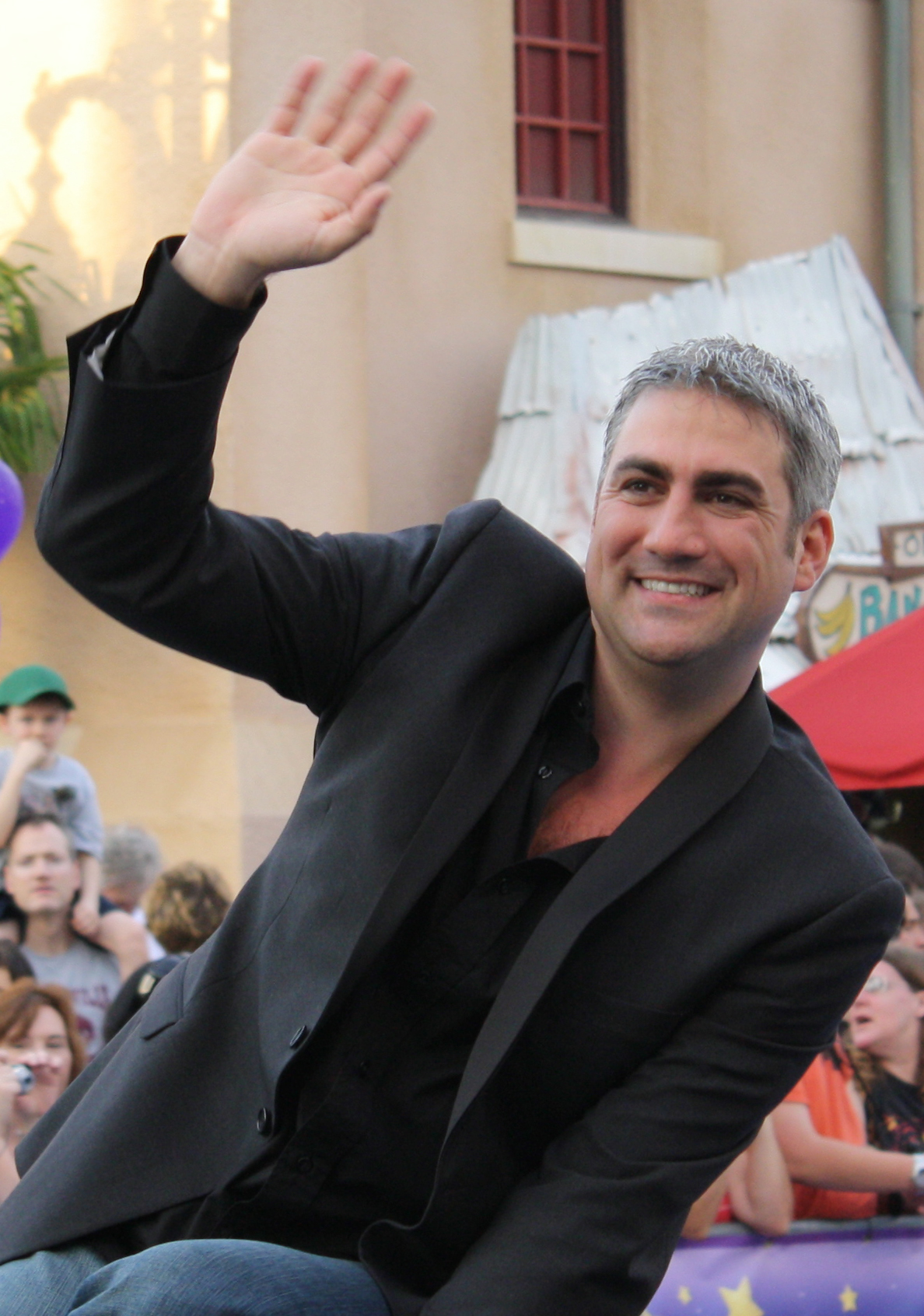
Taylor Hicks, the fifth season winner

The fifth season began on January 17, 2006. Ryan Seacrest returned as host, and Randy Jackson, Paula Abdul, and Simon Cowell returned as judges. It remains the highest-rated season in the show's run so far. Two of the more prominent contestants during the Hollywood round were the Brittenum twins who were later disqualified for identity theft.

Chris Daughtry's performance of Fuel's "Hemorrhage (In My Hands)" on the show was widely praised and led to an invitation to join the band as Fuel's new lead singer, an invitation he declined. His performance of Live's version of "I Walk the Line" was well received by the judges but later criticized in some quarters for not crediting the arrangement to Live. He was eliminated at the top four in a shocking result.

On May 30, 2006, Taylor Hicks was named American Idol, with Katharine McPhee the runner-up. "Do I Make You Proud" was released as Hicks' first single and McPhee's was "My Destiny".

Despite being eliminated earlier in the season, Chris Daughtry (as lead of the band Daughtry) became the most successful recording artist from this season. Other contestants, such as Hicks, McPhee, Bucky Covington, Mandisa, Kellie Pickler, and Elliott Yamin have had varying levels of success.

=== Season 6 (2007) ===
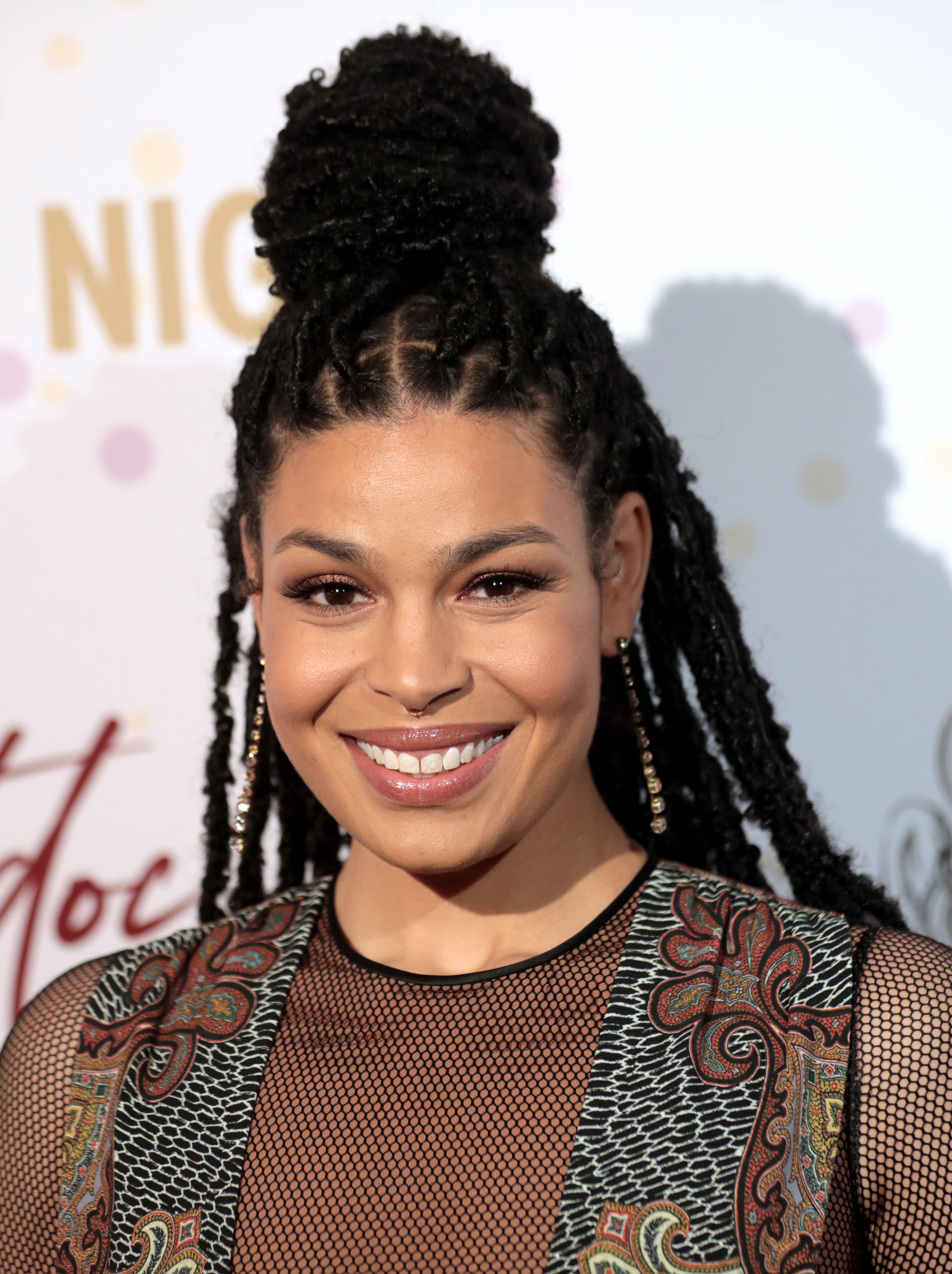
Jordin Sparks, the sixth season winner

The sixth season began on Tuesday, January 16, 2007. Ryan Seacrest returned as host, and Randy Jackson, Paula Abdul, and Simon Cowell returned as judges. The premiere drew a massive audience of 37.3 million viewers, peaking in the last half hour with more than 41 million viewers.

Teenager Sanjaya Malakar was the season's most talked-about contestant for his unusual hairdo, and for managing to survive elimination for many weeks due in part to the weblog Vote for the Worst and satellite radio personality Howard Stern, who both encouraged fans to vote for him. However, on the Top 7 results, Sanjaya was voted off.

This season saw the first Idol Gives Back telethon-inspired event, which raised more than $76 million in corporate and viewer donations. No contestant was eliminated that week, but two (Phil Stacey and Chris Richardson) were eliminated the next.

In the May 23 season finale, Jordin Sparks was declared the winner with the runner-up being Blake Lewis. Sparks has had some success as a recording artist post-Idol.

This season also saw the launch of the American Idol Songwriter contest which allows fans to vote for the "coronation song". Thousands of recordings of original songs were submitted by songwriters, and 20 entries selected for the public vote. The winning song, "This Is My Now", was performed by both finalists during the finale and released by Sparks on May 24, 2007.

=== Season 7 (2008) ===
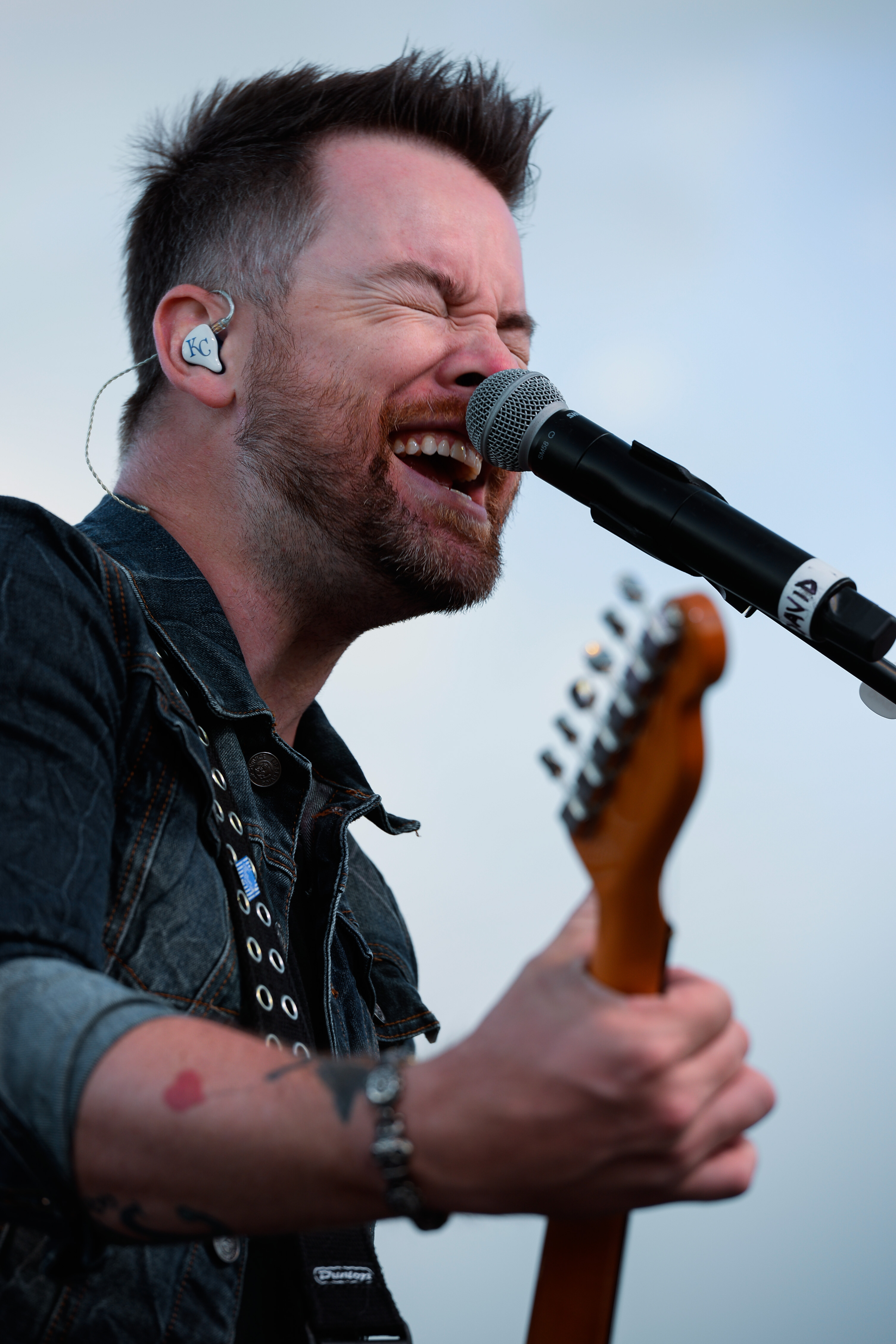
David Cook, the seventh season winner

The seventh season premiered on January 15, 2008, for a two-day, four-hour premiere. Ryan Seacrest returned as host, and Randy Jackson, Paula Abdul, and Simon Cowell returned as judges. The media focused on the professional status of the seventh season contestants, the so-called 'ringers', many of whom, including Kristy Lee Cook, Brooke White, Michael Johns, and in particular Carly Smithson, had prior recording contracts. Contestant David Hernandez also attracted some attention due to his past employment as a stripper.

For the finals, American Idol debuted a new state-of-the-art set and stage on March 11, 2008, along with a new on-air look. David Cook's performance of "Billie Jean" on top-ten night was lauded by the judges, but provoked controversy when they apparently mistook the Chris Cornell arrangement to be David Cook's own even though the performance was introduced as Cornell's version. Cornell himself said he was 'flattered' and praised David Cook's performance. David Cook was taken to the hospital after the top-nine performance show due to heart palpitations and high blood pressure.

David Archuleta's performance of John Lennon's "Imagine" was considered by many as one of the best of the season. Jennifer Lopez, who was brought in as a judge in the tenth season, called it a beautiful song-moment that she will never forget. Jason Castro's semi-final performance of "Hallelujah" also received considerable attention, and it propelled Jeff Buckley's version of the song to the top of the Billboard digital song chart. This was the first season in which contestants' recordings were released onto iTunes after their performances, and although sales information was not released so as not to prejudice the contest, leaked information indicated that contestants' songs frequently reached the top of iTunes sales charts.

Idol Gives Back returned on April 9, 2008, and raised $64 million for charity.

The finalists were Cook and Archuleta. David Cook was announced the winner on May 21, 2008, the first rocker to win the show. Both Cook and Archuleta had some success as recording artists with both selling over a million albums in the U.S.

The American Idol Songwriter contest was also held this season. From ten of the most popular submissions, each of the final two contestants chose a song to perform, although neither of their selections was used as the "coronation song". The winning song, "The Time of My Life", was recorded by David Cook and released on May 22, 2008.

=== Season 8 (2009) ===
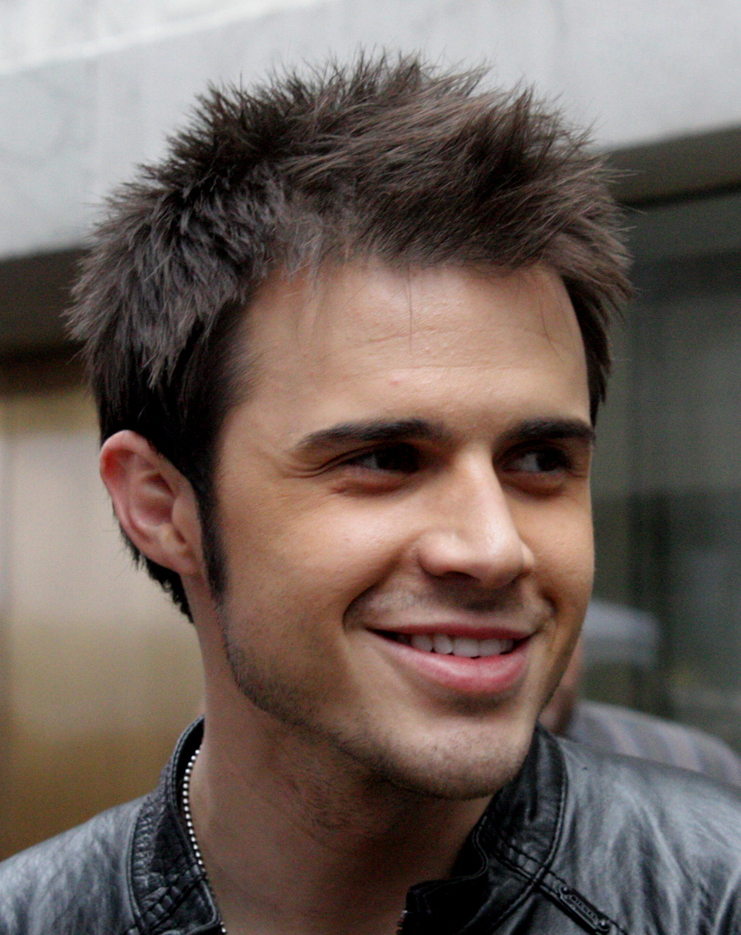
Kris Allen, the eighth season winner

The eighth season premiered on January 13, 2009. Ryan Seacrest returned as host, and Randy Jackson, Paula Abdul, and Simon Cowell returned as judges. This season featured the first major change to the judging panel; a fourth judge, Kara DioGuardi, was introduced. Mike Darnell, the president of alternative programming for Fox, stated that the season would focus more on the contestants' personal life.

This was also the first season without executive producer Nigel Lythgoe who left to focus on the international versions of his show So You Think You Can Dance. The Hollywood round was moved to the Kodak Theatre for 2009 and was also extended to two weeks. Idol Gives Back was canceled for this season due to the global recession at the time.

There were 13 finalists this season, but two were eliminated in the first result show of the finals. A new feature introduced was the "Judges' Save", and Matt Giraud was saved from elimination at the top seven by the judges when he received the fewest votes. The next week, Lil Rounds and Anoop Desai were eliminated.

The two finalists were Kris Allen and Adam Lambert, both of whom had previously landed in the bottom three at the top five. Allen won the contest in the most controversial voting result since the second season. It was claimed, and then later retracted, that 38 million of the 100 million votes cast on the night came from Allen's home state of Arkansas alone, and that AT&T employees unfairly influenced the votes by giving lessons on power-texting at viewing parties in Arkansas.

Both Allen and Lambert released the coronation song, "No Boundaries" which was co-written by DioGuardi. This is the first season in which the winner failed to achieve gold album status.

=== Season 9 (2010) ===
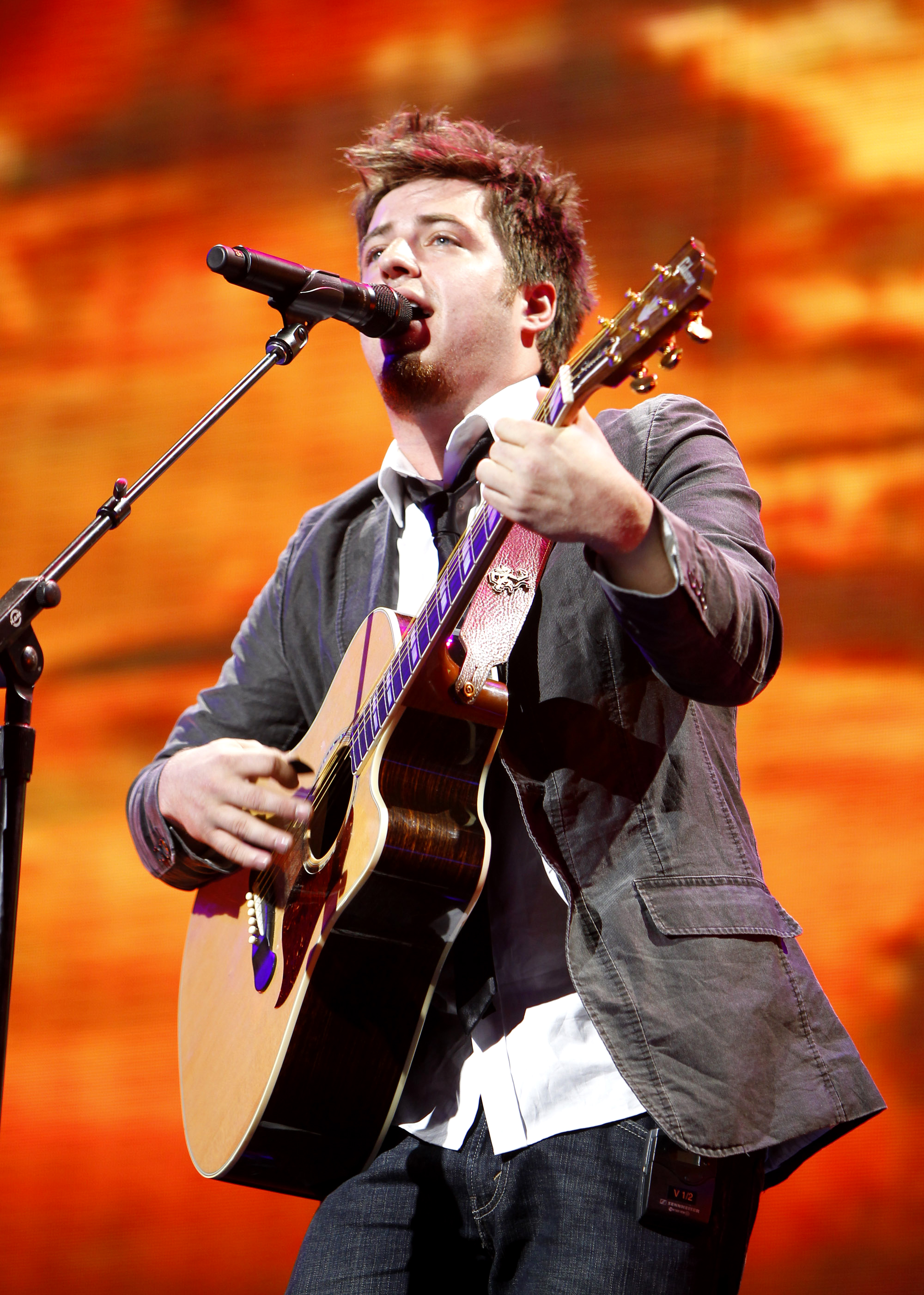
Lee DeWyze, the ninth season winner

The ninth season premiered on January 12, 2010. Ryan Seacrest returned as host, and Randy Jackson, Kara DioGuardi, and Simon Cowell returned as judges. Paula Abdul left the show and Ellen DeGeneres replaced Abdul at the start of Hollywood Week. One of the most prominent auditioners this season was General Larry Platt whose performance of "Pants on the Ground" became a viral hit song.

Crystal Bowersox, who has Type-I diabetes, fell ill due to diabetic ketoacidosis on the morning of the girls performance night for the top 20 week and was hospitalized. The schedule was rearranged so the boys performed first and she could perform the following night instead; she later revealed that Ken Warwick, the show producer, wanted to disqualify her but she begged to be allowed to stay on the show.

Michael Lynche was the lowest vote getter at top nine and was given the Judges' Save. The next week Katie Stevens and Andrew Garcia were eliminated. That week, Adam Lambert was invited back to be a mentor, the first Idol alum to do so. Idol Gives Back returned this season on April 21, 2010, and raised $45 million.

A special tribute to Simon Cowell was presented in the finale for his final season with the show. Many figures from the show's past, including Paula Abdul, made an appearance.

The final two contestants were Lee DeWyze and Bowersox. DeWyze was declared the winner during the May 26 finale. No new song was used as coronation song this year; instead, the two finalists each released a cover song – DeWyze chose U2's "Beautiful Day", and Bowersox chose Patty Griffin's "Up to the Mountain". This is the first season where neither finalist achieved significant album sales.

=== Season 10 (2011) ===
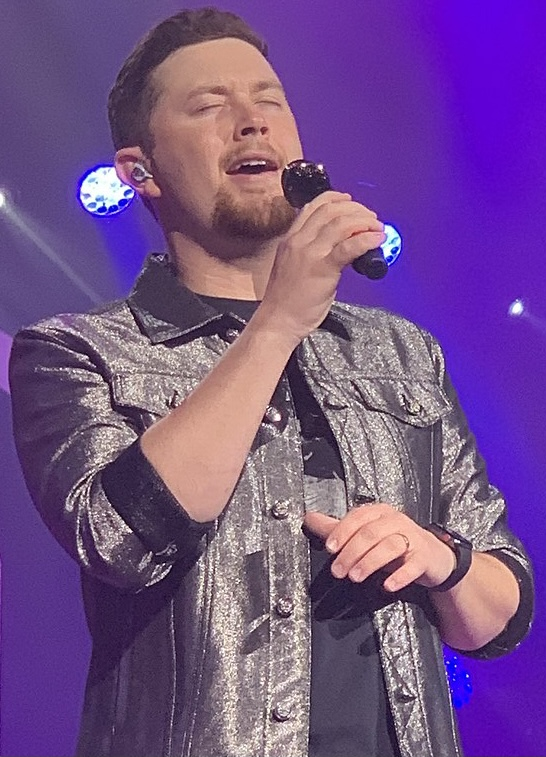
Scotty McCreery, the tenth season winner

The tenth season premiered on January 19, 2011. Ryan Seacrest returned as host and Randy Jackson returned as a judge. Many changes were introduced this season, from the format to the personnel of the show. Jennifer Lopez and Steven Tyler joined Randy Jackson as judges following the departures of Simon Cowell (who left to launch the American version of The X Factor), Kara DioGuardi (whose contract was not renewed) and Ellen DeGeneres, who decided to leave the show on her own terms.

Randy Jackson was the only judge from the ninth season to return for the tenth. Nigel Lythgoe returned as executive producer. Jimmy Iovine, chairman of the Interscope Geffen A&M label group, the new partner of American Idol, acted as the in-house mentor in place of weekly guest mentors, although in later episodes special guest mentors such as Beyoncé, will.i.am and Lady Gaga were brought in.

The tenth season is the first to include online auditions where contestants could submit a 40-second video audition via Myspace. Karen Rodriguez was one such auditioner and reached the final rounds.

One of the more prominent contestants this year was Chris Medina, whose story of caring for his brain-damaged fiancée received widespread coverage. Medina was cut in the Top 40 round. Casey Abrams, who suffers from ulcerative colitis, was hospitalized twice and missed the Top 13 result show. The judges used their one save on Abrams on the Top 11, and as a result this was the first season that 11 finalists went on tour instead of 10. In the following week, Naima Adedapo and Thia Megia were both eliminated.

Pia Toscano, one of the presumed favorites to advance far in the season, was unexpectedly eliminated on April 7, 2011, finishing in ninth place. Her elimination drew criticisms from some former Idol contestants, as well as actor Tom Hanks. After Idol, Jennifer Lopez helped guide her career.

The two finalists in 2011 were Lauren Alaina and Scotty McCreery, both teenage country singers. McCreery won the competition on May 25, being the youngest male winner and the fourth male in a row to win American Idol. McCreery released his first single, "I Love You This Big", as his coronation song, and Alaina released "Like My Mother Does". McCreery's debut album, Clear as Day, became the first debut album by an Idol winner to reach No. 1 on the US Billboard 200 since Ruben Studdard's Soulful in 2003, and he became the youngest male artist to reach No. 1 on the Billboard 200.

=== Season 11 (2012) ===
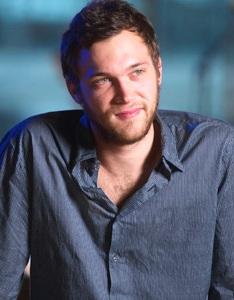
Phillip Phillips, the eleventh season winner

The eleventh season premiered on January 18, 2012. Ryan Seacrest returned as host and Steven Tyler, Jennifer Lopez, and Randy Jackson returned as judges. One more finalist would join the Top 24 making it the Top 25, which was later revealed to be Jermaine Jones. However, on March 14, Jones was disqualified in 12th place for concealing arrests and outstanding warrants. Jones denied the accusation that he concealed his arrests.

Finalist Phillip Phillips suffered from kidney pain and was taken to the hospital before the Top 13 results show, and later received medical procedure to alleviate a blockage caused by kidney stones. He was reported to have eight surgeries during his Idol run, and had considered quitting the show due to the pain. He underwent surgery to remove the stones and reconstruct his kidney soon after the season had finished.

Jessica Sanchez received the fewest votes during the Top 7 week, and the judges decided to use their "save" option on her, making her the first female recipient of the save. The following week, unlike previous seasons, Colton Dixon was the only contestant sent home. Sanchez later made the final two, the first season where a recipient of the save reached the finale.

Phillips became the winner, beating Sanchez. During the finale, fifth season finalist Ace Young proposed marriage to third season runner-up Diana DeGarmo on stage – which she accepted.

Phillips released "Home" as his coronation song, while Sanchez released "Change Nothing". Phillips' "Home" has since become the best selling of all coronation songs, with over 5 million copies sold.

=== Season 12 (2013) ===
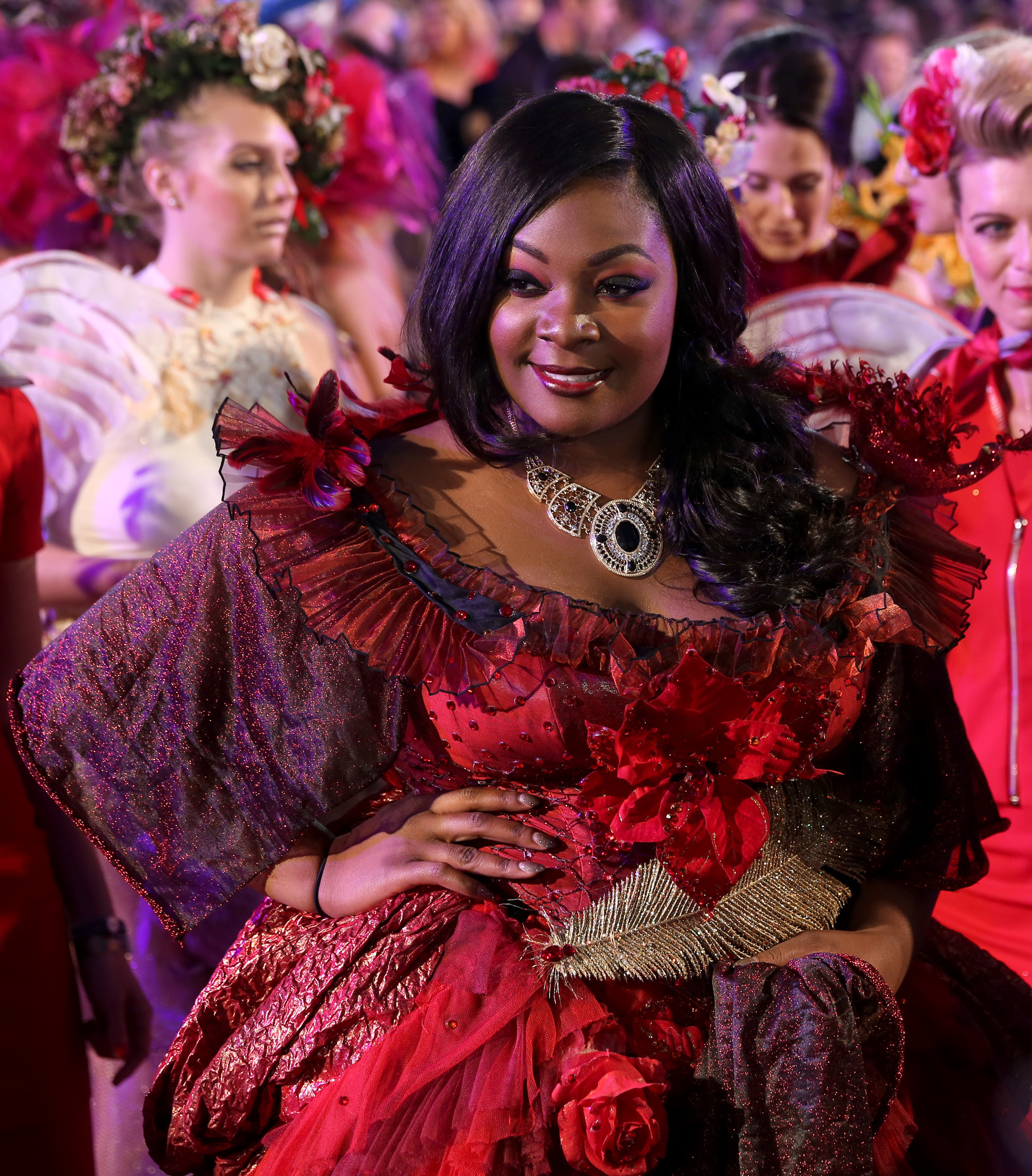
Candice Glover, the twelfth season winner

The twelfth season premiered on January 16, 2013. Ryan Seacrest returned as host and Randy Jackson returned as a judge. Judges Jennifer Lopez and Steven Tyler left the show after two seasons. Randy Jackson was the only judge from the eleventh season to return for the twelfth. This season's judging panel consisted of Randy Jackson, along with Mariah Carey, Keith Urban and Nicki Minaj.

This was the first season since the ninth season to have four judges on the panel. The pre-season buzz and the early episodes of the show were dominated by the feud between the judges Minaj and Carey after a video of their dispute was leaked to TMZ.

The top 10 contestants started with five males and five females; however, the males were eliminated consecutively in the first five weeks, with Lazaro Arbos the last male to be eliminated. For the first time in the show's history, the top 5 contestants were all female. It was also the first time that the judges' "save" was not used, and the top four contestants were therefore given an extra week to perform again with their votes carried over with no elimination in the first week.

23-year-old Candice Glover won the season with Kree Harrison taking the runner-up spot. Glover became the first female to win American Idol since Jordin Sparks, who won the show in 2007. Glover released "I Am Beautiful" as a single while Harrison released "All Cried Out" immediately after the show. Glover sold poorly with her debut album, and this is also the first season that the runner-up was not signed by a music label.

Towards the end of the season, Randy Jackson, the last remaining of the original judges, announced he would no longer serve as a judge to pursue other business ventures. Both judges Mariah Carey and Nicki Minaj also decided to leave after one season to focus on their music careers.

=== Season 13 (2014) ===
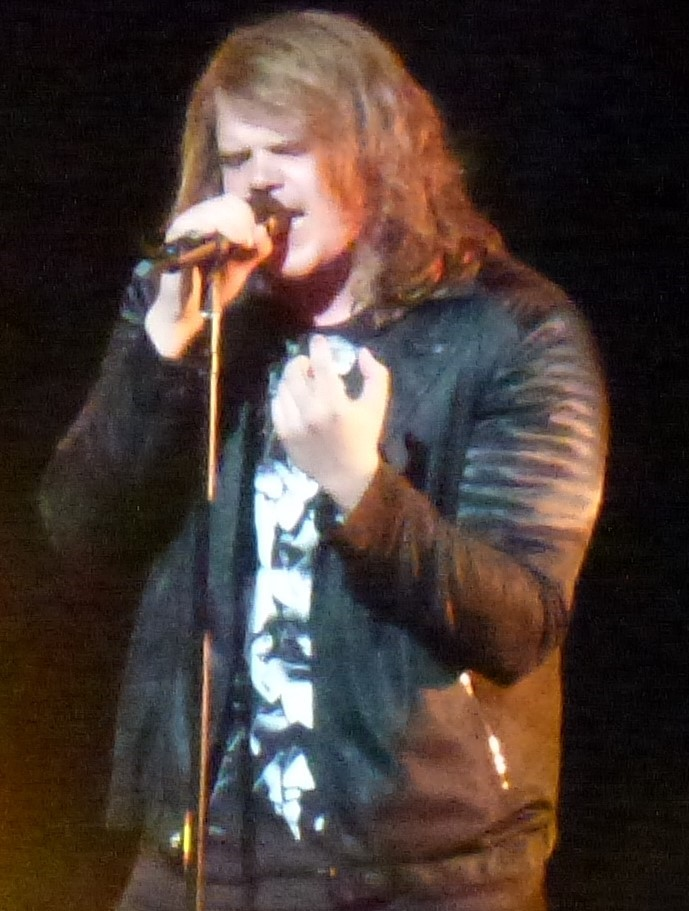
Caleb Johnson, the thirteenth season winner

The thirteenth season premiered on January 15, 2014. Ryan Seacrest returned as host and Keith Urban returned as a judge. Urban was the only judge from the twelfth season to return as a judge for the thirteenth season. Randy Jackson returned, though Jackson moved from the judging panel to the role of in-mentor. Mariah Carey and Nicki Minaj left the panel after one season. Former judge Jennifer Lopez returned to the show, and former mentor Harry Connick, Jr. returned to the show as a judge, both joining Urban on the panel. Connick Jr. served as a mentor for Idol in 2010 and 2012. Also, Nigel Lythgoe and Ken Warwick were replaced as executive producers by Per Blankens, Jesse Ignjatovic and Evan Pragger. Bill DeRonde replaced Warwick as a director of the audition episodes, while Louis J. Horvitz replaced Gregg Gelfand as a director of the show.

This was the first season where the contestants were permitted to perform songs they wrote themselves in the final rounds. In the Top 8, Sam Woolf received the fewest votes, but he was saved from elimination by the judges. The 500th episode of the series was the Top 3 performance night.

Caleb Johnson was named the winner of the season, with Jena Irene as the runner-up. Johnson released "As Long as You Love Me" as his coronation single while Irene released "We Are One".

=== Season 14 (2015) ===
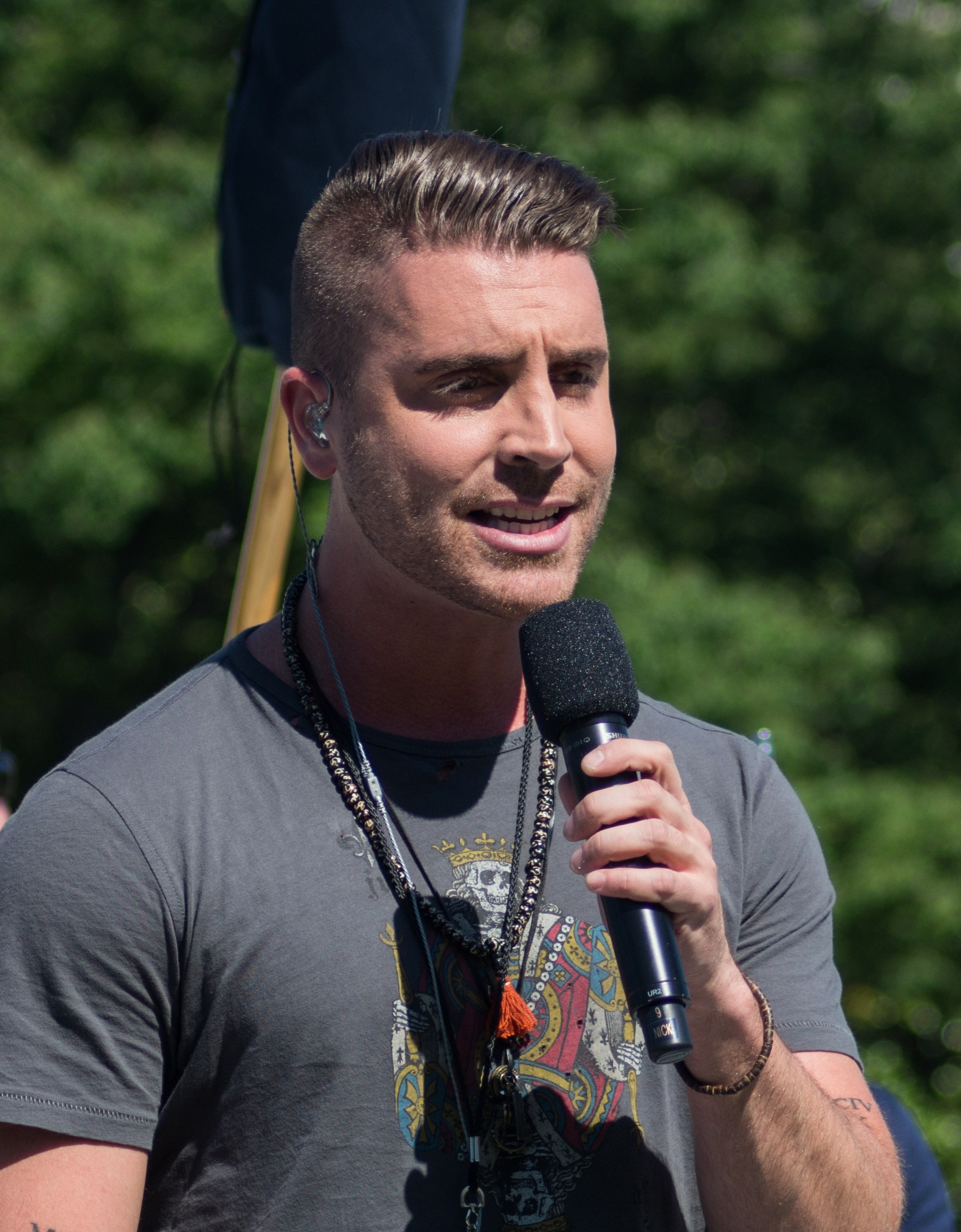
Nick Fradiani, the fourteenth season winner

The fourteenth season premiered on January 7, 2015. Ryan Seacrest returned as host, and Jennifer Lopez, Keith Urban and Harry Connick, Jr. returned as judges. Eighth season runner-up Adam Lambert filled in for Urban during the New York City auditions. Randy Jackson did not return as the in-house mentor and left the show permanently. Scott Borchetta replaced Jackson as the mentor.

Changes this season include only airing one episode a week during the final ten. Coca-Cola ended their longtime sponsorship of the show and Ford Motor Company maintained a reduced role. The winner of the season also received a recording contract with Big Machine Records.

Nick Fradiani won the season, defeating Clark Beckham. Fradiani became the first winner from the Northeast region. Fradiani released "Beautiful Life" as his coronation single while Beckham released "Champion". Jax, the third place finalist, also released a single called "Forcefield".

=== Season 15 (2016) ===
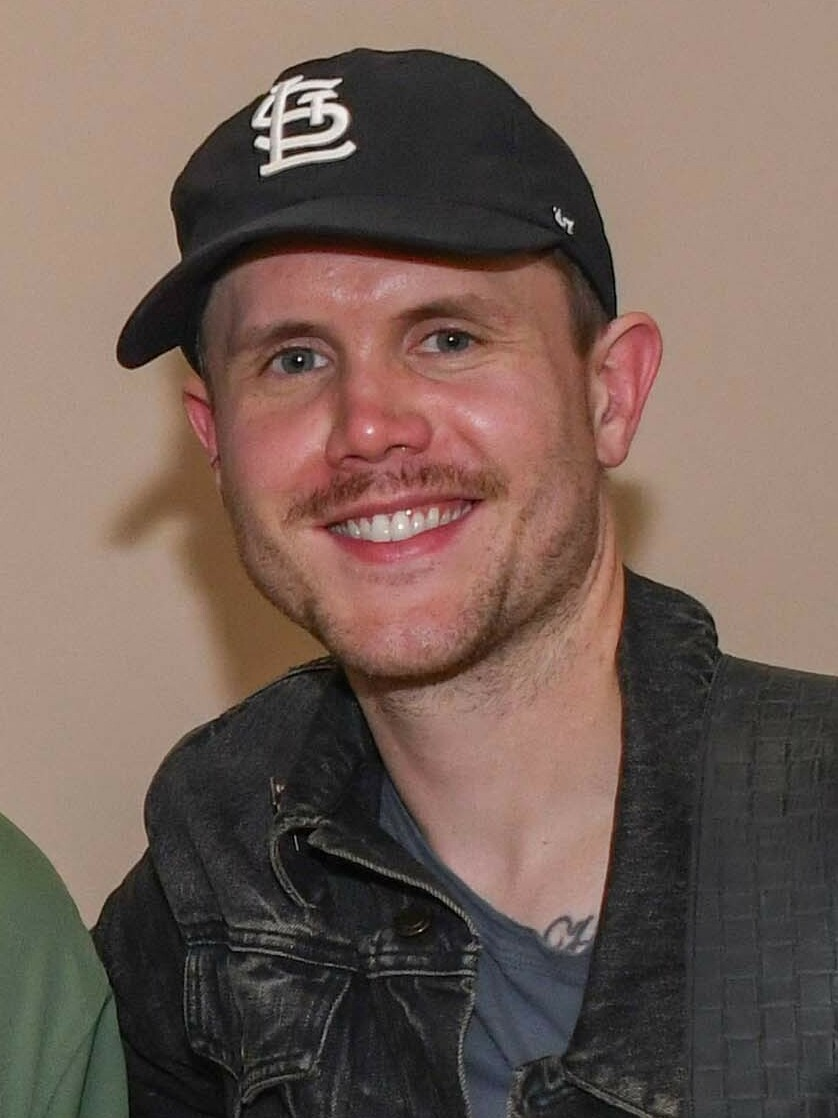
Trent Harmon, the fifteenth season winner

Fox announced on May 11, 2015, that the fifteenth season would be the final season of American Idol; as such, the season was expected to have an additional focus on the program's alumni. Ryan Seacrest returned as host, and Jennifer Lopez, Keith Urban and Harry Connick, Jr. all returned as judges. The fifteenth season premiered on January 6, 2016. The season was shortened by four weeks compared to previous years. During the finale episode, President Barack Obama praised the millions of young people that voted for contestants and pitched that they vote in the upcoming election. The farewell season concluded on April 7, 2016. Seacrest signed off by saying: "And one more time—this is so tough—we say to you from Hollywood, goodnight America!", about one minute later, just seconds before the show concluded, Seacrest quickly added "for now." hinting that the show may have already been in talks to return (whether on Fox or another network) in the near future.

Trent Harmon won the season against runner-up La'Porsha Renae. Harmon released "Falling" co-written by Keith Urban as his coronation song. Renae's "Battles", third-place finisher Dalton Rapattoni's "Strike A Match" and fourth-place finisher MacKenzie Bourg's "Roses" were also released as singles.

== 2018–present: ABC revival ==
In early 2017, Variety reported that Fremantle Media was in talks to revive the show for NBC or for its original network, Fox. A dispute between Fremantle and Core Media Group derailed these plans. On May 2, 2017, it was announced that ABC had made a bid to revive the program; one week later, on May 9, ABC acquired the rights to the series, and American Idol returned for the 2017–18 television season.

=== Season 16 (2018) ===
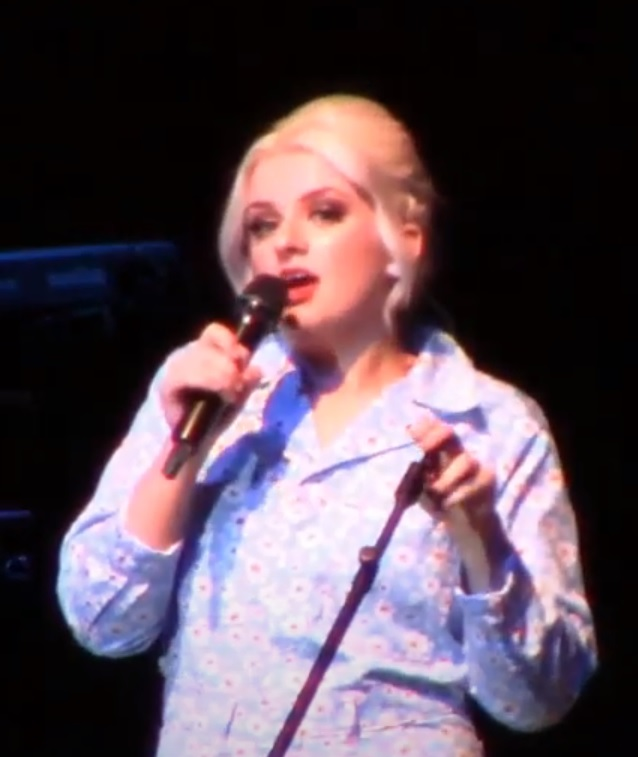
Maddie Poppe, the sixteenth season winner

In July 2017, it was announced that Ryan Seacrest would return as host, and by September 2017 it was revealed that Luke Bryan, Katy Perry, and Lionel Richie would serve as judges. The sixteenth season premiered on March 11, 2018. This was the first season of American Idol to air on ABC. The season was again shortened compared to the previous season to twelve weeks, with multiple elimination in the final rounds. Unlike previous seasons where only two finalists remained in the final episode, three finalists performed in the finale. On May 21, 2018, the season concluded with Maddie Poppe crowned the winner, beating Caleb Lee Hutchinson as runner-up and Gabby Barrett in third place. Her winning song was "Going, Going, Gone". Caleb Lee Hutchinson released "Johnny Cash Heart" as a single, while Gabby Barrett's song was "Rivers Deep".

=== Season 17 (2019) ===
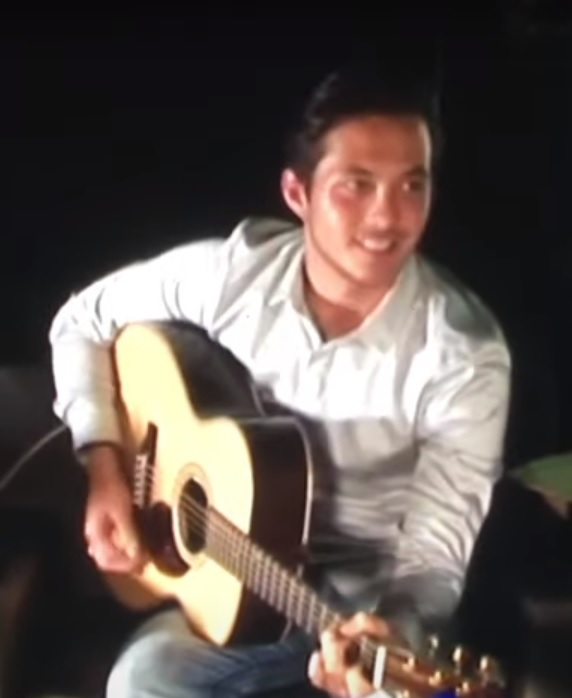
Laine Hardy, the seventeenth season winner

ABC renewed the revival series for another season. Seacrest returned as host, and Bryan, Perry and Richie returned as judges. The seventeenth season premiered on March 3, 2019. For the finale, the show no longer features separate performance and result shows. On May 19, 2019, the season concluded with three finalists, with Madison VanDenburg eliminated in third place after performing two songs, and the final two performing their last song. For the first time, there were no separate performance and grand finale shows this season. Laine Hardy was crowned the winner and Alejandro Aranda runner-up. Hardy released a single, "Flame", immediately after the win, but Aranda did not. However, Aranda later released a song he performed in the finale, "Tonight", under the name Scarypoolparty on June 28, 2019.

=== Season 18 (2020) ===
On May 13, 2019, the series was renewed for an eighteenth season and it premiered on February 16, 2020. Seacrest returned as host, and Bryan, Perry and Richie returned as judges. For the first time, due to the ongoing COVID-19 pandemic, from the top 20 to the finale, the contestants performed in their own homes, while Ryan Seacrest hosted the show remotely in his own home in Los Angeles with the judges also in their respective homes. The season was also further truncated, with the top 5 performing in the finale. Each finalist also performed only two songs for the finale. On May 17, the season concluded, with Just Sam crowned as the winner, with Arthur Gunn finishing as the runner-up. "Rise Up", the song Just Sam performed for their audition and reprised on the finale, was released as their debut song.

=== Season 19 (2021) ===
On May 15, 2020, ABC renewed the series for a nineteenth season and it premiered on February 14, 2021. Seacrest returned as host, and Bryan, Perry and Richie returned as judges. Later in October, it was announced that Bobby Bones would return as mentor. On May 23, the season concluded, with Chayce Beckham crowned the winner, with Willie Spence finishing as the runner-up and Grace Kinstler in third place. "23", the song Chayce Beckham wrote and performed for Top 4, was released as his debut song.

=== Season 20 (2022) ===
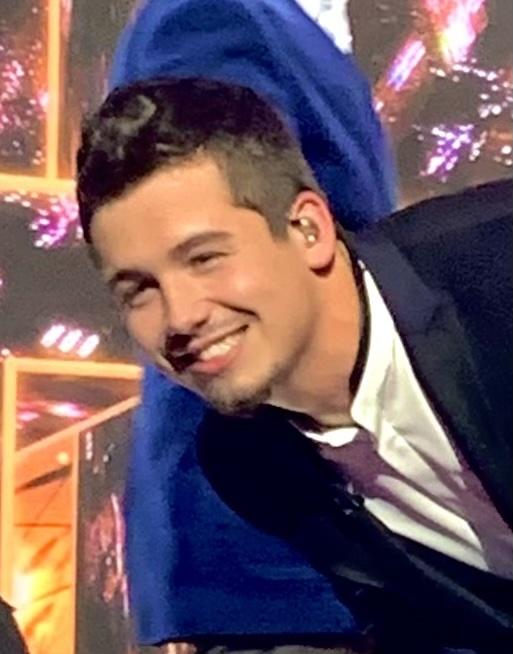
Noah Thompson, the twentieth season winner

On May 13, 2021, ABC renewed the series for a twentieth season and it premiered on February 27, 2022. Seacrest returned as host, and Bryan, Perry and Richie returned as judges. On December 31, it was announced that Bones would not be returning as a mentor. On May 22, the season concluded, with Noah Thompson crowned as the winner, with HunterGirl finishing as the runner-up and Leah Marlene in third place. "One Day Tonight", the song Noah Thompson performed for the Grand Finale, was released as his debut song.

=== Season 21 (2023) ===
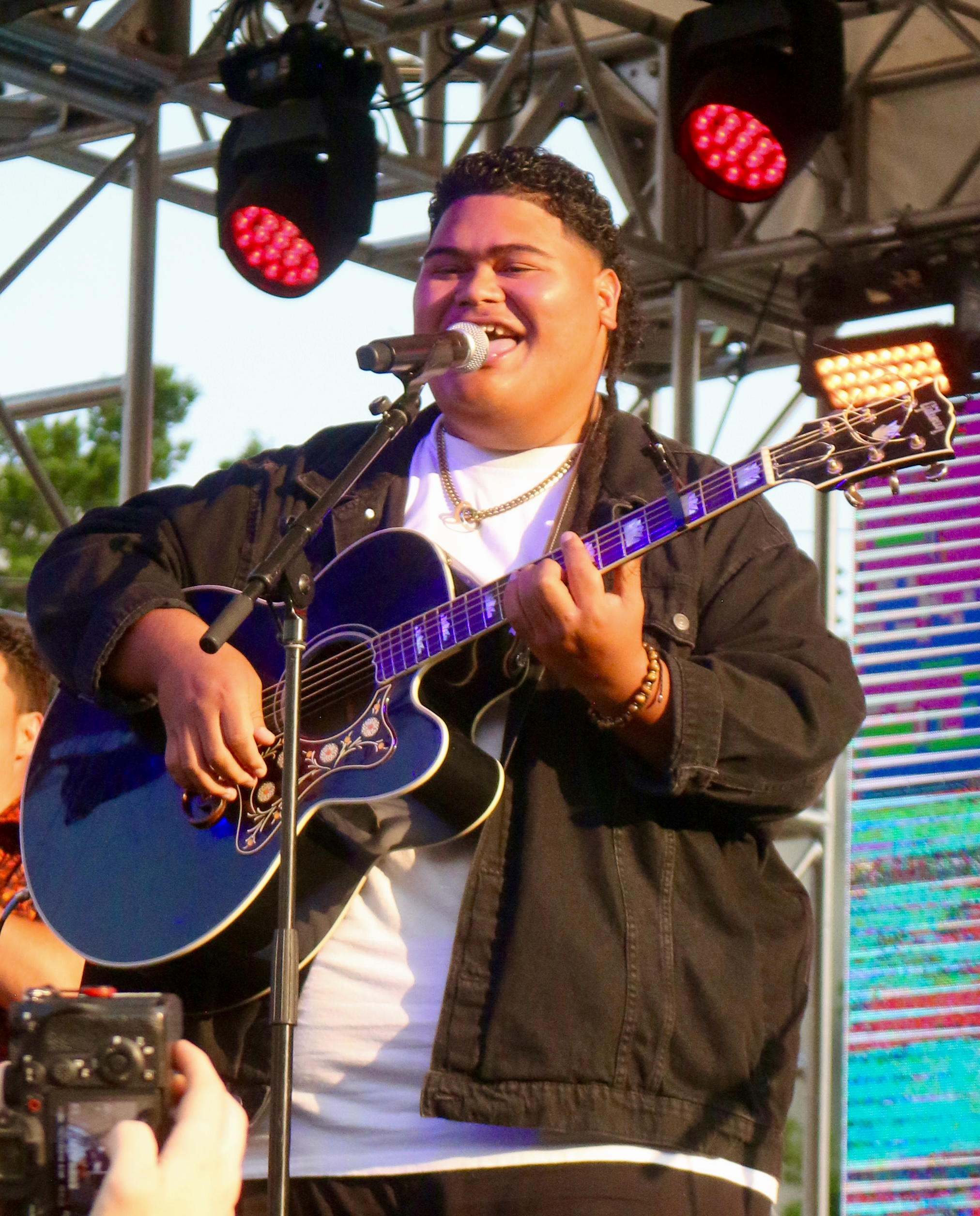
Iam Tongi, the twenty-first season winner

On May 13, 2022, ABC renewed the series for a twenty-first season and it premiered on February 19, 2023. Seacrest returned as host, and Bryan, Perry and Richie returned as judges. On May 21, the season concluded, with Iam Tongi crowned as the winner, with Megan Danielle finishing as the runner-up and Colin Stough placing third.

=== Season 22 (2024) ===
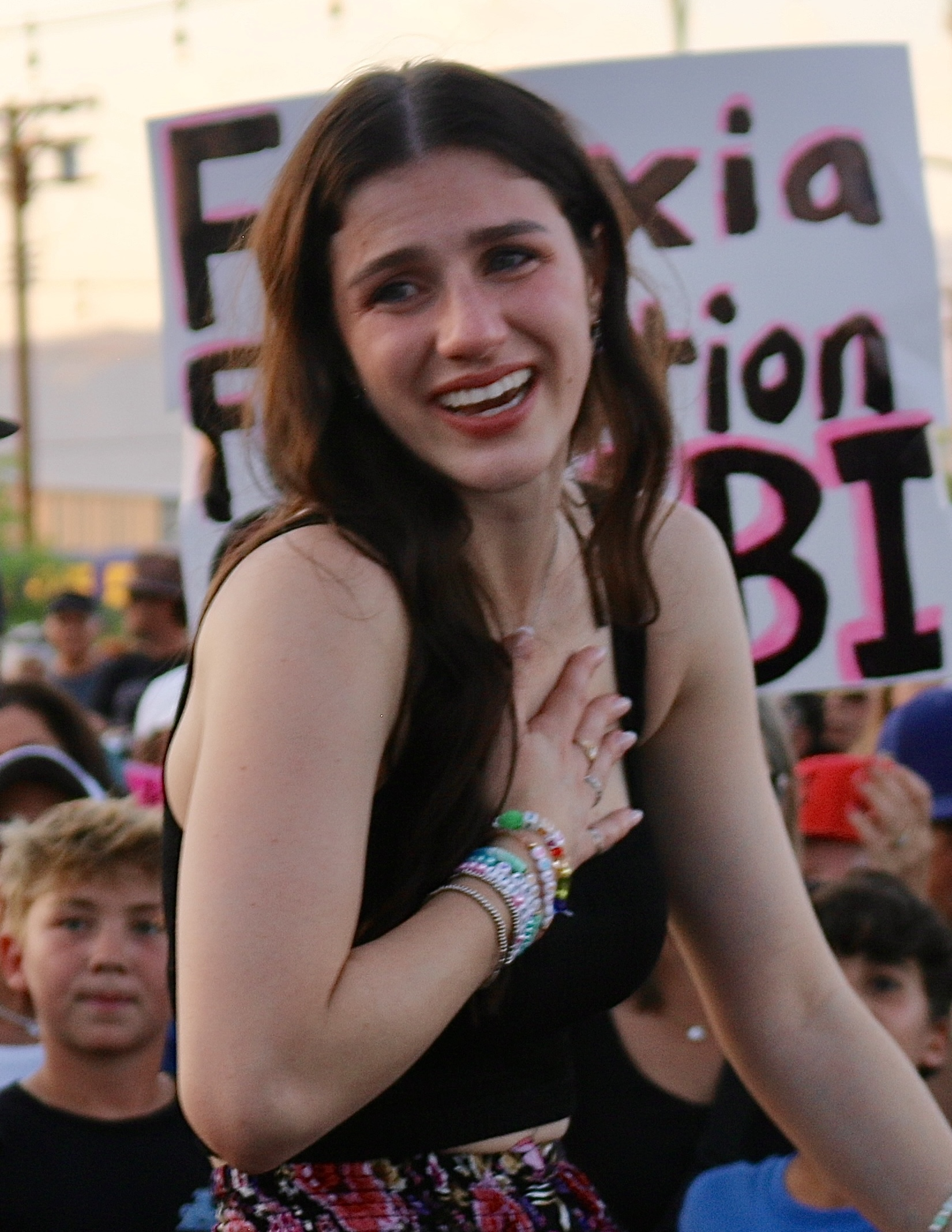
Abi Carter, the twenty-second season winner

On May 16, 2023, ABC renewed the series for a twenty-second season and it premiered on February 18, 2024. Seacrest returned as host, and Bryan, Perry and Richie returned as judges. In February 2024, Perry announced that the season would be her last. On May 19, the season concluded, with Abi Carter crowned as the winner, with Will Moseley finishing as the runner-up and Jack Blocker placing third.

=== Season 23 (2025) ===
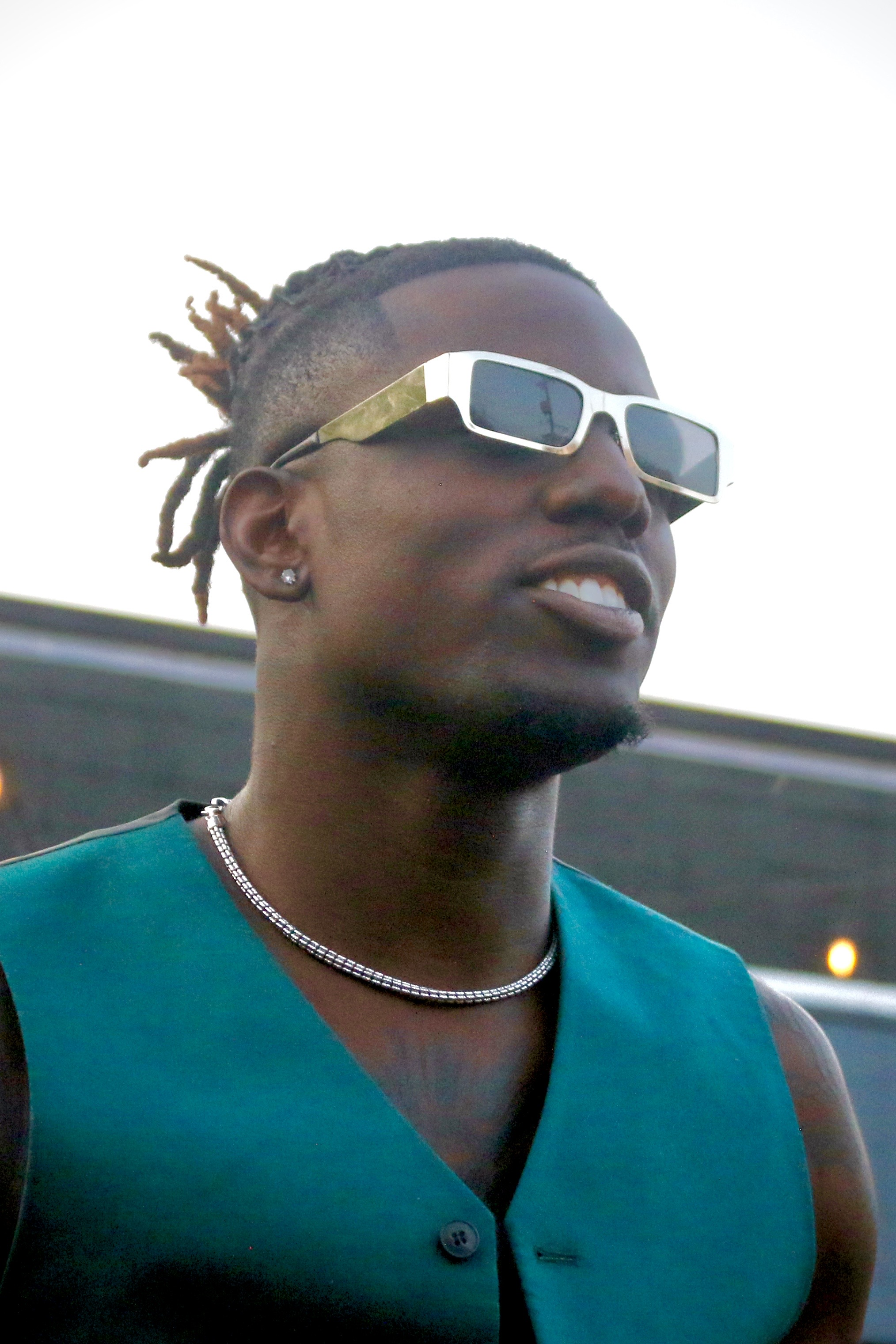
Jamal Roberts, the twenty-third season winner

On May 10, 2024, ABC renewed the series for a twenty-third season; it was also announced the network was in-talks with "high-profile stars" to replace the outgoing Perry. On July 31, 2024, it was announced Seacrest would return as host, with Bryan and Richie returning as judges; Underwood was named as Perry's successor. The season premiered on March 9, 2025. On May 18, the season concluded, with Jamal Roberts crowned as the winner, with John Foster finishing as the runner-up and Breanna Nix placing third.

=== Season 24 (2026) ===
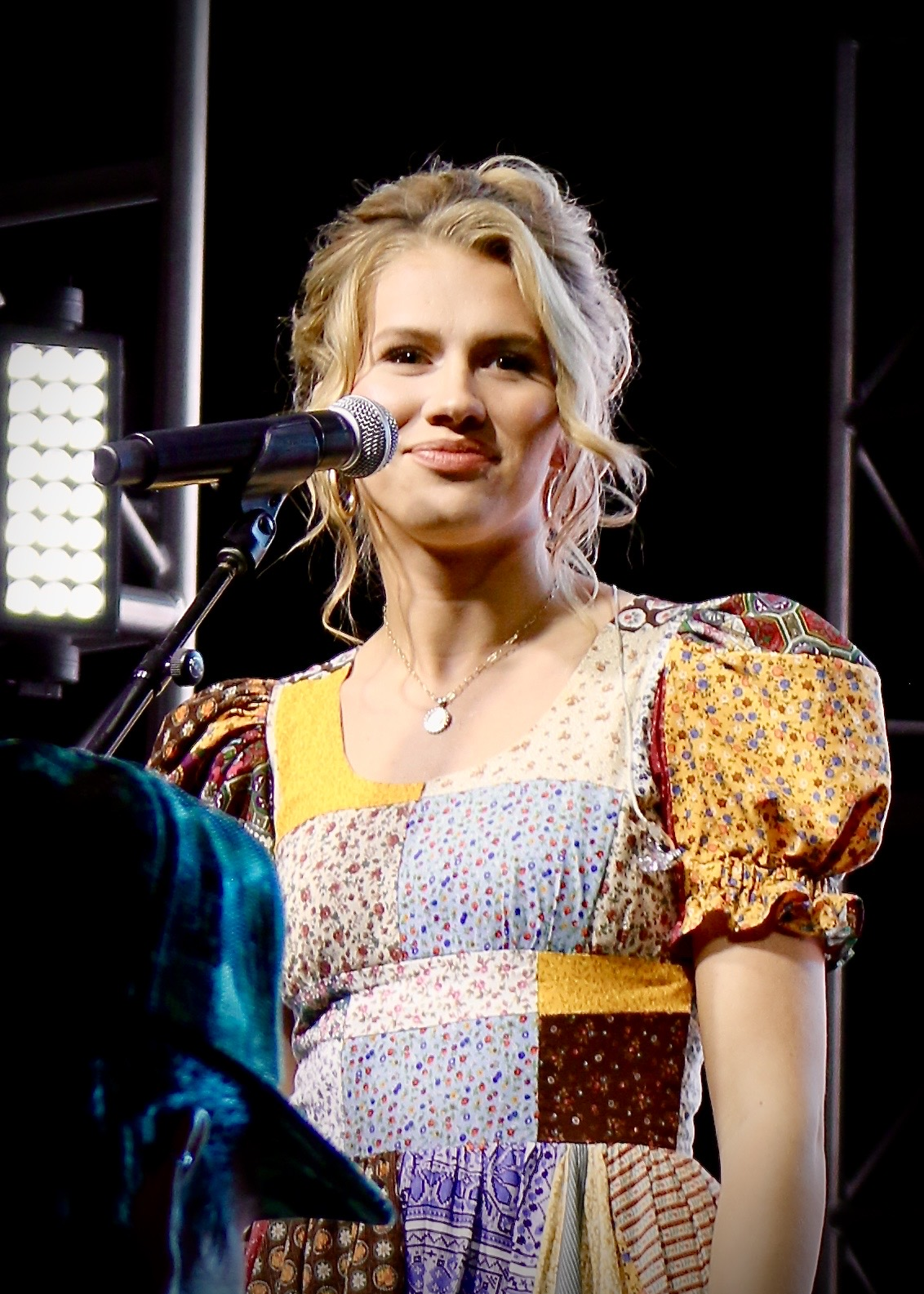
Hannah Harper, the twenty-fourth season winner

On May 9, 2025, it was announced the series had been renewed for a twenty-fourth season. Three months later, it was announced the season would premiere in January 2026, with Seacrest returning as host, and Bryan, Richie, and Underwood returning as judges; The twenty-fourth season premiered on January 26, 2026. On May 11, the season concluded, with Hannah Harper crowned as the winner, with Jordan McCullough finishing as the runner-up and Keyla Richardson placing third.

=== Season 25 (2027) ===
On July 29, 2026, it was announced that American Idol had been renewed for a twenty-fifth season, which is expected to premiere in spring 2027. On September 15, 2026, Fremantle confirmed to multiple sources that it will move production of American Idol to the Atlanta, Georgia area. On September 24, 2026, ABC confirmed that Seacrest will return as host and Bryan, Richie, and Underwood will return as judges.
