= MacKenzie Bourg =

American singer-songwriter (born 1992)

- Born: MacKenzie Richard Bourg; September 11, 1992 (age 33); Lafayette, Louisiana, U.S.
- Genres: Pop; acoustic; folk
- Occupations: Singer-songwriter; musician
- Instruments: Vocals; guitar; piano
- Years active: 2012–present

MacKenzie Richard Bourg (English: /bɜːr/; BER; born September 11, 1992) is an American singer-songwriter originally from Lafayette, Louisiana. He placed fourth in the fifteenth season of the reality show American Idol. Prior to appearing on American Idol, Bourg competed in the third season of The Voice.

== Biography ==
MacKenzie Bourg was born on September 11, 1992, the son of Rudy Bourg and Michelle Arceneaux. He attended St. Thomas More High School in Lafayette. He played basketball at school but had to quit the sport in his junior year after contracting a virus which triggered congestive heart failure, and had to be kept in an induced coma. After his recovery from his illness, he concentrated on music.

He was a contestant on the third season of The Voice where he was defaulted to CeeLo Green's team.

=== Later career ===
In 2016, Bourg auditioned for American Idol at Atlanta, Georgia performing a medley of songs by the judges. He sang his original song "Roses" for his final solo performance to advance to the Showcase round. Bourg advanced to the top 24 after he performed "Can't Help Falling in Love". He was eliminated out of the top 4 on March 31.

"Lost & Found" was released in December 2017.

== The Voice ==
=== Overview ===
==== Performances/results ====
Stage	Song	Original Artist	Date	Order	Result
Blind Audition	"Pumped Up Kicks"	Foster the People	September 11, 2012	2.9	Defaulted to Team CeeLo
Battle Rounds	"Good Time" (v.s. Emily Earle)	Owl City & Carly Rae Jepsen	October 16, 2012	13.6	Saved by Coach
Knockout Rounds	"Call Me Maybe" (v.s. Daniel Rosa)	Carly Rae Jepsen	October 29, 2012	16.7	Saved by Coach
Live Playoffs	"What Makes You Beautiful"	One Direction	November 7, 2012	19.5	Eliminated by Coach

== American Idol ==
=== Overview ===
MacKenzie auditioned for the fifteenth season of American Idol in Atlanta, Georgia. He performed a medley of songs for the judges, and was given a ticket to Hollywood. During both the Showcase Round and Top 14, he sang his original song "Roses", which was loved by the judges and fans at home.

He performed a duet with Lauren Alaina during night two of top 24, singing "I Hope You Dance." During top 6, he performed a duet with fellow contestant Dalton Rapattoni, singing "I Want It That Way."

After being in the bottom 2 with La'Porsha Renae, Bourg was eliminated on March 31.

==== Performances/results ====
Episode	Theme	Song choice	Original artist	Order #	Result
Audition	Auditioner's Choice	"Stupid Boy" / "Come by Me" / "Love Don't Cost a Thing" / "Making Memories of Us"	Keith Urban / Harry Connick, Jr. / Jennifer Lopez / Keith Urban	N/A	Advanced
Hollywood Round, Part 1	First Solo	Not aired		N/A	Advanced
Hollywood Round, Part 2	Group Performance	Quartet "Renegades" with Ashley Lilinoe, Kayla Mickelsen & Juno Rada	X Ambassadors	N/A	Advanced
Hollywood Round, Part 3	Second Solo	"Roses"	MacKenzie Bourg	N/A	Advanced
Final Judgment	Final Solo	"Can't Help Falling in Love"	Elvis Presley	N/A	Advanced
Top 24	Personal Choice	Solo "Say Something"	A Great Big World and Christina Aguilera	2	Wild Card
Top 24	Personal Choice	Duet "I Hope You Dance" with Lauren Alaina	Lee Ann Womack	7	Wild Card
Wild Card	Personal Choice	"Roses"	MacKenzie Bourg	10	Advanced
Top 10	Personal Choice	"I See Fire"	Ed Sheeran	7	Safe
Top 8	Idol Grammy Hits	"I Wanna Dance with Somebody (Who Loves Me)"	Whitney Houston	4	Safe
Top 6	American Idol All Time Song Book	Duet "I Want It That Way" with Dalton Rapattoni	Backstreet Boys	3	Safe
Top 6	American Idol All Time Song Book	Solo "You Are So Beautiful"	Billy Preston	6	Safe
Top 5	America's Twitter Song Choice	"Wild World"	Cat Stevens	4	Safe
Top 5	America's Twitter Song Choice	"Billie Jean"	Michael Jackson	7	Safe
Top 4	Classic Rock	"I Want You to Want Me"	Cheap Trick	2	Eliminated
Top 4	Sia	"Titanium"	David Guetta featuring Sia	6	Eliminated
Top 3 (Note: Bourg performed "Hallelujah" in the Hometown Dedication round, but did not advance to the Top 3.)	Hometown Dedication	"Hallelujah"	Leonard Cohen	N/A	N/A

== Post-Idol ==
Bourg released his single "Roses" in association with Big Machine Records on April 7.

== Discography ==
=== Singles ===
List of singles, with selected chart positions and certifications
Title	Year	Peak chart positions		Album
Title	Year	US Rock	US Rock Digital	Album
"Everyone's Got a Story"	2013	—	—	Non-album single
"Heartbeat"	2014	—	—	Non-album single
"Roses"	2016	13	4	Non-album single
"Little Moon"	2016	—	—	Non-album single
"Lost & Found"	2017	—	—	Non-album single
"Playlove"	2018	—	—	Non-album single
"See You For the Holidays"	2018	—	—	Non-album single
"Big"	2019	—	—	Non-album single
"—" denotes releases that did not chart or were not released in that territory.

=== The Voice releases ===
Title	Year	Peak chart positions	Album
Title	Year	US Pop Digital	Album
"Pumped Up Kicks"	2012	—	Non-album single
"Good Time"	2012	—	Non-album single
"Call Me Maybe"	2012	39	Non-album single
"What Makes You Beautiful"	2012	—	Non-album single
"—" denotes releases that did not chart or were not released in that territory.

=== American Idol releases ===
Title	Year	Album
"I Want You to Want Me"	2016	American Idol Top 5 Season 15
"Hallelujah"	2016	American Idol Top 5 Season 15

== Filmography ==
Television
Year	Title	Role	Notes
2012	The Voice (U.S. season 3)	Himself	Contestant
2016	American Idol (season 15)	Himself	Contestant
