= Dalton Rapattoni =

American singer

- Born: Dalton Louis Rapattoni; February 6, 1996 (age 30); Memphis, Tennessee, United States
- Origin: Sunnyvale, Texas; Dallas, Texas
- Genres: Alternative
- Occupations: Musician; singer; songwriter
- Instruments: Bass; drums; flute; guitar; piano; vocals
- Years active: 2010–present

Dalton Louis Rapattoni (born February 6, 1996) is an American singer from Dallas, Texas. In 2015, he auditioned for the fifteenth season of American Idol. On April 6, 2016, he finished the show in third place, behind La'Porsha Renae and Trent Harmon.

== Early life ==
Rapattoni was born in Memphis, Tennessee on February 6, 1996, to Kiva Jackson Rapattoni and Fran Rapattoni. When he was two years old, the family moved to Sunnyvale, Texas, where he was raised. He was diagnosed with bipolar disorder at the age of 9. After medications used to treat his condition caused seizures, he was withdrawn from school because of resulting absences.

He began to learn to play guitar at the age of 11, after his grandmother bought him lessons. When he was 12, he started attending the School of Rock in Dallas and also in Frisco, Texas. As a result of the School of Rock program, he formed a local band with friends that was called Fly Away Hero.

At age 14, he participated in a nationwide talent search for boy band members by completing an audition video in a local Dallas mall. He was selected as one of the five original members of the boy band IM5 and moved to Los Angeles as a result. After completing training, IM5 debuted in 2011. In March 2014, Dalton revealed that he had left IM5.

Since 2015, he has worked as a teacher at the School of Rock in Dallas and Rockwall.

== American Idol ==
In 2015, Rapattoni auditioned for the fifteenth season of American Idol. On April 6, 2016, he finished the show in third place. Rapattoni was eliminated before he could sing Simon Fuller's choice song, "Say Something," and his reprise of "Hopelessly Devoted to You".

=== Performances ===
Week	Theme	Song(s)	Original artist(s)	Result
Auditions	Contestant's choice	"The Phantom of the Opera"	Andrew Lloyd Webber	Advanced
Hollywood Week, Part 1	Lines of Ten	"California Dreamin'"	The Mamas and the Papas	Advanced
Hollywood Week, Part 2	Group Round	"Treasure"	Bruno Mars	Advanced
Hollywood Week, Part 3	First solo	"Hopelessly Devoted to You"	Olivia Newton-John	Advanced
Hollywood Week, Part 4	Second solo	"It's Gonna Be Me"	N'SYNC	Advanced
Top 24	Contestant's choice	"Rebel Yell"	Billy Idol	Safe
Top 24	Duet Round	"Higher Ground" (duet with Chris Daughtry)	Stevie Wonder	Safe
Top 10	Contestant's choice	"Hey There Delilah"	Plain White T's	Safe
Top 8	Idol Grammy Hits	"Radioactive"	Imagine Dragons	Safe
Top 6	American Idol All Time Song Book	"I Want It That Way" (duet with Mackenzie Bourg)	Backstreet Boys	Safe
Top 6	American Idol All Time Song Book	"Eleanor Rigby"	The Beatles	Safe
Top 5	America's Twitter Song Choice	"Numb"	Linkin Park	Bottom 2
Top 5	America's Twitter Song Choice	"The Sound of Silence"	Simon & Garfunkel	Bottom 2
Top 4	Classic Rock	"God Only Knows"	Beach Boys	Safe
Top 4	Sia	"Bird Set Free"	Sia	Safe
Top 3	Hometown Dedication	"Calling You"	Blue October	Eliminated
Top 3	Scott Borchetta's Choice	"Dancing in the Dark"	Bruce Springsteen	Eliminated
Top 3	Judges' Choice	"Everybody Wants to Rule the World"	Tears for Fears	Eliminated
Top 2 (Eliminated at Third Place)	Winner's single	"Strike a Match"	Dalton Rapattoni	N/A

== Music career ==
As part of his early training at the School of Rock, he formed a local band with friends called Fly Away Hero. They released two EPs and played various shows around Texas from 2010 to 2012.

Rapattoni was selected in 2011, as part of a nationwide talent search, to be a member of the boy band IM5, which was created by Perez Hilton, Jamie King, and Simon Fuller. He performed and recorded with the band through March 2014. He released the solo single "Stop" in May 2014.

Upon his departure, he reformed his old band Fly Away Hero with new members and released a new EP "Lost and Found" on January 6, 2015. The EP charted to number 17 on the Billboard Heatseekers.

Rapattoni chose to audition for the final season of American Idol in August 2015 and placed third. The song "Strike a Match" was released after his performance on American Idol, and based on just over a day of sales, it reached number 38 on Rock Digital Songs, number 25 on Alternative Digital Songs, and number 46 on Hot Rock Songs, with 6,000 copies sold.

After American Idol during the summer of 2016, Rapattoni moved to Austin, Texas, to begin working on his album at Orb Recording Studios with Matt Noveskey of Blue October at Orb Recording Studios.

On May 6, 2016, he announced the School of Rock Gives Back Tour, where he performed alongside School of Rock house bands throughout the United States and Canada, as well as held free meet and greets to thank those that voted for him in the Idol competition. After the School of Rock Gives Back Tour ended, he announced another tour: "The Inspired Attempt Tour". The Inspired Attempt traveled all around America, starting in Boston and ending in Arizona.

On October 14, Rapattoni released his first single "Turn to Stone." On December 9, 2016, he released a cover of John Lennon's "Happy Christmas" as a digital single. He continued to tour during the months of March and April 2017 with The Acoustic Attempt Tour. On April 21, 2017, Rapattoni announced a summer tour with The House On Cliff and singer Lauren Carnahan. His debut solo studio album, Nobodys Home was released on September 22, 2017.

In March 2022, Rapattoni formed the band King Honey Bee and on March 27, the band released their first single "Velvet Jacket".

== Discography ==
- Nobodys Home (2017)

=== with IM5 ===
- Don't Run Away feat. on Tyler James Williams track (2012)
- Touchdown Dance (2014)

=== with Fly Away Hero ===
- Fly Away Hero (2010)
- Now Boarding (2011)
- Lost and Found (2015)

=== Singles ===
List of singles, with selected chart positions and certifications
Title	Year	Peak chart positions	Album
Title	Year	US Rock	Album
"Stop"	2014		Non-album single
"Strike a Match"	2016	46	Non-album single
"Turn to Stone"	2016		Nobodys Home
"Happy Christmas"	2016		Non-album single
"Signs"	2017		Nobody's Home
"Heaven"	2017		Nobody's Home

=== American Idol releases ===
Title	Year	Album
"God Only Knows"	2016	American Idol Top 5 Season 15
"Dancing in the Dark"	2016	American Idol Top 5 Season 15
"Strike a Match"	2016	Strike a Match (American Idol Top 3 Season 15) - Single
