= Strike a Match =

"Strike A Match"

Single by Dalton Rapattoni
- Released: April 6, 2016
- Recorded: 2016
- Genre: Pop rock
- Length: 4:00
- Label: Big Machine Records, 19
- Songwriters: Nathan Barlowe, Chris Braide

Dalton Rapattoni singles chronology
"No prior singles"	"Strike A Match"

"Strike A Match" is the debut single by American Idol season fifteen third place finalist Dalton Rapattoni and is also his coronation song from the contest.

== Critical response ==
The song was described as "definitely a good fit for him". It was described as very upbeat and fast paced with an inspirational spirit to it that should do well for Rapattoni whether or not he had secured the title.

== Commercial performance ==
"Strike A Match" was released after his performance on American Idol, and based on just two days of sales, it reached No. 38 on Rock Digital Songs, No. 25 on Alternative Digital Songs, and Hot Rock Songs at No. 46, with 6,000 copies sold.

== Charts ==
Chart (2016)	Peak position
US Rock Digital Songs (Billboard)	38
US Alternative Digital Songs (Billboard)	25
US Hot Rock Songs (Billboard)	46
