= American Idol season 15 =

American Idol
- Season 15
- Logo of season 15
- Hosted by: Ryan Seacrest
- Judges: Harry Connick Jr.; Jennifer Lopez; Keith Urban
- Winner: Trent Harmon
- Runner-up: La'Porsha Renae
- Finals venue: Dolby Theatre
- No. of episodes: 24

Release
- Original network: Fox
- Original release: January 6 – April 7, 2016

Season chronology
- ← Previous; Season 14 Next → Season 16

The fifteenth season of American Idol, also branded as American Idol: The Farewell Season, premiered on the Fox television network on January 6, 2016. Ryan Seacrest continued as the host, while Harry Connick Jr., Jennifer Lopez, and Keith Urban returned as judges. Scott Borchetta also returned as the in-house mentor. On April 7, 2016, Trent Harmon was announced as this season's winner and La'Porsha Renae was the runner-up.

It was the series' final season to air on Fox. Despite the announcement that the series would be ending, ABC announced in May 2017 that they would revive American Idol.

== Changes from previous seasons ==
For the first time, performances by the top 24 were judged solely by the show's judges and producers, who determined which contestants were eliminated. From each group of twelve, seven were advanced and five were eliminated, resulting in a top 14 for the third week of the semifinals.

The voting limit for this season was set at ten votes per contestant per voting method, half of what it had been the previous season.

== Regional auditions ==
The American Idol "Audition Bus Tour" visited the following cities: Seattle; Providence, Rhode Island; Baltimore, Maryland; San Diego, California; Pittsburgh; Tucson, Arizona; Indianapolis, Indiana; Santa Fe, New Mexico; Athens, Georgia; Tulsa, Oklahoma; Oxford, Mississippi; and Wilmington, North Carolina. American Idol partnered with two technology companies to allow people to audition using video recording kiosks and mobile apps in Culver City, California, and Nashville.

Auditions took place in:

American Idol (season 15) – regional auditions
City	Preliminary date	Preliminary venue	Filming date(s)	Filming venue
Various cities	July 9–21, 2015	Varied	Unknown	
Denver, Colorado	July 10, 2015	Denver Coliseum	September 26–27, 2015	Colorado Convention Center
Savannah, Georgia	July 22, 2015	Martin Luther King Jr. Arena	September 13–14, 2015	W Midtown Hotel (Atlanta)
Philadelphia, Pennsylvania	August 2, 2015	Liacouras Center	August 15–16, 2015	Pennsylvania Convention Center
Little Rock, Arkansas	August 8, 2015	Verizon Arena	August 22–23, 2015	Statehouse Convention Center
San Francisco, California	September 15, 2015	Cow Palace	October 10–11, 2015	Westin St. Francis

== Semifinals ==
The top 24 semifinalists were split into two groups of twelve, and their performances were filmed at The Vibiana in Los Angeles. Each round consisted of back-to-back performances: each contestant sang one solo in the episode which aired on Wednesday, and one duet with an American Idol alumnus in the episode that aired on Thursday.

Color key:

This contestant was chosen by the public.
This contestant was chosen by the judges.
This contestant was chosen by the judges to compete in the Wild Card round.
This contestant was eliminated.

=== Top 24 (Group 1) ===
Contestants are listed in the order they performed.

Group 1 (February 10 & 11)
Contestant	Order (2/10)	Solo song	Order (2/11)	Duet song	Result
Stephany Negrete	1	"Mamma Knows Best"	3	"Superstar" (with Ruben Studdard)	Eliminated
MacKenzie Bourg	2	"Say Something"	7	"I Hope You Dance" (with Lauren Alaina)	Wild Card
Jeneve Rose Mitchell	3	"Angel"	11	"Gone" (with Scotty McCreery)	Wild Card
Jenna Renae	4	"My Church"	5	"See You Tonight" (with Scotty McCreery)	Eliminated
James VIII	5	"Love Lockdown"	10	"Gimme Shelter" (with Caleb Johnson)	Eliminated
Sonika Vaid	6	"Safe & Sound"	4	"Skyfall" (with Caleb Johnson)	Wild Card
Gianna Isabella	7	"I Put a Spell on You"	8	"Beautiful Life" (with Nick Fradiani)	Wild Card
Emily Brooke	8	"I Am Invincible"	1	"Flat on the Floor" (with Lauren Alaina)	Eliminated
Avalon Young	9	"Love Yourself"	9	"Flying Without Wings" (with Ruben Studdard)	Wild Card
Jordan Sasser	10	"All by Myself"	12	"I Believe" (with Fantasia)	Eliminated
Thomas Stringfellow	11	"Creep"	2	"Man in the Mirror" (with Nick Fradiani)	Wild Card
La'Porsha Renae	12	"Proud Mary"	6	"Summertime" (with Fantasia)	Advanced

=== Top 24 (Group 2) ===
Contestants are listed in the order they performed.

Group 2 (February 17 & 18)
Contestant	Order (2/17)	Solo song	Order (2/18)	Duet song	Result
Shelbie Z	1	"Work Hard, Play Harder"	12	"Bohemian Rhapsody" (with Constantine Maroulis)	Eliminated
Manny Torres	2	"Adventure of a Lifetime"	5	"No Air" (with Jordin Sparks)	Wild Card
Kory Wheeler	3	"Let It Go"	2	"Bennie and the Jets" (with Haley Reinhart)	Eliminated
Amelia Eisenhauer	4	"Wake Me Up"	1	"Suds in the Bucket" (with Kellie Pickler)	Eliminated
Jenn Blosil	5	"Sorry"	6	"My Funny Valentine" (with Constantine Maroulis)	Wild Card
C. J. Johnson	6	"I'll Be"	4	"The World I Know" (with David Cook)	Eliminated
Lee Jean	7	"Runaway"	3	"Home" (with Chris Daughtry)	Wild Card
Trent Harmon	8	"What Are You Listening To"	11	"To Love Somebody" (with Jordin Sparks)	Advanced
Tristan McIntosh	9	"Good Girl"	7	"Best Days of Your Life" (with Kellie Pickler)	Wild Card
Adam Lasher	10	"Black and Gold"	9	"Can't Help Falling in Love" (with Haley Reinhart)	Eliminated
Dalton Rapattoni	11	"Rebel Yell"	10	"Higher Ground" (with Chris Daughtry)	Advanced
Olivia Rox	12	"Confident"	8	"Light On" (with David Cook)	Advanced

=== Wild Card round ===
Following the judges' selection of four contestants to advance to the Finals, the remaining ten semifinalists competed for the viewers' votes. Six of them advanced to complete the final group of ten. Contestants are listed in the order they performed.

Wild Card round (February 24)
Contestant	Song	Result
Manny Torres	"Master Blaster (Jammin')"	Eliminated
Gianna Isabella	"I Put a Spell on You"	Advanced
Thomas Stringfellow	"Story of My Life"	Eliminated
Tristan McIntosh	"What Hurts the Most"	Advanced
Avalon Young	"Yo (Excuse Me Miss)"	Advanced
Jenn Blosil	"True Colors"	Eliminated
Lee Jean	"Make It Rain"	Advanced
Sonika Vaid	"I Surrender"	Advanced
Jeneve Rose Mitchell	"Ring of Fire"	Eliminated
MacKenzie Bourg	"Roses"	Advanced

== Top 10 finalists ==
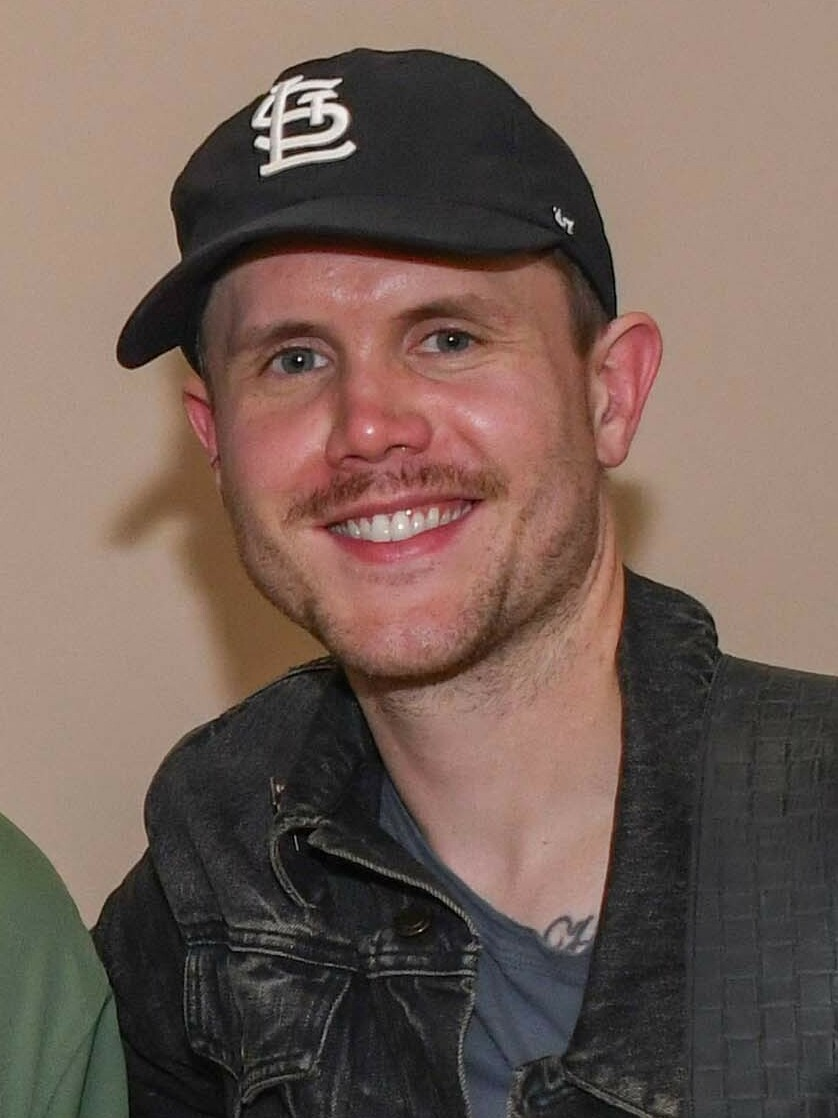
Trent Harmon

- Trent Harmon (born October 8, 1990) was from Amory, Mississippi. He auditioned in Little Rock, singing "Unaware" by Allen Stone. When Harmon suffered mononucleosis during Hollywood Week, he continued by singing Sam Smith's "Lay Me Down" as his first solo. In the group round, he was not able to perform with the other contestants due to his illness, and the producers allowed him to perform a solo to advance. He earned a spot in the top 24 during Showcase Week after performing Elton John's "Tiny Dancer."
- La'Porsha Renae (born August 1, 1993) was from McComb, Mississippi. She had previously auditioned during the eighth season. She auditioned in Little Rock with Radiohead's "Creep." In Hollywood, she performed Katy Perry's "Roar" as her first solo. She advanced to the top 24 after she sang "The House of the Rising Sun" during Showcase Week.
- Dalton Rapattoni (born February 6, 1996) was from Sunnyvale, Texas. He auditioned in Little Rock, with "The Phantom of the Opera." As his first solo in Hollywood, he sang "California Dreamin'" by The Mamas & the Papas. He sang Olivia Newton-John's "Hopelessly Devoted to You" as his final solo. He advanced to the Top 24 after he sang "It's Gonna Be Me" by NSYNC during Showcase Week.
- MacKenzie Bourg (born September 11, 1992) was from Lafayette, Louisiana. He auditioned at Atlanta by performing a medley of songs by the judges. He sang his original song, "Roses," as his final solo to advance to the Showcase round. He advanced to the top 24 after he performed "Can't Help Falling in Love".
- Sonika Vaid (born August 4, 1995) was originally from Weston, Massachusetts, but moved to Martha's Vineyard. She sang "Look at Me" by Carrie Underwood at her audition in Denver, and received high praise from the judges. She then progressed to the first round in Hollywood, where she sang "Almost Is Never Enough." As her final solo in Hollywood, she performed "One Last Time" by Ariana Grande. In the Showcase round, she performed "I Surrender" by Celine Dion and advanced to the Top 24.
- Tristan McIntosh (born April 25, 2000) was from Nashville, Tennessee. She auditioned in Little Rock, performing "Why Baby Why" by Mickey Guyton. In Hollywood, she sang "Something in the Water" by Carrie Underwood as her first solo. She advanced to the Showcase round after performing her final solo, "What Hurts the Most." She advanced to the top 24 after singing "Stronger" by Faith Hill.
- Lee Jean (born September 10, 1999) was from Bluffton, South Carolina. He auditioned in Atlanta, where he sang Ed Sheeran's "I See Fire." He sang "Stitches" by Shawn Mendes as his final solo. During Showcase week, he sang "Make It Rain" and earned a spot in the top 24.
- Avalon Young (born July 16, 1994) was from San Diego, California. She auditioned in San Francisco by performing an acoustic version of "XO" by Beyoncé. During the final round in Hollywood, she sang Ariana Grande's "One Last Time" and advanced in the Showcase Round. She sang "Yo (Excuse Me Miss)" by Chris Brown and advanced to the top 24 semifinals.
- Gianna Isabella (born March 30, 2000) was from Jackson, New Jersey. She auditioned in Philadelphia, where she sang "The House of the Rising Sun." She sang "One Night Only" as her first solo in Hollywood. She sang her mother's hit single. "I Still Believe," during Showcase Week and advanced to the top 24.
- Olivia Rox (born January 16, 1999) was from Agoura Hills, California. She auditioned in San Francisco, where she performed "When I Was Your Man" by Bruno Mars. She advanced in the first round in Hollywood by performing "Genie in a Bottle" by Christina Aguilera. She sang one of her original songs and advanced to Showcase Week. She advanced to the top 24 after she sang Maroon 5's "Love Somebody."

== Finals ==
There were seven weeks of finals with ten contestants competing. For the first three weeks, the judges had the ability to save one contestant amongst the bottom three or two, that resulted from America's votes based upon the previous week's performances. As of the Top 5, the results reverted back entirely to America's vote.

Color key:

This contestant was saved by America's vote.
This contestant was in the bottom two or three, but was saved by America's vote.
This contestant was eliminated.
This contestant was saved from elimination by the judges.
This contestant won American Idol.
This contestant was the runner-up.

=== Top 10 – Songs from 2002–present ===
Kelly Clarkson served as a guest judge this week. Contestants are listed in the order they performed.

Contestant	Song	Result
Olivia Rox	"Unconditionally"	Eliminated (Note: Rox's performance of "Unconditionally" did not earn enough public votes, and resulted in her Bottom 3 appearance. "Trouble" is what performance the judges based their decision upon, which led to her elimination.)
Gianna Isabella	"Listen"	Eliminated (Note: Isabella's performance of "Listen" did not earn enough public votes, and resulted in her Bottom 3 appearance. "If I Ain't Got You" is what performance the judges based their decision upon, which led to her elimination.)
Lee Jean	"Skinny Love"	Safe
Avalon Young	"Stitches"	Saved by the judges (Note: Young's performance of "Stitches" did not earn enough public votes, and resulted in her Bottom 3 appearance. "Earned It" is what performance the judges based their decision upon saving her. The following week, as a result of not earning enough public votes for "Earned It", her final performance of "P.Y.T. (Pretty Young Thing)" did not earn her a second consecutive save, and she was thusly eliminated.)
Dalton Rapattoni	"Hey There Delilah"	Safe
Tristan McIntosh	"Nothin' Like You"	Safe
MacKenzie Bourg	"I See Fire"	Safe
La'Porsha Renae	"Diamonds"	Safe
Sonika Vaid	"Bring Me to Life"	Safe
Trent Harmon	"Like I Can"	Safe

Non-competition performance
Performers	Song
Kelly Clarkson	"Piece by Piece"

=== Top 8 – Grammy hits ===
Avalon Young, Olivia Rox, and Gianna Isabella were in the Bottom 3 based on America's votes from the previous week's episode. Rox performed "Trouble" while Isabella performed "If I Ain't Got You". However, Young's performance of "Earned It" earned the judges' save amongst the three, and consequently, the other two were eliminated. Young's performance was nevertheless up for America's vote along with the other seven. Contestants are listed in the order they performed.

Contestant	Song	Result
Dalton Rapattoni	"Radioactive"	Safe
Lee Jean	"Use Somebody"	Eliminated (Note: Jean's performance of "Use Somebody" did not earn enough public votes, and resulted in his Bottom 3 appearance. "Let It Be" is what performance the judges based their decision upon, which led to his elimination.)
Sonika Vaid	"Since U Been Gone"	Saved by the judges (Note: Vaid's performance of "Since U Been Gone" did not earn enough public votes, and resulted in her Bottom 3 appearance. "I Have Nothing" is what performance the judges based their decision upon saving her. The following week, as a result of not earning enough public votes for "I Have Nothing", her next performance of "Let It Go" earned her a second—and the season's final—judges' save. However, this performance combined with her second performance that night, "Clarity", resulted in her elimination by public vote in fifth place, with no further allotted saves.)
MacKenzie Bourg	"I Wanna Dance with Somebody (Who Loves Me)"	Safe
La'Porsha Renae	"Halo"	Safe
Trent Harmon	"When a Man Loves a Woman"	Safe
Tristan McIntosh	"Go Rest High on That Mountain"	Safe
Avalon Young	"Earned It"	Eliminated

Non-competition performance
Performers	Song
Top 8 with Demi Lovato	"Confident"
Demi Lovato	"Stone Cold"
Harry Connick Jr.	"(I Do) Like We Do"

=== Top 6 – Popular songs of all time ===
Contestants performed two songs each: one duet with a fellow contestant, and one solo. Contestants are listed in the order they performed.

Avalon Young, Lee Jean, and Sonika Vaid were in the Bottom 3 based on America's votes from the previous week's episode. Duets were done before revealing the results from the previous week. Young performed "P.Y.T." while Jean performed "Let It Be". However, Vaid's performance of "I Have Nothing" earned the judges' save amongst the three, and consequently, the other two were eliminated. Vaid's performance was nevertheless up for America's vote along with the other five. Contestants are listed in the order they performed.

Contestant	Order	Song	Result
Trent Harmon & La'Porsha Renae	1	"See You Again"	
Sonika Vaid & Avalon Young	2	"Rise Up"	
MacKenzie Bourg & Dalton Rapattoni	3	"I Want It That Way"	
Lee Jean & Tristan McIntosh	4	"I Don't Want to Miss a Thing"	
La'Porsha Renae	5	"Come Together"	Safe
MacKenzie Bourg	6	"You Are So Beautiful"	Safe
Trent Harmon	7	"Stand by Me"	Safe
Tristan McIntosh	8	"A Broken Wing"	Eliminated (Note: McIntosh's performance of "A Broken Wing" did not earn enough public votes, and resulted in her Bottom 2 appearance. "Independence Day" is what performance the judges based their decision upon, which led to her elimination.)
Dalton Rapattoni	9	"Eleanor Rigby"	Safe
Sonika Vaid	10	"I Have Nothing"	Saved by the judges

Non-competition performance
Performers	Song
Nick Fradiani	"Get You Home"

=== Top 5 – America's song choice ===
Contestants performed two songs each, one of which was chosen by the voters on Twitter. Contestants are listed in the order they performed.

Tristan McIntosh and Sonika Vaid were in the Bottom 2 based on America's votes from the previous week's episode. McIntosh performed "Independence Day". However, Vaid's performance of "Let It Go" earned the judges' final opportunity to rescue a contestant, and consequently, McIntosh was eliminated midway through the show, prior to singing a second song. Vaid's performances were nevertheless up for America's vote along with the other four.

Contestant	Order	Song	Result
Trent Harmon	1	"Counting Stars" (Note: Song chosen by the voters on Twitter.)	Safe
Trent Harmon	8	"Simple Man"	Safe
Dalton Rapattoni	2	"Numb"	Bottom two
Dalton Rapattoni	6	"The Sound of Silence"	Bottom two
La'Porsha Renae	3	"Ready for Love"	Safe
La'Porsha Renae	10	"No More Drama"	Safe
MacKenzie Bourg	4	"Wild World"	Safe
MacKenzie Bourg	7	"Billie Jean"	Safe
Sonika Vaid	5	"Let It Go"	Eliminated
Sonika Vaid	9	"Clarity"	Eliminated

Non-competition performance
Performers	Song
Adam Lambert	"Mad World"
Jussie Smollett and Yazz The Greatest	"Never Let It Die"
Adam Lambert, featuring Laleh	"Welcome to the Show"

=== Top 4 – Classic rock & Sia ===
Sia and Stevie Van Zandt served as guest mentors this week. Contestants performed two songs: a classic rock song and a song from Sia's discography. Contestants are listed in the order they performed.

In a deviation from other weeks, Sonika Vaid did not perform before she was eliminated, based on the previous week's votes.

Contestant	Order	Song	Result
La'Porsha Renae	1	"Wanted Dead or Alive"	Bottom two
La'Porsha Renae	5	"Elastic Heart"	Bottom two
MacKenzie Bourg	2	"I Want You to Want Me"	Eliminated
MacKenzie Bourg	6	"Titanium"	Eliminated
Trent Harmon	3	"Sharp Dressed Man"	Safe
Trent Harmon	7	"Chandelier"	Safe
Dalton Rapattoni	4	"God Only Knows"	Safe
Dalton Rapattoni	8	"Bird Set Free"	Safe

Non-competition performance
Performers	Song
David Cook	"Heartbeat"
Katharine McPhee	"Over the Rainbow"
Sia	"Cheap Thrills"

=== Top 3 ===
Each contestant performed three songs: one dedicated to the finalists' hometowns, one chosen by mentor Scott Borchetta, and one chosen by the judges. Contestants are listed in the order they performed.

MacKenzie Bourg performed "Hallelujah," but was eliminated based on the previous week's votes.

Contestant	Order	Song	Result
Dalton Rapattoni	1	"Calling You"	Eliminated
Dalton Rapattoni	4	"Dancing in the Dark" (Note: Song chosen by Scott Borchetta.)	Eliminated
Dalton Rapattoni	7	"Everybody Wants to Rule the World"	Eliminated
Trent Harmon	2	"Tennessee Whiskey"	Safe
Trent Harmon	6	"Drink You Away"	Safe
Trent Harmon	9	"Waiting Game"	Safe
La'Porsha Renae	3	"Glory"	Safe
La'Porsha Renae	5	"Stay with Me"	Safe
La'Porsha Renae	8	"Hello"	Safe

Non-competition performance
Performers	Song
Keith Urban	"Wasted Time"

=== Top 2 – Finale ===
Each contestant performed three songs, one of which was chosen by producer Simon Fuller, and are listed in the order they performed.

This episode is notable for the return of Brian Dunkleman for one more episode.

Dalton Rapattoni performed "Strike A Match," but was eliminated based on the previous week's votes.

Contestant	Order	Song	Result
Trent Harmon	1	"Falling"	Winner
Trent Harmon	3	"If You Don't Know Me by Now" (Note: Song chosen by Simon Fuller.)	Winner
Trent Harmon	5	"Chandelier"	Winner
La'Porsha Renae	2	"Battles"	Runner-up
La'Porsha Renae	4	"A House Is Not a Home"	Runner-up
La'Porsha Renae	6	"Diamonds"	Runner-up

Non-competition performance
Performers	Song
Top 10	"Stole the Show"
Top 10 with American Idol alumni^{H}	"One Voice"
Trent Harmon and La'Porsha Renae	"It Takes Two"
Kara DioGuardi with Tamyra Gray and Jordin Sparks	"Sober"
Colton Dixon	"Through All of It"
Jordin Sparks and Justin Guarini	"No Air"
Kimberley Locke with Allison Iraheta and Jordin Sparks	"8th World Wonder"
Tamyra Gray with Allison Iraheta, Justin Guarini, and Jordin Sparks	"Girl Crush"
Allison Iraheta and Larry Platt with Tamyra Gray, Kimberley Locke, Jordin Sparks, and Pia Toscano	"No" "Pants on the Ground"
Pia Toscano with Colton Dixon, Tamyra Gray, Justin Guarini, Allison Iraheta, Kimberley Locke & Jordin Sparks	"All by Myself"
Kelly Clarkson	"Miss Independent" "Breakaway" "Since U Been Gone" "Because of You" "Behind These Hazel Eyes" "My Life Would Suck Without You" "Don't You Wanna Stay" "Stronger (What Doesn't Kill You)" "Heartbeat Song" "Invincible" "A Moment Like This"
Bo Bice with James Durbin, Caleb Singer, and Constantine Maroulis	"Vehicle"
James Durbin, Caleb Johnson and Constantine Maroulis	"Hard to Handle"
Chris Daughtry with Bo Bice, James Durbin, Caleb Johnson, and Constantine Maroulis	"Torches"
Bo Bice, Chris Daughtry, James Durbin, Caleb Johnson, and Constantine Maroulis	"Tobacco Road"
Carrie Underwood and Keith Urban	"Stop Draggin' My Heart Around"
Diana DeGarmo, Kree Harrison, and Skylar Laine with Bucky Covington, Constantine Maroulis, and Ace Young	"You Belong with Me"
Bucky Covington, Constantine Maroulis, and Ace Young with Diana DeGarmo, Kree Harrison, and Skylar Laine	"Storm Warning"
Lauren Alaina and Kellie Pickler with Bucky Covington, Diana DeGarmo, Kree Harrison, Skylar Laine, Constantine Maroulis, and Ace Young	"Done"
Scotty McCreery with Lauren Alaina, Bucky Covington, Diana DeGarmo, Kree Harrison, Skylar Laine, Constantine Maroulis, Kellie Pickler, and Ace Young	"Papa Loved Mama"
Lauren Alaina, Bucky Covington, Diana DeGarmo, Kree Harrison, Skylar Laine, Constantine Maroulis, Scotty McCreery, Kellie Pickler, and Ace Young	"Pavement Ends"
Harry Connick Jr. and Marley Fletcher	"What a Wonderful World"
Casey James and Katharine McPhee	"Need You Now"
Carly Smithson	"Here You Come Again"
Clay Aiken	"Annie's Song"
Amber Holcomb and Ruben Studdard	"Here, There and Everywhere"
Jessica Sanchez	"The Prayer"
Jennifer Lopez	"Ain't Your Mama" "Let's Get Loud"
Fantasia, Jennifer Hudson, and LaToya London	"Bridge over Troubled Water"
Jennifer Hudson	"Remember the Music"
Clark Beckham, Danny Gokey, George Huff, Brandon Rogers, and Elliott Yamin	"Ain't Too Proud to Beg"
Fantasia	"Ugly"
Taylor Hicks and LaToya London with Clark Beckham, Melinda Doolittle, Candice Glover, Mikalah Gordon, Danny Gokey, George Huff, Joshua Ledet, Brandon Rogers, and Elliott Yamin	"I Knew You Were Waiting (For Me)"
Joshua Ledet	"It's a Man's Man's Man's World"
Melinda Doolittle and Candice Glover with Clark Beckham, James Durbin, Danny Gokey, Mikalah Gordon, Taylor Hicks, George Huff, Joshua Ledet, Blake Lewis, Kimberley Locke, Brandon Rogers, Jordin Sparks, Elliott Yamin, and American Idol Top 10	"Joy to the World"
Kris Allen, David Cook, Lee DeWyze, Nick Fradiani, and Phillip Phillips	"Starman" "Rebel Rebel" "The Jean Genie"
William Hung	"She Bangs"
Carrie Underwood	"Something in the Water"
Trent Harmon	"Falling"

^H Carrie Underwood, Clay Aiken, David Cook, Elliott Yamin, Fantasia Barrino, Jennifer Hudson, Justin Guardini, Kelly Clarkson, Kimberley Locke, LaToya London and Nick Fradini were not a part of this group performance.

== Elimination chart ==
Color key:

Winner
Runner-up
Did not perform
Saved by the public
Saved by the judges
Wild Card
Bottom two
Eliminated

American Idol (season 15) - Eliminations
Contestant	Pl.	Semifinals		Wild Card	Top 10	Top 8	Top 6	Top 5	Top 4	Top 3	Finale
Contestant	Pl.	2/11	2/18	2/25	3/3	3/10	3/17	3/24	3/31	4/6	4/7
Trent Harmon	1	N/A	Safe	N/A	Safe	Safe	Safe	Safe	Safe	Safe	Winner
La'Porsha Renae	2	Safe	N/A	N/A	Safe	Safe	Safe	Safe	Bottom two	Safe	Runner-up
Dalton Rapattoni	3	N/A	Safe	N/A	Safe	Safe	Safe	Bottom two	Safe	Eliminated	
MacKenzie Bourg	4	Wild Card	N/A	Saved	Safe	Safe	Safe	Safe	Eliminated		
Sonika Vaid	5	Wild Card	N/A	Saved	Safe	Saved	Saved	Eliminated			
Tristan McIntosh	6	N/A	Wild Card	Saved	Safe	Safe	Eliminated				
Lee Jean	7	N/A	Wild Card	Saved	Safe	Eliminated					
Avalon Young	7	N/A	Wild Card	Saved	Saved	Eliminated					
Gianna Isabella	9	Wild Card	N/A	Saved	Eliminated						
Olivia Rox	9	N/A	Safe	N/A	Eliminated						
Jenn Blosil		N/A	Wild Card	Eliminated							
Jeneve Rose Mitchell		Wild Card	N/A	Eliminated							
Thomas Stringfellow		Wild Card	N/A	Eliminated							
Manny Torres		N/A	Wild Card	Eliminated							
Amelia Eisenhauer		N/A	Eliminated								
C.J. Johnson		N/A	Eliminated								
Adam Lasher		N/A	Eliminated								
Kory Wheeler		N/A	Eliminated								
Shelbie Z		N/A	Eliminated								
James VIII		Eliminated									
Emily Brooke		Eliminated									
Stephany Negrete		Eliminated									
Jenna Renae		Eliminated									
Jordan Sasser		Eliminated									

== Reception ==
=== U.S. Nielsen ratings ===
Live + same day ratings

The fifteenth season premiered to 10.96 million viewers, the second lowest since the series premiere. It received an all-time-low 3.0/9 18–49 rating, down 9% from last season. The season finale however had 13.30 million viewers, 5 million more than the fourteenth season finale.

No.	Episode	Air date	Timeslot	Rating/Share (18–49)		Viewers (millions)	Nightly rank	Weekly rank	Ref.
1	"Denver & Atlanta Auditions"	January 6, 2016	Wednesday 8:00 p.m.	3.0	9	10.96	1	5	
2	"Little Rock & San Francisco Auditions"	January 7, 2016	Thursday 8:00 p.m.	2.7	9	10.21	2	7	
3	"Philadelphia Auditions"	January 13, 2016	Wednesday 8:00 p.m.	2.5	8	9.77	2	5	
4	"Denver & Little Rock Auditions"	January 14, 2016	Thursday 8:00 p.m.	2.2	7	8.72	2	6	
5	"Atlanta, Little Rock, Philadelphia and San Francisco Auditions"	January 20, 2016	Wednesday 8:00 p.m.	2.4	8	9.22	1	4	
6	"Atlanta, Philadelphia and San Francisco Auditions"	January 21, 2016	Thursday 8:00 p.m.	2.4	8	9.36	1	4	
7	"Hollywood Week: Lines of Ten"	January 27, 2016	Wednesday 8:00 p.m.	2.5	8	9.63	1	3	
8	"Hollywood Week: Group Rounds"	January 28, 2016	Thursday 8:00 p.m.	2.3	8	8.77	1	5	
9	"Hollywood Week: Solo Round"	February 3, 2016	Wednesday 8:00 p.m.	2.3	8	9.18	1	7	
10	"Final Judgement"	February 4, 2016	Thursday 8:00 p.m.	2.2	7	8.94	2	9	
11	"Semi-Final #1: 1st 12 Solo Performances"	February 10, 2016	Wednesday 8:00 p.m.	2.2	7	9.16	1	7	
12	"Semi-Final #2: 1st 12 Duets & Judges' Vote"	February 11, 2016	Thursday 8:00 p.m.	2.1	7	8.96	3	9	
13	"Semi-Final #3: 2nd 12 Solo Performances"	February 17, 2016	Wednesday 8:00 p.m.	2.0	7	8.29	2	9	
14	"Semi-Final #4: 2nd 12 Duets & Judges' Vote"	February 18, 2016	Thursday 8:00 p.m.	2.0	7	8.19	4	9	
15	"Wild Card Night"	February 24, 2016	Wednesday 8:00 p.m.	2.1	7	8.92	2	10	
16	"Top 10 Perform: Contestants' Choice"	February 25, 2016	Thursday 8:00 p.m.	2.1	7	8.72	2	10	
17	"Top 8 Perform: Grammy Hits"	March 3, 2016	Thursday 8:00 p.m.	2.0	7	8.74	2	8	
18	"Top 6 Perform: American Idol Songbook"	March 10, 2016	Thursday 8:00 p.m.	1.8	6	8.06	3	11	
19	"Top 5 Perform: America's Choice"	March 17, 2016	Thursday 8:00 p.m.	1.7	6	8.22	2	17	
20	"Top 4 Perform: Sia & classic rock songs"	March 24, 2016	Thursday 8:00 p.m.	1.7	6	8.02	3	18	
21	"Top 3 Perform: Hometown Dedication"	March 31, 2016	Thursday 8:00 p.m.	2.1	7	9.11	3	7	
22	"American Dream"	April 5, 2016	Tuesday 8:00 p.m.	1.4	5	5.98	4	23	
23	"Top 2 Perform"	April 6, 2016	Wednesday 8:00 p.m.	2.2	8	9.70	3	6	
24	"Series Finale"	April 7, 2016	Thursday 8:00 p.m.	3.0	10	13.30	2	3	

Live + 7 day (DVR) ratings

No.	Episode	Air date	Timeslot	DVR 18–49	DVR viewers (millions)	Total 18–49	Total viewers (millions)	Ref.
1	"Denver & Atlanta Auditions"	January 6, 2016	Wednesday 8:00 p.m.	0.7	2.28	3.7	13.25	
2	"Little Rock & San Francisco Auditions"	January 7, 2016	Thursday 8:00 p.m.	0.8	2.24	3.5	12.45	
3	"Philadelphia Auditions"	January 13, 2016	Wednesday 8:00 p.m.	0.7	1.84	3.2	11.61	
4	"Denver & Little Rock Auditions"	January 14, 2016	Thursday 8:00 p.m.	0.7	2.05	2.9	10.77	
5	"Auditions No. 5"	January 20, 2016	Wednesday 8:00 p.m.	0.7	1.51	3.1	10.73	
6	"Auditions No. 6"	January 21, 2016	Thursday 8:00 p.m.	0.7	2.05	3.1	11.42	
7	"Hollywood Week: Lines of Ten"	January 27, 2016	Wednesday 8:00 p.m.	0.6	1.88	3.1	11.50	
8	"Hollywood Week: Group Rounds"	January 28, 2016	Thursday 8:00 p.m.	0.7	2.23	3.0	11.01	
9	"Hollywood Week: Solo Round"	February 3, 2016	Wednesday 8:00 p.m.	0.7	2.04	3.0	11.21	
10	"Final Judgement"	February 4, 2016	Thursday 8:00 p.m.	0.7	2.04	2.9	10.98	
11	"Semi-Final #1: 1st 12 Performances"	February 10, 2016	Wednesday 8:00 p.m.	0.5	1.55	2.7	10.71	
12	"Semi-Final #2: Judge's Vote"	February 11, 2016	Thursday 8:00 p.m.	0.4	1.48	2.5	10.44	
13	"Semi-Final #3: 2nd 12 Performances"	February 17, 2016	Wednesday 8:00 p.m.	0.5	1.47	2.5	9.76	
14	"Semi-Final #4: Judge's Vote"	February 18, 2016	Thursday 8:00 p.m.	0.4	1.57	2.4	9.76	
15	"Top 10 Wild Card Round"	February 24, 2016	Wednesday 8:00 p.m.	0.5	1.30	2.6	10.22	
16	"Top 10 Perform"	February 25, 2016	Thursday 8:00 p.m.	0.5	1.73	2.6	10.45	
17	"Top 8 Perform: Grammy Hits"	March 3, 2016	Thursday 8:00 p.m.	0.4	1.63	2.4	10.37	
18	"Top 6 Perform: American Idol Songbook"	March 10, 2016	Thursday 8:00 p.m.	0.5	2.02	2.3	10.08	
19	"Top 5 Perform: America's Choice"	March 17, 2016	Thursday 8:00 p.m.	0.5	1.66	2.2	9.89	
20	"Top 4 Perform: Sia & classic rock songs"	March 24, 2016	Thursday 8:00 p.m.	0.4	1.24	2.1	9.26	
21	"Top 3 Perform: Hometown Dedication"	March 31, 2016	Thursday 8:00 p.m.	0.4	1.50	2.5	10.61	
22	"American Dream"	April 5, 2016	Tuesday 8:00 p.m.	0.4	—	1.8	—	
23	"Top 2 Perform"	April 6, 2016	Wednesday 8:00 p.m.	0.4	1.53	2.6	11.23	
24	"Series Finale"	April 7, 2016	Thursday 8:00 p.m.	0.5	1.57	3.5	14.87	

== See also ==
- Music releases
