= Battles (La'Porsha Renae song) =

Single by La'Porsha Renae
- Released: April 6, 2016
- Recorded: 2016
- Genre: Pop
- Length: 3:41
- Label: Big Machine Records, 19
- Songwriter(s): Who Is Fancy

"Battles" is the debut single by American Idol season fifteen runner-up La'Porsha Renae and would have been her coronation song had she won the contest.

== Background ==
"Battles" was written by Who Is Fancy, who wrote it as a tribute to the passing of G.R.L. singer and X Factor finalist Simone Battle. Battle and Who Is Fancy were roommates when she died.

== Critical response ==
"Battles" was described as anthem-like and upbeat, if a bit poppier than we're used to hearing from the passionate, soulful vocalist.

== Commercial performance ==
"Battles" debuted on the iTunes Top 100 chart on April 6, 2016 a day ahead of the Grand Final performance show. After Renae's debut performance of the song the next day, it climbed up the charts reaching the Top 15. However, the single charted noticeably lower than the other finalists. The single also peaked at number 11 on the iTunes Top 100 pop songs chart. It reached No. 22 on the R&B Digital Songs chart, selling 7,000 copies based on just two days of sales.

== Chart performance ==
| Chart (2016) | Peak position |
|---|---|
| US R&B Digital Songs (Billboard) | 22 |
