= Roses (MacKenzie Bourg song) =

Single by MacKenzie Bourg
- Released: April 6, 2016
- Recorded: 2016
- Genre: Pop
- Length: 4:36
- Label: Big Machine Records, 19
- Songwriter(s): MacKenzie Bourg

MacKenzie Bourg singles chronology
"Heartbeat" (2014)	"Roses" (2016)	"Little Moon" (2016)

"Roses" is the first major-label single by American Idol season fifteen fourth-place finisher MacKenzie Bourg. The song was written by Bourg.

== Background ==
The song was written by Bourg. He performed the song American Idol initially in the Hollywood round, later again in the Wild Card round. The song was planned to be his coronation song should he win, the first time ever an original song by a contestant would have been used as the coronation song. Bourg however went out in fourth place, and the song was used in the send-off video package. "Roses" was released to the general public prior to the series finale through Big Machine Records.

== Commercial performance ==
"Roses" peaked on the iTunes Top Songs chart at number 3. The song was initially performed on season fifteen. The single also peaked at number 1 on the iTunes singer-songwriter chart. The song also charted in Canada, Philippines, New Zealand and Australia's iTunes's Top 100 chart. The song debuted on the Hot Rock Songs chart at No. 13 based on two days of sales. "Roses" had sold 22,000 copies in its first week. Bourg scores the best ranking on either chart for an Idol contestant since season 11 winner Phillip Phillips' coronation single "Home" spent five weeks at No. 1 on Rock Digital Songs and reached No. 2 on Hot Rock Songs in 2012.

== Charts ==
Chart (2016)	Peak position
US Billboard Hot Rock Songs	13
US Billboard Rock Digital Songs	4
