= La'Porsha Renae =

American singer-songwriter

- Also known as: A.S.E.
- Born: La'Porsha Renae Mays; August 1, 1993 (age 32); McComb, Mississippi, U.S.
- Genres: Soul; R&B
- Occupation: Singer
- Instrument: Vocals
- Years active: 2016–present
- Labels: Motown; Big Machine; 19; Man of Yah Productions

La'Porsha Renae Mays, known professionally as La'Porsha Renae, (born August 1, 1993) is an American singer-songwriter from McComb, Mississippi. In 2015 she auditioned for the fifteenth season of American Idol, which at that time was the final season. On April 7, 2016, she finished as runner-up on the show, behind winner Trent Harmon. In March 2017, Renae released her debut album Already All Ready.

== Biography ==
=== Early life ===
La'Porsha Renae Mays was born on August 1, 1993, in McComb, Mississippi. At age 16, Renae auditioned for the tenth season of American Idol. After graduating from college at age 22, Renae was a victim of domestic abuse. After a year, she separated from her husband and moved back to McComb with her one-month-old daughter Nayalee Keya.

== American Idol ==
Accompanied by her daughter, she returned to audition for the fifteenth season of American Idol in Little Rock, Arkansas and earned her golden ticket by performing in front of the judges with Radiohead's "Creep". Renae was announced as the runner-up on April 7, 2016.

=== Performances ===
Week	Theme	Song(s)	Original artist(s)	Result
Auditions	Contestant's choice	"Creep"	Radiohead	Advanced
Hollywood Week, Part 1	First Solo	"Roar"	Katy Perry	Advanced
Hollywood Week, Part 2	Group Round	"Stayin' Alive"	Bee Gees	Advanced
Hollywood Week, Part 3	Second Solo	Not aired		Advanced
Final Judgment	Final Solo	"The House of the Rising Sun"	The Animals	Advanced
Top 24	Contestant's choice	"Proud Mary"	Creedence Clearwater Revival	Advanced
Top 10	Contestant's choice	"Diamonds"	Rihanna	Safe
Top 8	Idol Grammy Hits	"Halo"	Beyoncé	Safe
Top 6	American Idol All Time Song Book	"See You Again" (duet with Trent Harmon)	Wiz Khalifa and Charlie Puth	Safe
Top 6	American Idol All Time Song Book	"Come Together"	The Beatles	Safe
Top 5	America's Twitter Song Choice	"Ready for Love"	India.Arie	Safe
Top 5	America's Twitter Song Choice	"No More Drama"	Mary J. Blige	Safe
Top 4	Classic Rock	"Wanted Dead or Alive"	Bon Jovi	Bottom 2
Top 4	Sia	"Elastic Heart"	Sia	Bottom 2
Top 3	Hometown Dedication	"Glory"	Common and John Legend	Safe
Top 3	Scott Borchetta's Choice	"Stay With Me"	Lorraine Ellison	Safe
Top 3	Judges' Choice	"Hello"	Adele	Safe
Top 2	Winner's single	"Battles"	La'Porsha Renae	Runner-up
Top 2	Simon Fuller's Choice	"A House Is Not a Home"	Dionne Warwick	Runner-up
Top 2	Favorite Performance	"Diamonds"	Rihanna	Runner-up
Finale	Finale show	"It Takes Two" (duet with Trent Harmon)	Marvin Gaye and Kim Weston	Runner-up

== Post Idol ==
=== Career beginnings ===
Hours after the end of the American Idol, Renae announced that she had been signed to Big Machine and Motown Records. American Idol mentor and Big Machine Label Group CEO, Scott Borchetta told Billboard the reason for the signing is "Because of the overwhelming fan demand and success of the farewell season of American Idol,." Ethiopia Habtemariam, president of MoTown Records will oversee Renae's album. In a post-Idol interview about her plans Renae indicated she would be leaving Mississippi, and she came under fire when she was asked about the Religious Liberty Accommodations Act, an anti-LGBT law in her home state, "I am one of the people who don't really agree with that lifestyle. I wasn't brought up that way." Renae's single "Battles" debuted at number 22 on the US R&B singles chart with a first week sales total of 7,000.Renae's first live performance post Idol was on Live with Kelly and Michael promoting "Battles" which reached its peak at number 22 on US R&B Digital Charts.

In August 2016, a remix for "Battles" was released, called the Gold Medal Mix. It became the official song for the United States Women's Gymnastic Team for the 2016 Summer Olympics. In November, Renae released the lead single to her upcoming debut album, entitled "Good Woman."

== Career ==
=== 2017: Already All Ready ===
Her debut studio album, Already All Ready was released on March 31, 2017. "Good Woman" is the debut single from the album.

=== 2019–present: The Odessy of Love ===
In 2019, Renae released a single, "Solo", which failed to chart or garner any media attention, prompting her to go on an extended hiatus. After a hacker briefly took over her Twitter, she changed her social media handles to "ASEEternal", and returned with a new stage name, "A.S.E." In May 2020, she revealed plans to self-publish a seven-volume memoir series titled "Battles", the first book Meet Me on the Battlefield was published in June 2020. In May 2022, she released a four-part album series: The Odessy [sic] of Love, independently through Man of Yah productions, with an accompanying music video for the lead single, "Black Swan" on YouTube. The albums failed to gain any respectable media attention or appear on any chart. The albums were then suddenly removed from streaming platforms for unknown reasons.

== Discography ==
=== Studio albums ===
Title	Album details	Peak chart positions		
Title	Album details	US	US Heat	R&B
Already All Ready	Released: March 31, 2017; Label: Motown, Big Machine, 19; Format: CD, Digital download	113	1	15
The Odessy of Love, #I: Battle Bayou	Released: May 22, 2022; Label: Man of Yah Productions; Format: Streaming	—	—	—
The Odessy of Love, #II: Dead Read Sea	Released: May 22, 2022; Label: Man of Yah Productions; Format: Streaming	—	—	—
The Odessy of Love, #III: Covenant Cove	Released: May 22, 2022; Label: Man of Yah Productions; Format: Streaming	—	—	—
The Odessy of Love, #IV: Sea's Spring	Released: May 22, 2022; Label: Man of Yah Productions; Format: Streaming	—	—	—

=== Singles ===
List of singles, with selected chart positions and certifications
Title	Year	Peak chart positions			Album
Title	Year	US R&B Digital	US Adult R&B	US R&B/Hip Hop	Album
"Battles"	2016	22	—	—	Non-album single
"Battles (Gold Medal Mix)"	2016	—	—	—	Non-album single
"Good Woman"	2016	—	5	35	Already All Ready
"Already All Ready"	2017	—	—	—	Already All Ready
"What's Love Got to Do with It?"	2018	—	—	—	Non-album single
"Solo"	2019	—	—	—	Non-album single
"My Empty"	2022	—	—	—	Non-album single
"Fallen"	2022	—	—	—	Non-album single
"Black Swan"	2022	—	—	—	The Odessy of Love, #I: Battle Bayou
