= List of American Idol finalists =

American Idol is an American talent reality television series which first aired in 2002. As of May 2026, there have been 24 seasons: the first 15 aired on FOX, while the next 9 were broadcast on ABC and Hulu/Disney+. Each season, the final round of competition features ten to fourteen singers. There have been 289 contestants who were finalists.

The show's age requirements have varied from year-to-year. Of the finalists, 87 of them were under the age of 20, including five winners and seven runners-up. First season-winner Kelly Clarkson holds the record for the highest-selling album sales worldwide, with more than 25 million copies, while fourth season-winner Carrie Underwood has the record for the highest-selling album sales in the United States, with more than 13 million copies sold.

As of 2025, seven finalists have died: Michael Johns (d. 2014), Rickey Smith (d. 2016), Leah LaBelle (d. 2018), Nikki McKibbin (d. 2020), Willie Spence (d. 2022), C. J. Harris (d. 2023), and Mandisa (d. 2024). In addition, two semifinalists have also died: seventh season's Joanne Borgella (d. 2014) and third season's Marque Lynche (d. 2015, brother of Michael Lynche).

Table key
†	Indicates an alumnus who is now deceased

== Contestants ==
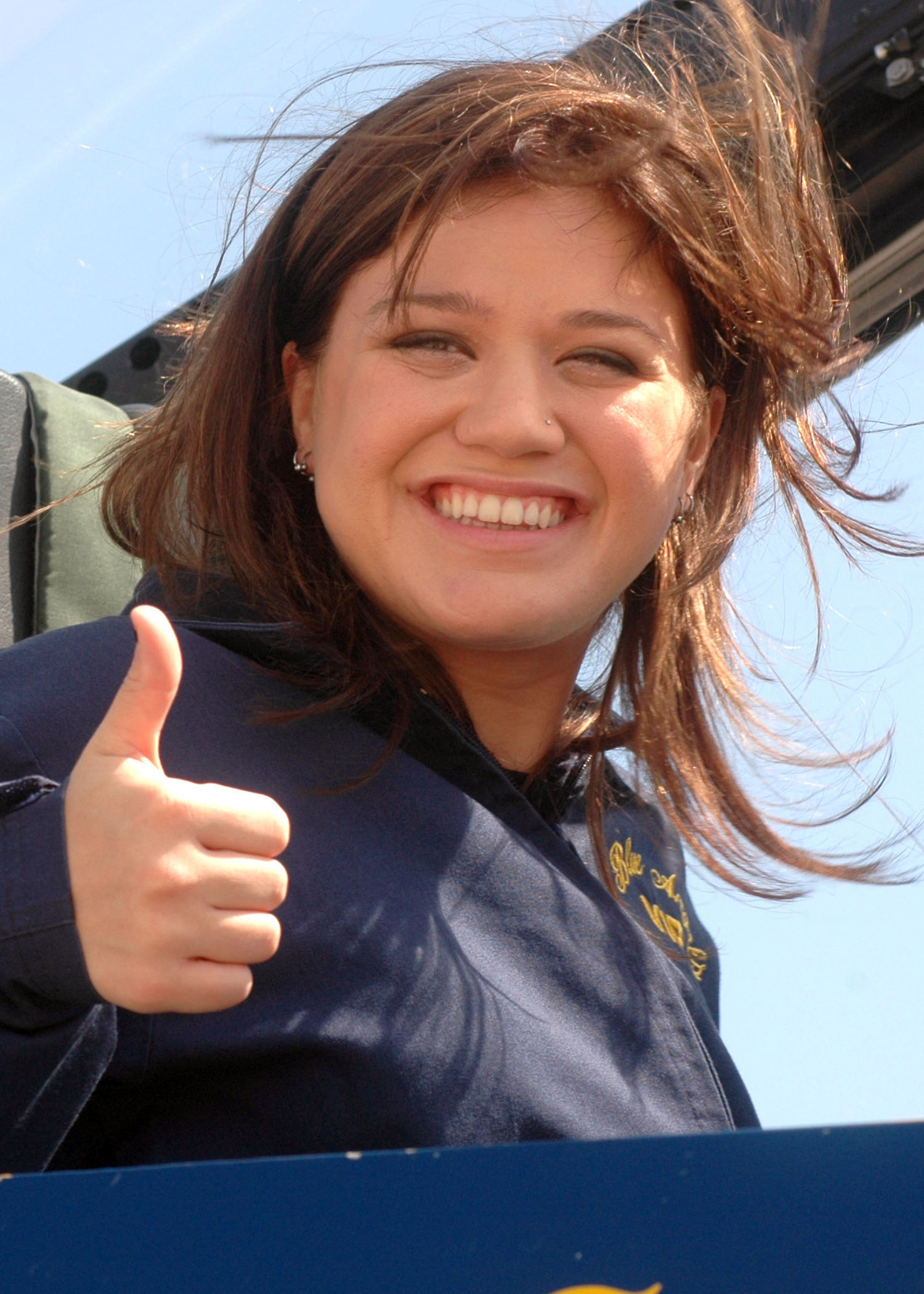
Kelly Clarkson, first season winner

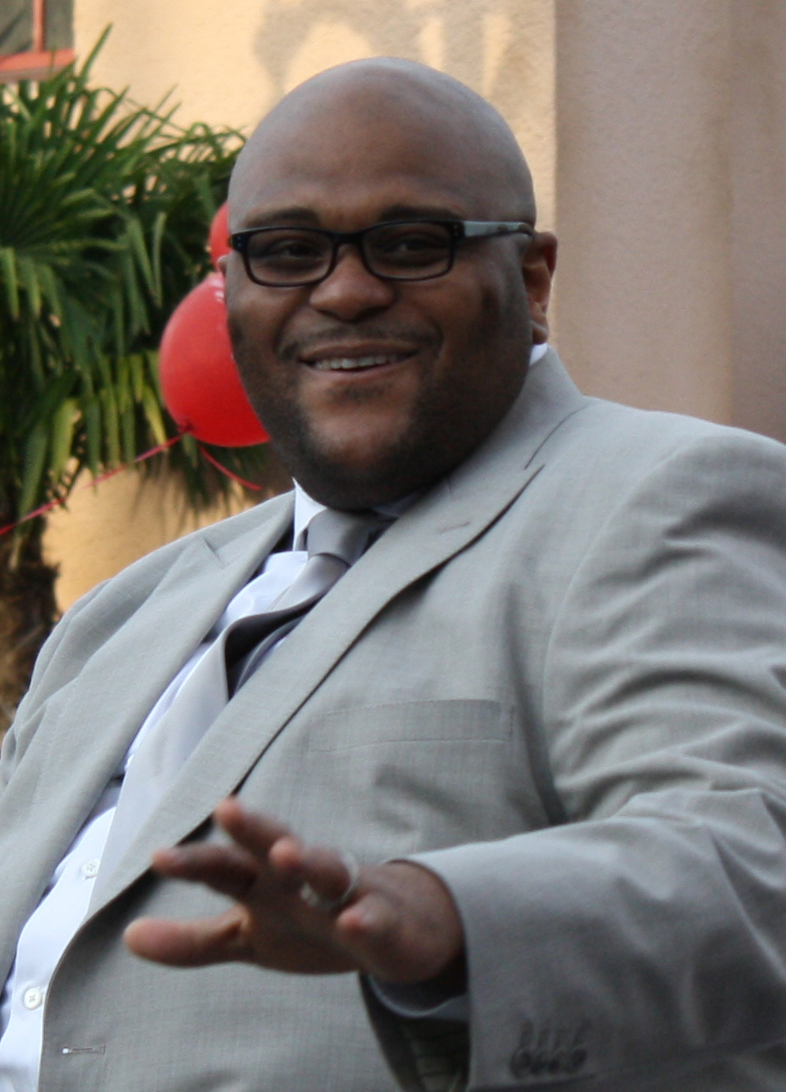
Ruben Studdard, second season winner

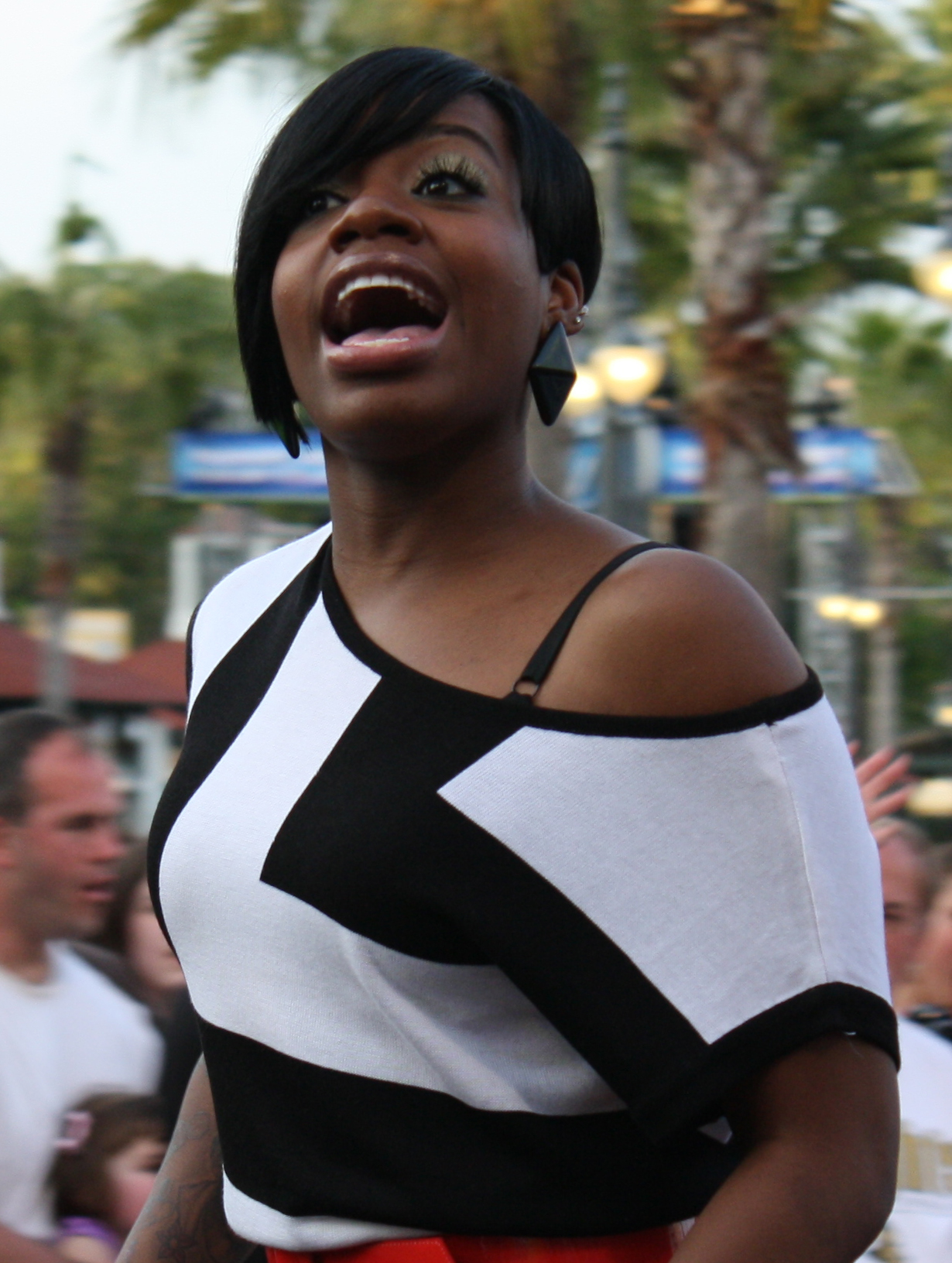
Fantasia Barrino, third season winner

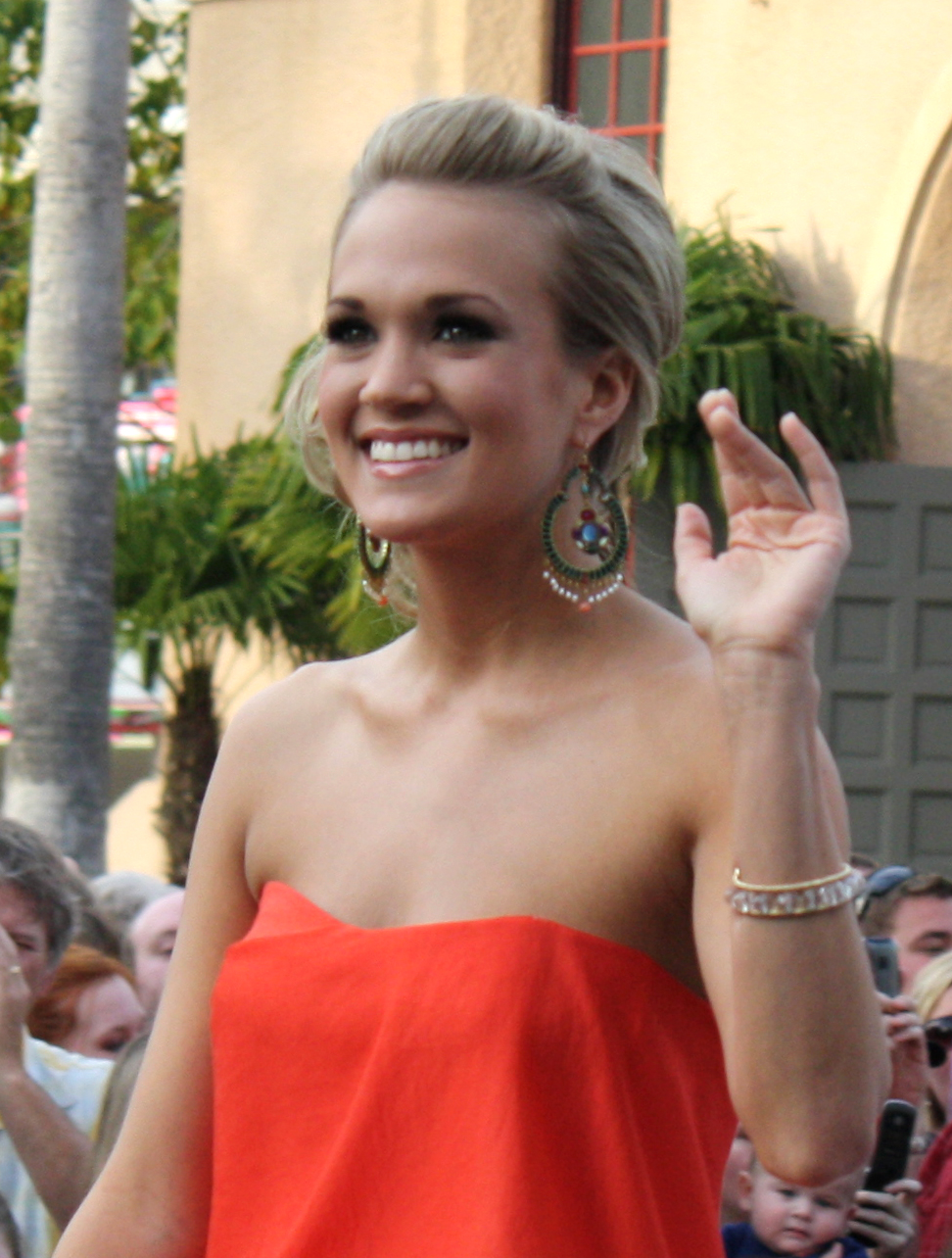
Carrie Underwood, fourth season winner

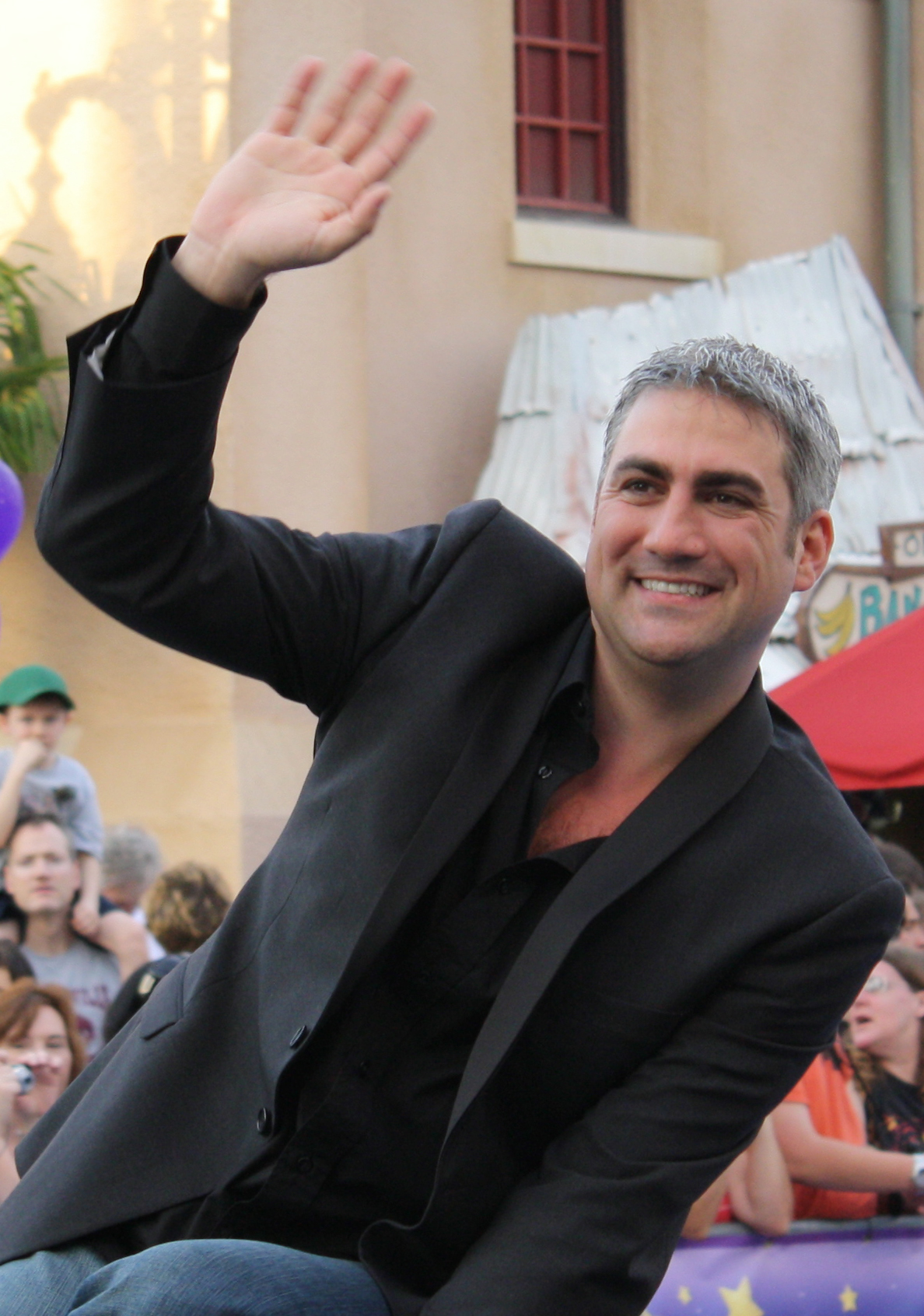
Taylor Hicks, fifth season winner

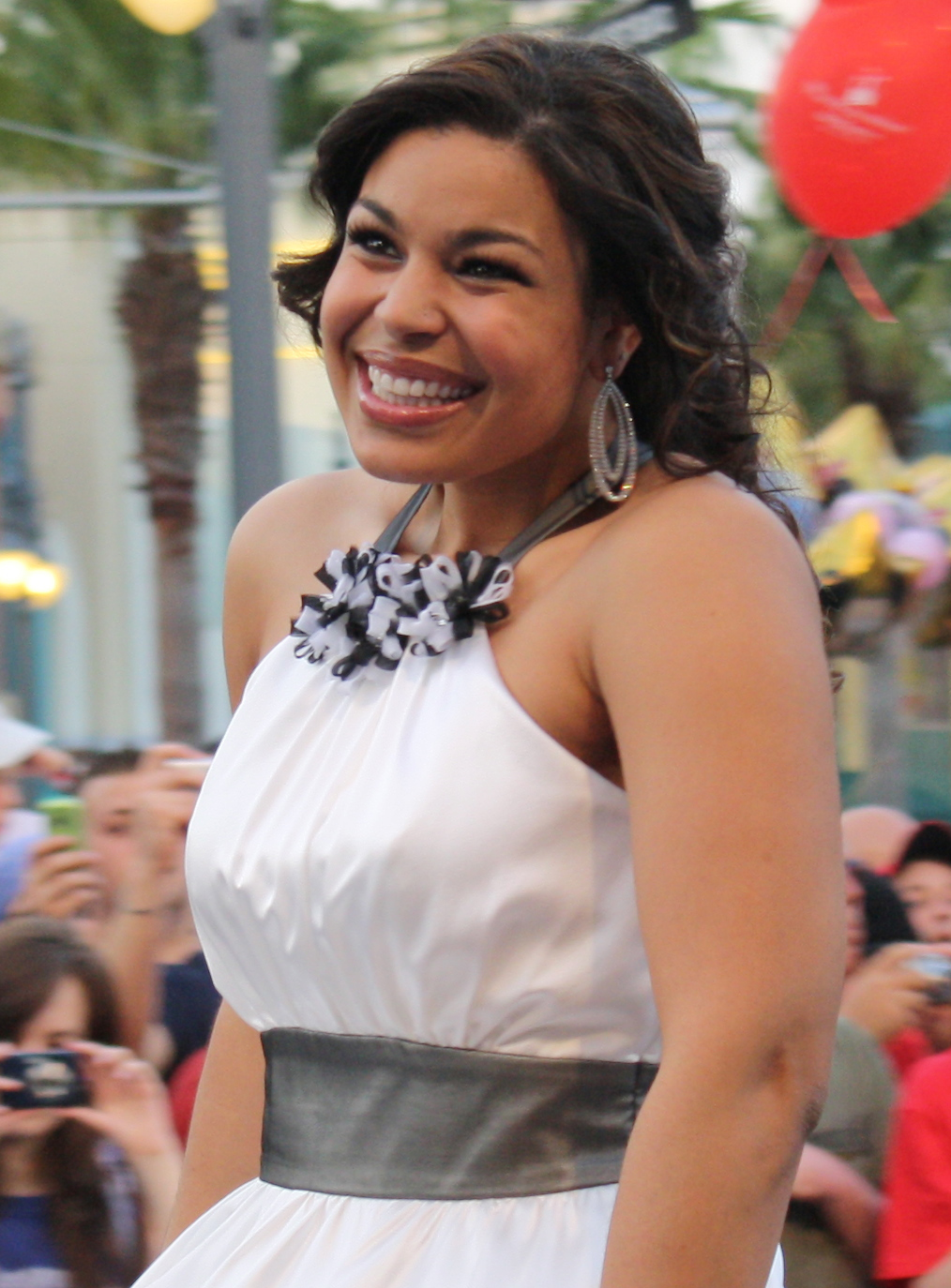
Jordin Sparks, sixth season winner

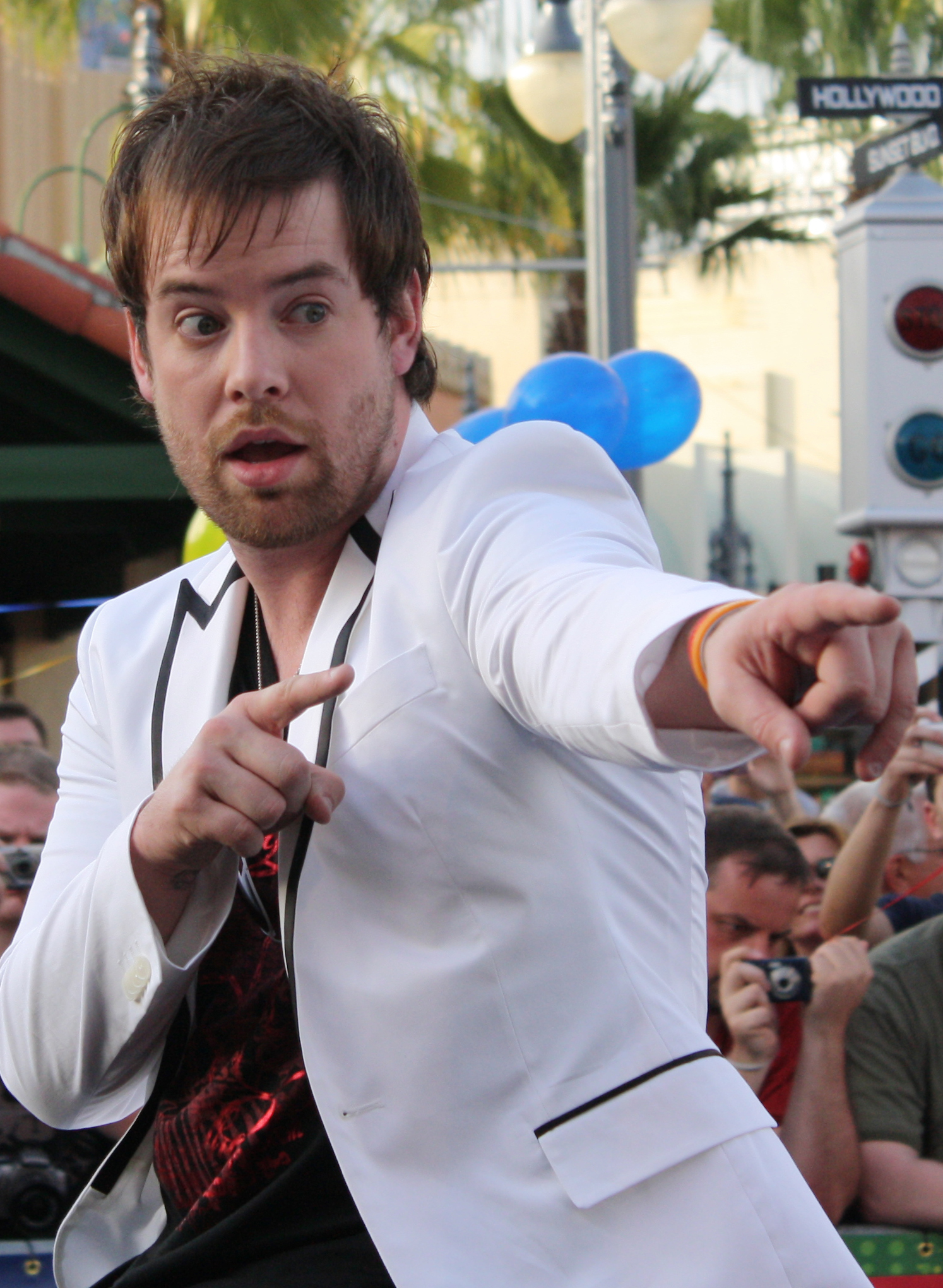
David Cook, seventh season winner

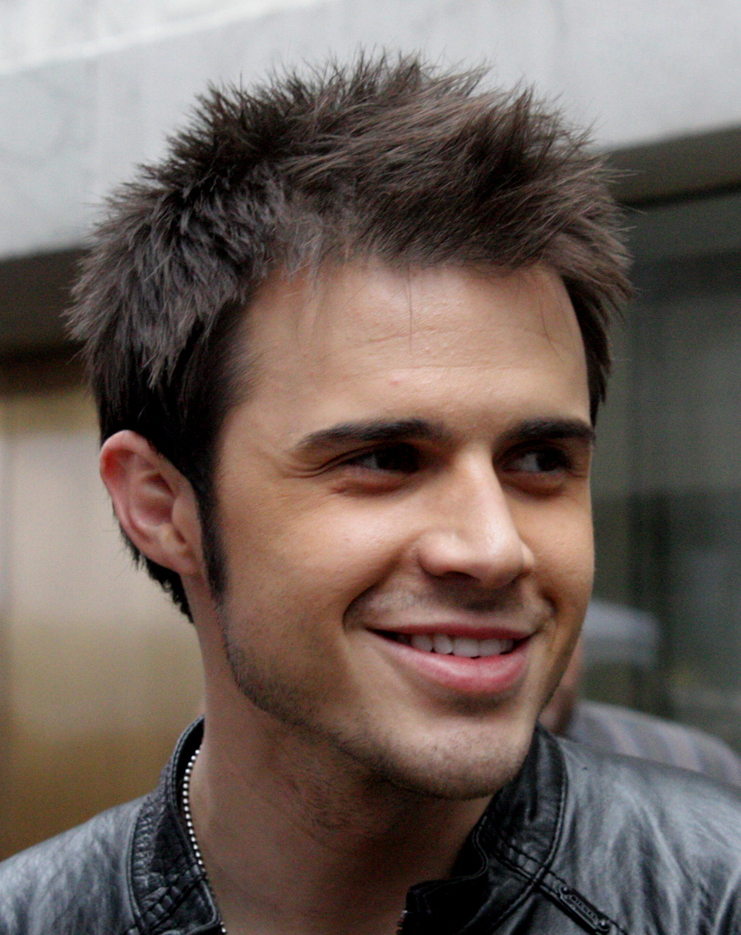
Kris Allen, eighth season winner

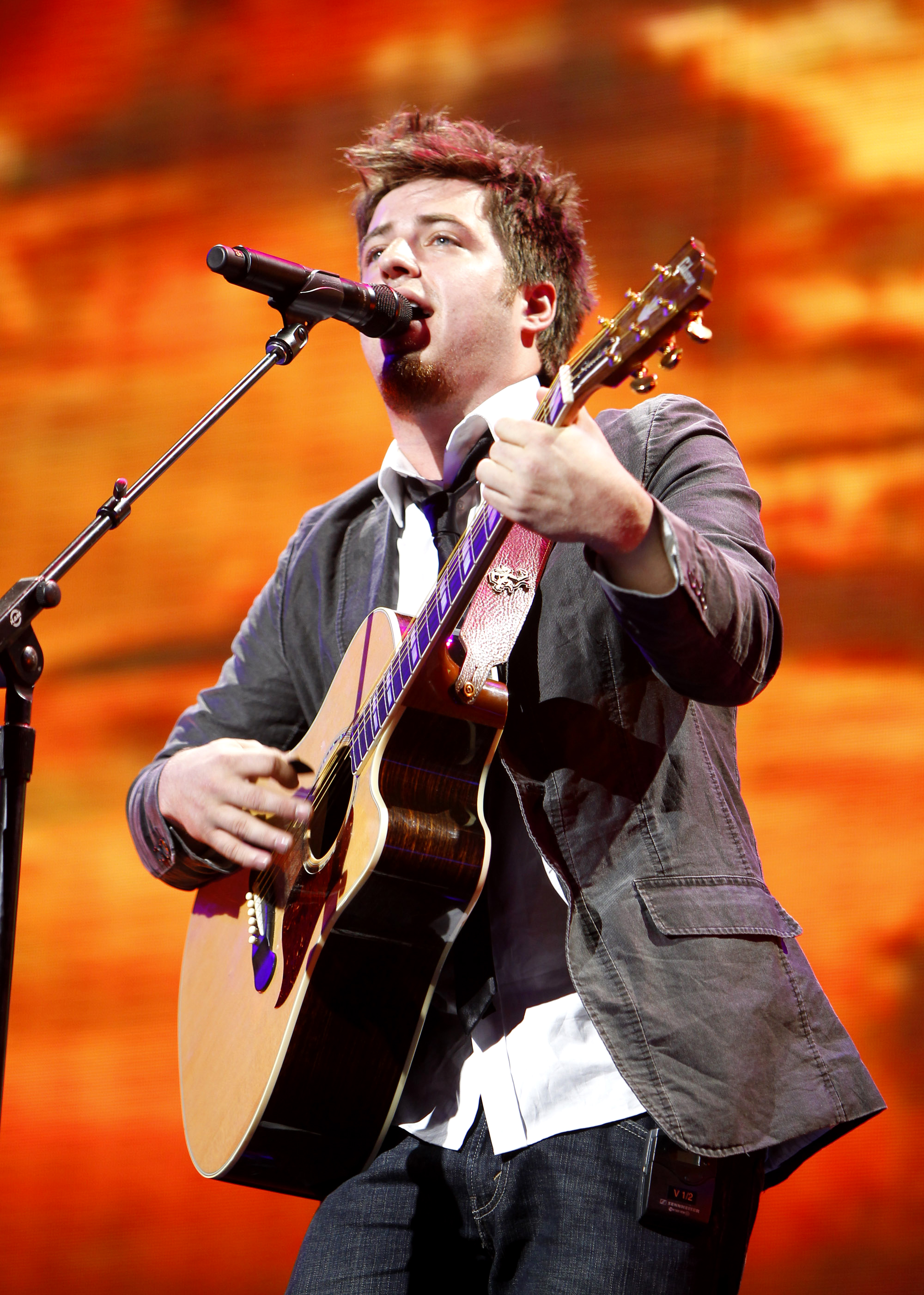
Lee DeWyze, ninth season winner

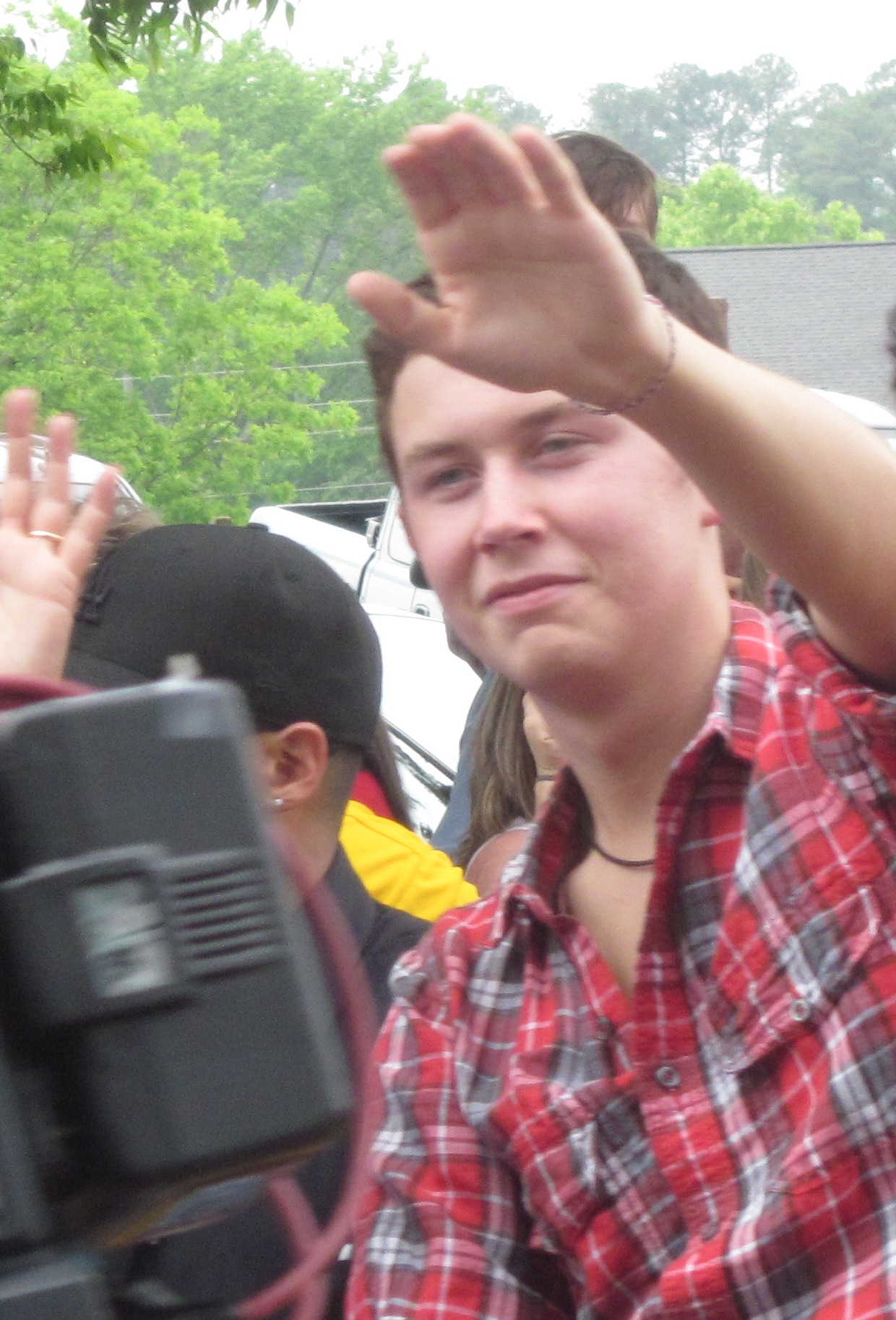
Scotty McCreery, tenth season winner

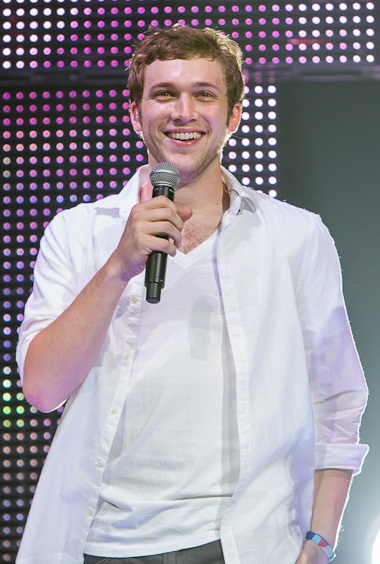
Phillip Phillips, eleventh season winner

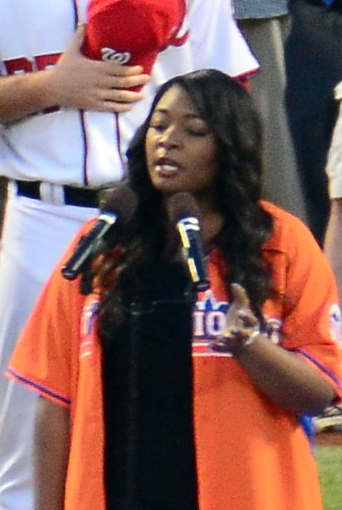
Candice Glover, twelfth season winner

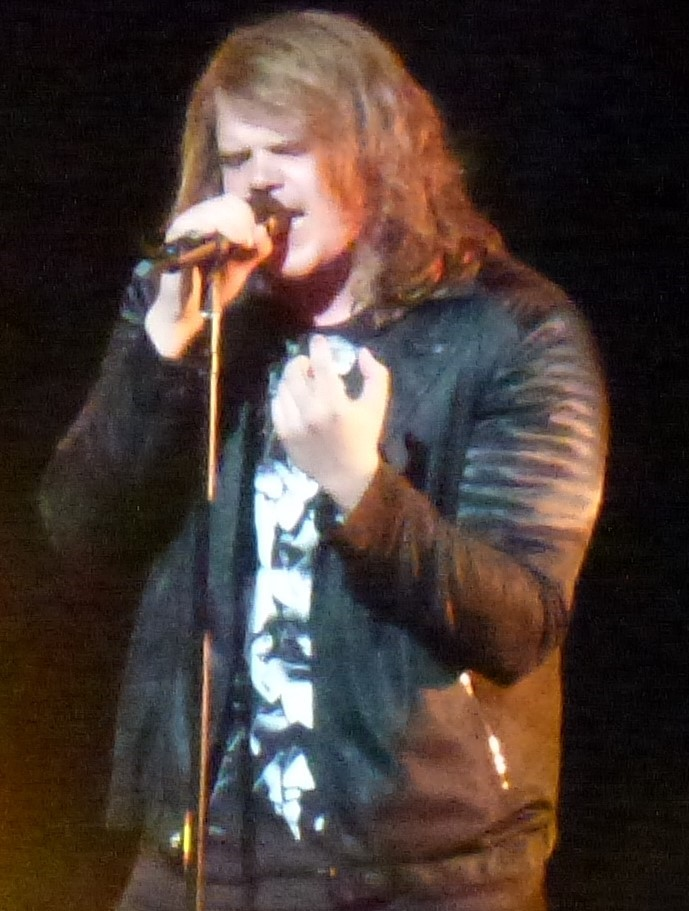
Caleb Johnson, thirteenth season winner

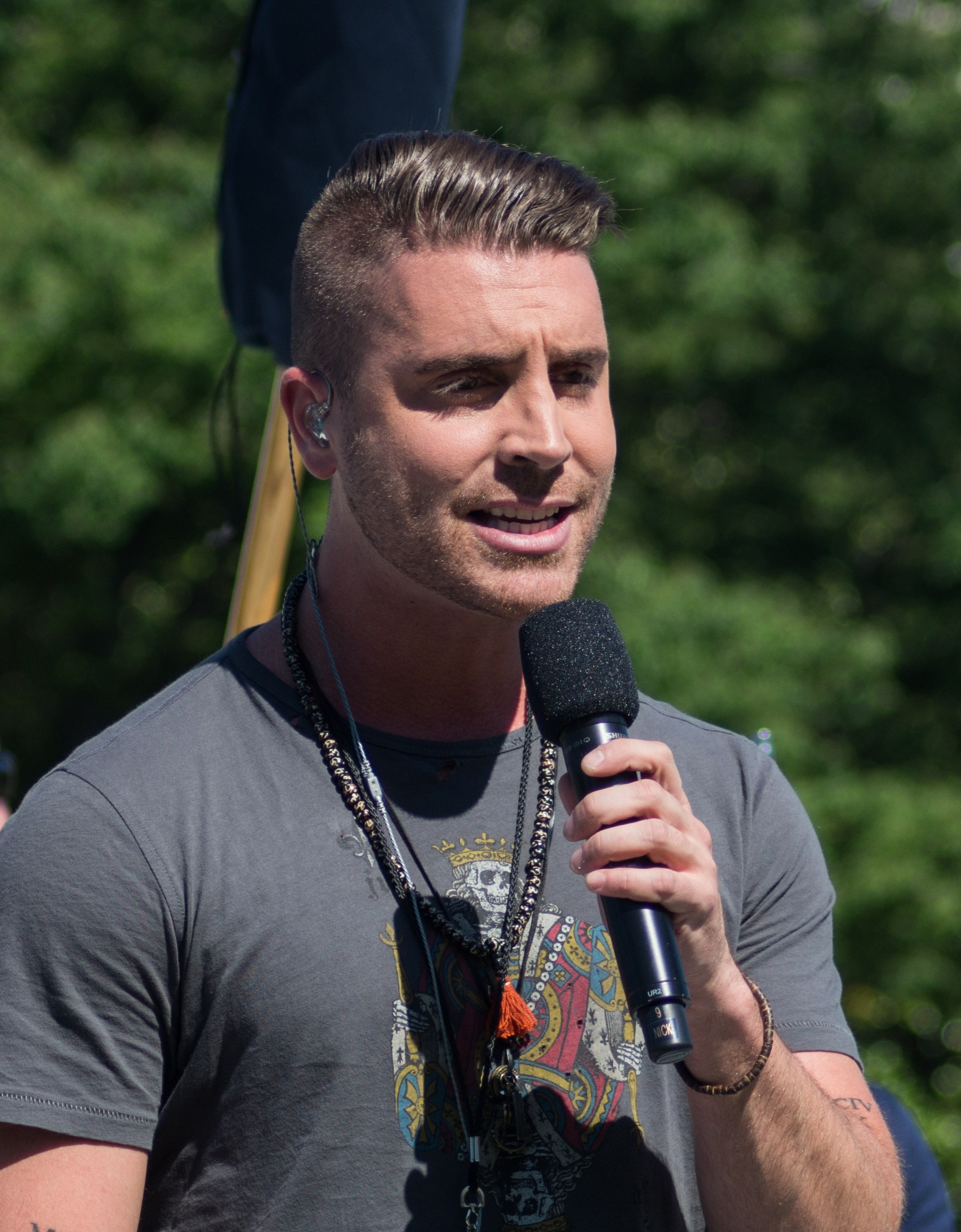
Nick Fradiani, fourteenth season winner

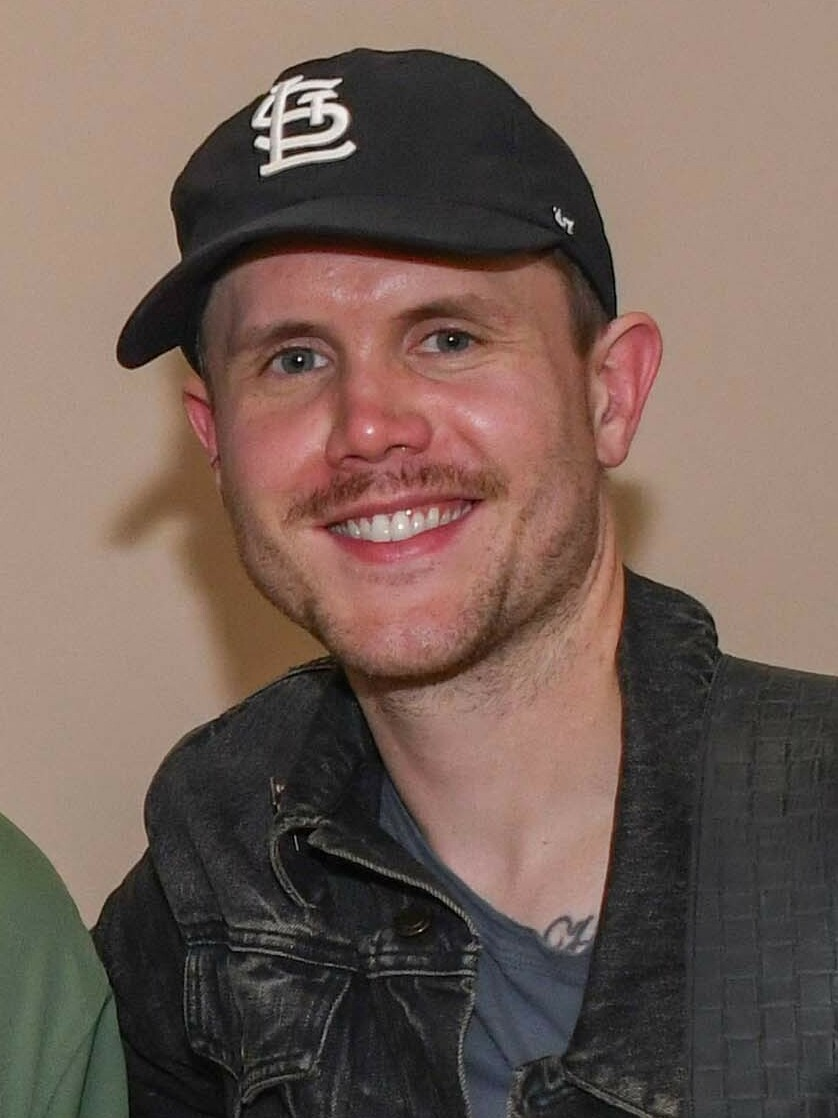
Trent Harmon, fifteenth season winner

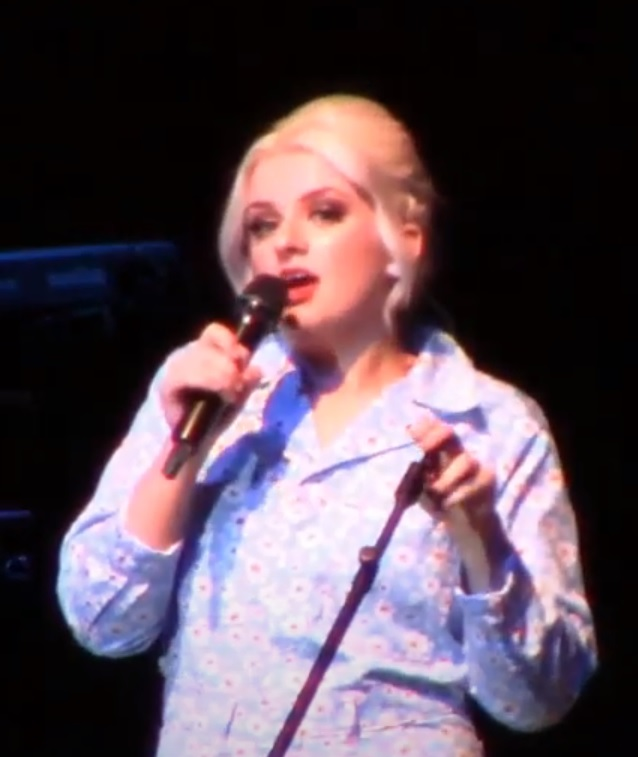
Maddie Poppe, sixteenth season winner

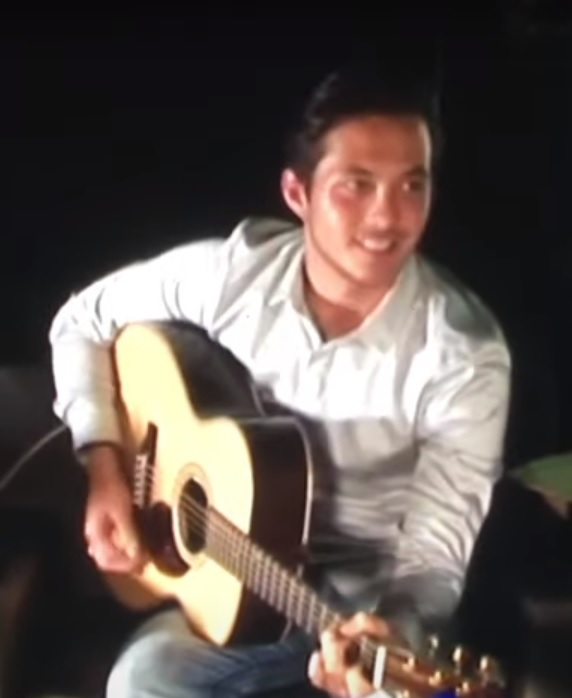
Laine Hardy, seventeenth season winner

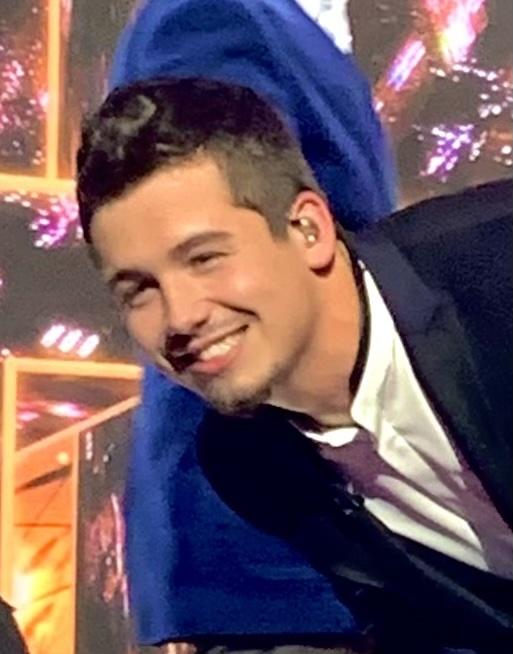
Noah Thompson, twentieth season winner

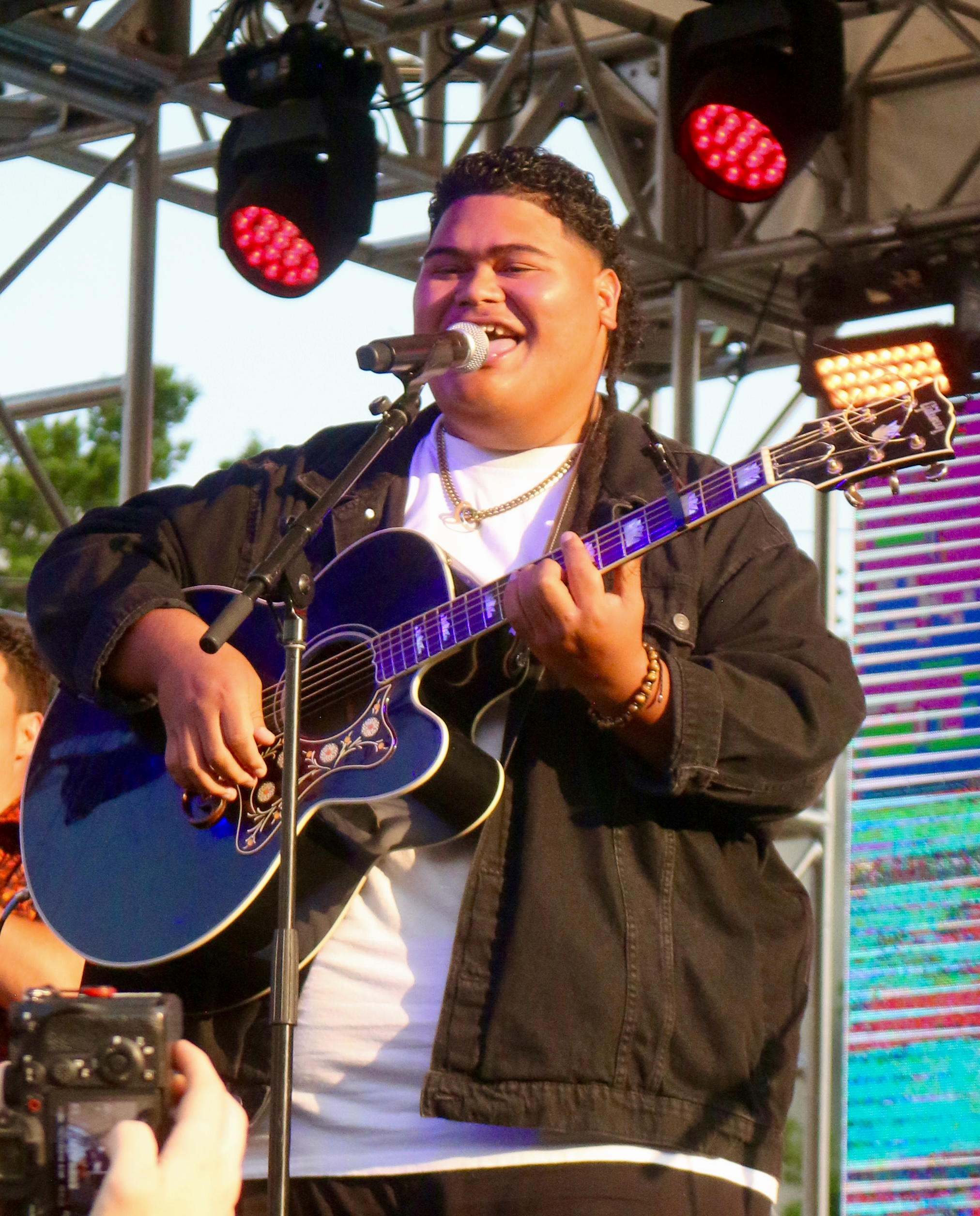
Iam Tongi, twenty-first season winner

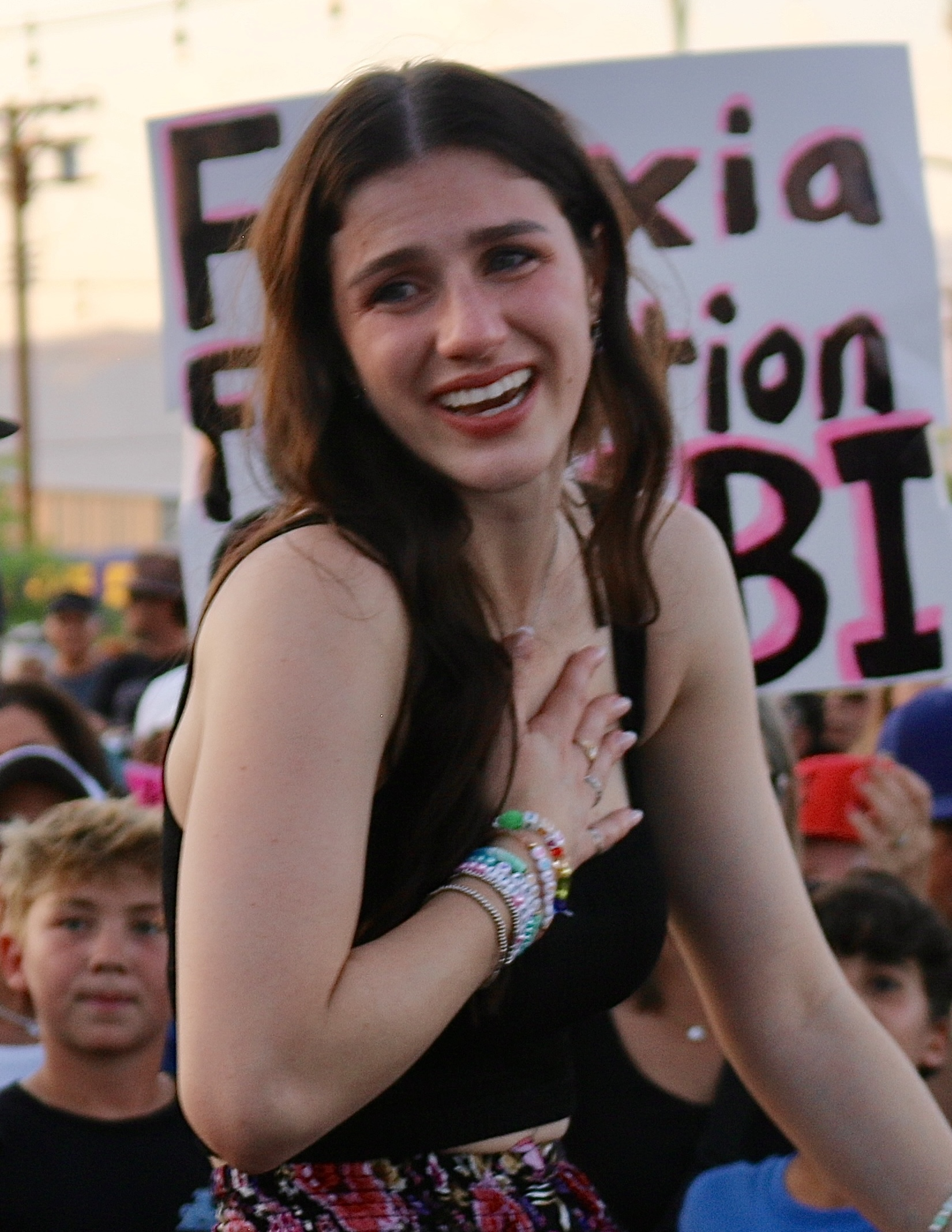
Abi Carter, twenty-second season winner

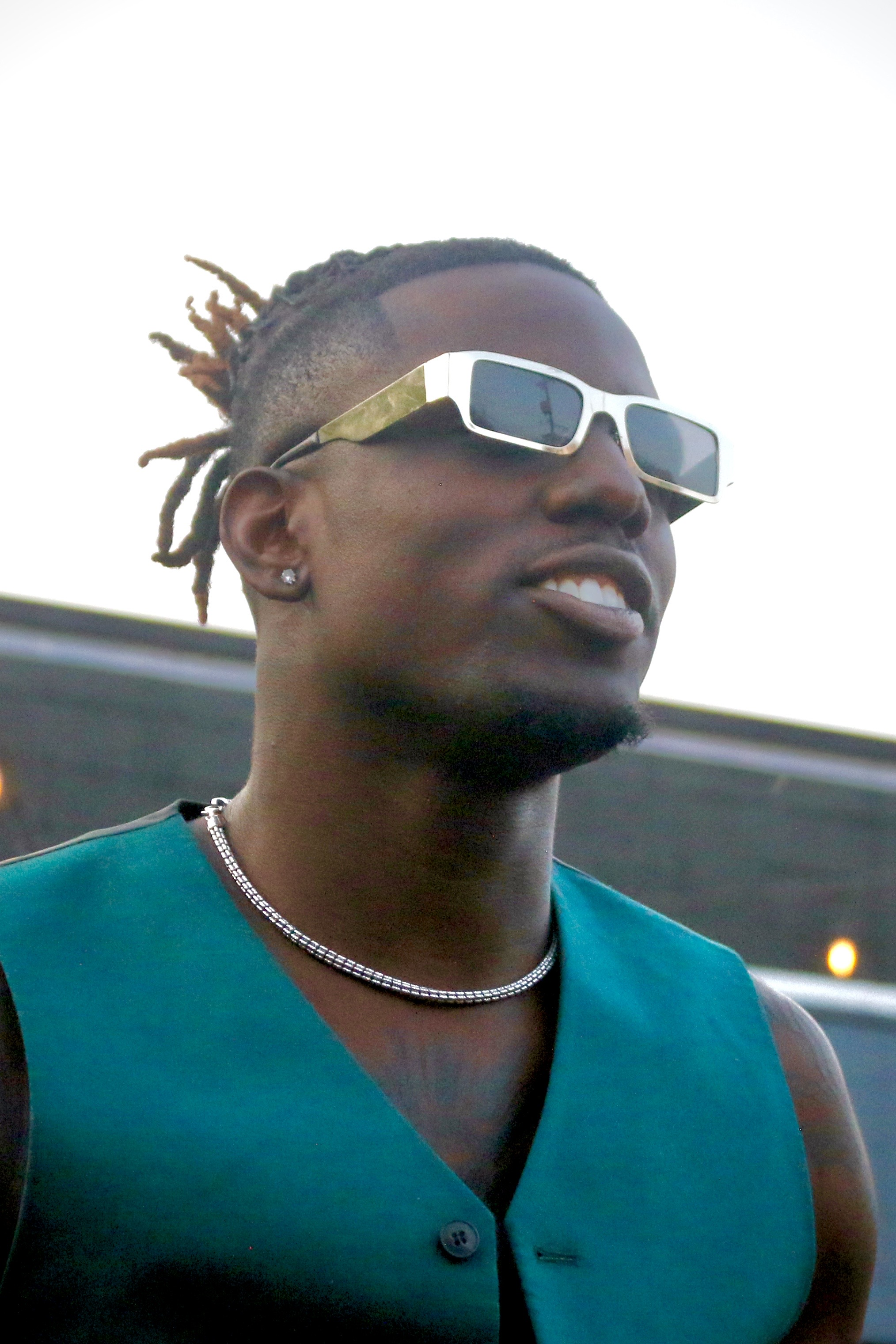
Jamal Roberts, twenty-third season winner

Name	Age	Hometown	Season	Place finish
EJay Day	20	Lawrenceville, Georgia	1	9th–10th
Jim Verraros	19	Chicago, Illinois	1	9th–10th
AJ Gil	17	San Diego, California	1	8th
Ryan Starr	19	Los Angeles, California	1	7th
Christina Christian	21	New York City, New York	1	6th
R. J. Helton	21	Cumming, Georgia	1	5th
Tamyra Gray	23	Takoma Park, Maryland	1	4th
Nikki McKibbin †	23	Grand Prairie, Texas	1	3rd
Justin Guarini	23	Doylestown, Pennsylvania	1	Runner-up
Kelly Clarkson	20	Burleson, Texas	1	Winner
Vanessa Olivarez	22	Atlanta, Georgia	2	12th
Charles Grigsby	24	Oberlin, Ohio	2	11th
Julia DeMato	24	Brookfield, Connecticut	2	10th
Corey Clark	22	Nashville, Tennessee	2	9th
Rickey Smith †	23	Keene, Texas	2	8th
Kimberly Caldwell	21	Katy, Texas	2	7th
Carmen Rasmusen	18	Bountiful, Utah	2	6th
Trenyce	23	Memphis, Tennessee	2	5th
Josh Gracin	22	Oceanside, California	2	4th
Kimberley Locke	25	Nashville, Tennessee	2	3rd
Clay Aiken	24	Raleigh, North Carolina	2	Runner-up
Ruben Studdard	24	Birmingham, Alabama	2	Winner
Leah LaBelle †	17	Seattle, Washington	3	12th
Matthew Rogers	25	Rancho Cucamonga, California	3	11th
Amy Adams	24	Bakersfield, California	3	10th
Camile Velasco	18	Haiku, Hawaii	3	9th
Jon Peter Lewis	24	Rexburg, Idaho	3	8th
Jennifer Hudson	22	Chicago, Illinois	3	7th
John Stevens	16	East Amherst, New York	3	6th
George Huff	22	New Orleans, Louisiana	3	5th
LaToya London	25	Oakland, California	3	4th
Jasmine Trias	17	Mililani, Hawaii	3	3rd
Diana DeGarmo	16	Snellville, Georgia	3	Runner-up
Fantasia Barrino	19	High Point, North Carolina	3	Winner
Lindsey Cardinale	20	Ponchatoula, Louisiana	4	12th
Mikalah Gordon	17	Las Vegas, Nevada	4	11th
Jessica Sierra	19	Tampa, Florida	4	10th
Nikko Smith (Note: Mario Vazquez initially made the Top 12 by votes, while Nikko Smith was eliminated in the semifinals. However, Vazquez withdrew from the competition, citing it was allegedly due to "personal, artistic reasons". Smith was reinstated in his place as a finalist, as having the next most votes from the Top 8 Boys (thereby inferring Travis Tucker had the least).)	22	Town and Country, Missouri	4	9th
Nadia Turner	28	Miami, Florida	4	8th
Anwar Robinson	25	East Orange, New Jersey	4	7th
Constantine Maroulis	29	New York City, New York	4	6th
Scott Savol	28	Shaker Heights, Ohio	4	5th
Anthony Fedorov	19	Trevose, Pennsylvania	4	4th
Vonzell Solomon	21	Fort Myers, Florida	4	3rd
Bo Bice	29	Helena, Alabama	4	Runner-up
Carrie Underwood	21	Checotah, Oklahoma	4	Winner
Melissa McGhee	21	Tampa, Florida	5	12th
Kevin Covais	16	Levittown, New York	5	11th
Lisa Tucker	16	Anaheim, California	5	10th
Mandisa †	29	Antioch, Tennessee	5	9th
Bucky Covington	28	Rockingham, North Carolina	5	8th
Ace Young	25	Denver, Colorado	5	7th
Kellie Pickler	19	Albemarle, North Carolina	5	6th
Paris Bennett	17	Fayetteville, Georgia	5	5th
Chris Daughtry	26	McLeansville, North Carolina	5	4th
Elliott Yamin	27	Richmond, Virginia	5	3rd
Katharine McPhee	21	Los Angeles, California	5	Runner-up
Taylor Hicks	29	Birmingham, Alabama	5	Winner
Brandon Rogers	28	Los Angeles, California	6	12th
Stephanie Edwards	19	Savannah, Georgia	6	11th
Chris Sligh	28	Greenville, South Carolina	6	10th
Gina Glocksen	22	Naperville, Illinois	6	9th
Haley Scarnato	24	San Antonio, Texas	6	8th
Sanjaya Malakar	17	Federal Way, Washington	6	7th
Chris Richardson	22	Chesapeake, Virginia	6	5th–6th
Phil Stacey	29	Jacksonville, Florida	6	5th–6th
LaKisha Jones	27	Fort Meade, Maryland	6	4th
Melinda Doolittle	29	Brentwood, Tennessee	6	3rd
Blake Lewis	25	Bothell, Washington	6	Runner-up
Jordin Sparks	17	Glendale, Arizona	6	Winner
David Hernandez	24	Glendale, Arizona	7	12th
Amanda Overmyer	23	Mulberry, Indiana	7	11th
Chikezie	22	Inglewood, California	7	10th
Ramiele Malubay	20	Miramar, Florida	7	9th
Michael Johns †	29	Buckhead, Georgia	7	8th
Kristy Lee Cook	24	Selma, Oregon	7	7th
Carly Smithson	24	San Diego, California	7	6th
Brooke White	24	Mesa, Arizona	7	5th
Jason Castro	20	Rockwall, Texas	7	4th
Syesha Mercado	21	Sarasota, Florida	7	3rd
David Archuleta	17	Murray, Utah	7	Runner-up
David Cook	25	Blue Springs, Missouri	7	Winner
Jasmine Murray	16	Starkville, Mississippi	8	12th–13th
Jorge Núñez	21	Carolina, Puerto Rico	8	12th–13th
Alexis Grace	21	Memphis, Tennessee	8	11th
Michael Sarver	27	Jasper, Texas	8	10th
Megan Joy	23	Sandy, Utah	8	9th
Scott MacIntyre	23	Scottsdale, Arizona	8	8th
Anoop Desai	21	Chapel Hill, North Carolina	8	6th–7th
Lil Rounds	23	Memphis, Tennessee	8	6th–7th
Matt Giraud	23	Kalamazoo, Michigan	8	5th
Allison Iraheta	16	Los Angeles, California	8	4th
Danny Gokey	28	Milwaukee, Wisconsin	8	3rd
Adam Lambert	27	San Diego, California	8	Runner-up
Kris Allen	23	Conway, Arkansas	8	Winner
Lacey Brown	24	Amarillo, Texas	9	12th
Paige Miles	24	Naples, Florida	9	11th
Didi Benami	23	Los Angeles, California	9	10th
Andrew Garcia	24	Moreno Valley, California	9	8th–9th
Katie Stevens	17	Middlebury, Connecticut	9	8th–9th
Tim Urban	20	Duncanville, Texas	9	7th
Siobhan Magnus	19	Barnstable, Massachusetts	9	6th
Aaron Kelly	16	Sonestown, Pennsylvania	9	5th
Michael Lynche	26	St. Petersburg, Florida	9	4th
Casey James	27	Fort Worth, Texas	9	3rd
Crystal Bowersox	23	Elliston, Ohio	9	Runner-up
Lee DeWyze	23	Mount Prospect, Illinois	9	Winner
Ashthon Jones	24	Goodlettsville, Tennessee	10	13th
Karen Rodriguez	21	New York City, New York	10	12th
Naima Adedapo	26	Milwaukee, Wisconsin	10	10th–11th
Thia Megia	16	Mountain House, Alameda County, California	10	10th–11th
Pia Toscano	22	New York City, New York	10	9th
Paul McDonald	26	Nashville, Tennessee	10	8th
Stefano Langone	21	Kent, Washington	10	7th
Casey Abrams	20	Idyllwild–Pine Cove, California	10	6th
Jacob Lusk	23	Compton, California	10	5th
James Durbin	22	Santa Cruz, California	10	4th
Haley Reinhart	20	Wheeling, Illinois	10	3rd
Lauren Alaina	16	Rossville, Georgia	10	Runner-up
Scotty McCreery	17	Garner, North Carolina	10	Winner
Jeremy Rosado	19	Valrico, Florida	11	13th
Jermaine Jones	25	Pine Hill, New Jersey	11	12th
Shannon Magrane	16	Tampa, Florida	11	11th
Erika Van Pelt	26	South Kingstown, Rhode Island	11	10th
Heejun Han	22	New York City, New York	11	9th
DeAndre Brackensick	17	San Jose, California	11	8th
Colton Dixon	20	Murfreesboro, Tennessee	11	7th
Elise Testone	28	Mount Pleasant, South Carolina	11	6th
Skylar Laine	18	Brandon, Mississippi	11	5th
Hollie Cavanagh	18	McKinney, Texas	11	4th
Joshua Ledet	19	Westlake, Louisiana	11	3rd
Jessica Sanchez	16	San Diego, California	11	Runner-up
Phillip Phillips	21	Leesburg, Georgia	11	Winner
Curtis Finch, Jr.	24	St. Louis, Missouri	12	10th
Paul Jolley	23	Palmersville, Tennessee	12	9th
Devin Velez	18	Chicago, Illinois	12	8th
Burnell Taylor	19	New Orleans, Louisiana	12	7th
Lazaro Arbos	22	Naples, Florida	12	6th
Janelle Arthur	23	Oliver Springs, Tennessee	12	5th
Amber Holcomb	19	Houston, Texas	12	4th
Angie Miller	19	Beverly, Massachusetts	12	3rd
Kree Harrison	22	Woodville, Texas	12	Runner-up
Candice Glover	23	St. Helena Island, South Carolina	12	Winner
Kristen O'Connor	24	Sebastian, Florida	13	13th
Emily Piriz	18	Orlando, Florida	13	12th
Ben Briley	24	Gallatin, Tennessee	13	11th
MK Nobilette	20	San Francisco, California	13	10th
Majesty Rose	21	Goldsboro, North Carolina	13	9th
Malaya Watson	16	Southfield, Michigan	13	8th
Dexter Roberts	22	Fayette, Alabama	13	7th
C.J. Harris †	23	Jasper, Alabama	13	6th
Sam Woolf	17	Bradenton, Florida	13	5th
Jess Meuse	23	Slapout, Alabama	13	4th
Alex Preston	20	Mont Vernon, New Hampshire	13	3rd
Jena Irene	17	Farmington Hills, Michigan	13	Runner-up
Caleb Johnson	23	Asheville, North Carolina	13	Winner
Sarina-Joi Crowe	19	Columbia, Tennessee	14	12th
Adanna Duru	18	Diamond Bar, California	14	10th–11th
Maddie Walker	17	Ankeny, Iowa	14	10th–11th
Daniel Seavey	15	Portland, Oregon	14	9th
Qaasim Middleton	19	New York City, New York	14	8th
Joey Cook	23	Woodbridge, Virginia	14	7th
Quentin Alexander	20	New Orleans, Louisiana	14	6th
Tyanna Jones	16	Jacksonville, Florida	14	5th
Rayvon Owen	23	Richmond, Virginia	14	4th
JAX	19	East Brunswick, New Jersey	14	3rd
Clark Beckham	22	White House, Tennessee	14	Runner-up
Nick Fradiani	29	Guilford, Connecticut	14	Winner
Gianna Isabella	15	Jackson Township, New Jersey	15	9th–10th
Olivia Rox	17	Agoura Hills, California	15	9th–10th
Avalon Young	21	San Diego, California	15	7th–8th
Lee Jean	16	Bluffton, South Carolina	15	7th–8th
Tristan McIntosh	15	Nashville, Tennessee	15	6th
Sonika Vaid	20	Weston, Massachusetts	15	5th
MacKenzie Bourg	23	Lafayette, Louisiana	15	4th
Dalton Rapattoni	20	Dallas, Texas	15	3rd
La'Porsha Renae	22	McComb, Mississippi	15	Runner-up
Trent Harmon	25	Amory, Mississippi	15	Winner
Ada Vox	24	San Antonio, Texas	16	8th-10th
Dennis Lorenzo	26	Philadelphia, Pennsylvania	16	8th-10th
Michelle Sussett	22	Miami, Florida	16	8th-10th
Catie Turner	17	Langhorne Borough, Pennsylvania	16	6th-7th
Jurnee	18	Denver, Colorado	16	6th-7th
Cade Foehner	21	Shelbyville, Texas	16	4th-5th
Michael J. Woodard	20	Philadelphia, Pennsylvania	16	4th-5th
Gabby Barrett	17	Pittsburgh, Pennsylvania	16	3rd
Caleb Lee Hutchinson	19	Dallas, Georgia	16	Runner-Up
Maddie Poppe	20	Clarksville, Iowa	16	Winner
Dimitrius Graham	27	Baltimore, Maryland	17	9th-10th
Uché	24	Sugar Land, Texas	17	9th-10th
Alyssa Raghu	17	Orlando, Florida	17	7th-8th
Walker Burroughs	20	Birmingham, Alabama	17	7th-8th
Jeremiah Lloyd Harmon	26	Catonsville, Maryland	17	6th
Laci Kaye Booth	23	Livingston, Texas	17	4th-5th
Wade Cota	27	Phoenix, Arizona	17	4th-5th
Madison VanDenburg	17	Cohoes, New York	17	3rd
Alejandro Aranda	24	Pomona, California	17	Runner-Up
Laine Hardy	18	Livingston, Louisiana	17	Winner
Grace Leer	28	Danville, California	18	8th-11th
Jovin Webb	29	Gonzales, Louisiana	18	8th-11th
Makayla Phillips	17	Temecula, California	18	8th-11th
Sophia James	20	Long Beach, California	18	8th-11th
Julia Gargano	22	New York City, New York	18	6th-7th
Louis Knight	19	Philadelphia, Pennsylvania	18	6th-7th
Dillon James	27	Bakersfield, California	18	3rd-5th
Francisco Martin	19	San Francisco, California	18	3rd-5th
Jonny West	23	Murrieta, California	18	3rd-5th
Arthur Gunn	22	Wichita, Kansas	18	Runner-up
Just Sam	21	New York City, New York	18	Winner
Ava August	15	Laguna Niguel, California	19	11th-13th
Beane	23	Brighton, Massachusetts	19	11th-13th
Madison Watkins	25	Fayetteville, Arkansas	19	11th-13th
Alyssa Wray	19	Perryville, Kentucky	19	8th-10th
Cassandra Coleman	24	Columbia, Tennessee	19	8th-10th
DeShawn Goncalves	20	Cleveland, Ohio	19	8th-10th
Arthur Gunn (Note: In a surprise twist introduced specifically during this season, ten assorted contestants from the previous season were invited back to compete for a chance to re-enter the competition. (Due to the fact that those twenty contestants, as a result of the COVID-19 pandemic, had to broadcast from home, none of them ever sang on the Idol stage.) Season 18's runner-up Arthur Gunn won the public vote and re-entered at the Top 10, lasting two weeks.)	23	Wichita, Kansas	19	6th-7th
Hunter Metts	22	Franklin, Tennessee	19	6th-7th
Caleb Kennedy	16	Roebuck, South Carolina	19	5th
Casey Bishop	16	Estero, Florida	19	4th
Grace Kinstler	20	Lakewood, Illinois	19	3rd
Willie Spence †	21	Douglas, Georgia	19	Runner-up
Chayce Beckham	24	Apple Valley, California	19	Winner
Allegra Miles	18	Saint John, U.S. Virgin Islands	20	12th-14th
Ava Maybee	20	Los Angeles, California	20	12th-14th
Dan Marshall	24	Chesapeake, Virginia	20	12th-14th
Tristen Gressett	17	Pell City, Alabama	20	11th
Emyrson Flora	16	Cleveland, Ohio	20	8th-10th
Lady K.	25	Tuskegee, Alabama	20	8th-10th
Mike Parker	27	Warrenton, Virginia	20	8th-10th
Christian Guardino	21	Patchogue, New York	20	6th-7th
Jay	23	Salisbury, Maryland	20	6th-7th
Fritz Hager	22	Tyler, Texas	20	4th-5th
Nicolina	18	Toronto, Ontario, Canada	20	4th-5th
Leah Marlene	20	Normal, Illinois	20	3rd
HunterGirl	23	Winchester, Tennessee	20	Runner-up
Noah Thompson	21	Louisa, Kentucky	20	Winner
Lucy Love	28	Holly Grove, Arkansas	21	11th-12th
Nutsa	25	Tbilisi, Georgia	21	11th-12th
Marybeth Byrd	21	Armorel, Arkansas	21	9th-10th
Tyson Venegas	17	Vancouver, British Columbia, Canada	21	9th-10th
Haven Madison	16	Clarksville, Tennessee	21	6th-8th
Oliver Steele	25	Mount Juliet, Tennessee	21	6th-8th
Warren Peay	24	Bamberg, South Carolina	21	6th-8th
Wé Ani	23	New York City, New York	21	4th-5th
Zachariah Smith	19	Amory, Mississippi	21	4th-5th
Colin Stough	18	Amory, Mississippi	21	3rd
Megan Danielle	20	Douglasville, Georgia	21	Runner-up
Iam Tongi	18	Kahuku, Hawaii	21	Winner
Jordan Anthony	19	Perth, Australia	22	13th-14th
Nya	28	New York City, New York	22	13th-14th
Jayna Elise	22	Washington, D.C.	22	11th-12th
Roman Collins	24	Long Beach, California	22	11th-12th
KAYKO	23	Fort Lauderdale, Florida	22	9th-10th
Mia Matthews	19	Centre, Alabama	22	9th-10th
Kaibrienne	20	Henefer, Utah	22	8th
Julia Gagnon	21	Cumberland, Maine	22	6th-7th
McKenna Faith Breinholt	25	Gilbert, Arizona	22	6th-7th
Emmy Russell	25	Nashville, Tennessee	22	4th-5th
Triston Harper	15	McIntosh, Alabama	22	4th-5th
Jack Blocker	25	Dallas, Texas	22	3rd
Will Moseley	23	Hazlehurst, Georgia	22	Runner-up
Abi Carter	21	Indio, California	22	Winner
Amanda Barise	26	New York City, New York	23	13th-14th
Desmond Roberts	26	Corona, California	23	13th-14th
Ché	28	Essex, England	23	11th-12th
Filo	23	Dublin, California	23	11th-12th
Canaan James Hill	17	Dallas, Texas	23	9th-10th
Kolbi Jordan	26	Tulsa, Oklahoma	23	9th-10th
Josh King	24	Charlotte, North Carolina	23	8th
Gabby Samone	22	Baltimore, Maryland	23	6th-7th
Mattie Pruitt	16	Eagleville, Tennessee	23	6th-7th
Slater Nalley	17	Atlanta, Georgia	23	4th-5th
Thunderstorm Artis	29	Haleʻiwa, Hawaii	23	4th-5th
Breanna Nix	25	Denton, Texas	23	3rd
John Foster	18	Addis, Louisiana	23	Runner-up
Jamal Roberts	27	Meridian, Mississippi	23	Winner
Jake Thistle	21	Paramus, New Jersey	24	13th-14th
Julián Kalel	19	El Paso, Texas	24	13th-14th
Jesse Findling	19	Massapequa Park, New York	24	12th
Philmon Lee	25	LaGrange, Georgia	24	10th-11th
Rae	24	Frederick, Maryland	24	10th-11th
Kyndal Inskeep	29	Fishers, Indiana	24	8th-9th
Lucas Leon	18	Gallatin, Tennessee	24	8th-9th
Brooks	22	Bel Air, Maryland	24	6th-7th
Daniel Stallworth	27	Moss Point, Mississippi	24	6th-7th
Braden Rumfelt	22	Murphy, North Carolina	24	4th-5th
Chris Tungseth	27	Fergus Falls, Minnesota	24	4th-5th
Keyla Richardson	29	Pensacola, Florida	24	3rd
Jordan McCullough	27	Murfreesboro, Tennessee	24	Runner-up
Hannah Harper	25	Willow Springs, Missouri	24	Winner

== Notes ==
- Contestant's age at the time the season's final round began.
