= Lee Williams and the Spiritual QC's =

American gospel musical group

Lee Williams and The Spiritual QCs
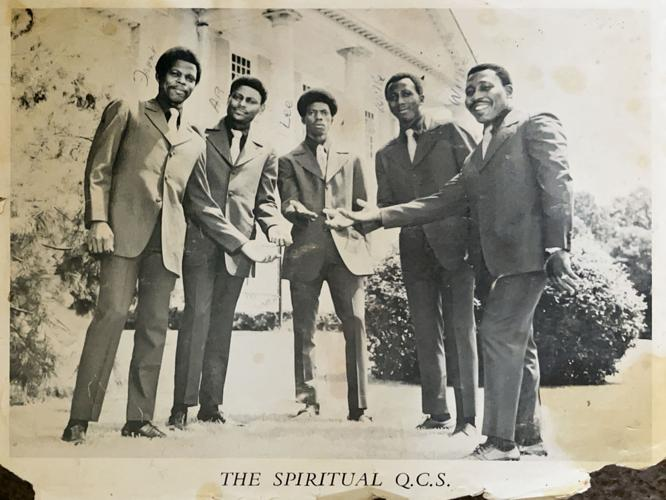

Background information
- Origin: Tupelo, Mississippi, United States
- Genre: Gospel
- Years active: 1968–2018
- Spinoffs: The Spiritual QCs
- Past members: Lee Williams; Al Hollis; Patrick Hollis; Leonard Shumpert; Tommie Harris; Willie Ligon; Roger McKinney
- Website: www.spiritualqcs.com

Lee Williams and The Spiritual QCs (Qualified Christians) was an American quartet gospel group originating from Tupelo, Mississippi, which has been in existence since 1968.

The group started recording around 1970. The gospel quartet included Lee Williams as lead singer, Al Hollis as guitarist and background vocal, Patrick Hollis as background singer, Leonard Shumpert as second lead vocalist, and new full-time bassist Tommie Harris. Lee Williams was the co-lead singer along with Willie Ligon.

== Career ==
Lee Williams and the Spiritual QCs went from being a part-time gospel group to recording artist of the year. The group's first recordings were a series of 45 rpm records on the Designer label out of Memphis, Tennessee. The singles were usually one side led by Willie Ligon and the other by Lee Williams, who was principally the group bass guitarist. After Ligon's departure from the group, Williams took over lead duties and the group name changed to include his name in front. Their first national recording was in 1990 at the Georgia-based gospel label MCG Records. "Jesus Is Alive And Well" was their first album, which included the breakout hit record "I've Learned to Lean". Their second album, "Love Will Go All the Way", was released in 1998 which included a few songs from their first album and set the stage for their third album, released in 2000, named "Good Time". This reached the Top Ten of Billboard's gospel albums chart in November.

During that following year the group won Traditional Quartet of the Year at the Gospel Music Excellence Awards, and was nominated for the Best Gospel Album at the Soul Train Music Awards. In 2002 the group recorded their fourth album titled "Right On Time" at The Temple Of Deliverance Church in Memphis, Tennessee. When recording finished, the album was released to the public in the spring of 2003. In 2005, they released their fifth album titled "Tell the Angels" in Memphis again. In 2006, they released a compilation of songs with the album's name being "Soulful Healing". In the 2000s they went to SoulLink Live! then the second one, then the third. In 2007, they released "So Much To Be Thankful For". They did a few other compilation albums including, " My Brother's Keeper", and "The Collection" in 2009. In 2009, they released their seventh album titled "Fall On Me". They let a member from the first two albums named Roger McKinney sing background vocals on "Another Chance". In 2010, they released another compilation album titled " Through The Years". In 2011, they released their eighth album titled "Living On The Lord's Side" at the Greater Travelers Rest Baptist Church in Atlanta, Georgia, which again had songs from Jesus Is Alive And Well. It had a few songs from Good Time, and a few other songs from older albums that were re-recorded in updated versions. They let Willie Ligon sing one song called "Call Him". In 2015, they made their last album, another compilation titled "Memphis Gospel, Live!"

For the rest of the group's singing, they continued to travel and work 50 out of 52 weeks of the year. During that time Lee Williams battled with dementia. In 2018, Lee Williams announced his retirement from gospel music. Lee and the group went on their farewell tour, touring all over the country. Lee Williams retired from the group in December 2018 and the group celebrated Lee Williams and the Spiritual QCs 54th anniversary and celebrated Lee's retirement on December 8, 2018. Lee Williams is often referred to as the "GOAT" of Gospel music and he and the QC's are often recognized how they changed Gospel quartet music and the impact they made also going on to be the #1 Gospel group in the world for 21 years straight. Lee Williams died on August 30, 2021. He was 75 years old. Williams' son (C.C. Williams) came aboard, and the group continues on as the Spiritual QCs.

== Discography ==
=== Studio albums ===
List of studio albums
Title	Album details	Year released
Love Will Go All The Way	Number of Tracks: 11; Formats: Streaming, CD; digital download; streaming	1996
Right on Time	Number of Tracks: 12; Formats: Streaming, CD; digital download; streaming	2003
Soulful Healing	Number of Tracks: 14; Formats: Streaming, CD; digital download; streaming	2006
So Much To Be Thankful For	Number of Tracks: 11; Formats: Streaming, CD; digital download; streaming	2007
Fall on Me	Number of Tracks: 11; Formats: Streaming, CD; digital download; streaming	2009
Through the Years	Number of Tracks: 13; Formats: Streaming, CD; digital download; streaming	2010
God's Groove! (The Remix)	Number of Tracks: 11; Formats: CD; digital download; streaming	2011
Living On The Lord's Side	Number of Tracks: 11; Formats: CD; digital download; streaming	2011
My Brother's Keeper III	Number of Tracks: 10; Formats: CD; digital download; streaming	2015

=== Live albums ===
List of live albums
Title	Music Details	Year released
Love Will Go All The Way Deluxe Set	Number of Tracks: 11; Formats: CD; digital download; streaming	1998
Good Time	Number of Tracks: 13; Formats: CD; digital download; streaming	2002
Tell the Angels: Live in Memphis	Number of Tracks: 12; Formats: CD; digital download; streaming	2005
SoulLink Live 3	Number of Tracks: 14; Formats: CD; digital download; streaming	2006
Memphis Gospel Live!	Number of Tracks: 12; Formats: CD; digital download; streaming	2015

=== Other albums ===
- SoulLink Live
- Gospel gospel
- SoulLink Live 2
- SoulLink Live 3
