= Lee Williams (gospel singer) =

American gospel musician (1946–2021)

- Born: Lee Andrew Williams; July 28, 1946; Tupelo, Mississippi, US
- Origin: Mississippi, US
- Died: August 30, 2021 (aged 75) Pontotoc, Mississippi, US
- Occupations: Singer; songwriter; philanthropist; record producer
- Years active: c. 1968–2018
- Label: MCG Records
- Formerly of: Lee Williams and the Spiritual QC's
- Spouse: Annie Ruth Williams (m. 2021)

Lee Andrew Williams (July 28, 1946–August 30, 2021) was an American gospel singer, songwriter, and philanthropist. He was the lead vocalist and founder of Lee Williams and the Spiritual QC’s, a gospel quartet that performed for more than fifty years. Over the course of their career, Williams and the group received several awards and recognitions, including Stellar Awards, the James Cleveland Lifetime Achievement Award in 2010, a Soul Train Award for Best Gospel Album, an honorary doctorate in sacred music, and local honors such as the Key to the City of Tupelo.

== Early life ==
Lee Andrew Williams was born on July 28, 1946, in Tupelo, Mississippi. He was raised in a religious household, where his parents encouraged participation in church and gospel music. By the age of seven or eight, he began singing in church congregations.

Williams was introduced early to the gospel quartet tradition. His uncle belonged to an earlier version of the Spiritual QC’s, and Williams often attended their rehearsals, where he learned about vocal harmony and performance. During his teenage years, he occasionally substituted for absent group members at local performances.

== Career ==
=== Formation of The Spiritual QC’s ===
In 1968, Williams founded The Spiritual QC’s ("Qualified Christian Singers") in Tupelo, assuming leadership after the original group disbanded. The group recorded several 45 rpm singles on the Designer label in Memphis.

=== Rise to prominence ===
The group’s first nationally released album, Jesus Is Alive and Well (1996), included the track “I’ve Learned to Lean.” Subsequent albums, Love Will Go All the Way (1998) and Good Time (2000), achieved wider recognition, with Good Time reaching the Billboard Gospel Top Ten. The group’s recordings earned several honors, including Traditional Quartet of the Year awards and nominations from the Soul Train Music Awards.

=== Retirement ===
Williams retired in 2018 due to health issues related to dementia. His retirement was marked by a farewell tour and a public event held in Tupelo.

== Death ==
Williams died at his home in Pontotoc, Mississippi, on August 30, 2021, at the age of 75. The group announced, "our fearless leader" had passed at 75, and tributes praised his impact and legacy.

== Awards and honors ==
Lee Williams and the Spiritual QC’s received numerous accolades:

- Soul Train Award for Best Gospel Album.
- Stellar Awards
- James Cleveland Lifetime Achievement Award (2010).
- Honorary Doctorate of Sacred Music from Bible Believers Christian College (2016).
- Celebrated with the key to the city of Tupelo during his retirement in 2018.
