= Breanna Nix =

American musician (born 1999)

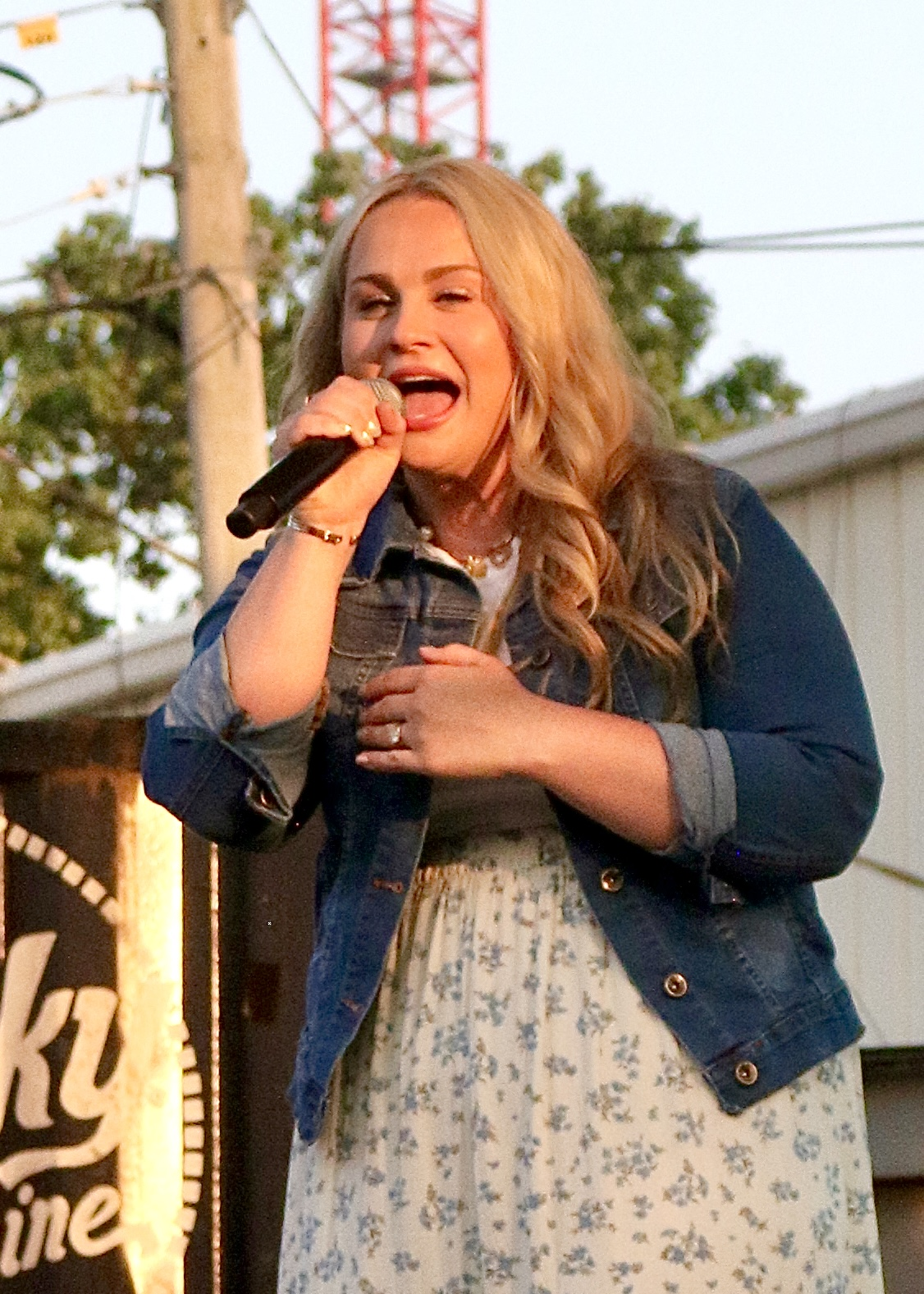
- Nix performs at the 2025 19/Idol/BMG CMA Fest Takeover in Nashville, TN.

Background information
- Born: August 7, 1999 (age 26); Odessa, Texas
- Origin: Denton, Texas
- Genres: Pop; alternative pop; Christian; gospel
- Years active: 2025–present
- Labels: 19 Recordings; BMG
- Spouse: Austin Nix (m. 2019)

Breanna Nix (born August 7, 1999) is an American alternative pop musician and Season 23 American Idol finalist from Denton, Texas.

== Personal life ==
Nix was born on August 7, 1999 in Odessa, Texas, to John and Tammie Lynn Fisher. On October 12, 2019, she and Austin Nix were married. They have one son, Emerson. Nix says that her influences musically are Carrie Underwood, Kelly Clarkson, Whitney Houston, George Strait, Adele, Lauren Daigle, Danny Gokey, CeCe Winans, and Cody Johnson. In addition, she listens to Elevation Worship artists and Brandon Lake. As part of the Top 24 she sang Still Rolling Stones by Daigle. Her mother, Tammie Lynn Fisher, was a member of a family music trio. Nix began leading worship at her church at 12.

== American Idol ==
In 2025, Nix competed in the twenty-third season of American Idol. She placed third, following Jamal Roberts in first and John Foster in second place.

=== Performances and results ===
American Idol season 23 performances and results
Episode	Theme	Song choice	Original artist	Order number	Result
Audition (March 9)	Contestant’s Choice	"Jesus Take The Wheel"	Carrie Underwood	N/A	Advanced
Top 144 — Idol Arena (March 31)	Contestant’s Choice	"You Say"	Lauren Daigle	N/A	Advanced
Top 62 — Showstoppers (April 6)	Contestant’s Choice	"The Trouble with Love Is"	Kelly Clarkson	N/A	Advanced
Top 46 — Head to Head (April 7)	Contestant’s Choice	"Gratitude" (vs. Rylie O’Neil)	Brandon Lake	N/A	Advanced
Top 24 — Sunday, Part 1 (April 13)	Contestant’s Choice	"Still Rolling Stones"	Lauren Daigle	9	Advanced
Top 20 (April 20 – Voting)	Easter Sunday — Songs of Faith	"Up to the Mountain"	Patty Griffin	11	Advanced
Top 20 (April 21 – Results)	Victory/WildCard Songs	"The Show Must Go On"	Queen	14	Advanced
Top 14 (April 27)	Rock & Roll Hall of Fame	"Open Arms"	Journey	11	Advanced
Top 12 (April 28)	Iconic American Idol Moments	"Tell Your Heart to Beat Again"	Danny Gokey	10	Advanced
Top 10 (May 4)	Ladies' Night	"Water Under the Bridge"	Adele	4	Advanced
Top 8 (May 5)	Judges' Song Contest	"Independence Day" (selected by Luke Bryan)	Martina McBride	1	Advanced
Top 8 (May 5)	Judges' Song Contest	"Something in the Water" (with Mattie Pruitt)	Carrie Underwood	3	Advanced
Top 7 (May 11)	Disney Night #1 / Mother's Day Tributes	"Reflection" (from Mulan)	Lea Salonga	3	Advanced
Top 7 (May 11)	Disney Night #1 / Mother's Day Tributes	"Like My Mother Does"	Lauren Alaina	8	Advanced
Top 5 (May 12)	Disney Night #2	"This Will Be" (from The Parent Trap)	Natalie Cole	4	Advanced
Top 5 (May 12)	Disney Night #2	"You'll Be in My Heart" (from Tarzan)	Phil Collins	9	Advanced
Top 3 — Grand Finale (May 18)	Jelly Roll's Choice / Hometown Dedication / Winner's Single	"In Jesus Name (God of Possible)"	Katy Nichole	3	Third place
Top 3 — Grand Finale (May 18)	Jelly Roll's Choice / Hometown Dedication / Winner's Single	"The Climb"	Miley Cyrus	6	Third place

== Career ==
=== Post-Idol career (2025–present) ===
Nix released her debut single, a cover of Toby Lightman's "Higher", on May 18, 2025. Selling 5,000 copies within its first four days of release, the song debuted at No. 4 on the Billboard Digital Song Sales chart. Additionally, it reached No. 40 on the Hot Christian Songs chart, and topped the Christian Digital Song Sales chart. On the iTunes country songs chart, the song debuted at No. 1.

Nix was featured on a live recording of "Daddy's DNA" by Brandon Lake. The recording appeared on the deluxe edition of Lake's studio album, King of Hearts, released on June 16, 2025.

== Discography ==
=== Singles ===
Title	Year	Peak chart positions			Album
Title	Year	US	US Christ	US Christ Digital	Album
"Higher" (Toby Lightman cover)	2025	— (Note: "Higher" did not enter the Billboard Hot 100, but peaked at No. 4 on the Billboard Digital Song Sales)	40	1	Non-album singles
"Another Mile"	2025	—	—	—	Non-album singles
"—" denotes a recording that did not chart or was not released in that territory.

=== Other appearances ===
Title	Year	Album
"Daddy's DNA" (with Brandon Lake)	2025	King of Hearts: Deluxe Edition
"—" denotes a recording that did not chart or was not released in that territory.
