= Jamal Roberts =

American singer (born 1997)

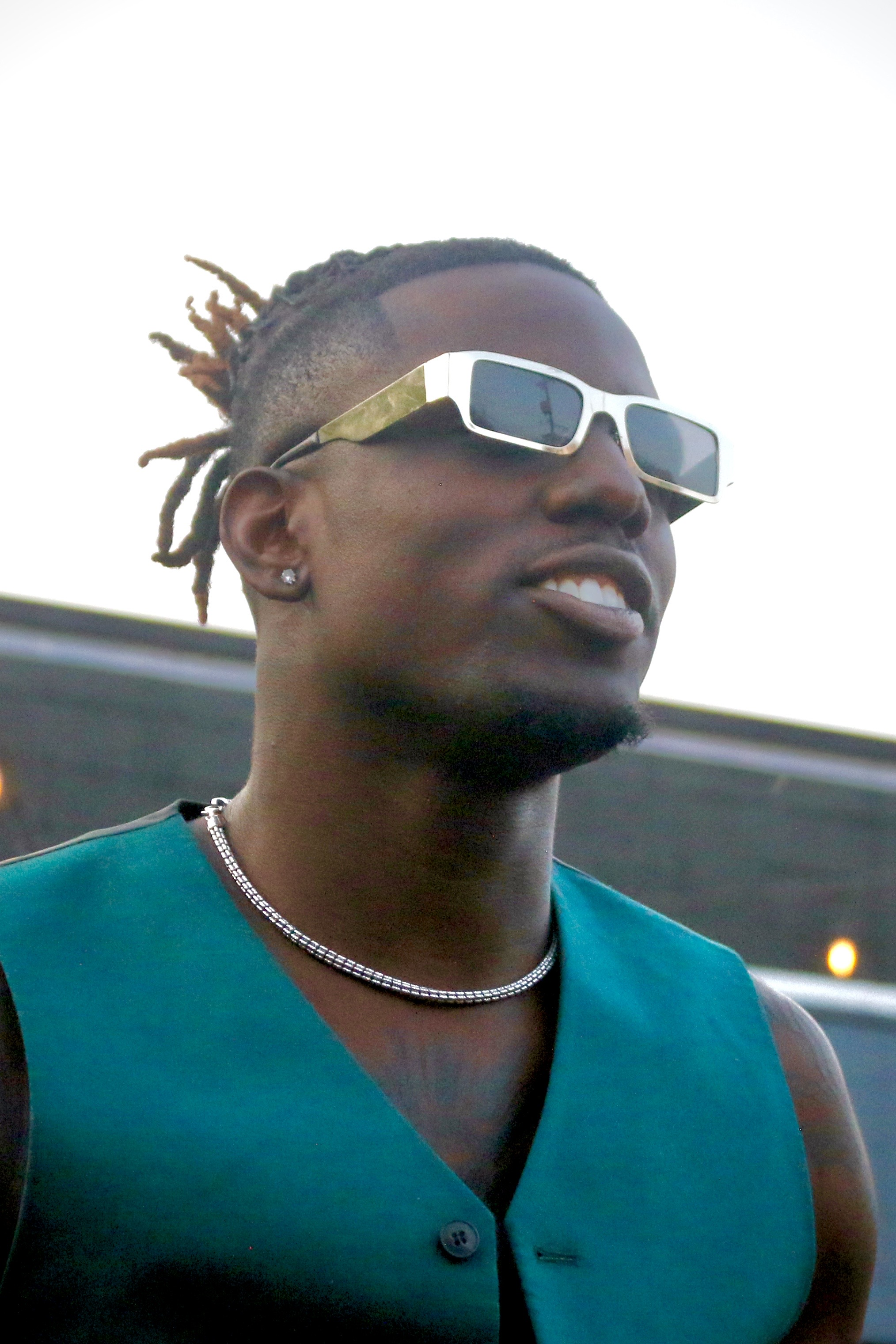
- Roberts en route to the stage to perform at the 2025 19/Idol/BMG CMA Fest Takeover in Nashville

Background information
- Born: Jamal Roberts; November 6, 1997 (age 28); Meridian, Mississippi, U.S.
- Genres: Pop music; rhythm and blues; gospel music
- Occupation: Singer

Jamal Roberts (born November 6, 1997) is an American singer from Meridian, Mississippi. He rose to prominence as the winner of the twenty-third season of American Idol. In doing so, he became the second African American male winner in the show's history. Following Idol, he released a cover of "Heal" by Tom Odell, which reached number one on the Billboard Hot Gospel Songs chart. Roberts was nominated for a Grammy Award for Best Gospel Performance/Song for the live version of his song "Still," a collaboration with Jonathan McReynolds.

== Background ==
Roberts is the father of three girls, and a physical education (P.E.) coach at Crestwood Elementary School in Meridian, Mississippi. When asked by Billboard what it is like to be a father, he said it is "the best thing that ever happened to me. They're [his children] very sensitive, especially with their daddy... you learn how to treat this one without making this one feel jealous."

In addition to being an usher and singing in his church choir, he is also a drummer. His grandparents discovered that he could sing and encouraged him to perform in church. His paternal grandfather was a bishop and his maternal grandfather was a deacon. In 2020, Roberts was a contestant on Sunday Best, a BET gospel music competition series in which he finished in the top three for the season.

== Career ==
=== 2025-present: American Idol and touring ===
Roberts auditioned for the show twice before. During the second season for which he auditioned, he was asked to perform a second song but had only prepared one. His influences include The Temptations, David Ruffin, Jamie Foxx, B.B. King, Michael Jackson, Al Green, Marvin Sapp, Daryl Coley, and gospel singer Lee Williams of Lee Williams and the Spiritual QC's. Roberts reflected on what advice he would give to contestants on Idol: "Go with your first mind (meaning to avoid being indecisive, but follow your instinct). Anything that you do, do your best."

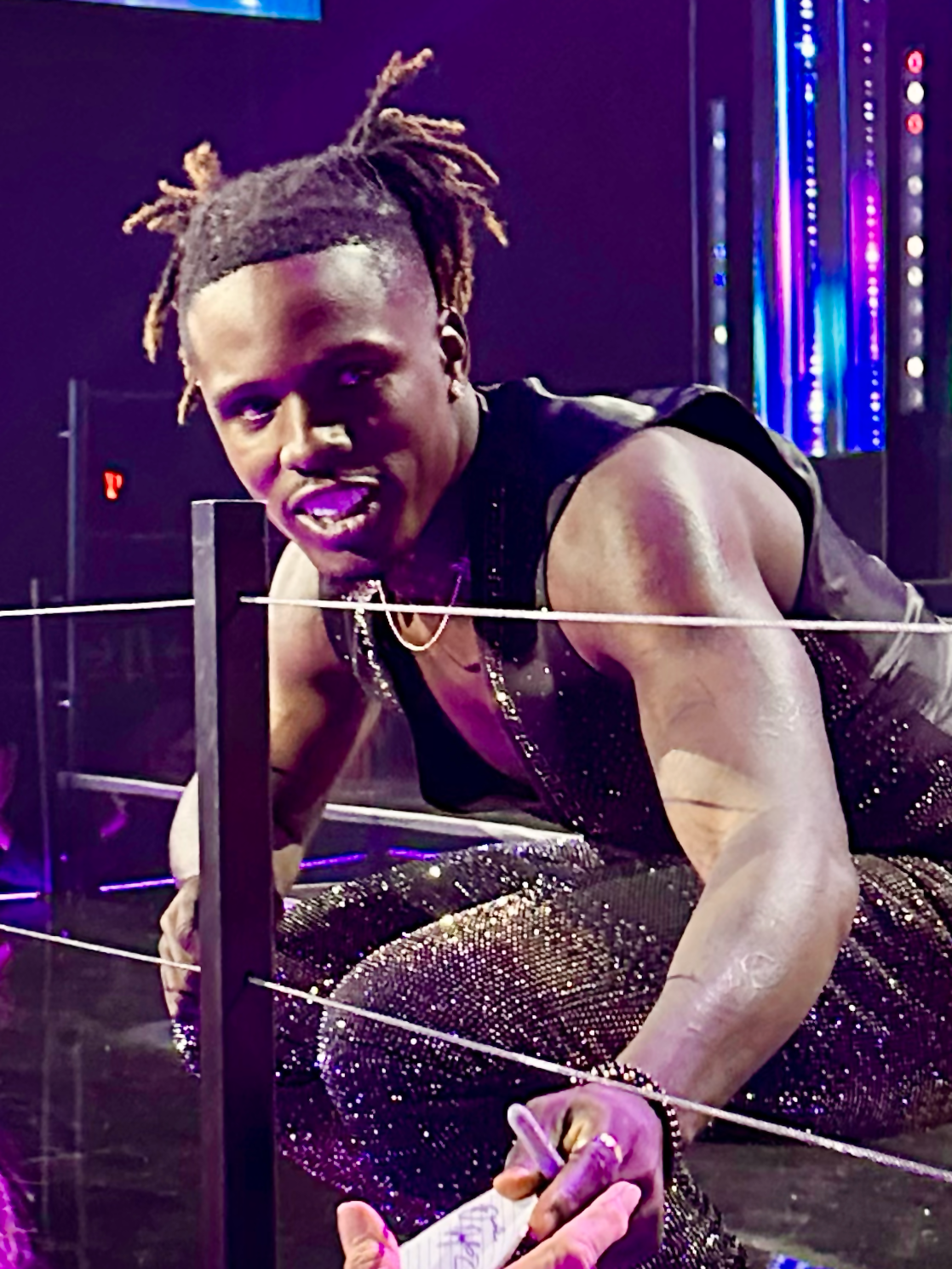
Roberts signing autographs for audience members at the 2025 American Idol finale on May 18, 2025

Roberts' main strategy was to avoid being pigeonholed. He demonstrated his versatility by performing music from genres outside of his roots in soul and gospel music: "I went with Rick James... to Anthony Hamilton, to "Tennessee Whiskey," to Jelly Roll, to Disney, to Carrie Underwood. I've just been doing everything different(ly) and they haven't been able to put me in a box. I've been all over the place (stylistically)." Roberts also said he knew of American Idol judge Lionel Richie's familiarity with Rick James and wanted to highlight his diversity as an artist. Roberts has no intention of leaving Meridian, "I love my city... There’s no traffic! No waiting in line to eat! I love that in my life. I'm just going to keep singing." Jelly Roll, the in-house mentor for season 23 of American Idol, told Roberts that "Liar" was "not his own song anymore" after Roberts performed his rendition of the song in Hawaii, and that he felt that Roberts sang it better than he could while performing in the Top 24 round of the contest. Jelly Roll felt after singing a duet with Roberts that "Liar" is "Jamal's song (now) and that he was singing Jamal's song tonight".

Roberts was asked about his perspective on winning and said, "I took the 'no' (looking back at his first two unsuccessful efforts on the show). I've always been able to take constructive criticism and use it for my gain and try again." During "Iconic Idol Moments" week, Roberts performed a cover of Tom Odell's song "Heal" (which he also reprised in the finale). According to critics, the performance was reminiscent of Fantasia's 2004 breakout moment of American Idol season 3 of "Summertime". Incidentally, Fantasia was the mentor for that week. His performance of "Heal" drew in viewers and similarly went viral online. Roberts' rendition of "Heal" was released as a single on May 17, 2025. "Heal" is a cover song; however, Roberts wrote an original third verse to it, and the song represents a prayer.

Roberts won American Idol on May 18, 2025, after receiving 26 million votes—a record for the ABC version of the show and nearly double the number of votes from the previous season. He is the second African American male winner in the show's history, and the first since Ruben Studdard won in 2003. Idol judge Richie twice remarked that Roberts is "divinely guided"—first after he performed the Top 12 cover of "Heal" by Odell; and again, after a cover of The Temptations' "Just My Imagination (Running Away with Me)" during the finale.

On June 24, 2025, it was announced that he would appear as a support act for Brandy and Monica's 2025 The Boy Is Mine Tour, alongside Kelly Rowland and Muni Long; the tour is due to commence in October 2025, and finish in December 2025.

On November 7, 2025, it was announced that Roberts and Jonathan McReynolds received a Grammy nomination for Best Gospel Performance/Song for the live rendition of their song, "Still".

=== Performances and results ===
American Idol season 23 performances and results
Episode	Theme	Song choice	Original artist	Order number	Result
Auditions Episode #3	N/A	"Mary Jane"	Rick James	N/A	Advanced
Hollywood Round	N/A	"Her Heart"	Anthony Hamilton	N/A	Advanced
Showstoppers/Green Mile	N/A	"Tennessee Whiskey"	George Jones	N/A	Advanced
Top 24 — Sunday, Part 1 (April 13)	Contestant's Choice	"Liar"	Jelly Roll	12	Advanced
Top 20 (April 20 – Voting)	Easter Sunday — Songs of Faith	"Forever"	Jason Nelson	18	Advanced
Top 20 (April 21 – Results)	Victory/WildCard Songs	"Try a Little Tenderness"	Ray Noble Orchestra feat. Val Rosing	16	Advanced
Top 14 (April 27)	Rock & Roll Hall of Fame	"Shout"	Isley Brothers	5	Advanced
Top 12 (April 28)	Iconic American Idol Moments	"Heal"	Tom Odell	12	Advanced
Top 10 (May 4)	Ladies' Night	"Undo It"	Carrie Underwood	8	Advanced
Top 8 (May 5)	Judges' Song Contest	"Dancing on the Ceiling" (w/ Gabby Samone & Josh King)	Lionel Richie	3	Advanced
Top 8 (May 5)	Judges' Song Contest	"I Believe" (selected by Lionel Richie)	Fantasia	8	Advanced
Top 7 (May 11)	Disney Night #1 / Mother's Day Tributes	"Go the Distance" (from Hercules)	Roger Bart	2	Advanced
Top 7 (May 11)	Disney Night #1 / Mother's Day Tributes	"A Change Is Gonna Come"	Sam Cooke	11	Advanced
Top 5 (May 12)	Disney Night #2	"Ain't No Mountain High Enough" (from Remember the Titans)	Marvin Gaye & Tammi Terrell	5	Advanced
Top 5 (May 12)	Disney Night #2	"Beauty and the Beast" (from Beauty and the Beast)	Angela Lansbury/Emma Thompson	10	Advanced
Top 3 — Grand Finale (May 18)	Jelly Roll's Choice / Hometown Dedication / Winner's Single	"First Time"	Teeks	2	Winner
Top 3 — Grand Finale (May 18)	Jelly Roll's Choice / Hometown Dedication / Winner's Single	"Just My Imagination (Running Away with Me)"	The Temptations	5	Winner
Top 3 — Grand Finale (May 18)	Jelly Roll's Choice / Hometown Dedication / Winner's Single	"Heal"	Tom Odell	8	Winner

== Discography ==
=== Singles ===
==== As lead artist ====
Title	Year	Peak chart positions				Album
Title	Year	US Digital	US Gospel	US Gospel Digital	US Gospel Stream	Album
"He's Preparing Me"	2020	—	—	—	—	Non-album singles
"Heal" (Tom Odell cover)	2025	1	1	1	7	Non-album singles
"Mississippi"	2025	—	—	— (Note: "Mississippi" did not enter the Gospel Digital Song Sales chart, but peaked at No. 5 on the R&B/Hip-Hop Digital Song Sales chart.)	—	Non-album singles
"Nothing Compares"	2025	—	—	—	—	Non-album singles
"Head Up"	2026	—	—	—	—	Non-album singles
"Perfect for Me"	2026	—	—	—	—	Non-album singles
"Girl Dad"	2026	—	—	—	—	Non-album singles
"—" denotes a recording that did not chart or was not released in that territory.

==== As featured artist ====
Title	Year	Peak chart positions			Album
Title	Year	US Gospel	US Gospel Air	US Gospel Digital	Album
"Still" (with Jonathan McReynolds)	2025	4	1	3	Closer

== Awards and nominations ==
Year	Association	Category	Nominee / Work	Result	Ref.
2026	Grammy Awards	Best Gospel Performance/Song	"Still" (with Jonathan McReynolds)	Nominated	
2026	Stellar Awards	Duo/Chorus Group of the Year	"Still" (with Jonathan McReynolds)	Nominated	
2026	Stellar Awards	Contemporary Duo/Chorus Group of the Year	"Still" (with Jonathan McReynolds)	Won	
2026	Dove Awards	Contemporary Gospel Recorded Song of the Year	"Still" (with Jonathan McReynolds)	Pending	
