= Mattie Pruitt =

American singer-musician (born 2009)

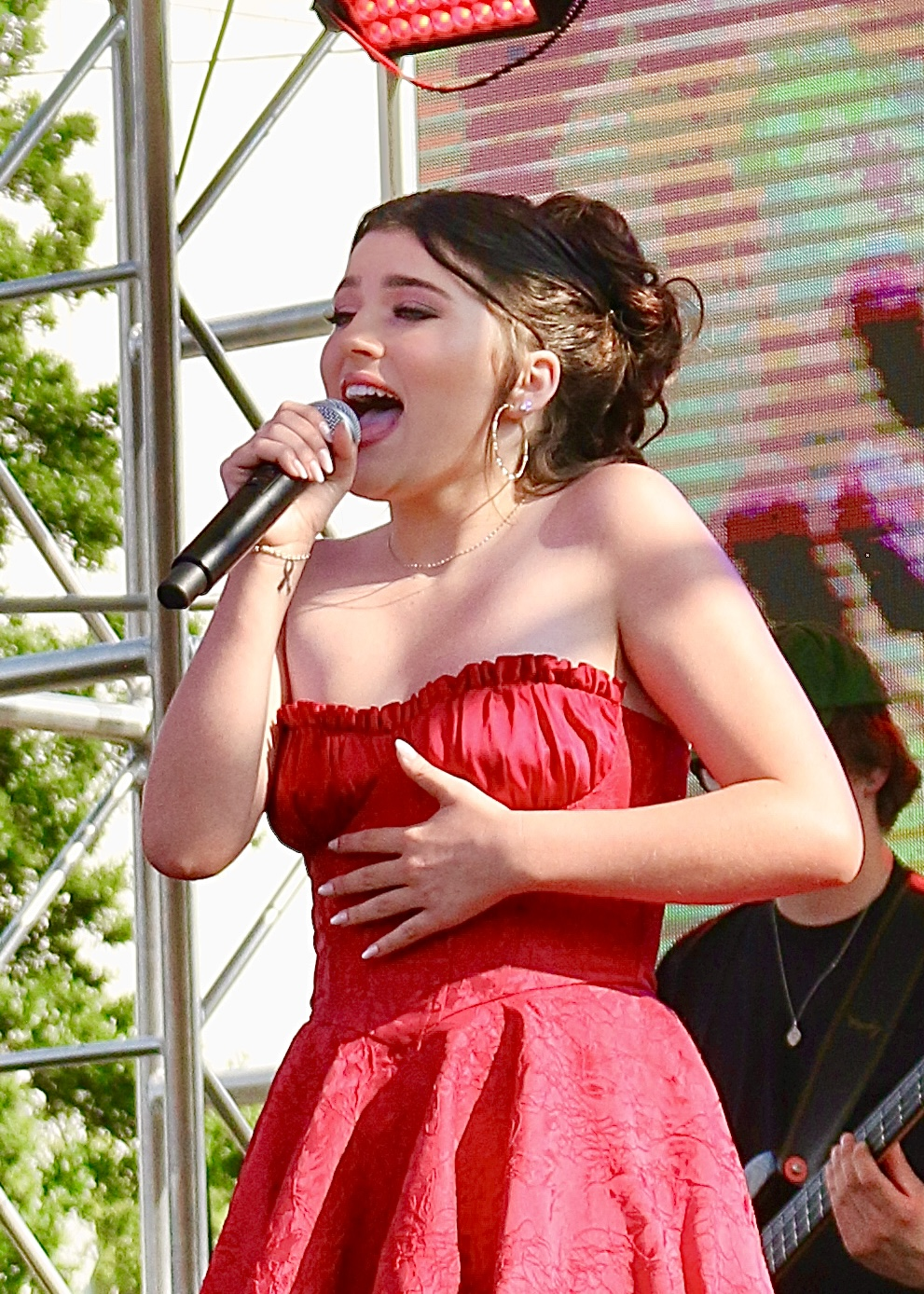
- Pruitt performs at the 2025 19/Idol/BMG CMA Fest Takeover in Nashville

Background information
- Born: Mattie Pruitt; April 15, 2009 (age 17)
- Genres: Pop music; country
- Occupations: Singer; musician
- Instruments: Vocals; guitar; piano
- Years active: 2015–present

Mattie Pruitt (born April 15, 2009) is an American singer and musician from Eagleville, Tennessee, who was a finalist on American Idol season 23. She plays guitar and piano.

== Early life and education ==
Mattie Pruitt was born to Sara Lyle and Justin Pruitt. She is from a blended family and has 12 siblings. They live in Eagleville, Tennessee, a town of 934. Justin and Eleanora (Ellie) Pruitt, Mattie's stepmother, run Middle Tennessee Traffic Management in Nolensville, a southern suburb of Nashville. Pruitt went to Barfield Elementary School in Murfreesboro, Tennessee; Rockvale Elementary School in Rockvale, Tennessee; and Christiana Middle School in Christiana, Tennessee. Lauren Alaina, who was runner-up on season 10 of American Idol, offered Pruitt some advice. Alaina told her to keep in mind that the judges have the same experiences as everyone else. Pruitt's influences include Jessie Murph to whom she refers as being a new artist, Teddy Swims, Chris Stapleton, Whitney Houston, Etta James, and Paramore. Pruitt talked about having met Jelly Roll in church; he was the in-house mentor for season 23 of American Idol.

Pruitt feels that her musical style is undefined and sometimes leans towards "classic music", which she defines as soul or country soul. She told WIS News Channel 20, "My grandparents are from there (Champaign, Illinois), my mom and all her siblings and cousins, they're all from Champaign. I visit them once or twice every year for…holidays…and along this journey, they've been really supportive." Pruitt said that her family enjoys Miranda Lambert's music; Lambert was a guest mentor for a week on season 23 of American Idol. Pruitt's mother, Sara Lyle, auditioned for American Idol when she was about 15.

Pruitt was joined on her audition for American Idol by Craig Campbell. She sang "How Could You?" by Jessie Murph. Campbell is a singer but played piano for the performance. He is a former bandmate of Luke Bryan, one of the American Idol judges. Pruitt began to post cover songs on TikTok when she was 11 and she has over 117 thousand followers there. Her snippets of songs covering Teddy Swims' "Lose Control", "Vienna" by Billy Joel, and "I See Red" by Everybody Loves an Outlaw (Bonnie and Taylor Sims) have 3.5 million, 1.8 million, and 3.5 million views respectively on TikTok. She has a version of "Rise Up" by Andra Day on TikTok which has been viewed 1.7 million times.

Pruitt said that she was so excited to meet Miranda Lambert that she wanted to cry. After being voted by the public as one of the bottom two contestants of the top 8 show, Pruitt was saved from elimination by the two judges who tied for top place in the "Judges Song Contest"-themed episode. (Note: Luke Bryan and Lionel Richie won the Judges' Song Contest in a tie, with three songs each. The judges collectively decided which bottom two contestant to save: Josh King or Mattie Pruitt. They opted to save Pruitt, thereby advancing her in the competition.) She finished in the top 7 of the contest, alongside Gabby Samone.

As of 2025, she is the youngest contestant by birth year to reach the finals of the show.

== Performances ==
American Idol season 23 performances and results
Episode	Theme	Song choice	Original artist	Order number	Result
Auditions Episode #3	N/A	"How Could You?"	Jessie Murph	N/A	Advanced
Hollywood Round	N/A	"Cold"	Chris Stapleton	N/A	Advanced
Showstoppers/Green Mile	N/A	"It's a Man's Man's Man's World"	James Brown	N/A	Advanced
Top 24 — Monday, Part 2 (April 14)	Contestant's Choice	"Wide Awake"	Katy Perry	10	Advanced
Top 20 (April 20 – Voting)	Easter Sunday — Songs of Faith	"Rescue"	Lauren Daigle	9	Advanced
Top 20 (April 21 – Results)	Victory/WildCard Songs	"In the Stars"	Benson Boone	9	Advanced
Top 14 (April 27)	Rock & Roll Hall of Fame	"Piece of My Heart"	Erma Franklin	2	Advanced
Top 12 (April 28)	Iconic American Idol Moments	"Because of You"	Kelly Clarkson	6	Advanced
Top 10 (May 4)	Ladies' Night	"The House That Built Me"	Miranda Lambert	9	Advanced
Top 8 (May 5)	Judges' Song Contest	"Always Been You" (selected by Luke Bryan)	Jessie Murph	2	Saved by the Judges
Top 8 (May 5)	Judges' Song Contest	"Something in the Water" (w/ Breanna Nix)	Carrie Underwood	9	Saved by the Judges
Top 7 (May 11)	Disney Night #1 / Mother's Day Tributes	"Remember Me" (from Coco)	Benjamin Bratt	6	Eliminated
Top 7 (May 11)	Disney Night #1 / Mother's Day Tributes	"Those Kind of Women"	Lauren Alaina	12	Eliminated

== Discography ==
=== Singles ===
Title	Year	Album
"Strings"	2026	Non-album singles
"Hit The Road"	2026	Non-album singles
"Yippie-Ki-Yay"	2026	Non-album singles
"Like Me" (with Alex Sampson)	2026	Non-album singles
