= American Idol season 23 =

American Idol
- Season 23
- Promotional poster
- Hosted by: Ryan Seacrest
- Judges: Luke Bryan; Carrie Underwood; Lionel Richie
- Winner: Jamal Roberts
- Runner-up: John Foster
- No. of episodes: 19

Release
- Original network: ABC
- Original release: March 2 – May 18, 2025

Season chronology
- ← Previous; Season 22 Next → Season 24

The twenty-third season of American Idol premiered March 2, 2025, on ABC. Ryan Seacrest returned as host and Luke Bryan and Lionel Richie came back as judges. Season four winner Carrie Underwood replaced Katy Perry as a judge.

Jamal Roberts won the season on May 18, 2025, while John Foster was the runner-up, and Breanna Nix finished in third place.

== Auditions ==
The Idol Across America virtual auditions program which began in 2020 returned and auditions were held remotely from August 12 to September 9, 2024. There were also many open-call auditions and from those, the producers selected contestants to audition in front of the judges.

The "platinum ticket" also returned from the previous three seasons. During the audition round three platinum tickets were awarded. The recipients were Kolbi Jordan, Filo, and Canaan James Hill.

American Idol (season 23) – auditions
City	Filming date(s)	Filming venue
New York City	September 30, 2024	PENN 2
Nashville	October 30, 2024	Music City Center
Los Angeles	December 2024	Calamigos Ranch

== Hollywood Week ==
Dubbed the "Idol Arena", each of the 144 contestants were chosen at random to perform a solo, and sixty-two of them advanced to the next round. The three platinum ticket recipients (Jordan, Filo, and Hill) sang. Their advantage was the ability to skip this round and they sang a bonus performance. Joining them were 59 additional contestants who cleared the Idol Arena, while the other 82 were eliminated. The "Showstoppers" round determined the Top 24 semifinalists. In a twist after the Showstoppers round, while cuts were made, the judges chose four contestants to advance to the Top 24 and the remaining 42 competed in the Head to Head round. During the round contestants had 24 hours to pick a partner and prepare a duet performance. After the duets, the judges chose 20 to be in the Top 24.

== Showstopper round ==
The Showstopper round featured the top 62 contestants performing for the judges and a live audience at the Barker Hangar. The round was filmed on January 27, 2025, and aired on April 7, 2025. The judges narrowed the number of contestants down to 46, with four advancing to the Top 24. Five contestants which made it to the Top 24 (Ché, Penny Samar, Josh King, Kyana Fanene, and Baylee Littrell) did not have their Showstopper performance aired. The next night, a new "Head to Head" round was featured where the remaining 42 contestants sang for 20 spots. Jelly Roll debuted as the "Artist in Residence" and he mentored the contestants until the winner was announced.

Among these contestants are Thunderstorms Artis & Victor Solomon, who were on The Voice Seasons eighteen and twenty respectively. They were both coached by John Legend, but Thunderstorm got stolen in the knockout rounds by Nick Jonas. Thunderstorm got third place and Victor got fifth place.

Showstopper round
Contestant	Song
Victor Solomon	"In the Air Tonight"
Mattie Pruitt	"It's a Man's Man's Man's World"
Kolbi Jordan	"River Deep – Mountain High"
Isaiah Misailegalu	"What Hurts the Most"
Breanna Nix	"The Trouble with Love Is"
Drew Ryn	"Always On My Mind"
Jamal Roberts	"Tennessee Whiskey"
Amanda Barise	"Ain't Nobody"
Desmond Roberts	"Barracuda"
John Foster	"In Color"
Zaylie Windsor	"Happier Than Ever"
Filo	"Anything Worth Holding On To"
Slater Nalley	"Ophelia"
MKY	"Sabor a Mí"
Gabby Samone	"Four Women"
Grayson Torrence	"Oscar Winning Tears"
Thunderstorm Artis	"Imagine"
Olivier Bergeron	"Like a Stone"
Canaan James Hill	"Never Would Have Made It"

== Top 24 (April 13 & 14) ==
The top 24 contestants were split into two groups of twelve and performed a song each at the Aulani resort in Kapolei, Hawaii on Oahu. The first group taped performances on February 11 which aired on April 13, while the second group taped on February 12 and aired on April 14. Ashanti was a guest mentor and judge for the first group, and Josh Groban for the second group. Two contestants from each group were eliminated based on the public vote and the rest advanced to the top 20. Contestants are listed in the order they performed.

Color key:

This contestant was saved by America's vote.
This contestant was eliminated.

Group 1 (April 13)
Contestant	Song	Result
Ché	"Master Blaster (Jammin')"	Safe
Penny Samar	"Good Luck, Babe!"	Eliminated
Kolbi Jordan	"New Attitude"	Safe
Baylee Littrell	"Happy"	Safe
Victor Solomon	"That's My Kind of Night"	Safe
Gabby Samone	"It's All Coming Back to Me Now"	Safe
MKY	"Adorn"	Eliminated
Zaylie Windsor	"Heart of Glass"	Safe
Breanna Nix	"Still Rolling Stones"	Safe
Isaiah Misailegalu	"You Can Have It All"	Safe
Slater Nalley	"Over the Rainbow"	Safe
Jamal Roberts	"Liar"	Safe

Group 2 (April 14)
Contestant	Song	Result
John Foster	"Callin' Baton Rouge"	Safe
Desmond Roberts	"Do I Do"	Safe
Drew Ryn	"I'm with You"	Safe
Canaan James Hill	"Glory to Glory to Glory"	Safe
Filo	"Who's Lovin' You"	Safe
Kyana Fanene	"I Am"	Eliminated
Olivier Bergeron	"I Am Not Okay"	Safe
Grayson Torrence	"Ceilings"	Eliminated
Josh King	"I'm Still Standing"	Safe
Mattie Pruitt	"Wide Awake"	Safe
Thunderstorm Artis	"Is This Love?"	Safe
Amanda Barise	"Defying Gravity"	Safe

Non-competition performances (April 13)
Performer	Song
Ashanti	"The Way That I Love You" / "Foolish"

Non-competition performance (April 14)
Performer	Song
Josh Groban	"Be Alright"

== Top 20 (April 20 & 21) ==
The top 20 performances aired on Sunday, April 20 and the results were revealed on Monday, April 21. The top 20 performances aired on Easter and the theme for the episode was "Songs of Faith."

Color key:

This contestant was chosen by the public to advance.
This contestant was not chosen by the public, and had to perform again for the judges.
This contestant was not chosen by the public, but was chosen by the judges as a Wild Card pick.
This contestant was eliminated.

Contestants are listed in the order they performed.

Top 20 (April 20)
Contestant	Song	Result
Canaan James Hill	"Better Days"	Safe
Drew Ryn	"Yellow"	Wild Card
Desmond Roberts	"Worship"	Wild Card
Filo	"Bridge over Troubled Water"	Safe
Josh King	"You Are So Beautiful"	Wild Card
Thunderstorm Artis	"Reckless Love"	Safe
Amanda Barise	"If I Ain't Got You"	Wild Card
John Foster	"Tell That Angel I Love Her"	Safe
Mattie Pruitt	"Rescue"	Safe
Olivier Bergeron	"Stay"	Wild Card
Breanna Nix	"Up to the Mountain"	Safe
Victor Solomon	"For Every Mountain"	Wild Card
Baylee Littrell	"Gone Without Goodbye"	Wild Card
Isaiah Misailegalu	"Give You Blue"	Wild Card
Gabby Samone	"I Am Changing"	Safe
Slater Nalley	"Soulshine"	Safe
Zaylie Windsor	"Silver Springs"	Wild Card
Jamal Roberts	"Forever"	Safe
Ché	"Redemption Song"	Wild Card
Kolbi Jordan	"Amazing Grace"	Safe

Top 20 (April 21)
Contestant	Song	Result
Kolbi Jordan	"I'm Every Woman"	Safe
Isaiah Misailegalu	"Sleepwalker"	Eliminated
Drew Ryn	"Million Reasons"	Eliminated
Thunderstorm Artis	"I Love You"	Safe
Olivier Bergeron	"It's Not My Time"	Eliminated
Filo	"Skyfall"	Safe
John Foster	"Neon Moon"	Safe
Josh King	"Never Gonna Give You Up"	Saved by the judges
Mattie Pruitt	"In the Stars"	Safe
Canaan James Hill	"Stand"	Safe
Ché	"Jealous Guy"	Saved by the judges
Baylee Littrell	"All of Me"	Eliminated
Desmond Roberts	"Titanium"	Saved by the judges
Breanna Nix	"The Show Must Go On"	Safe
Zaylie Windsor	"Still Into You"	Eliminated
Jamal Roberts	"Try a Little Tenderness"	Safe
Slater Nalley	"This Ain't It"	Safe
Victor Solomon	"Stayin' Alive"	Eliminated
Gabby Samone	"Don't Rain on My Parade"	Safe
Amanda Barise	"Ain't No Way"	Saved by the judges

Non-competition performances (April 20)
Performer	Song
Lionel Richie	"Eternity"
Luke Bryan	"Jesus 'Bout My Kids"
Jelly Roll & Brandon Lake	"Hard Fought Hallelujah"
CeCe Winans & Roman Collins	"Come Jesus Come"
Carrie Underwood	"How Great Thou Art"

== Finals ==
Color key:

This contestant was saved by America's vote.
This contestant was saved by the judges.
This contestant was eliminated.
This contestant won American Idol.
This contestant was the runner-up.
This contestant finished in third place.

=== Top 14 – Rock and Roll Hall of Fame (April 27) ===
James Taylor served as a guest mentor this week. Each contestant performed one song from inductees of the Rock and Roll Hall of Fame.

Top 14 (April 27)
Contestant	Song	Result
Filo	"With a Little Help from My Friends"	Safe
Mattie Pruitt	"Piece of My Heart"	Safe
John Foster	"Jailhouse Rock"	Safe
Desmond Roberts	"Jesus is Love"	Eliminated
Jamal Roberts	"Shout"	Safe
Amanda Barise	"I Can't Help It"	Eliminated
Canaan James Hill	"Mary, Don't You Weep"	Safe
Josh King	"The Longest Time"	Safe
Thunderstorm Artis	"Fire and Rain"	Safe
Gabby Samone	"Saving All My Love for You"	Safe
Breanna Nix	"Open Arms"	Safe
Kolbi Jordan	"You're All I Need to Get By"	Safe
Ché	"It's a Man's Man's Man's World"	Safe
Slater Nalley	"Your Song"	Safe

Non-competition performance
Performer	Song
Carrie Underwood	"Alone"

=== Top 12 – Iconic American Idol Moments (April 28) ===
Fantasia Barrino served as a guest mentor this week.

Top 12 (April 28)
Contestant	Song	Result
Slater Nalley	"Angel from Montgomery"	Safe
Ché	"Dancing on My Own"	Eliminated
Thunderstorm Artis	"The House of the Rising Sun"	Safe
Kolbi Jordan	"Over the Rainbow"	Safe
Filo	"And I Am Telling You I'm Not Going"	Eliminated
Mattie Pruitt	"Because of You"	Safe
Canaan James Hill	"Goodness of God"	Safe
Gabby Samone	"A Song for You"	Safe
Josh King	"All by Myself"	Safe
Breanna Nix	"Tell Your Heart to Beat Again"	Safe
John Foster	"I Told You So"	Safe
Jamal Roberts	"Heal"	Safe

Non-competition performance
Performer	Song
Fantasia Barrino	"Have Your Way"

=== Top 10 – Ladies Night (May 4) ===
Miranda Lambert served as a guest mentor this week. It was also announced that auditions for Season 24 were open.

Top 10 (May 4)
Contestant	Song	Result
John Foster	"Something to Talk About"	Safe
Kolbi Jordan	"The Chain"	Eliminated
Josh King	"Rolling in the Deep"	Safe
Breanna Nix	"Water Under the Bridge"	Safe
Canaan James Hill	"Love Wins"	Eliminated
Thunderstorm Artis	"When We Were Young"	Safe
Slater Nalley	"Whoever's in New England"	Safe
Jamal Roberts	"Undo It"	Safe
Mattie Pruitt	"The House That Built Me"	Safe
Gabby Samone	"I Was Here"	Safe

Non-competition performances
Performer	Song
Miranda Lambert	"Kerosene"
Abi Carter	"Burned"

=== Top 8 – Judges' Song Contest (May 5) ===
Contestants were given three songs, each selected by the judges, to pick from. After each performance, contestants guessed who picked their chosen song. Luke Bryan and Lionel Richie tied with the most song choices selected by the contestants, and were able to save one contestant from elimination.

Top 8 (May 5)
Contestant	Song	Selected by	Result
Breanna Nix	"Independence Day"	Luke Bryan	Safe
Mattie Pruitt	"Always Been You"	Luke Bryan	Saved by the judges
John Foster	"I Cross My Heart"	Carrie Underwood	Safe
Josh King	"Home"	Lionel Richie	Eliminated
Gabby Samone	"Hero"	Lionel Richie	Safe
Jamal Roberts	"I Believe"	Lionel Richie	Safe
Thunderstorm Artis	"Faithfully"	Carrie Underwood	Safe
Slater Nalley	"Atlantic City"	Luke Bryan	Safe

Non-competition performances
Performer	Song
Gabby Samone, Jamal Roberts and Josh King	"Dancing on the Ceiling"
Slater Nalley, Thunderstorm Artis and John Foster	"Huntin', Fishin' and Lovin' Every Day"
Mattie Pruitt and Breanna Nix	"Something in the Water"

=== Top 7 – Disney Night #1 & Mother's Day Tributes (May 11) ===
Lin-Manuel Miranda served as a guest mentor this week. Contestants performed a song from a Disney movie and a Mother's Day tribute. Stitch also made an appearance to surprise the Top 7.

Top 7 (May 11)
Contestant	Order	Song	Disney film	Result
Gabby Samone	1	"How Far I'll Go"	Moana	Eliminated
Gabby Samone	9	"Home"	—N/a	Eliminated
Jamal Roberts	2	"Go the Distance"	Hercules	Safe
Jamal Roberts	11	"A Change Is Gonna Come"	—N/a	Safe
Breanna Nix	3	"Reflection"	Mulan	Safe
Breanna Nix	8	"Like My Mother Does"	—N/a	Safe
John Foster	4	"Almost There"	The Princess and the Frog	Safe
John Foster	14	"Believe"	—N/a	Safe
Slater Nalley	5	"Can You Feel the Love Tonight"	The Lion King	Safe
Slater Nalley	10	"Don't Think Twice, It's All Right"	—N/a	Safe
Mattie Pruitt	6	"Remember Me"	Coco	Eliminated
Mattie Pruitt	12	"Those Kind of Women"	—N/a	Eliminated
Thunderstorm Artis	7	"Colors of the Wind"	Pocahontas	Safe
Thunderstorm Artis	13	"Out of the Blue"	—N/a	Safe

=== Top 5 – Disney Night #2: Heroes & Villains (May 12) ===
Top 5 (May 12)
Contestant	Order	Song	Disney film	Result
Slater Nalley	1	"You've Got a Friend in Me"	Toy Story	Eliminated
Slater Nalley	6	"Born to Be Wild"	D3: The Mighty Ducks	Eliminated
John Foster	2	"The Bare Necessities"	The Jungle Book	Safe
John Foster	8	"Rainbow Connection"	The Muppet Movie	Safe
Thunderstorm Artis	3	"A Dream Is a Wish Your Heart Makes"	Cinderella	Eliminated
Thunderstorm Artis	7	"Find Yourself"	Cars	Eliminated
Breanna Nix	4	"This Will Be"	The Parent Trap	Safe
Breanna Nix	9	"You'll Be in My Heart"	Tarzan	Safe
Jamal Roberts	5	"Ain't No Mountain High Enough"	Remember the Titans	Safe
Jamal Roberts	10	"Beauty and the Beast"	Beauty and the Beast	Safe

Non-competition performance
Performer	Song
Iam Tongi	"Hawaiian Roller Coaster Ride" (from Lilo & Stitch)

=== Top 3 – Finale (May 18) ===
The first round of songs were chosen by Jelly Roll, based on a list of each contestants' favorite songs (according to host Ryan Seacrest during the telecast). The 2nd round songs were selected by the contestants as dedications to their hometowns, shown after their hometown visits. After Nix had been eliminated and finished in 3rd place, the remaining two performed their intended winner's singles in the final round, after which Roberts was announced as the winner.

Top 3 (May 18)
Contestant	Order	Song	Result
John Foster	1	"Courtesy of the Red, White and Blue (The Angry American)"	Runner-up
John Foster	4	"Take Me Home, Country Roads"	Runner-up
John Foster	7	"Tell That Angel I Love Her"	Runner-up
Jamal Roberts	2	"First Time"	Winner
Jamal Roberts	5	"Just My Imagination (Running Away with Me)"	Winner
Jamal Roberts	8	"Heal"	Winner
Breanna Nix	3	"In Jesus Name (God of Possible)"	Third place
Breanna Nix	6	"The Climb"	Third place

Non-competition performances
Performer	Song
Top 3	"We Are the Champions"
Salt-N-Pepa	"Push It"
Top 14 Females with Salt-N-Pepa	"Shoop" / "Whatta Man"
Good Charlotte	"The Anthem"
Top 14 Males with Good Charlotte	"Lifestyles of the Rich and Famous"
Luke Bryan	"Country Song Came On"
John Foster with Luke Bryan	"Deeper Than the Holler"
Canaan James Hill with Kirk Franklin	"Melodies from Heaven" / "Love Theory"
Mattie Pruitt with Goo Goo Dolls	"Iris"
Breanna Nix with Brandon Lake	"Daddy's DNA"
Gabby Samone with Jennifer Holliday	"I Am Changing"
Jamal Roberts with Jelly Roll	"Unpretty" / "Liar"
Myles Smith	"Nice to Meet You"
Ché & Filo with Myles Smith	"Stargazing"
Amanda Barise with PJ Morton	"How Deep Is Your Love"
Kolbi Jordan with Patti LaBelle	"Lady Marmalade"
Slater Nalley with Carrie Underwood & Cody Johnson	"I'm Gonna Love You"
Thunderstorm Artis with The War and Treaty	"Hey Driver"
Jessica Simpson	"Blame Me"
Josh King with Jessica Simpson	"These Boots Are Made for Walkin'"
Lionel Richie, Carrie Underwood & Luke Bryan	"Stuck on You"
Jamal Roberts	"Her Heart"

== Elimination chart ==
Color key:

Winner
Runner-up
Third place
Did not perform
Saved by the public
Saved by the judges
Eliminated

American Idol (season 23) - Eliminations
Contestant	Pl.	Top 24		Top 20	Top 14	Top 12	Top 10	Top 8	Top 7	Top 5	Finale
Contestant	Pl.	4/13	4/14	4/20	4/27	4/28	5/4	5/5	5/11	5/12	5/18
Jamal Roberts	1	Safe	N/A	Safe	Safe	Safe	Safe	Safe	Safe	Safe	Winner
John Foster	2	N/A	Safe	Safe	Safe	Safe	Safe	Safe	Safe	Safe	Runner-up
Breanna Nix	3	Safe	N/A	Safe	Safe	Safe	Safe	Safe	Safe	Safe	Third place
Thunderstorm Artis	4	N/A	Safe	Safe	Safe	Safe	Safe	Safe	Safe	Eliminated	
Slater Nalley	4	Safe	N/A	Safe	Safe	Safe	Safe	Safe	Safe	Eliminated	
Mattie Pruitt	6	N/A	Safe	Safe	Safe	Safe	Safe	Saved	Eliminated		
Gabby Samone	6	Safe	N/A	Safe	Safe	Safe	Safe	Safe	Eliminated		
Josh King	8	N/A	Safe	Saved	Safe	Safe	Safe	Eliminated			
Canaan James Hill	9	N/A	Safe	Safe	Safe	Safe	Eliminated				
Kolbi Jordan	9	Safe	N/A	Safe	Safe	Safe	Eliminated				
Ché	11	Safe	N/A	Saved	Safe	Eliminated					
Filo	11	N/A	Safe	Safe	Safe	Eliminated					
Amanda Barise	13	N/A	Safe	Saved	Eliminated						
Desmond Roberts	13	N/A	Safe	Saved	Eliminated						
Olivier Bergeron		N/A	Safe	Eliminated							
Baylee Littrell		Safe	N/A	Eliminated							
Isaiah Misailegalu		Safe	N/A	Eliminated							
Drew Ryn		N/A	Safe	Eliminated							
Victor Solomon		Safe	N/A	Eliminated							
Zaylie Windsor		Safe	N/A	Eliminated							
Kyana Fanene		N/A	Eliminated								
Grayson Torrence		N/A	Eliminated								
MKY		Eliminated									
Penny Samar		Eliminated									

== Linear Television Ratings ==
Viewership and ratings per episode of American Idol season 23
No.	Title	Air date	Timeslot (ET)	Rating/share (18–49)	Viewers (millions)	DVR (18–49)	DVR viewers (millions)	Total (18–49)	Total viewers (millions)	Ref.
1	"Post Oscars: Auditions, Part 1"	March 2, 2025	Sunday 10:32 p.m.	0.8/13	5.91	0.1	0.74	0.9	6.69	
2	"Auditions, Part 2"	March 9, 2025	Sunday 8:00 p.m.	0.5/6	4.49	0.1	0.96	0.5	5.45	
3	"Auditions, Part 3"	March 16, 2025	Sunday 8:00 p.m.	0.5/6	4.51	0.1	1.01	0.6	5.52	
4	"Auditions, Part 4"	March 23, 2025	Sunday 8:00 p.m.	0.4/5	4.06	0.1	1.19	0.5	5.26	
5	"Auditions, Part 5"	March 30, 2025	Sunday 8:00 p.m.	0.5/7	4.66	TBD	TBD	TBD	TBD	
6	"Hollywood Week: Idol Arena"	March 31, 2025	Monday 8:00 p.m.	0.4/5	3.78	TBD	TBD	TBD	TBD	
7	"Hollywood Week: Showstopper"	April 6, 2025	Sunday 8:00 p.m.	0.5/7	5.12	TBD	TBD	TBD	TBD	
8	"Head to Head"	April 7, 2025	Monday 8:00 p.m.	0.5/5	4.15	TBD	TBD	TBD	TBD	
9	"Top 24 at Disney's Aulani Resort in Hawaii Part #1"	April 13, 2025	Sunday 8:00 p.m.	0.5/8	4.65	TBD	TBD	TBD	TBD	
10	"Top 24 at Disney's Aulani Resort in Hawaii Part #2"	April 14, 2025	Monday 8:00 p.m.	0.4/6	3.88	TBD	TBD	TBD	TBD	
11	"Top 20 Easter Special: Songs of Faith"	April 20, 2025	Sunday 8:00 p.m.	0.5/8	4.49	TBD	TBD	TBD	TBD	
12	"Top 14 Reveal"	April 21, 2025	Monday 8:00 p.m.	0.4/6	4.19	TBD	TBD	TBD	TBD	
13	"Rock & Roll Hall of Fame"	April 27, 2025	Sunday 8:00 p.m.	0.5/7	5.31	TBD	TBD	TBD	TBD	
14	"Iconic Idol Moments"	April 28, 2025	Monday 8:00 p.m.	0.5/7	4.61	TBD	TBD	TBD	TBD	
15	"Ladies' Night"	May 4, 2025	Sunday 8:00 p.m.	0.6/7	5.17	TBD	TBD	TBD	TBD	
16	"Judge's Song Contest"	May 5, 2025	Monday 8:00 p.m.	0.4/5	4.28	TBD	TBD	TBD	TBD	
17	"Disney Night #1"	May 11, 2025	Sunday 8:00 p.m.	0.6/9	5.27	TBD	TBD	TBD	TBD	
18	"Disney Night #2"	May 12, 2025	Monday 8:00 p.m.	0.4/5	4.45	TBD	TBD	TBD	TBD	
19	"Grand Finale"	May 18, 2025	Sunday 8:00 p.m.	0.7/10	6.51	TBD	TBD	TBD	TBD	
