= Gospel quartet =

The term Gospel quartet refers to several different traditions of harmony singing. Its origins are varied, including 4-part hymn singing, shape note singing, barbershop quartets, jubilee songs, spirituals, and other Gospel songs.

Gospel quartets sing in four-part harmony, with parts given to a tenor, or highest part; lead, which usually takes the melody; baritone, which blends the sounds and adds richness; and the bass, or lowest part. It is not uncommon for some quartets to switch parts between members for given songs.

Although inspired by traditional quartet groups, gospel quartets tended to highlight the experiences of conversion and salvation, and the hope of heaven.

In the 1980s, Gospel quartet music was somewhat overshadowed by contemporary Christian music and Urban contemporary gospel, but saw something of a revival in the 1990s.
