= American Idol season 17 =

American Idol
- Season 17
- Promotional poster
- Hosted by: Ryan Seacrest
- Judges: Luke Bryan; Katy Perry; Lionel Richie
- Winner: Laine Hardy
- Runner-up: Alejandro Aranda
- No. of episodes: 19

Release
- Original network: ABC
- Original release: March 3 – May 19, 2019

Season chronology
- ← Previous; Season 16 Next → Season 18

The seventeenth season of American Idol premiered on March 3, 2019, on the ABC television network. It was the show's second season to air on ABC. Ryan Seacrest continued as host, while Katy Perry, Luke Bryan, and Lionel Richie returned as judges. Bobby Bones returned as the in-house mentor, and acted as a guest host for the episode on April 8, 2019.

Laine Hardy won the season on May 19, 2019, while Alejandro Aranda was the runner-up, and Madison VanDenburg finished in third place. Hardy became the first contestant that was not scheduled to audition in the audition round to win a season of a major singing competition anywhere in the world.

== Regional auditions ==
American Idol announced in June 2018 that the Idol bus would visit 20 cities, beginning with Orlando, Florida, and San Diego, California, on August 25. Auditions could also be submitted on the official website or on Instagram, Facebook, Twitter, or TikTok. During the 2018 CMA Awards, three contestants who didn't enter the competition and didn't initially audition were given the chance to enter the competition. The contestants were Cameron Lenz, Natalie Spiroff, and Meghan Woods. The winner of that vote was revealed to be Meghan Woods on Good Morning America on November 16, 2018. However, she was not shown in any episode.

American Idol (season 17) – regional auditions
City	Filming date(s)	Filming venue
Denver, Colorado	October 2, 2018	Wings Over the Rockies Air and Space Museum
Coeur d'Alene, Idaho	October 14–15, 2018	Coeur d'Alene Resort
Louisville, Kentucky	October 22–24, 2018	Muhammad Ali Center
New York City, New York	October 29–30, 2018	Madison Square Garden
Los Angeles, California	November 8–10, 2018	Hollywood and Highland Center

== Hollywood week ==
Hollywood week aired over two episodes on March 24 and 25 at the Orpheum Theatre. It featured three rounds: lines of ten, a group round, and a solo round. In the first round, each contestant sang individually, and after ten had sung, they gathered in a line. Those who impressed the judges and the producers were advanced to the next round, where the contestants performed together in groups of four or five. The contestants who passed the group rounds performed their final solos before advancing to the Showcase round.

== Showcase round ==
The Showcase round aired on March 31, and featured the top 40 performing for the judges and a live audience at Disney's Aulani resort in Kapolei, Hawaii. The following day, the judges narrowed the number of contestants down from 40 to 20. The following is a list of the contestants who reached the top 20 and the song they performed at the Showcase. Contestants are listed in the order they performed.

Showcase round (March 31)
Contestant	Song
Alyssa Raghu	"Dear Future Husband"
Madison VanDenburg	"Who's Lovin' You"
Logan Johnson	"Sorry"
Dimitrius Graham	"Latch"
Ashley Hess	"Gone Away"
Laci Kaye Booth	"Georgia on My Mind"
Walker Burroughs	"Youngblood"
Ryan Hammond	"A Song for You"
Kate Barnette	"Royals"
Evelyn Cormier	"No Roots"
Uché	"Play That Funky Music"
Alejandro Aranda	"Yellow"
Jeremiah Lloyd Harmon	"Landslide"
Riley Thompson	"Mama's Broken Heart"
Shawn Robinson	"Rock with You"
Raquel Trinidad	"Rich Girl"
Bumbly	"Baby"
Wade Cota	"Work Song"
Eddie Island	"Don't You Worry Child"
Laine Hardy	"Come Together"

== Top 20 ==
The Top 20 performed at the Wiltern Theatre in Los Angeles. Each contestant performed one solo, and contestants are listed in the order they performed.

Top 20 (April 1)
Contestant	Song
Madison VanDenburg	"Domino"
Shawn Robinson	"Jealous"
Laine Hardy	"Bring It On Home to Me"
Uché	"Figures"
Eddie Island	"Ho Hey"
Evelyn Cormier	"Leaving on a Jet Plane"
Alyssa Raghu	"Ain't It Fun"
Ryan Hammond	"You Say"
Raquel Trinidad	"Lovefool"
Logan Johnson	"Love Don't Live Here Anymore"
Dimitrius Graham	"Hello"
Riley Thompson	"Jolene"
Walker Burroughs	"How Deep Is Your Love"
Bumbly	"Vision of Love"
Ashley Hess	"Dreaming with a Broken Heart"
Alejandro Aranda	"I Fall Apart"
Kate Barnette	"Sunday Morning"
Jeremiah Lloyd Harmon	"Make You Feel My Love"
Laci Kaye Booth	"I Want You to Want Me"
Wade Cota	"All I Want"

=== All-Star duets ===
The top 20 contestants were split into two groups of ten and each contestant performed one duet with a celebrity singer. The first group aired on April 7, and the second group on April 8. The judges then eliminated three contestants from each group, and the rest advanced to the top 14.

The artists who performed duets with the top 20 were Pat Benatar, Cynthia Erivo, Neil Giraldo, Lukas Graham, Ben Harper, Chris Isaak, Elle King, Lovelytheband, Julia Michaels, Jason Mraz, Shaggy, and Brett Young.

Bobby Bones served as a guest host for the April 8 episode, because Ryan Seacrest was out due to an illness.

Color key:

This contestant was chosen by the judges to advance to the live shows.
This contestant was eliminated.

Contestants are listed in the order they performed.

Group 1 (April 7)
Contestant	Song	Result
Walker Burroughs	"Have It All" (with Jason Mraz)	Advanced
Kate Barnette	"Heartbreaker" (with Pat Benatar & Neil Giraldo)	Eliminated
Riley Thompson	"Like I Loved You" (with Brett Young)	Advanced
Uché	"Habibi (I Need Your Love)" (with Shaggy)	Advanced
Madison VanDenburg	"We Belong" (with Pat Benatar & Neil Giraldo)	Advanced
Shawn Robinson	"Proud Mary" (with Elle King)	Eliminated
Ashley Hess	"I'm Yours" (with Jason Mraz)	Advanced
Bumbly	"Angel" (with Shaggy)	Eliminated
Laci Kaye Booth	"Mercy" (with Brett Young)	Advanced
Laine Hardy	"The Weight" (with Elle King)	Advanced

Group 2 (April 8)
Contestant	Song	Result
Alyssa Raghu	"Issues" (with Julia Michaels)	Advanced
Eddie Island	"7 Years" (with Lukas Graham)	Advanced
Wade Cota	"Broken" (with lovelytheband)	Advanced
Ryan Hammond	"Hold On, I'm Comin'" (with Cynthia Erivo)	Eliminated
Evelyn Cormier	"Wicked Game" (with Chris Isaak)	Advanced
Logan Johnson	"What a Time" (with Julia Michaels)	Eliminated
Raquel Trinidad	"Tiny Dancer" (with lovelytheband)	Eliminated
Alejandro Aranda	"There Will Be a Light" (with Ben Harper)	Advanced
Dimitrius Graham	"Love Someone" (with Lukas Graham)	Advanced
Jeremiah Lloyd Harmon	"Time After Time" (with Cynthia Erivo)	Advanced

== Top 14 ==
The Top 14 performances aired on Sunday, April 14, followed by the live results show on Monday, April 15.

Color key:

This contestant was chosen by the public to advance.
This contestant was not chosen by the public, and had to perform again for the judges.
This contestant was not chosen by the public, but was chosen by the judges as a Wild Card pick.
This contestant was immune from elimination and performed a "victory song."
This contestant was eliminated.

Contestants are listed in the order they performed.

Top 14 (April 14)
Contestant	Song	Result
Laine Hardy	"That's All Right"	Advanced
Evelyn Cormier	"The Middle"	Wild Card
Alyssa Raghu	"She Used to Be Mine"	Wild Card
Eddie Island	"Bennie and the Jets"	Wild Card
Riley Thompson	"Suds in the Bucket"	Wild Card
Wade Cota	"Trouble"	Advanced
Dimitrius Graham	"Perfect"	Wild Card
Madison VanDenburg	"Fallin'"	Advanced
Jeremiah Lloyd Harmon	"We All Fall in Love Sometimes"	Advanced
Uché	"Finesse"	Wild Card
Alejandro Aranda	"One Dance"	Advanced
Ashley Hess	"Fix You"	Wild Card
Laci Kaye Booth	"I Miss You"	Advanced
Walker Burroughs	"Climb Ev'ry Mountain"	Advanced

Top 14 (April 15)
Contestant	Song	Result
Madison VanDenburg	"Yoü and I"	Immune
Evelyn Cormier	"Dust in the Wind"	Eliminated
Walker Burroughs	"Lovebug"	Immune
Riley Thompson	"It Must Be Love"	Eliminated
Jeremiah Lloyd Harmon	"Almost Heaven"	Immune
Alyssa Raghu	"The One That Got Away"	Advanced
Wade Cota	"Simple Man"	Immune
Dimitrius Graham	"When the Party's Over"	Advanced
Laci Kaye Booth	"As Long as You Follow"	Immune
Eddie Island	"Use Somebody"	Eliminated
Ashley Hess	"Sir Duke"	Eliminated
Laine Hardy	"Hurricane"	Immune
Alejandro Aranda	"Cholo Love" (original song)	Immune
Uché	"Diamonds"	Advanced

== Top 10 contestants ==
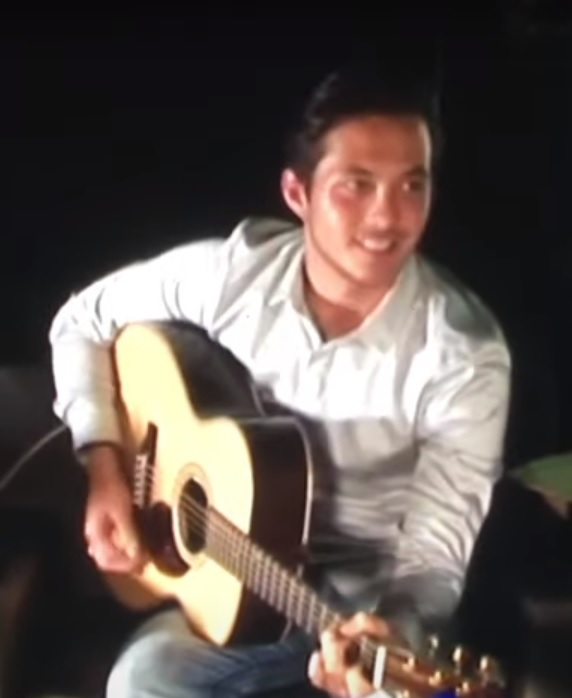
Laine Hardy

- Laine Hardy (born September 12, 2000) was from Livingston, Louisiana. He had originally auditioned for the sixteenth season, but only made it to the top 50. He sang "The Weight" in his audition this season. In Hollywood, he performed "She Talks to Angels" and "Proud Mary" as solos and "Grenade" as part of a group performance. After giving a performance of "Come Together" during the Showcase round, he advanced to the top 20.
- Alejandro Aranda (born August 11, 1994) was from Pomona, California. He auditioned in Los Angeles. He sang two original songs, one called "Out Loud" on the guitar and another called "Cholo Love" on the piano. In Hollywood, he performed in a group with Laci Kaye Booth, where he sang "Sorry" by Justin Bieber. For his final solo, he sang an original song called "Ten Years" and advanced to the top 40.
- Madison VanDenburg (born December 9, 2001) was from Cohoes, New York. She auditioned in New York with Dan + Shay’s "Speechless." She sang "Who's Lovin' You" during the Showcase round and advanced to the top 20.
- Laci Kaye Booth (born August 28, 1995) was from Livingston, Texas. She sang "Mama Tried" by Merle Haggard during her audition in Denver. In Hollywood, she sang "(You Make Me Feel Like) A Natural Woman" by Aretha Franklin. She later performed in a group with Katie Belle, Laine Hardy, and Colby Swift, where they sang "Grenade" by Bruno Mars. For her final solo, she sang "Stars" by Grace Potter and the Nocturnals. She sang "Georgia on My Mind" by Ray Charles during the Showcase round to earn her spot in the top 20.
- Wade Cota (born August 26, 1991) was from Phoenix, Arizona. He had auditioned for American Idol nine years ago, but failed to receive a "yes." He auditioned this season in Los Angeles, where he sang "Blame It on Me" by George Ezra. In Hollywood, he sang "Litost" by the X Ambassadors and an original song named "Stay" as a solo. He later performed in a group, where he sang "California Dreamin'" by The Mamas & the Papas and advanced despite forgetting the lyrics.
- Jeremiah Lloyd Harmon (born October 9, 1992) was from Catonsville, Maryland. He auditioned in New York with an original song called "Almost Heaven." He gave an emotional performance in Hollywood with "Beautiful" by Carole King and "The First Time Ever I Saw Your Face" by Roberta Flack as his solos, where he made it to the top 40. He performed Elton John's "We All Fall in Love Sometimes" during the top 14 show.
- Walker Burroughs (born September 29, 1998) was from Birmingham, Alabama, but grew up originally in Louisville, Kentucky. He auditioned in Louisville with "Love Like This" by Ben Rector and "Hello" by Lionel Richie. In Hollywood, he sang "Whereabouts" by Stevie Wonder as his first solo and "Your Song" by Elton John as his final solo. After performing "Youngblood" by 5 Seconds of Summer, he advanced to the top 20.
- Alyssa Raghu (born March 2, 2002, as Alyssa Raghunandan) was from Orlando, Florida. She had auditioned for the sixteenth season, but cut at the top 24. She took several classes to improve her skills and then auditioned again this season in Los Angeles with "Shark in the Water" by V V Brown. She sang "What About Us" by Pink as her final solo in Hollywood, where she advanced to the top 40.
- Dimitrius Graham (born June 8, 1991) was from Baltimore, Maryland. His audition was not shown. He sang "Wind Beneath My Wings" by Bette Midler as his first solo in Hollywood for the judges and his mother, who was about to have an operation, via cellphone. He then performed in a group, where he sang "I Want It That Way" by the Backstreet Boys.
- Uché (born July 15, 1994, as Uchechukwu Walter Ndubizu-Egwim-Okoli) was from Sugar Land, Texas. He auditioned with "Ain't No Other Man," and he also sang Smokie Norful's "God Is Able" and talked about his musical influences. Uché sang "Scars to Your Beautiful" by Alessia Cara as his final solo in Hollywood.

== Top 10 ==
Color key:

This contestant was saved by America's vote.
This contestant was eliminated.
This contestant won American Idol.
This contestant was the runner-up.
This contestant finished in third place.

=== Top 10 – Disney (April 21) ===
Rebel Wilson served as a guest mentor this week. Each contestant performed one song from a Disney movie. Contestants are listed in the order they performed.

Contestant	Song	Disney film	Result
Uché	"I 2 I"	A Goofy Movie	Eliminated
Laci Kaye Booth	"I See the Light"	Tangled	Safe
Alejandro Aranda	"Remember Me"	Coco	Safe
Alyssa Raghu	"Colors of the Wind"	Pocahontas	Safe
Wade Cota	"You've Got a Friend in Me"	Toy Story	Safe
Dimitrius Graham	"You'll Be in My Heart"	Tarzan	Eliminated
Walker Burroughs	"When She Loved Me"	Toy Story 2	Safe
Madison VanDenburg	"How Far I'll Go"	Moana	Safe
Laine Hardy	"Oo-De-Lally"	Robin Hood	Safe
Jeremiah Lloyd Harmon	"Candle on the Water"	Pete's Dragon	Safe

Non-competition performance
Performers	Song
Top 10 with Lea Michele	"Part of Your World" (from The Little Mermaid)
Maddie Poppe & Caleb Lee Hutchinson	"A Whole New World" (from Aladdin)

=== Top 8 – Queen & movie soundtracks (April 28) ===
Adam Lambert served as a guest mentor this week. Each contestant performed two songs: one song from the Queen discography and one song from a movie soundtrack performed as a duet with a fellow contestant. Contestants are listed in the order they performed.

Contestant	Order	Song	Result
Walker Burroughs	1	"Crazy Little Thing Called Love"	Eliminated
Madison VanDenburg	2	"The Show Must Go On"	Safe
Jeremiah Lloyd Harmon	4	"Who Wants to Live Forever"	Safe
Alejandro Aranda	5	"Under Pressure"	Safe
Laine Hardy	8	"Fat Bottomed Girls"	Safe
Laci Kaye Booth	9	"Love of My Life"	Safe
Wade Cota	11	"We Are the Champions"	Safe
Alyssa Raghu	12	"Somebody to Love"	Eliminated
Laci Kaye Booth & Laine Hardy	3	"Jackson" (from Walk the Line)	
Wade Cota & Alyssa Raghu	6	"Ain't No Mountain High Enough" (from Guardians of the Galaxy)	
Jeremiah Lloyd Harmon & Madison VanDenburg	7	"A Million Dreams" (from The Greatest Showman)	
Alejandro Aranda & Walker Burroughs	10	"Mrs. Robinson" (from The Graduate)	

Non-competition performances
Top 8	"We Will Rock You"
Avett Maness	"Bohemian Rhapsody"

=== Top 6 – Woodstock & showstoppers (May 5) ===
American contemporary Christian singer/songwriter Lauren Daigle served as a guest mentor this week. Each contestant performed two songs: one song from the 1969 Woodstock Festival, and one song that inspired them. Contestants are listed in the order they performed.

Contestant	Order	Song	Result
Madison VanDenburg	1	"Piece of My Heart"	Safe
Madison VanDenburg	7	"I Surrender"	Safe
Laine Hardy	2	"I Don't Need No Doctor"	Safe
Laine Hardy	12	"Johnny B. Goode"	Safe
Jeremiah Lloyd Harmon	3	"Swing Low, Sweet Chariot"	Eliminated
Jeremiah Lloyd Harmon	10	"Somewhere"	Eliminated
Laci Kaye Booth	4	"To Love Somebody"	Saved by the judges
Laci Kaye Booth	9	"Open Arms"	Saved by the judges
Alejandro Aranda	5	"White Rabbit"	Safe
Alejandro Aranda	8	"Poison"	Safe
Wade Cota	6	"With a Little Help from My Friends"	Safe
Wade Cota	11	"Through the Valley"	Safe

Non-competition performance
Performers	Song
Gabby Barrett	"I Hope"

=== Top 5 (May 12) ===
Each contestant performed three songs: one song chosen by their mentor, Bobby Bones, one song dedicated to their heroes, and one song from the Elton John discography. Contestants are listed in the order they performed.

Contestant	Order	Song	Result
Wade Cota	1	"You Are the Best Thing" (Note: Song chosen by Bobby Bones.)	Eliminated
Wade Cota	6	"Rocket Man"	Eliminated
Wade Cota	11	"Hard Luck Woman"	Eliminated
Laci Kaye Booth	2	"The House That Built Me"	Eliminated
Laci Kaye Booth	7	"Saturday Night's Alright for Fighting"	Eliminated
Laci Kaye Booth	12	"Dreams"	Eliminated
Alejandro Aranda	3	"No Woman, No Cry"	Safe
Alejandro Aranda	8	"Sorry Seems to Be the Hardest Word"	Safe
Alejandro Aranda	15	"Blesser"	Safe
Laine Hardy	4	"Can't You See"	Safe
Laine Hardy	10	"Something About the Way You Look Tonight"	Safe
Laine Hardy	14	"Hey Jude"	Safe
Madison VanDenburg	5	"What About Us"	Safe
Madison VanDenburg	9	"Your Song"	Safe
Madison VanDenburg	13	"Make You Feel My Love"	Safe

=== Top 3 – Finale (May 19) ===
Each contestant performed two songs before the one contestant who had the fewest votes up to that point was eliminated, thereby finishing in third place. The remaining two contestants performed one last song as voting continued. Contestants are listed in the order they performed.

Contestant	Order	Song	Result
Laine Hardy	1	"Home"	Winner
Laine Hardy	4	"Jambalaya (On the Bayou)"	Winner
Laine Hardy	7	"Bring It On Home to Me"	Winner
Madison VanDenburg	2	"Shallow"	Third place
Madison VanDenburg	5	"Breakaway"	Third place
Alejandro Aranda	3	"Millennial Love"	Runner-up
Alejandro Aranda	6	"Tonight"	Runner-up
Alejandro Aranda	8	"Out Loud"	Runner-up

Non-competition performances
Performers	Song
Top 10 with Lionel Richie	"Dancing on the Ceiling"
Carrie Underwood	"Southbound"
Margie Mays, Austin Michael Robinson & VoKillz with Montell Jordan	"This Is How We Do It"
Katy Perry & Daddy Yankee	"Con Calma"
Alejandro Aranda	"10 Years"
Adam Lambert	"New Eyes"
Dimitrius Graham with Adam Lambert	"Bohemian Rhapsody"
Dan + Shay	"All to Myself"
Madison VanDenburg with Dan + Shay	"Speechless"
Luke Bryan	"Knockin' Boots"
Laci Kaye Booth with Luke Bryan	"Every Breath You Take"
Laine Hardy with Jon Pardi	"Dirt on My Boots" "Night Shift"
Jeremiah Lloyd Harmon with Katy Perry	"Unconditionally"
Wade Cota with Weezer	"Africa"
Weezer	"Everybody Wants to Rule the World"
Walker Burroughs & Wade Cota with Weezer	"Take On Me"
Kane Brown	"Good as You"
Alyssa Raghu with Kane Brown	"Lost in the Middle of Nowhere"
Shayy with Andra Day	"Rise Up"
Uché with Kool & the Gang	"Hollywood Swinging"
Laci Kaye Booth, Alyssa Raghu & Madison VanDenburg with Kool & the Gang	"Ladies' Night"
Top 10 with Kool & the Gang	"Celebration"
Laine Hardy	"Flame"

== Elimination chart ==
Color key:

Winner
Runner-up
Third place
Did not perform
Wild Card
Immune from elimination
Saved by the public
Saved by the judges
Eliminated

American Idol (season 17) - Eliminations
Contestant	Pl.	Top 20		Top 14	Wild Card	Top 10	Top 8	Top 6	Top 5	Finale
Contestant	Pl.	4/7	4/8	4/14	4/15	4/21	4/28	5/5	5/12	5/19
Laine Hardy	1	Safe	N/A	Safe	Immune	Safe	Safe	Safe	Safe	Winner
Alejandro Aranda	2	N/A	Safe	Safe	Immune	Safe	Safe	Safe	Safe	Runner-up
Madison VanDenburg	3	Safe	N/A	Safe	Immune	Safe	Safe	Safe	Safe	Third place
Laci Kaye Booth	4	Safe	N/A	Safe	Immune	Safe	Safe	Saved	Eliminated	
Wade Cota	4	N/A	Safe	Safe	Immune	Safe	Safe	Safe	Eliminated	
Jeremiah Lloyd Harmon	6	N/A	Safe	Safe	Immune	Safe	Safe	Eliminated		
Walker Burroughs	7	Safe	N/A	Safe	Immune	Safe	Eliminated			
Alyssa Raghu	7	N/A	Safe	Wild Card	Saved	Safe	Eliminated			
Dimitrius Graham	9	N/A	Safe	Wild Card	Saved	Eliminated				
Uché	9	Safe	N/A	Wild Card	Saved	Eliminated				
Evelyn Cormier		N/A	Safe	Wild Card	Eliminated					
Ashley Hess		Safe	N/A	Wild Card	Eliminated					
Eddie Island		N/A	Safe	Wild Card	Eliminated					
Riley Thompson		Safe	N/A	Wild Card	Eliminated					
Ryan Hammond		N/A	Eliminated							
Logan Johnson		N/A	Eliminated							
Raquel Trinidad		N/A	Eliminated							
Kate Barnette		Eliminated								
Bumbly		Eliminated								
Shawn Robinson		Eliminated								

== Ratings ==
Viewership and ratings per episode of American Idol season 17
No.	Title	Air date	Timeslot (ET)	Rating/share (18–49)	Viewers (millions)	DVR (18–49)	DVR viewers (millions)	Total (18–49)	Total viewers (millions)
1	"Auditions, Part 1"	March 3, 2019	Sunday 8:00 p.m.	1.7/7	8.65	0.4	1.81	2.1	10.47
2	"Auditions, Part 2"	March 6, 2019	Wednesday 8:00 p.m.	1.5/6	7.82	0.4	1.92	1.9	9.75
3	"Auditions, Part 3"	March 10, 2019	Sunday 8:00 p.m.	1.3/6	7.27	0.3	1.57	1.7	8.84
4	"Auditions, Part 4"	March 17, 2019	Sunday 8:00 p.m.	1.3/6	7.18	0.4	1.56	1.7	8.75
5	"Auditions, Part 5"	March 18, 2019	Monday 8:00 p.m.	1.2/5	6.11	0.4	1.90	1.6	8.01
6	"Hollywood Week, Part 1"	March 24, 2019	Sunday 8:00 p.m.	1.2/5	7.08	0.4	1.74	1.7	8.83
7	"Hollywood Week, Part 2"	March 25, 2019	Monday 8:00 p.m.	1.2/5	6.45	0.4	1.85	1.6	8.31
8	"Showcase Round & Final Judgment"	March 31, 2019	Sunday 8:00 p.m.	1.2/5	7.22	0.4	1.56	1.6	8.78
9	"Top 20 Solos"	April 1, 2019	Monday 8:00 p.m.	1.1/5	6.23	0.4	1.92	1.5	8.15
10	"All-Star Duets, Part 1"	April 7, 2019	Sunday 8:00 p.m.	1.0/5	6.12	0.4	1.73	1.4	7.85
11	"All-Star Duets, Part 2"	April 8, 2019	Monday 8:00 p.m.	1.1/5	6.49	0.4	1.77	1.5	8.27
12	"Top 14"	April 14, 2019	Sunday 8:00 p.m.	1.3/6	7.26	0.4	1.65	1.7	8.92
13	"Top 10 Reveal"	April 15, 2019	Monday 8:00 p.m.	1.2/5	7.10	0.4	1.56	1.6	8.67
14	"Top 10 Perform: Disney Night"	April 21, 2019	Sunday 8:00 p.m.	1.3/6	7.11	0.3	1.40	1.6	8.52
15	"Meet Your Finalists"	April 22, 2019	Monday 8:00 p.m.	0.9/4	5.38	0.2	1.19	1.1	6.58
16	"Top 8 Perform: Queen Night"	April 28, 2019	Sunday 8:00 p.m.	1.6/7	8.74	0.3	1.58	1.9	10.32
17	"Top 6 Perform: Woodstock & Showstoppers"	May 5, 2019	Sunday 8:00 p.m.	1.2/5	7.49	0.3	1.30	1.5	8.79
18	"Top 5 Perform: Elton John / Bobby Bones' Choice"	May 12, 2019	Sunday 8:00 p.m.	1.2/6	7.87	0.3	1.34	1.6	9.21
19	"Grand Finale"	May 19, 2019	Sunday 8:00 p.m.	1.5/7	8.74	0.2	1.02	1.7	9.77
