= Laine Hardy =

American singer (born 2000)

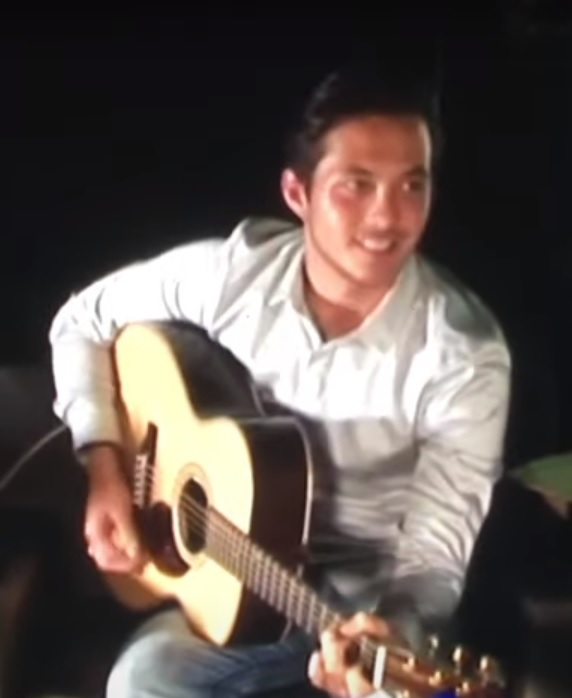
- Hardy performing in 2019

Background information
- Born: September 12, 2000 (age 26); Baton Rouge, Louisiana, United States
- Genres: Country rock; country; rock; southern rock; pop rock
- Occupations: Singer; songwriter
- Instruments: Vocals; guitar
- Years active: 2018–present
- Labels: Hollywood; 19
- Website: lainehardymusic.com

Laine Hardy (born September 12, 2000) is an American singer from Livingston, Louisiana, and the winner of the seventeenth season of American Idol.

== Early life ==
Hardy was born in Baton Rouge, Louisiana, and raised in Livingston, Louisiana. His father, Barry is a general contractor for a construction company, and his mother Cindy Lou is a real estate agent. He has a brother Kyle, and an older sister, Brittany Banta. His maternal grandmother is a Korean immigrant from Seoul. He attended French Settlement High School and graduated in 2018. He learned to play the guitar when he was eight, and by the time he was 14, he was performing in a band with his brother and cousins called the Band Hardy in local bars and restaurants. Although initially he did not sing, he was encouraged by his brother to sing.

== Career ==
=== American Idol ===
Laine Hardy first auditioned for the sixteenth season of American Idol, making it to the top 50. He did not intend to audition for the seventeenth season, but after accompanying his best friend's sister, Ashton Gill, as a guitar player for her audition, he was encouraged by judges Katy Perry, Luke Bryan and Lionel Richie to audition again. This time he made it all the way to the final and won the competition, making Alejandro Aranda runner-up and Madison VanDenburg second runner-up.

==== Performance results ====
Episode	Theme	Song choice	Original artist	Order number	Result
Audition	Auditioner's Choice	"The Weight"	The Band	N/A	Advanced
Hollywood Round, Part 1	Contestant's Choice	"She Talks to Angels"	The Black Crowes	N/A	Advanced
Hollywood Round, Part 2	Group Performance	"Grenade" (with Laci Kaye Booth, Katie Belle & Colby Swift)	Bruno Mars	N/A	Advanced
Hollywood Round, Part 3	Contestant's Choice	"Proud Mary"	Creedence Clearwater Revival	N/A	Advanced
Showcase Round/Top 40	Contestant's Choice	"Come Together"	The Beatles	36	Advanced
Top 20 Solo/Duet	Contestant's Choice	Solo "Bring It On Home to Me"	Sam Cooke	3	Advanced
Top 20 Solo/Duet	Contestant's Choice	Duet "The Weight" (with Elle King)	The Band	10	Advanced
Top 14	Contestant's Choice	"That's All Right"	Elvis Presley	1	Safe
Top 14	Victory Song	"Hurricane"	Band of Heathens	12	Safe
Top 10	Disney Night	"Oo-De-Lally" (from Robin Hood)	Roger Miller	9	Safe
Top 8	Queen Night	"Fat Bottomed Girls"	Queen	8	Safe
Top 8	Movie Duets	"Jackson" (from Walk the Line) (with Laci Kaye Booth)	Johnny Cash and June Carter Cash	3	Safe
Top 6	Woodstock	"I Don't Need No Doctor"	Ray Charles	2	Safe
Top 6	Showstoppers	"Johnny B. Goode"	Chuck Berry	12	Safe
Top 5	Bobby Bones' Choice	"Can't You See"	The Marshall Tucker Band	4	Safe
Top 5	Elton John	"Something About the Way You Look Tonight"	Elton John	10	Safe
Top 5	Mother's Day Tribute	"Hey Jude"	The Beatles	14	Safe
Finale	New Song 1	"Home"	Marc Broussard	1	Winner
Finale	New Song 2	"Jambalaya (On the Bayou)"	Hank Williams	4	Winner
Finale	Last song	"Bring It On Home to Me"	Sam Cooke	7	Winner

Non-competition performances:
Collaborator(s)	Song	Original artist
Lionel Richie and American Idol Top 10	"Dancing on the Ceiling"	Lionel Richie
Jon Pardi	"Dirt on My Boots" & "Night Shift"	Jon Pardi
Kool & the Gang & American Idol Top 10	"Hollywood Swinging"/"Ladies' Night"/"Celebration"	Kool & the Gang

=== Subsequent career ===
Hardy released a three-song EP, In the Bayou, in 2018. Later that year he released the song "Blue Christmas". Following his win on American Idol, his coronation song "Flame" was released on May 19, 2019. He performed the single on The View in May 2019. On September 20, 2019, Hardy announced his first headline tour, a 13-date tour taking place from November 14 through December 7, 2019, across the US. He released two new songs, "Ground I Grew Up On" and "Let There Be Country", in April 2020, and performed a cover of "Life Is a Highway" on American Idol in May 2020.

His single "Tiny Town" was released in July 2020, following his recovery from COVID-19. A holiday single, a cover of "Please Come Home For Christmas" followed in September. While "Tiny Town" was sent to radio, Hardy released another single "Other LA" to streaming services.

Following a couple televised performances (including the 2020 National Tree Lighting Ceremony), Hardy released a new single "Memorize You" in May 2021. The song garnered positive reviews and gained popularity after his performance on ABC's The Bachelor series. A follow-up single "Authentic" was released in July, leading to the announcement of his debut album Here's To Anyone a few weeks later. The album was released on September 17.

== Personal life ==
On April 29, 2022, Hardy was arrested by the Louisiana State University Police Department and booked into the East Baton Rouge Parish Prison based on allegations that he planted a recording device in the Louisiana State University dormitory room occupied by a woman who described him as her ex-boyfriend. The arrest warrant alleged that the device was found in a futon by the woman and her roommate, and that the woman became suspicious when he told her information about her private life that she had never disclosed to him. The warrant also alleged that Hardy, who was not an LSU student, had confessed to the woman that he bugged the room while falsely claiming that he threw the device into a pond. It was later reported that Hardy was cooperating with investigators following his arrest.

== Discography ==
=== Albums ===
Title	Details
Here's to Anyone	Released: September 17, 2021; Label: Buena Vista Records/Industrial Media's 19 Recordings; Format: Digital download, streaming

=== Extended plays ===
Title	Details
In the Bayou	Released: May 18, 2018; Label: Self-released; Format: Digital download, streaming

=== Singles ===
Title	Year	Peak chart positions	Album
Title	Year	US Digital	Album
"Blue Christmas"	2018	—	Non-album singles
"Flame"	2019	8	Non-album singles
"Ground I Grew Up On"	2020	—	Here's to Anyone
"Let There Be Country"	2020	—	Here's to Anyone
"Tiny Town"	2020	—	Here's to Anyone
"Other LA"	2021	—	Here's to Anyone
"Memorize You"	2021	41	Here's to Anyone
"Authentic"	2021	—	Here's to Anyone
