= Something's Going On (disambiguation) =

Something's Going On is an album by Anni-Frid Lyngstad.

Something's Going On may also refer to:

- Something's Going On (Trace Adkins album), 2017
- Something's Goin' On, a 2004 album by Cliff Richard
- Something's Going On, a 1994 album by Billy Eli
- Something's Going On, a 1987 album by 52nd Street
- Something's Goin' On, a 1993 album by U.N.V., and a song from the album
- "Something's Going On" (song), a 2002 song by A

== See also ==
- Something Goin' On (In Your Soul), 1997 song by Todd Terry
- "(Crack It!) Something Goin' On", 2002 song by Bomfunk MC's
