= Flame (Laine Hardy song) =

2019 song performed by Laine Hardy

Single by Laine Hardy
- Released: May 19, 2019
- Recorded: 2019
- Genre: Pop rock
- Label: Hollywood
- Songwriters: Jon Levine; Ester Dean
- Producers: Mike Daly; Jon Levine

Laine Hardy singles chronology
"Blue Christmas" (2018)	"Flame" (2019)

"Flame" is the debut single and coronation song from the American Idol seventeenth season winner Laine Hardy. The song was written by Jon Levine and Ester Dean. Hardy performed the song after he was announced the winner in the finale. The song was released following his win on May 19, 2019.

== Background ==
"Flame" was written by Jon Levine and Ester Dean, and it was chosen for him as the coronation song for the seventeenth season of American Idol. The song however is written in the pop rock genre, and Hardy said that the song is not fully who he is since he is a country singer, but he was doing it to try something new to him. He performed the song on the American Idol finale, later also performing in the Jimmy Kimmel Live!. As the song is not in the country genre, it received only limited airplay on country stations.

== Commercial performance ==
In its first full tracking week, the song sold 18,000 downloads in the United States. "Flame" debuted and peaked at number eight on the US Digital Songs chart.

== Charts ==
Chart (2019)	Peak position
Canadian Digital Song Sales (Billboard)	29
US Digital Song Sales (Billboard)	8
