= Lake Livingston State Park =

State park in Texas

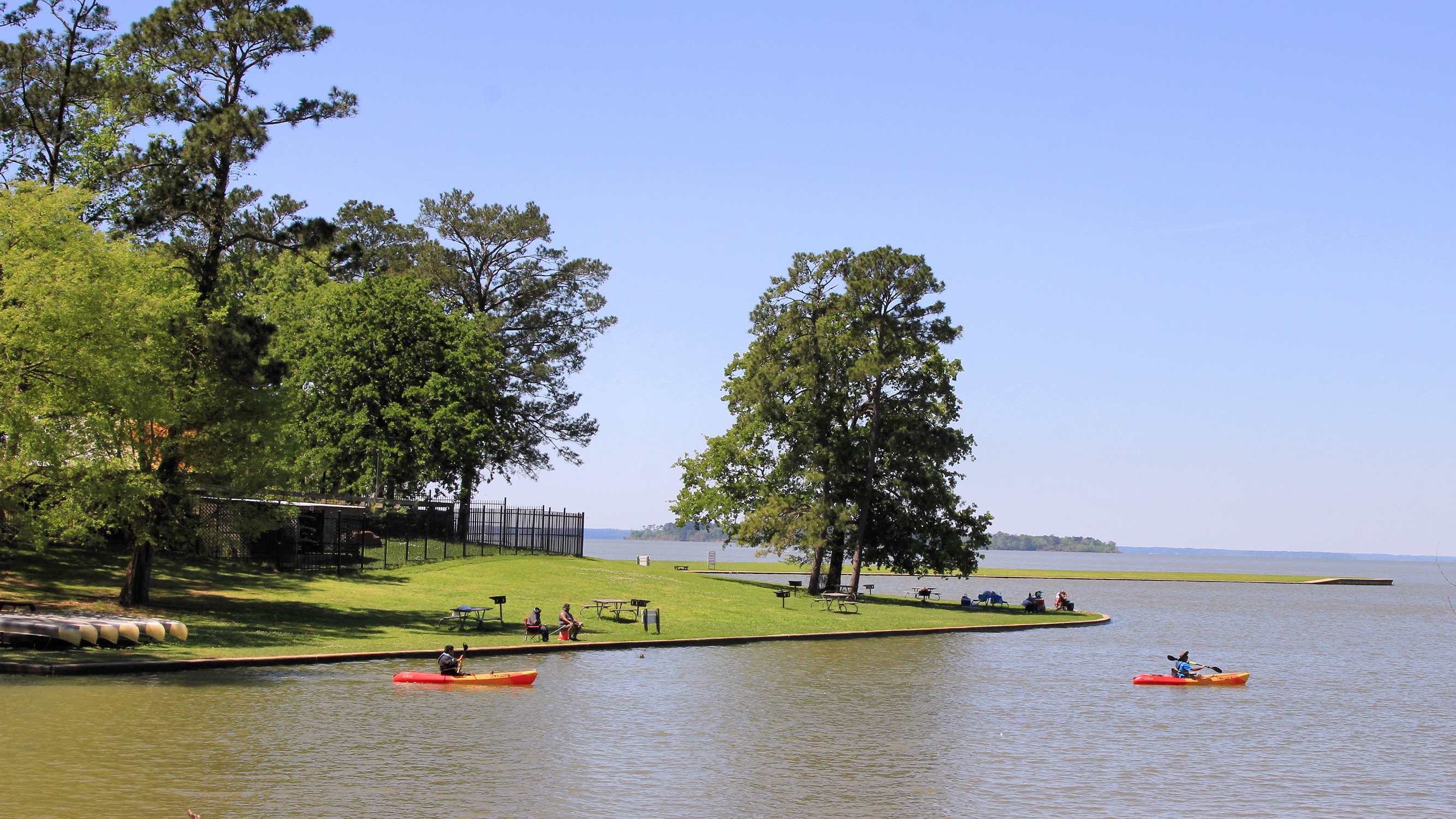
- Day use area at Lake Livingston State Park

- Location within Texas Location within the United States
- Location: Polk County, Texas
- Nearest city: Livingston, Texas
- Coordinates: 30°39′25″N 95°0′4″W
- Area: 635 acres (257 ha)
- Created: 1977
- Visitors: 170,914 (in 2025)
- Governing body: Texas Parks and Wildlife Department
- Website: Official site

Lake Livingston State Park is located near Livingston in Polk County, Texas. It is in the southern portion of the Piney Woods region of the state, an hour north of Houston. The 635-acre park along Lake Livingston opened in 1977 and is managed by the Texas Parks and Wildlife Department.

== Facilities ==
Camping

- Campsites with water
- Campsites with water and electricity
- Full-hookup campsites
- Premium full-hookup campsites
- Screened shelters
- Picnic pavilions
- Activity center

Amenities

- Park store
- Fire rings
- Water/sewer hookups
- 30- and 50-amp service
- Restrooms/showers
- Leashed pets permitted outdoors
- Picnic areas
- 3 boat ramps
- 2 fish-cleaning stations
- Pier
- Swimming

== Activities ==
- Swimming
- Fishing (rods, reels, & tackle on loan via Texas Parks and Wildlife Department's Tackle Loaner Program)
- Boating
- Rentals (Thursday–Sunday, 8:30 A.M – 3:30 P.M)
  - Canoeing
  - Kayaking (single and double)
  - Paddleboarding
- Biking
- Hiking
- Camping
- Birdwatching
- Picnicking
- Geocaching
- Ranger programs & tours
- Junior Ranger Explorer Packs on loan

== Attractions ==
- Big Thicket National Preserve
- Sam Houston National Forest
- Ball fields
- Bowling alley
- Golf course
- Tennis court
- Municipal airport
- Polk County Library and Memorial Museum

== See also ==
- List of Texas state parks

== Gallery ==
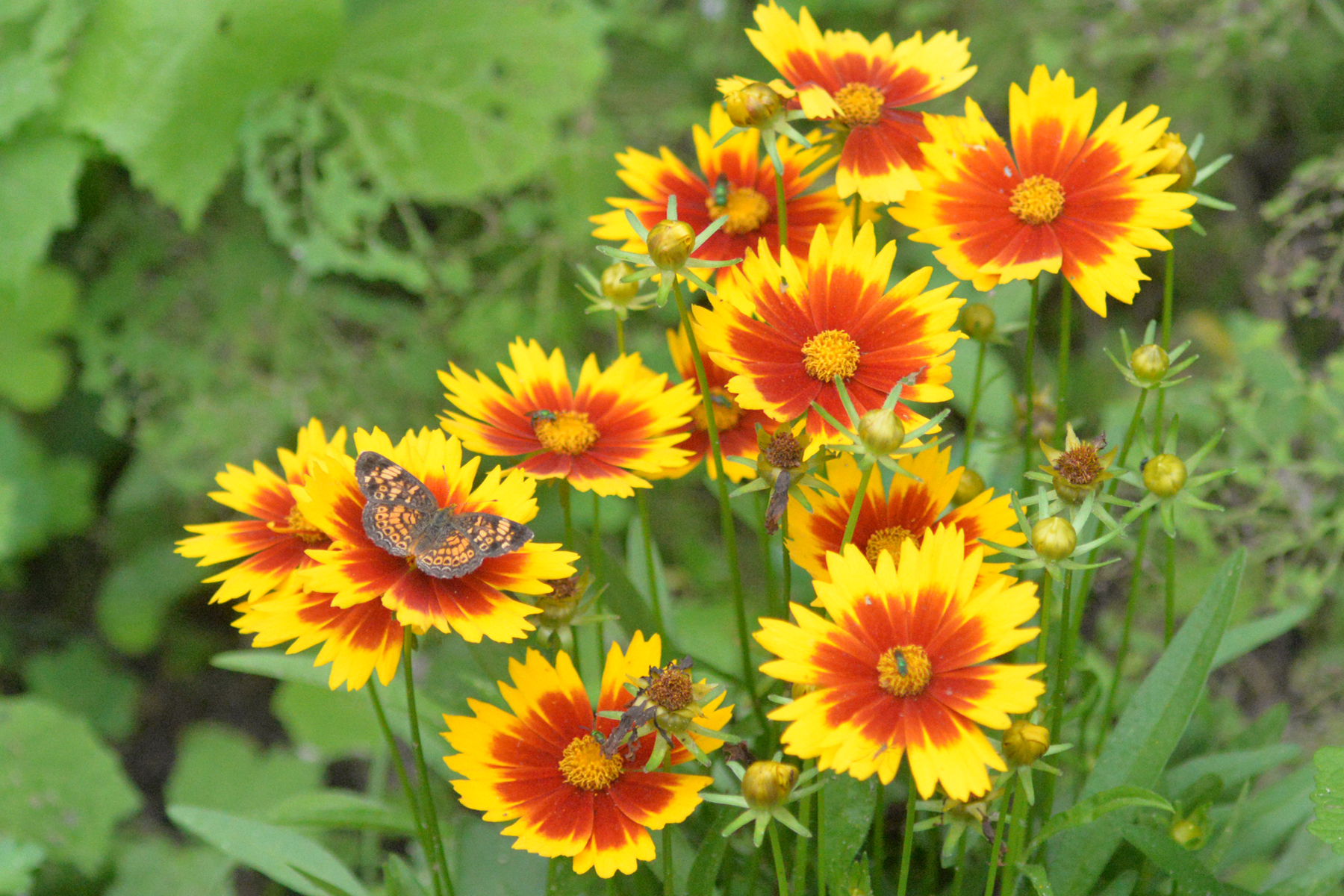
A pearl crescent butterfly on native Indian blanket flowers growing in the park.

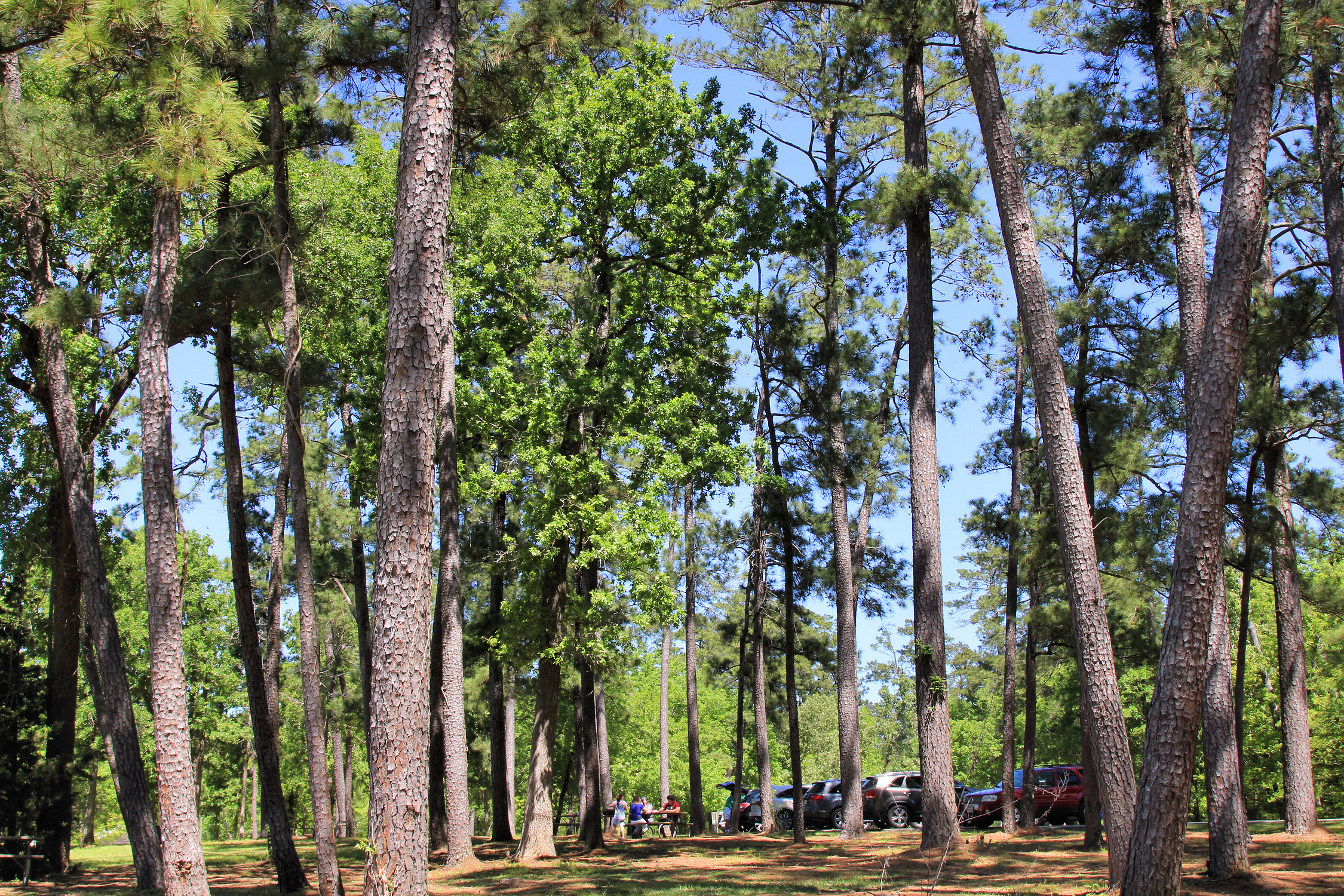
Picnicking in the tall pines.

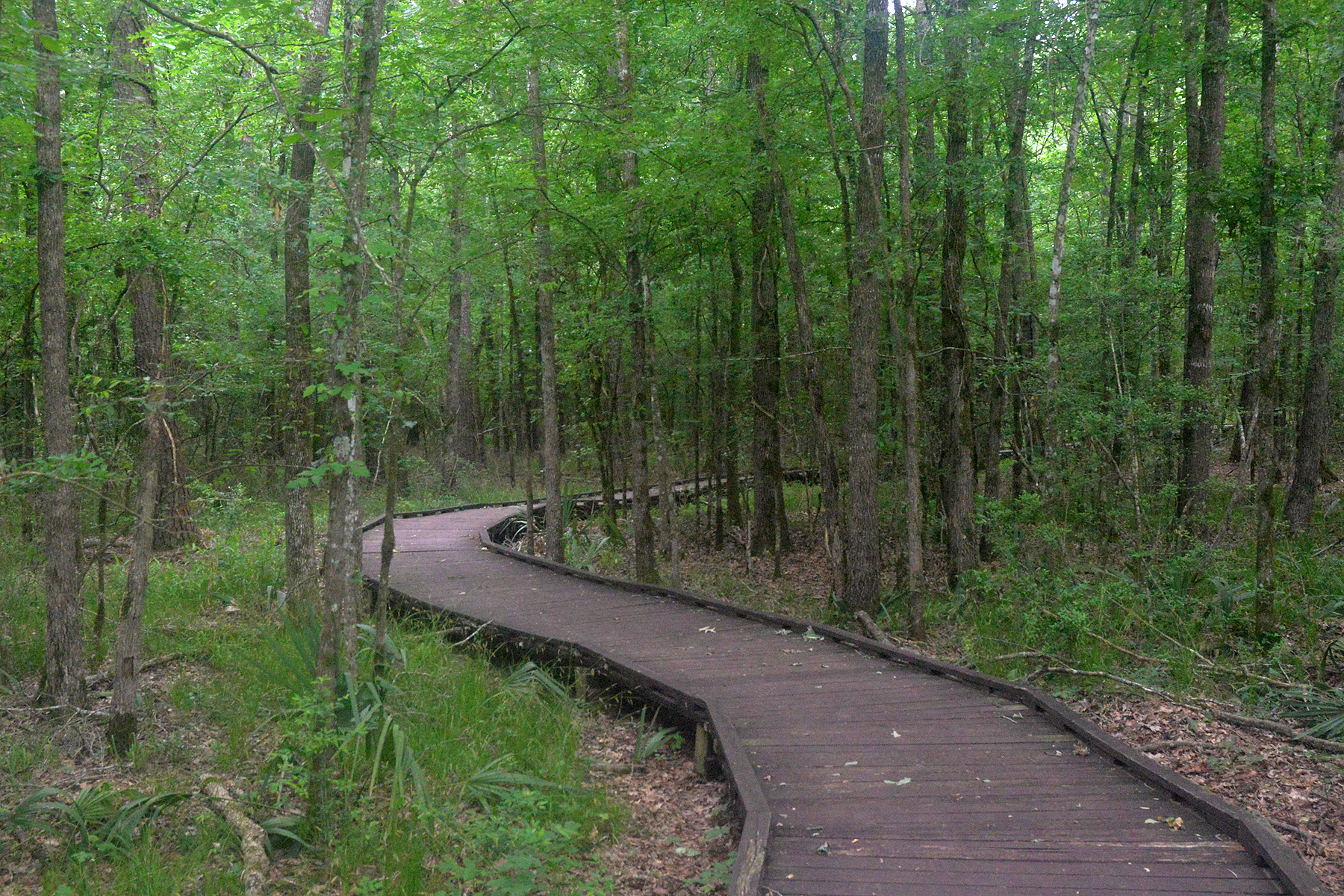
The Pineywoods Boardwalk Trail runs 0.9 miles (1.45 km.) through the forest in the park.

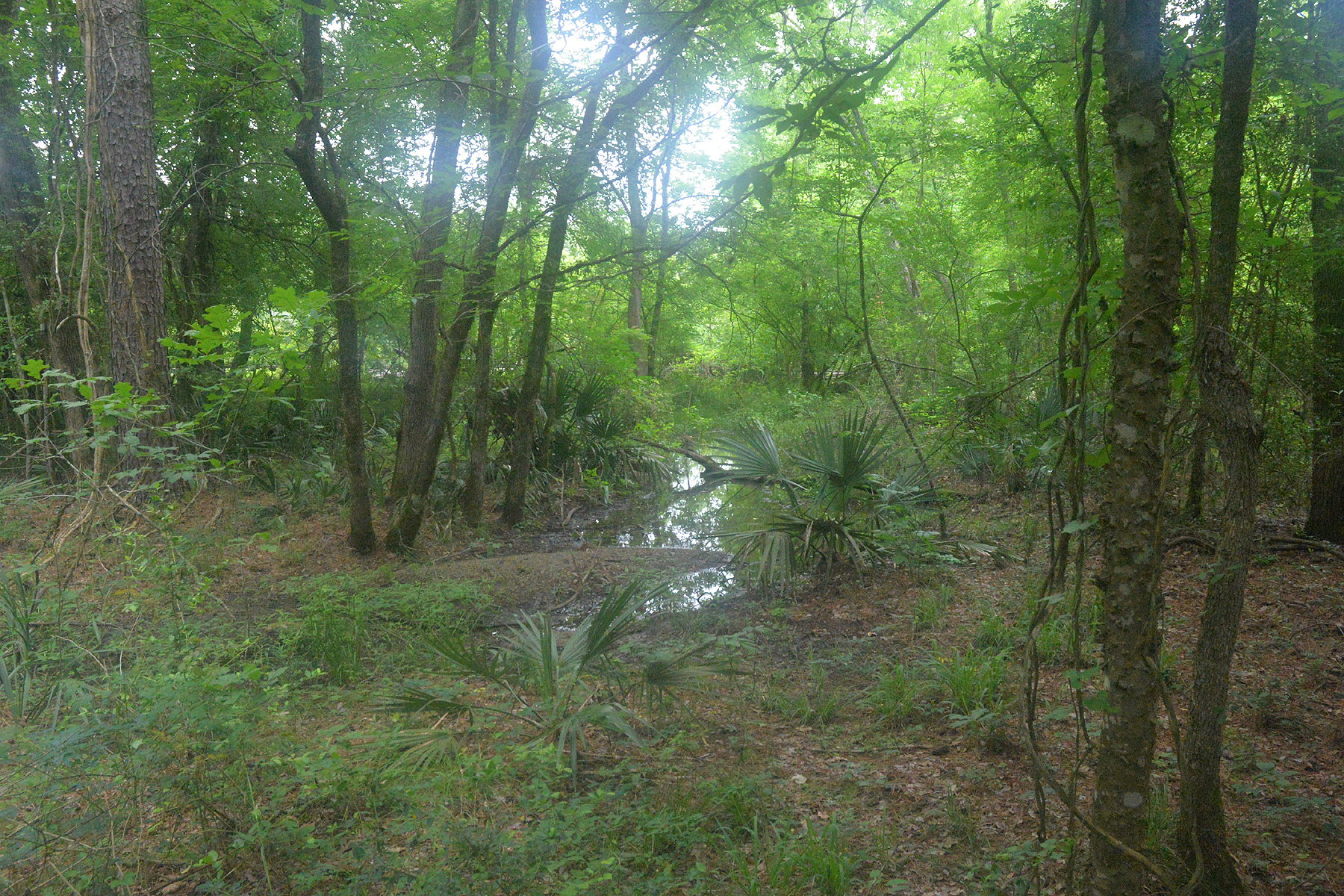
Piney Woods habitat with wetlands in Lake Livingston State Park.
