= Laci Kaye Booth =

American singer-songwriter

- Born: August 28, 1995 (age 31); Livingston, Texas, United States
- Genres: Country; Soft rock
- Occupations: Singer; songwriter
- Instruments: Vocals; guitar
- Years active: 2016–present
- Labels: Big Machine; Geffen; Lost Highway
- Website: shop.lacikayebooth.com

Laci Kaye Booth (born August 28, 1995) is an American country music singer-songwriter from Livingston, Texas, who gained national prominence when she appeared as a contestant on the seventeenth season of American Idol, where she finished in the top five. Following her success on the show, she signed with Big Machine Records to release a self-titled debut mini-album in 2021. After leaving the label, Booth subsequently released her debut full-length studio album The Loneliest Girl in the World in 2024 with Geffen Records, and her second album Love Ain't for the Faint of Heart in 2026 with Lost Highway Records.

== Early life ==
Booth was born and raised in a trailer park in Livingston, Texas. Her father was a musician and she credits him for introducing her to artists like Willie Nelson, Merle Haggard, and Waylon Jennings at an early age, while her mother would play female acts like Shania Twain, The Chicks, and Lee Ann Womack, which helped inspire her to want to become a singer herself. When she was around eight years old, she began performing in church with her mother, and learned to play guitar shortly after, eventually developing and expanding her own musical tastes to include artists like Stevie Nicks, and Norah Jones, who helped her to understand her own raspy vocal style. Despite her desire to pursue music, Booth's mother and stepfather convinced her to go to college after graduating high school, though she would play concerts during the weekends to earn money.

== Career ==
=== American Idol ===
In 2017, Booth self-released an seven track project, Something New. In 2019, she decided to audition for the seventeenth season of American Idol, where she impressed the judges with a cover of Haggard's "Mama Tried". She ultimately made it to the top 5, where she was eliminated alongside fellow contestant Wade Cota.

==== Performance results ====
| Episode | Theme | Song choice | Original artist | Result |
|---|---|---|---|---|
| Audition | Auditioner's Choice | "Mama Tried" | Merle Haggard | Advanced |
| Hollywood Round, Part 1 | Contestant's Choice | "(You Make Me Feel Like) A Natural Woman" | Aretha Franklin | Advanced |
| Hollywood Round, Part 2 | Group Performance | "Grenade" (with Laine Hardy, Katie Belle & Colby Swift) | Bruno Mars | Advanced |
| Hollywood Round, Part 3 | Contestant's Choice | "Stars" | Grace Potter and the Nocturnals | Advanced |
| Showcase Round/Top 40 | Contestant's Choice | "Georgia on My Mind" | Ray Charles | Advanced |
| Top 20 Solo/Duet | Contestant's Choice | Solo "I Want You to Want Me" | Cheap Trick | Advanced |
| Top 20 Solo/Duet | Contestant's Choice | Duet "Mercy" (with Brett Young) | Brett Young | Advanced |
| Top 14 | Contestant's Choice | "I Miss You" | Blink-182 | Safe |
| Top 14 | Victory Song | "As Long as You Follow" | Fleetwood Mac | Safe |
| Top 10 | Disney Night | "I See the Light" (from Tangled) | Mandy Moore and Zachary Levi | Safe |
| Top 8 | Queen Night | "Love of My Life" | Queen | Safe |
| Top 8 | Movie Duets | "Jackson" (from Walk the Line) (with Laine Hardy) | Johnny Cash and June Carter Cash | Safe |
| Top 6 | Woodstock | "To Love Somebody" | Bee Gees | Saved by the judges |
| Top 6 | Showstoppers | "Open Arms" | Journey | Saved by the judges |
| Top 5 | Bobby Bones' Choice | "The House That Built Me" | Miranda Lambert | Eliminated |
| Top 5 | Elton John | "Saturday Night's Alright for Fighting" | Elton John | Eliminated |
| Top 5 | Mother's Day Tribute | "Dreams" | Fleetwood Mac | Eliminated |

Non-competition performances:
| Collaborator(s) | Song | Original artist |
|---|---|---|
| Lionel Richie and American Idol Top 10 | "Dancing on the Ceiling" | Lionel Richie |
| Luke Bryan | "Every Breath You Take" | The Police |
| Kool & the Gang & American Idol Top 10 | "Ladies' Night"/"Celebration" | Kool & the Gang |

=== Post-Idol career, Laci Kaye Booth and The Loneliest Girl in the World ===
After American Idol, Booth moved from Texas to Nashville in order to pursue a record deal, and subsequently signed with Big Machine Records in 2019, expressing at the time that her goal was to be played on country radio and have a career comparable to Taylor Swift, the label's flagship artist at the time. Booth released a self-titled eight track mini-album with Big Machine on August 6, 2021, but later described her experience as "one of those nightmare record deals where they just choose everything for you" and expressed that the project "didn’t even feel like me". Booth was frustrated by the lack of creative control and was steered away from her "dreamy country" sound and told which songs to record, later noting that was discussion of incorporating tejano influences into her sound because of her Mexican heritage which she was very against, and that "Treasure", the one Latin-infused song on the album "makes [her] skin crawl". In response to her comments, a Big Machine executive pointed out that Booth co-wrote all eight songs on the project and claimed that they had each been mutually agreed upon by her and the label. She was dropped from the label the following year after the project failed to make a major commercial impression, which Booth feels was due to a number of factors including the COVID-19 pandemic, lack of breakthrough female country artists other than Lainey Wilson, and her own lack of belief in the album, which she believed comes across in the music. Following her experience, Booth briefly considered abandoning music, returning to Texas, and finishing the college degree she'd left to audition for Idol, but instead decided to change manager and booking agent, and continued writing songs, eventually taking one, "True Love", to producer Ben West, who helped to cultivate her Skeeter Davis/Fleetwood Mac/Lana Del Rey influenced sound and reinvigorated her creatively. When she released "Damn Good in a Dive Bar", an executive from Geffen Records saw a clip of her performing it live on TikTok and reached out to sign her.

On May 17, 2024, Booth released her debut full-length album The Loneliest Girl in the World with Geffen. Produced by West, the project featured fifteen tracks and Booth said of its creation: "this album has been two years in the making, but has taken a whole life of heartache, loneliness, failure, and big dreaming to create. I’m so happy to finally share what is truly a piece of my heart with the world."

=== Love Ain't for the Faint of Heart ===
In 2026, Booth was selected to open selected dates on Ella Langley's Dandelion Tour. On June 4, 2026, she announced her second studio album Love Ain't for the Faint of Heart alongside the release of the single "Ethereal Redneck Shit". The album was released on September 18, 2026, via Lost Highway Records. Of the project, with she re-teamed with West for, Booth cited Stevie Nicks and Lana Del Rey as major sonic influences and stated, "I thought this was such a representation of who I am to my core" and described it as an album "came about when I was falling in love and I knew from the beginning the record would be about love in all its forms", which she noted was in contrast to her previous album, which explored her feelings of loneliness and isolation.

== Personal life ==
Booth and Australian singer-songwriter Morgan Evans appeared on the red carpet together at the 59th Annual Country Music Association Awards, several months after she had referred to him as her boyfriend during a show in California. In March 2026, Evans confirmed that he and Booth had been in a relationship since 2024 but preferred to keep their personal lives to themselves. Booth duets with Evans on "Two Broken Hearts", a song from Evans' album Steel Town, and the pair co-wrote "Daddy's Mugshot", a track from Booth's album Love Ain't for the Faint of Heart.

== Discography ==
=== Albums ===
| Title | Details |
|---|---|
| The Loneliest Girl in the World | Released: May 17, 2024; Label: Geffen Records; Format: Digital download, streaming |
| Love Ain't for the Faint of Heart | Released: September 18, 2026; Label: Lost Highway Records; Format: Digital download, streaming |

=== Mini-albums ===
| Title | Details |
|---|---|
| Something New | Released: September 11, 2017; Label: Self-released; Format: Digital download, streaming |
| Laci Kaye Booth | Released: August 6, 2021; Label: Big Machine Records; Format: Digital download, streaming |
