= Seven Hours After Violet =

American metalcore band

- Origin: Glendale, California, U.S.
- Genres: Metalcore; alternative metal
- Years active: 2024–present
- Label: Sumerian
- Spinoff of: System of a Down
- Members: Shavo Odadjian; Taylor Barber; Alejandro Aranda; Michael Montoya; Josh Johnson
- Website: www.sevenhoursafterviolet.com

Seven Hours After Violet is an American metalcore band formed by System of a Down bassist Shavo Odadjian in 2024. The band also features Alejandro Aranda, Taylor Barber of Left to Suffer, and Michael Montoya and Josh Johnson of Winds of Plague.

== History ==
In October 2023, Odadjian announced that Seven Hours After Violet was producing 16 songs for the group's first album. In June 2024, the band released their debut single "Paradise." This was followed by the release of their self-titled album on October 11, 2024.

== Members ==
- Shavo Odadjian – bass
- Taylor Barber – vocals
- Alejandro Aranda – guitars, backing vocals
- Michael "Morgoth" Montoya – guitars, backing vocals
- Josh Johnson – drums

== Discography ==
=== Seven Hours After Violet ===
Seven Hours After Violet

Studio album by Seven Hours After Violet
- Released: October 11, 2024
- Label: Sumerian Records

Singles from Seven Hours After Violet
- 1. "Paradise" Released: June 12, 2024; 2. "Radiance" Released: August 21, 2024; 3. "Alive" Released: September 19, 2024

Seven Hours After Violet is Seven Hours After Violet's debut studio album.

=== Track listing ===
No.	Title	Length
1.	"Paradise"	3:01
2.	"Alive"	3:10
3.	"Sunrise"	3:37
4.	"Go!"	2:39
5.	"Float"	3:54
6.	"Glink"	2:27
7.	"Cry..."	3:38
8.	"Abandon"	2:38
9.	"Radiance"	3:35
10.	"Gloom"	3:25
11.	"Feel"	3:06

=== Singles ===
List of singles, with selected chart positions and certifications, showing year released and album name
Title	Year	Peak chart positions	Album
Title	Year	US Main.	Album
"Radiance"	2024	22	Seven Hours After Violet

=== Music Videos ===
List of music videos, showing year released and director(s) name
Year	Title	Director(s)
2024	"Paradise"	Unknown
2024	"Radiance"	Max Moore
2024	"Alive"	Bond Creative
2024	"Cry..."	Bond Creative
2025	"Float"	Glen Matheny
