= Livingston, Texas =

Town and countt seat in Texas, US

- Town
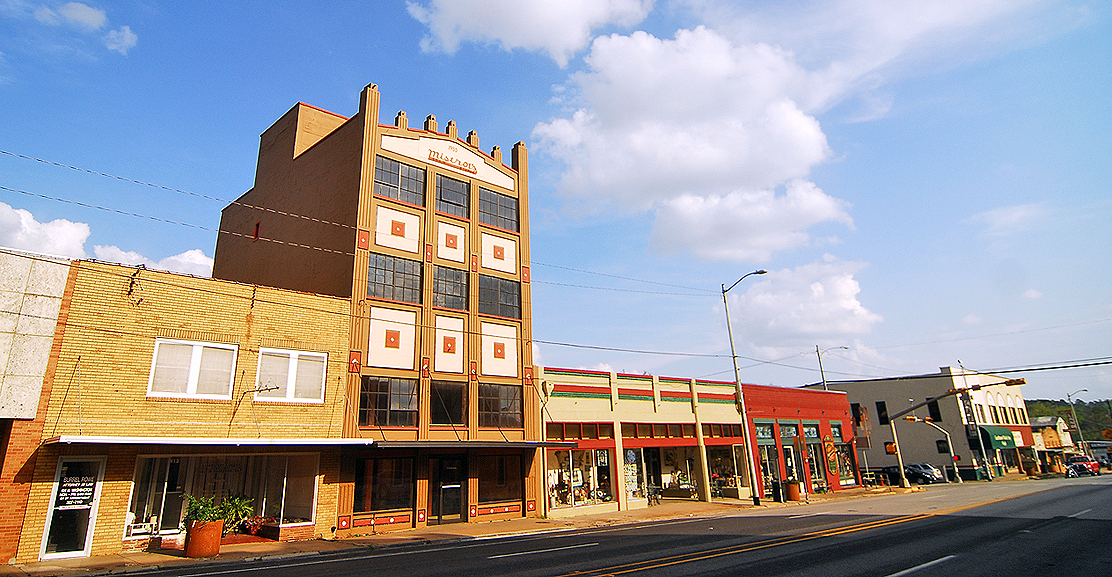
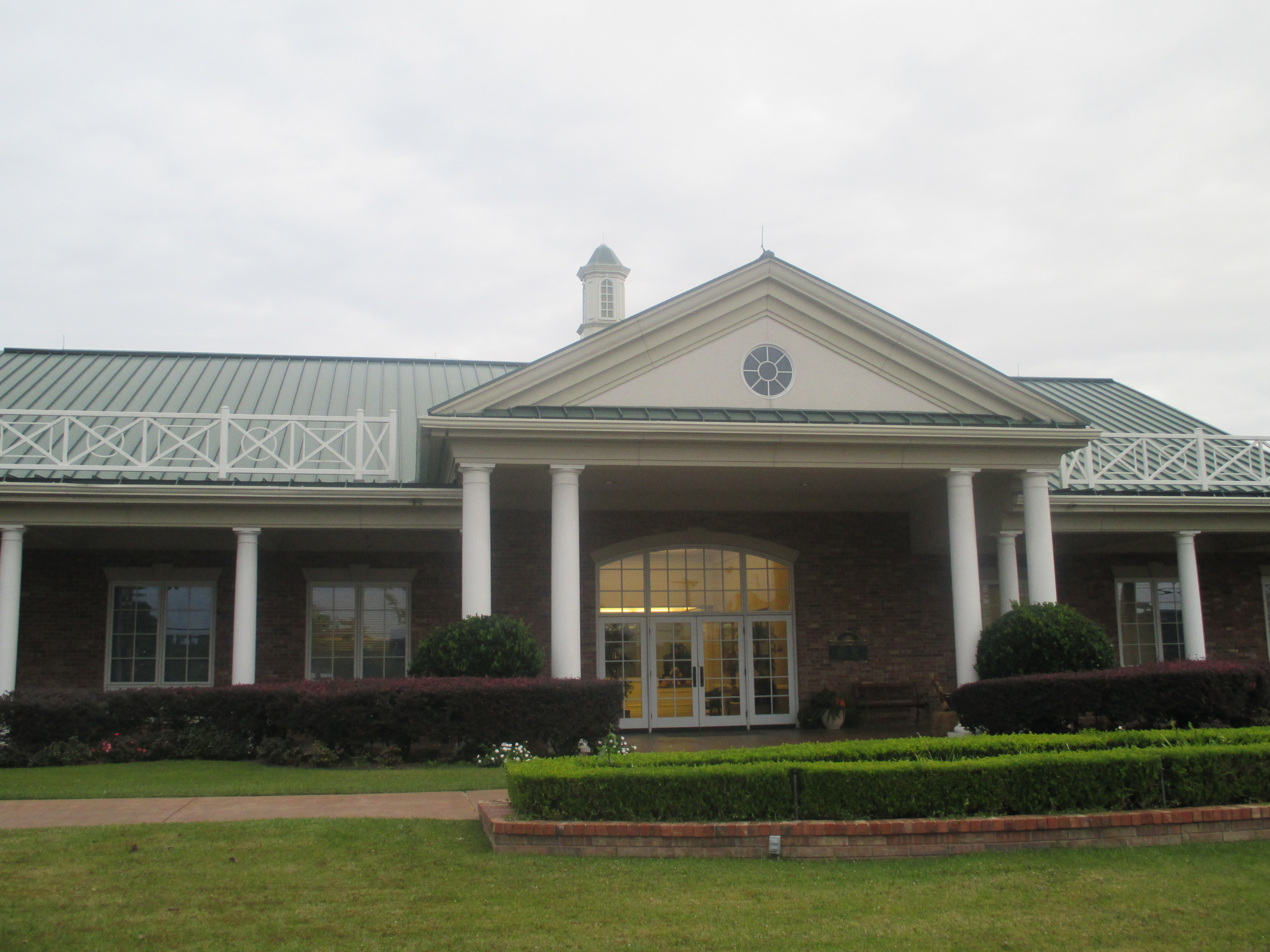
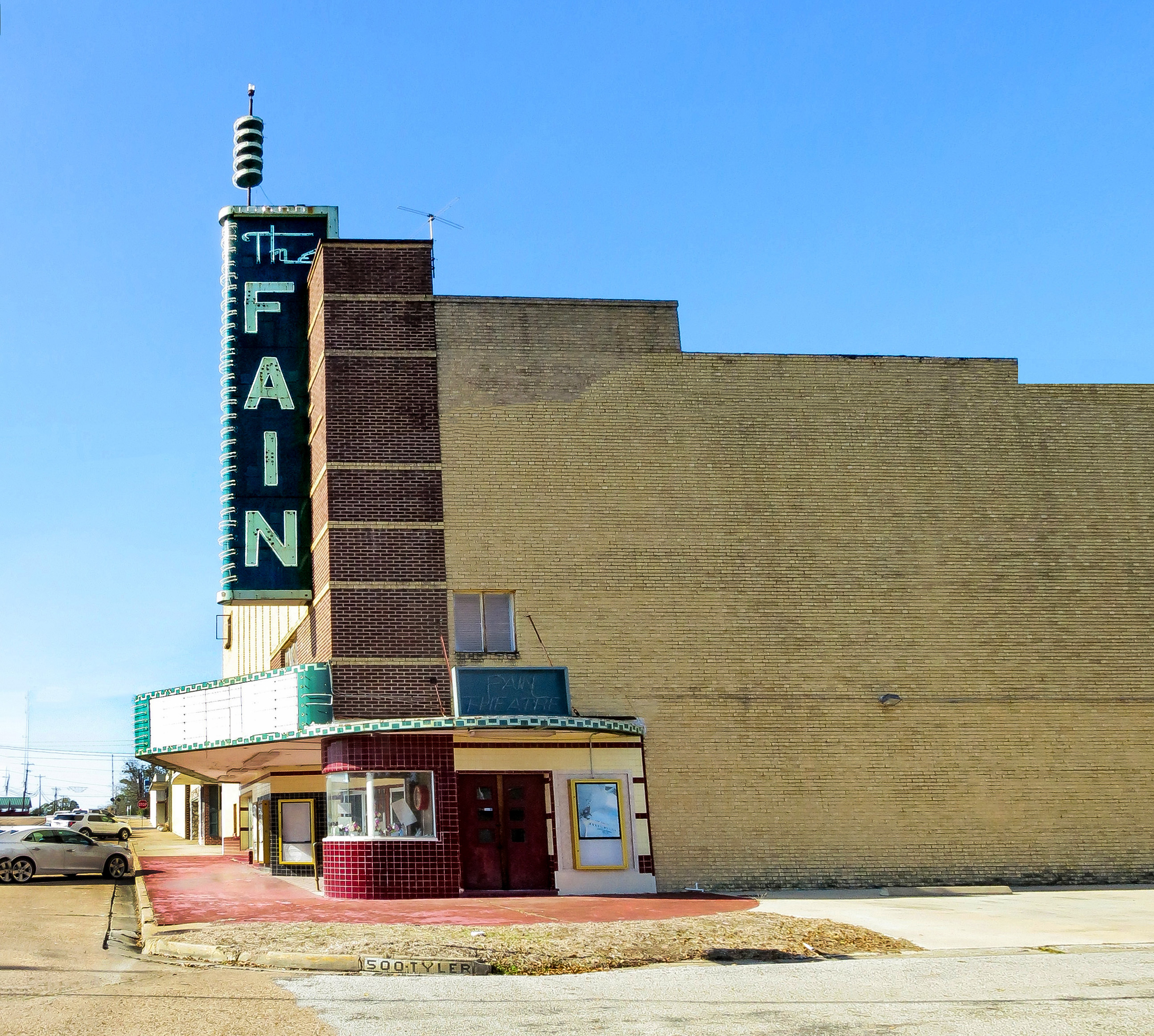
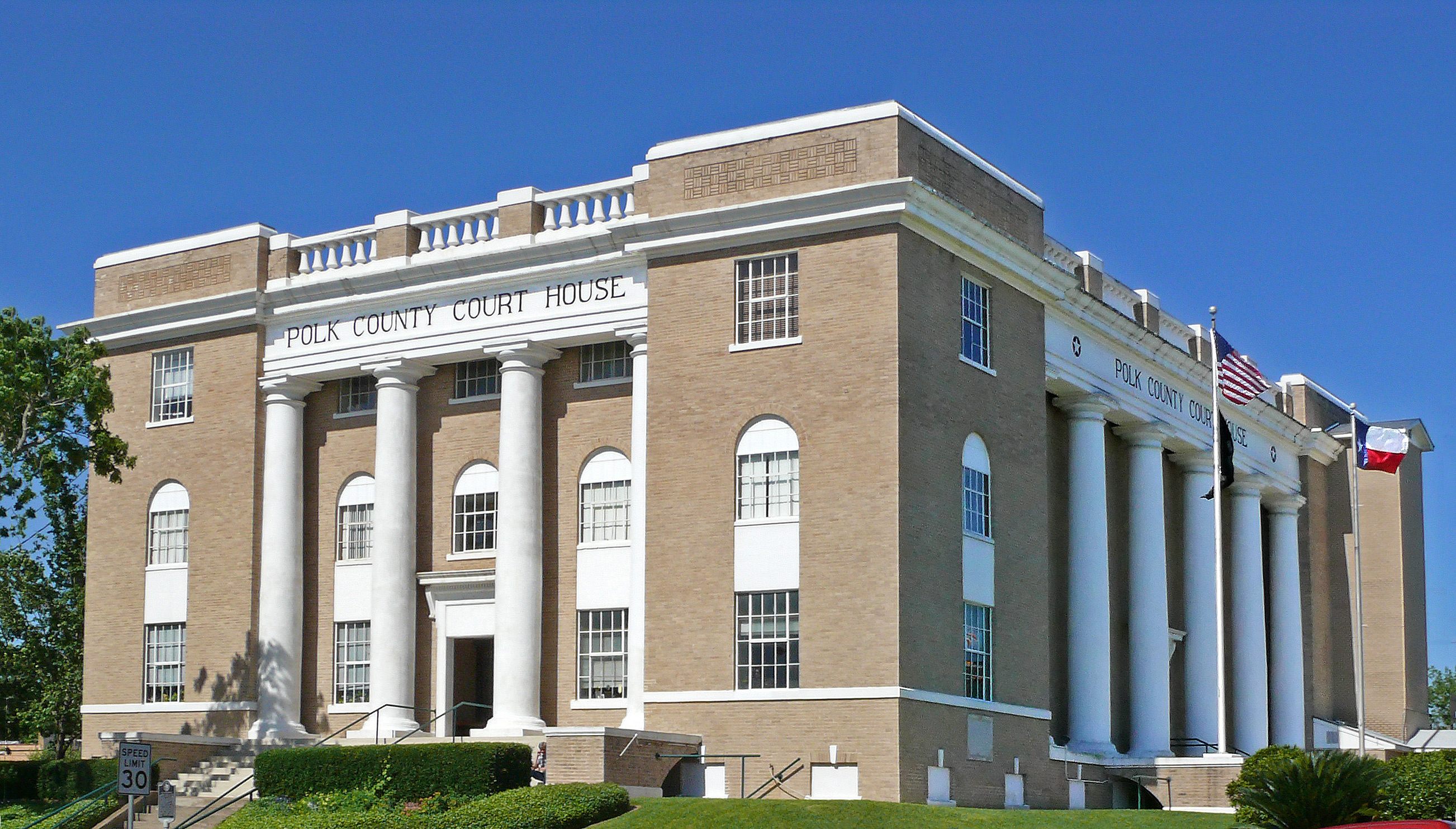
- Clockwise from top: Downtown Livingston; The Fain Theater; Polk County Courthouse; and the Livingston City Hall

- Location of Livingston, Texas
- Coordinates: 30°42′34″N 94°55′59″W
- Country: United States
- State: Texas
- County: Polk
- Established: October 3, 1902

Government
  - Type: Council-manager
  - Mayor: Judy B. Cochran

Area
  - Total: 8.74 sq mi (22.64 km^{2})
  - Land: 8.73 sq mi (22.61 km^{2})
  - Water: 0.012 sq mi (0.03 km^{2})
- Elevation: 184 ft (56 m)

Population (2020)
  - Total: 5,640
  - Density: 600.5/sq mi (231.85/km^{2})
- Time zone: UTC-6 (Central (CST))
  - Summer (DST): UTC-5 (CDT)
- ZIP codes: 77351, 77352, 77399
- Area code: 936
- FIPS code: 48-43132
- GNIS feature ID: 2412903
- Website: Livingston City website

Livingston is a town in and the county seat of Polk County, Texas, United States. With a population of 5,640 at the 2020 census, it is the largest city in Polk County. It is located about 46 miles (74 km) south of Lufkin and roughly 74 miles (119 km) northeast of Houston. The city was originally settled in 1835 as Springfield. Its name was changed in 1846 to Livingston, when it was designated as the county seat of Polk County.

The Alabama-Coushatta Indian Reservation is located to the east of Livingston. The tribe traditionally occupied territory in what is now East Texas and Louisiana. The 2000 census reported a resident population of 480 persons within the reservation. The tribe has nearly 1200 enrolled members.

== Geography ==
According to the United States Census Bureau, the town has a total area of 8.4 square miles (22 km^{2}), of which 8.4 sq mi (22 km^{2}) are land and 0.12% is covered by water. However, the town of Livingston is about 10 mi (16 km) east of Lake Livingston, which is the largest drinking-water reservoir in Texas.

The zip code for the general area of Livingston is 77351.

== Demographics ==
Historical population
Census	Pop.	Note	%±
1880	135		—
1920	928		—
1930	1,165		25.5%
1940	1,851		58.9%
1950	2,865		54.8%
1960	3,398		18.6%
1970	3,965		16.7%
1980	4,928		24.3%
1990	5,019		1.8%
2000	5,433		8.2%
2010	5,335		−1.8%
2020	5,640		5.7%
U.S. Decennial Census

Livingston racial composition as of 2020 (NH = Non-Hispanic) (Note: Note: the US Census treats Hispanic/Latino as an ethnic category. This table excludes Latinos from the racial categories and assigns them to a separate category. Hispanics/Latinos can be of any race.)
Race	Number	Percentage
White (NH)	3,103	55.02%
Black or African American (NH)	997	17.68%
Native American or Alaska Native (NH)	28	0.5%
Asian (NH)	96	1.7%
Some other race (NH)	20	0.35%
Multiracial (NH)	199	3.53%
Hispanic or Latino	1,197	21.22%
Total	5,640	

As of the 2020 United States census, 5,640 people, 1,951 households, and 1,268 families were residing in the town.

The population in the 2010 census was 5,335. As of the census of 2000, the population density was 649.9 inhabitants per square mile (250.9/km^{2}). The 2,358 housing units averaged 282.1 per square mile (108.9/km^{2}). The racial makeup of the town was 70.38% White, 18.50% African American, 0.64% Native American, 0.83% Asian, 8.08% from other races, and 1.56% from two or more races. About 13.90% of the population were Hispanic or Latino of any race.

Of the 2,048 households, 34.4% had children under 18 living with them, 45.4% were married couples living together, 16.4% had a female householder with no husband present, and 34.5% were not families. About 30.9% of all households were made up of individuals, and 15.7% had someone living alone who was 65 or older. The average household size was 2.50 and the average family size was 3.13.

In the town, the population was distributed as 27.7% under 18, 9.1% from 18 to 24, 26.5% from 25 to 44, 19.7% from 45 to 64, and 17.1% who were 65 or older. The median age was 35 years. For every 100 females, there were 85.0 males. For every 100 females 18 and over, there were 79.2 males.

The median income in the town for a household was $31,424 and for a family was $37,868. Males had a median income of $30,318 versus $21,774 for females. The per capita income for the town was $17,214. About 18.2% of families and 22.3% of the population were below the poverty line, including 27.7% of those under 18 and 17.4% of those 65 or over.

== Government and infrastructure ==
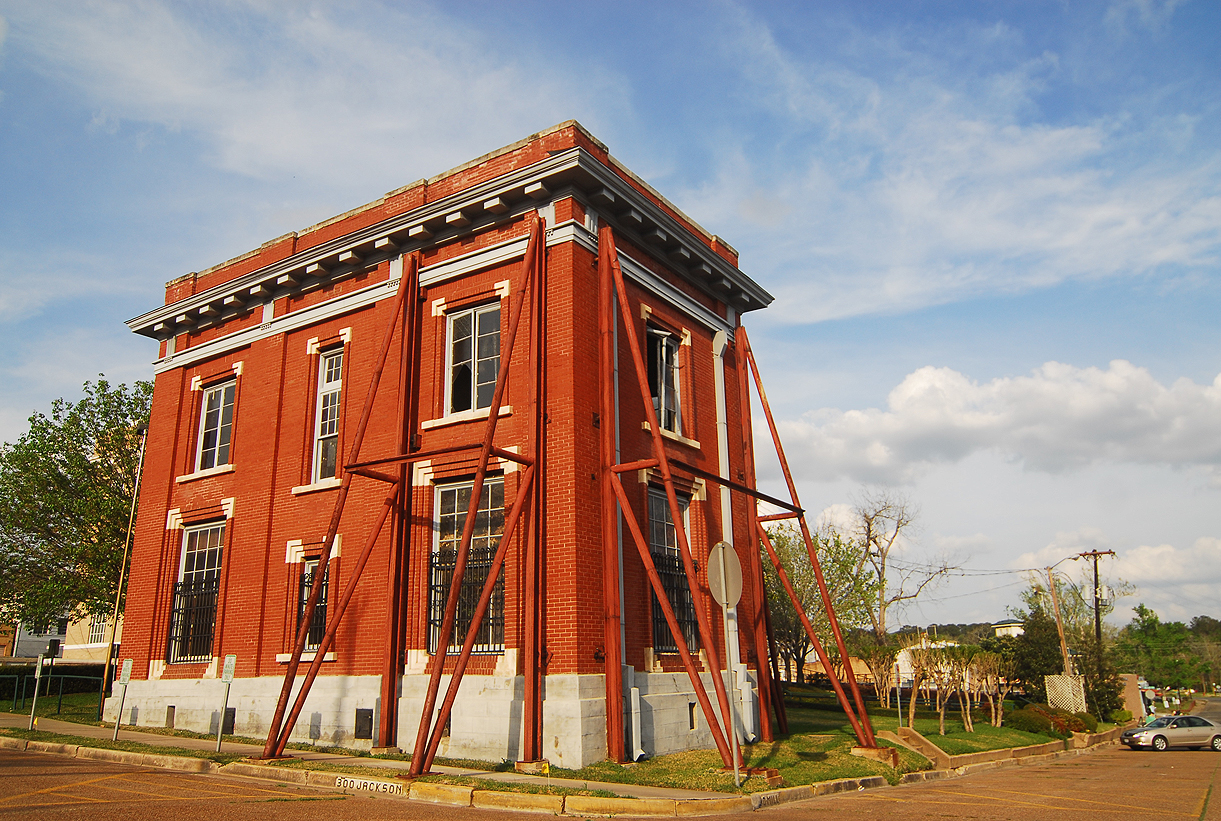
Historic downtown Livingston

The United States Postal Service operates the Livingston Post Office.

The Livingston Municipal Airport (LMA), operated by the City of Livingston, is located to the southwest of the city (West Livingston). It is classified as a general-aviation facility serving private aircraft.

Nearby West Livingston has the Texas Department of Criminal Justice Allan B. Polunsky Unit. Since 1999, this prison has been the location of Texas's death row.

A few miles outside of Livingston is the IAH Polk County Secure Adult Detention Center, which houses around 700 immigrant men daily who have been detained by federal agents of Immigration and Customs Enforcement. Run by the private-prison company Community Education Centers, the facility has frequently been criticized for its subpar treatment of migrants. It is ranked as one of the 10 worst detention centers in the nation, which are the subject of a nationwide campaign by activists to close them.

=== Local government ===
Livingston has a manager-council system of government. It elects a mayor at-large, and has a city council made up of members elected from single-member districts. The city council hires a professional city manager to handle operations. The current mayor is Judy Cochran.

== Economy ==
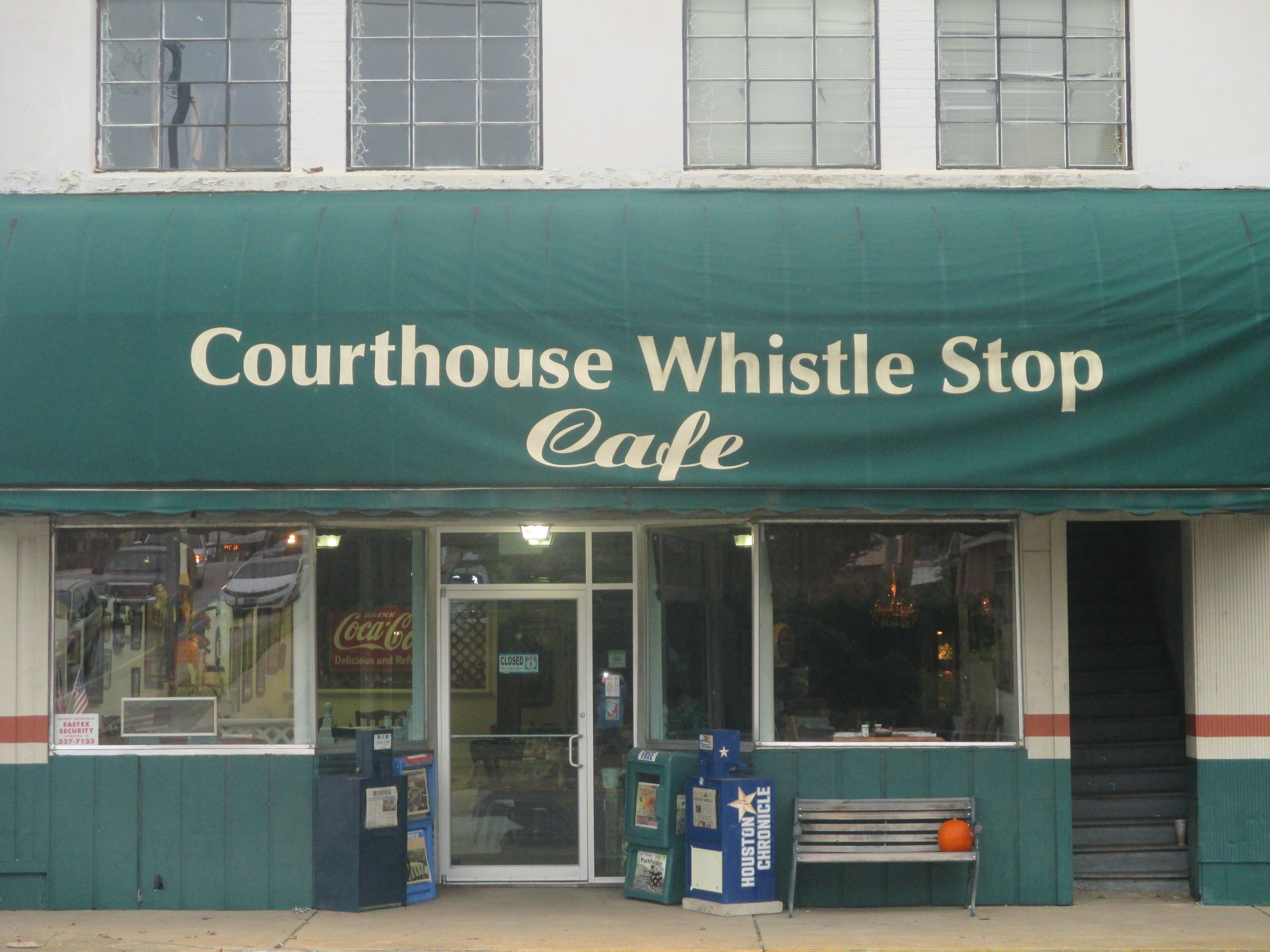
The Courthouse Whistle Stop Cafe is located across from the courthouse in downtown Livingston.

The major employers in Livingston are lumber operations and the Polunsky Unit state prison in West Livingston.

Livingston is the headquarters to two regional bank systems, the First National Bank and the First State Bank. First State Bank has its main office in downtown Livingston and branches in Livingston (west side of town on Highway 190), Onalaska, and Shepherd. First National Bank has its main office on Highway 190 and branches in downtown Livingston and Onalaska.

== Transportation ==
Major highways:

- U.S. Highway 59
  - U.S. 59 is scheduled to be upgraded to Interstate 69.
- U.S. Route 190
- State Highway 146

== Education ==
The City of Livingston is served by the Livingston Independent School District.

The Texas Legislature designated Polk County as within the boundary of Angelina College's district. Polk County Community College opened in the fall of 2014. The college offers various classes and two-year associate's degrees.

== Recreation ==
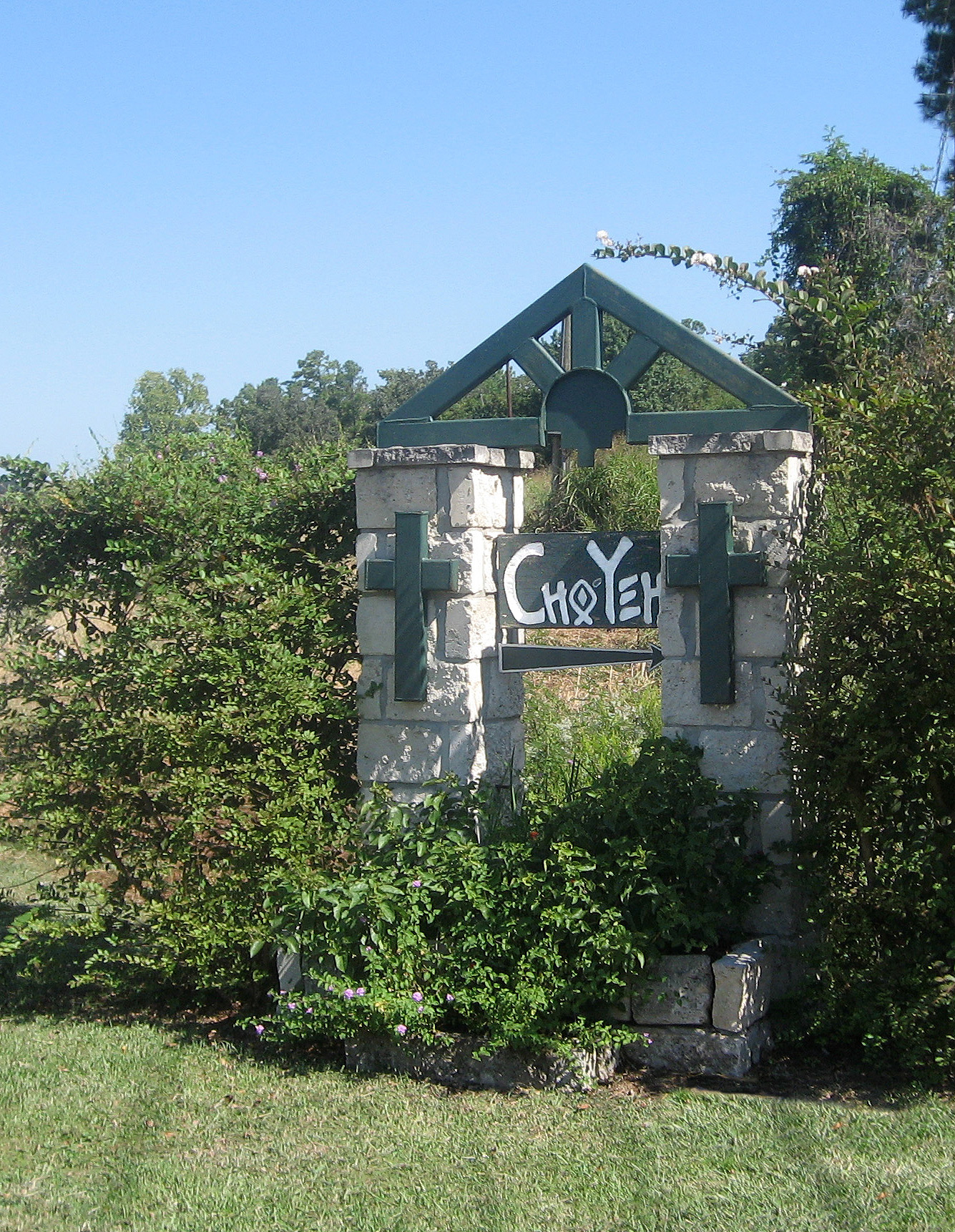
Camp Cho Yeh -- Livingston, Texas

Lake Evelyn is within the borders of Camp Cho-Yeh, which began operation in the 1940s; it continues to operate as a summer camp and retreat center. Cho-Yeh means "land of tall pines", and was so named because of the large pine trees on the property. Cho-Yeh is also used by Texas A&M Galveston for its yearly Fish Camp to introduce TAMUG students to the traditions of the university system.

== Notable people ==
- Laci Kaye Booth, American Idol contestant 2019, top-five finalist
- Paul Carr, NFL and University of Houston football player
- Billy Eli, musician and songwriter
- Percy Foreman, criminal defense attorney
- Annette Gordon-Reed, Harvard historian and law professor
- Lyda Green, Alaska state senator for 14 years
- Margo Jones, stage director
- Sally Mayes, Award-winning Broadway actress and singer
- Mark Moseley, football player
- Gene Phillips, Professional basketball player
- Samuel M. Whitside, commanded Camp Livingston in the late 1860s during the Reconstruction period
- Brad Womack, star of ABC's The Bachelor
- Bobby Wayne Woods, convicted child rapist and murderer; the last inmate executed in Texas in the 2000s decade

== Media ==
- KCTL Television
- KETX Television
- STRYK TV – Video Country Locally owned and operated by Mouser Media
- KETX Radio (1440 KETX (AM)
- KEHH
- PolkCountyToday.com (news website)
- Polk County Enterprise (newspaper), East Texas News (online version of the Polk County Enterprise)

== Tourism and recreation ==
=== Destinations ===
- Lake Livingston
- Lake Livingston State Park Lake Livingston State Park — Texas Parks & Wildlife Department
- Pedigo Park
- Alabama-Coushatta Indian Reservation

=== Attractions ===
- Light of Saratoga at Bragg Road
- 391 Historical Markers
- Polk County MuseumPOLK COUNTY MUSEUM – Polk County Historical Society
- Swartout: Former river ferry town, now a ghost town

=== Events ===
- Trinity Neches Livestock Show and Rodeo (founded in 1945)
- Polk County Fireworks on Lake Livingston
- Annual Jingle Bell Fun Run and Walk
- Hometown Christmas
- 5K Dam Run

== Entertainment references ==
Lake Livingston was featured on the third episode of the first season of the television show, River Monsters, which aired April 19, 2009, on Animal Planet. The host, Jeremy Wade, was searching for alligator gar.
