= Alejandro Aranda =

American musician (born 1994)

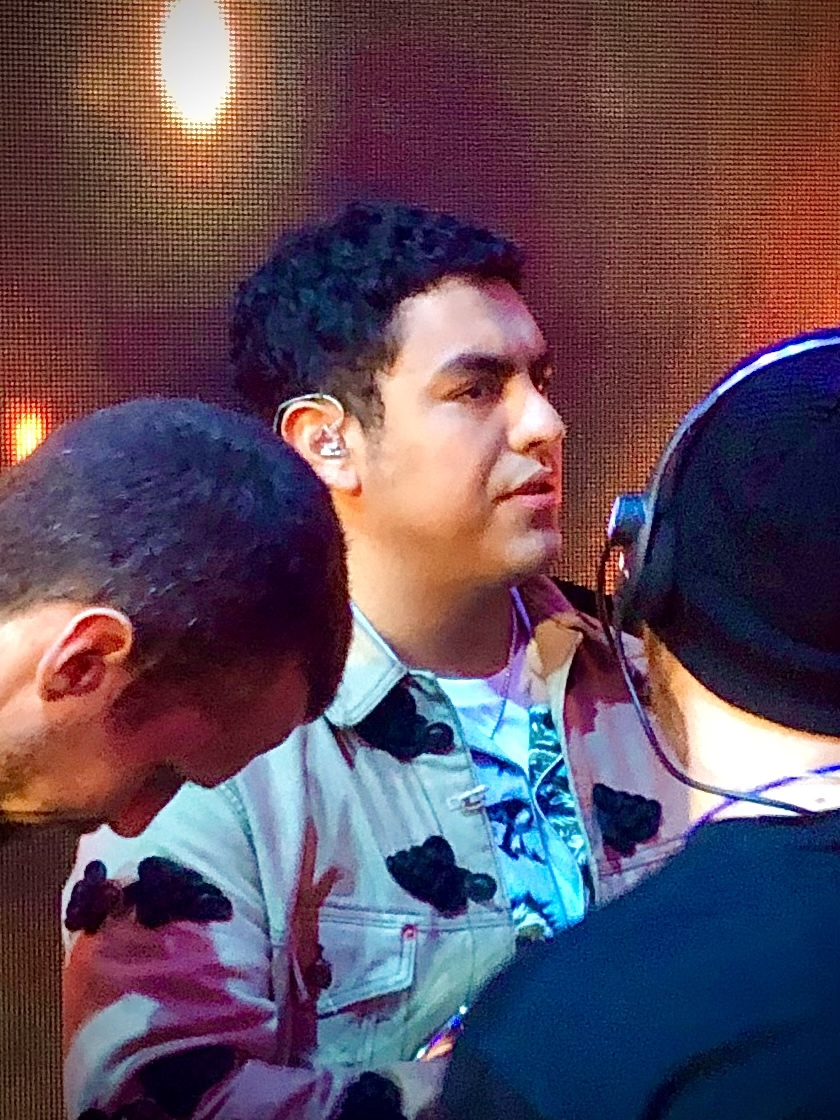
- Aranda prepares to perform at the American Idol season 1) finale in May 2019.

Background information
- Also known as: Scarypoolparty
- Born: August 11, 1994 (age 32); Pomona, California, U.S.
- Genres: R&B
- Instruments: Vocals; guitar; piano
- Years active: 2017–present
- Labels: Hollywood; 19
- Member of: Seven Hours After Violet

Alejandro Aranda (born August 11, 1994), also known by his stage name Scarypoolparty, is an American musician and reality television personality from Pomona, California. He was the runner-up on the seventeenth season of American Idol. Aranda's debut album, Exit Form, was released on November 22, 2019. His second album, Doom Hologram, was released on September 4, 2020. His first EP, L.A., was released in 2021. Aranda's third album, The Act of Forgiveness, was released in 2021.

Aranda is currently a guitarist and vocalist in the metalcore band Seven Hours After Violet.

== Early life ==
Aranda was born on August 11, 1994, in Pomona, California.

Aranda has said that his musical influences include classical composers Ludwig van Beethoven, Johann Sebastian Bach and Frédéric Chopin, along with contemporary artists such as Dead Can Dance, Nine Inch Nails, Trent Reznor, and Slipknot.

In 2017, Aranda won Artist of the Year with CSUN and Five of Five Entertainment. It was from here that he started gaining traction in the music industry.

His American Idol audition was aired March 6, 2019. Aranda is the only contestant to play seven original songs in the show's history, even though producers encouraged him to play cover versions of other musicians' music.

== American Idol ==
He received a private audition through someone who attended a backyard concert that he performed, and on March 6, 2019, he auditioned for the seventeenth season of American Idol in Los Angeles. Aranda performed two original songs, "Out Loud" and "Cholo Love." Luke Bryan said, "I just feel like I'm in the presence of greatness." and "It was like watching my favorite movie that I did not want to end." Katy Perry said, "Okay Alejandro, I think you're the winner. I think you're really special. I think you're an absolute genius."

His audition video was released on February 6, 2019, and as of August 2019, it had reached 14 million YouTube views. On March 16, 2019, Stevie Nicks wrote on Instagram a prophecy saying he will "perform across great stages of the world" and "...let me welcome you to the grand stage that will be your home for the rest of your extraordinary life."

Aranda performed seven different original songs. He played "10 Years" in Hollywood Week and in the finale with an orchestra, making him the only contestant to perform four original songs in the finale of the show.

Episode	Theme	Song Choice	Original Artist	Order #	Result
Audition	Auditioner's Choice	"Out Loud"	Himself	N/A	Advanced
Audition	Auditioner's Choice	"Cholo Love"	Himself	N/A	Advanced
Hollywood Round, Round 1	Contestant's Choice	"Sorry"	Justin Bieber	N/A	Advanced
Hollywood Round, Round 2	Group Performance	"Go Your Own Way" (with Eddie Island, Shawn Robinson, Drew Chambers, & Aronn Mendoza)	Fleetwood Mac	N/A	Advanced
Hollywood Round, Round 3	Contestant's Choice	"10 Years"	Himself	N/A	Advanced
Showcase Round / Top 40	Contestant's Choice	"Yellow"	Coldplay	21	Advanced
Top 20 Solo & Duet	Contestant's Choice	"I Fall Apart"	Post Malone	16	Advanced
Top 20 Solo & Duet	Contestant's Choice	"There Will Be a Light" (with Ben Harper)	Ben Harper and The Blind Boys of Alabama	18	Advanced
Top 14	Contestant's Choice	"One Dance"	Drake	11	Safe
Top 14	Victory Song	"Cholo Love"	Himself	13	Safe
Top 10	Disney Night	"Remember Me"	from Coco	3	Safe
Top 8	Queen Night	"Under Pressure"	Queen	5	Safe
Top 8	Movie Duets	"Mrs. Robinson" (with Walker Burroughs)	Simon & Garfunkel	10	Safe
Top 6	Woodstock	"White Rabbit"	Jefferson Airplane	5	Safe
Top 6	Showstoppers	"Poison"	Himself	8	Safe
Top 5	Bobby Bones' Choice	"No Woman, No Cry"	Bob Marley and the Wailers	3	Safe
Top 5	Elton John Night	"Sorry Seems to Be the Hardest Word"	Elton John	8	Safe
Top 5	Hero Dedication	"Blesser"	Himself	14	Safe
Finale	Contestant's Choice	"Millennial Love"	Himself	3	Runner–up
Finale	Contestant's Choice	"Tonight"	Himself	6	Runner–up
Finale	Contestant's Choice	"Out Loud"	Himself	8	Runner–up

== Post-American Idol ==
=== 2019 to present ===
During the Hometown Heroes Concert in Pomona, California, the mayor of Pomona declared May 19, 2019 "Alejandro Aranda Day." Following American Idol, Aranda went on a seven-date United States tour in July 2019. Tickets went on sale on the morning of May 23, every show sold out in under 15 minutes. American Idol judge Katy Perry jokingly begged Aranda to be a "roadie" on her tour.

Aranda performed a free concert in Nashville, Tennessee on July 3, joined by Bizz & Everyday People. He met Darren King at the Nashville show and being a long-time fan of MuteMath, it was an opportunity to play on the road with King and his wife, Sucre, during the 2019 Fall Tour.

He released the single, "Tonight," under the name Scarypoolparty on June 28, 2019, after signing with Hollywood Records. The song was co-written and co-produced by Twin Shadow. "Tonight" was performed on American Idol during the auditions as well as April 15, 2019 during the top 14 results show. On August 7, 2019, he released the song, "Cholo Love". The song was played during the audition and during the Wildcard Episode on April 15, 2019. He wrote and produced this song for Exit Form with his friend and mentor Twin Shadow.

Aranda went on a 29 stop fall tour from October 10 to November 22, and performed at several music festivals, including Lollapalooza in Chicago on August 3, 2019, Life Is Beautiful Music & Art Festival in September 2019 and Austin City Limits Music Festival in October 2019.

Aranda released the single, "Diamonds," on October 4, 2019, along with a YouTube video and behind the scenes video. It was the stage for upcoming albums and a separation from the Idol image that was created and often in conflict with his emerging Scarypoolparty alter ego. Exit Form, his debut album, was released on November 22, 2019. He was featured on Lollapalooza's 2020 online festival, which showed previously recorded concert sets.

On March 2, 2021, he released a collaborative single with Nothing,Nowhere under the stage name Scarypoolparty. The song was a precursor to the EP, Los Angeles, which was released on March 26.

On August 27, 2021, Aranda released a 21-song album, The Act of Forgiveness. He collaborated with composer Rob Mathes on an 18-piece orchestra, adding orchestral arrangements on 12 of the album's tracks. The Beautiful Liar Tour with X Ambassadors and Taylor Janzen began on October 15, 2021. He performed six to seven songs at each show on the United States leg. Janzen opened the shows, Scarypoolparty followed, and X Ambassadors were the main act.

In April 2024, Aranda joined the band Seven Hours After Violet. He was also featured on the single "Forever" by Left to Suffer.

== Personal life ==
In an interview with Launch Left, Aranda talked about his family and the fact that he was not close to them. He is extremely private and there are not many details available about his private life.

== Discography ==
=== Studio albums ===
List of studio albums, with selected details
Title	Details	Peak chart positions
Title	Details	US Heat
Exit Form	Released: November 22, 2019; Label: Hollywood Records; Format: Digital download	6
Doom Hologram	Released: September 4, 2020; Label: Hollywood Records; Format: Digital download, vinyl	
The Act of Forgiveness	Released: August 27, 2021	
Unplugged	Released: September 27, 2024; Format: Digital download	

=== Extended plays ===
List of EP's, with selected details
Title	Details
Los Angeles	Released: March 26, 2021

=== Singles ===
Title	Year	Album
"Fading Away"	2018	Non-album single
"Out Loud"	2018	Exit Form
"10 Years"	2018	Exit Form
"Tonight"	2019	Exit Form
"Cholo Love"	2019	Exit Form
"Diamonds"	2019	Exit Form
"Return2Sender"	2020	Doom Hologram
"Home"	2021	Non-album single
"Cellphones"	2021	The Act of Forgiveness
"Universe"	2021	Los Angeles
"The Darkness"	2021	The Act of Forgiveness
"Friends"	2021	The Act of Forgiveness
"Poison"	2021	The Act of Forgiveness
