= Billy Eli =

American singer (born 1962)

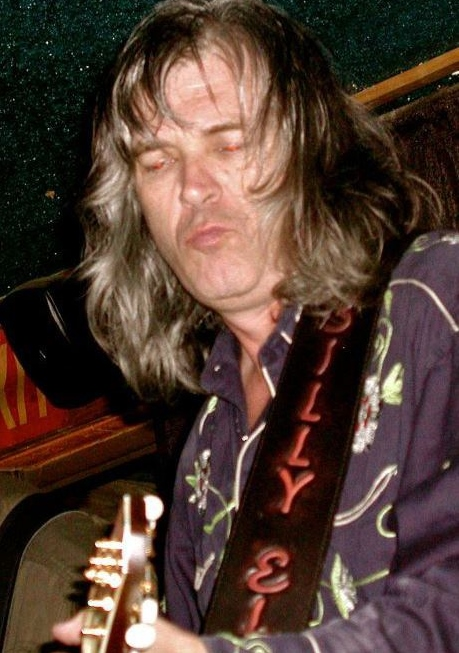
Eli performing in 2012

Billy Eli (born Billy V. Lambeth; 1962) is an Austin, Texas based Americana singer and songwriter from Livingston, Texas.

== Career ==
Eli worked on oil and gas pipelines before starting to write and play music in his early twenties. His musical influences include the Rolling Stones, Steve Earle, Tom Petty, Guy Clark, the Eagles and the Byrds.

Eli began touring with various country and rock bands in 1984. He began fronting his own band and performing original music around 1990, and has toured throughout the country. His first album, Something's Going On, was released in 1994. The album was one of a number of Austin produced albums that helped establish Austin's national music reputation in that era. His album was among the first wave of music that eventually became known as Americana, but at the time of its release there was no single genre label that fit. Music journalists variously referred to Eli's music as "stand-and-deliver rock 'n' roll", "roots-rock" and "countrified pop songs". His album Hell Yeah! was listed in the Roots Music Report's Top 100 Roots Country Albums of 2011.

Eli is involved in fundraising efforts for autism groups, and has a son with autism.

Among the many musicians Eli has had in his band over the last years was bassist Joseph Stack (ca. 2005–2007). Stack is now more widely known for flying his private plane into an Austin IRS office in 2010, killing himself and one other, as well as injuring 13.

== Discography ==
- 1994 Something's Going On (Music Lane/Club De Musique)
- 2001 Trailer Parker Angel (Dusty Records)
- 2006 Amped Out (Errant Records)
- 2011 Hell Yeah! (Errant Records)
- 2013 The UnExplainable Billy Eli (Errant Records)
