= List of Live with Regis and Kelly episodes =

Live with Regis and Kelly was the 2001–2011 title of a long-running American syndicated morning talk show. Regis Philbin and Kelly Ripa were the hosts in that period.

== Season 14 (2001–2002) ==
=== September 2001 ===
| Date | Co-Hosts | "Host Chat" | Guests/Segments |
|---|---|---|---|
| September 3 | Regis Philbin & Kelly Ripa | Yes | Jeff Gordon, Michael Michele, Ingo Rademacher, Back to School Backpacks |
| September 4 | Regis Philbin & Kelly Ripa | Yes | Barbara Walters, Topher Grace, Ashley Martin |
| September 5 | Regis Philbin & Kelly Ripa | Yes | Jamie Foxx, Molly Ringwald, Claudia Cohen |
| September 6 | Regis Philbin & Kelly Ripa | Yes | Regis Tours Notre Dame, Vivica A. Fox, Mark Wahlberg |
| September 7 | Regis Philbin & Kelly Ripa | Yes | Alan Alda, Look into the Future, MTV Video Music Awards |
| September 10 | Regis Philbin & Kelly Ripa | Yes | Lou Diamond Phillips, Jamiroquai, Kid Inventor's Week |
| September 11 | Regis Philbin & Kelly Ripa | Yes; This episode lasts around nine minutes, beginning after the first plane hit the World Trade Center. After the second plane hit the second tower, the episode ended, replaced by WABC-TV's Eyewitness News. | No; Joan Rivers and Gina Philips of Jeepers Creepers (along with the Young Inventor's Week segment and the Camut Band) were planned, but canceled due to the September 11 attacks. Joan Rivers would later appear on the Halloween episode during October 31, 2001. |
| September 12 | No Suspended for a week following the September 11 attacks | | |
| September 13 | No Suspended for a week following the September 11 attacks | | |
| September 14 | No Suspended for a week following the September 11 attacks | | |
| September 17 | No Rerun of April episode | | |
| September 18 | Regis Philbin & Kelly Ripa | Yes | Special Edition to remembering September 11 attacks, with a pre-taped footage of Regis visiting Ground Zero, with a guest of the WABC-TV reporter NJ Burkett, child psychiatrist Harold S. Koplewicz, and talk show host Iyanla Vanzant |
| September 19 | Regis Philbin & Kelly Ripa | Yes | Susan Lucci, The Camut Band, Michele Lee |
| September 20 | Regis Philbin & Kelly Ripa | Yes | Tony Danza, Tori Amos, Ian McKellen |
| September 21 | Regis Philbin & Kelly Ripa | Yes | Kathleen Turner |
| September 24 | Regis Philbin & Kelly Ripa | Yes | Miss America 2002 Katie Harman, Lee Greenwood, Will Kirby and Shannon Dragoo of Big Brother 2 |
| September 25 | Regis Philbin & Kelly Ripa | Yes | Michael Douglas, Roma Downey, Bernadette Peters |
| September 26 | Regis Philbin & Kelly Ripa | Yes | Breckin Meyer of Inside Schwartz, Brittany Murphy, Jon Secada |
| September 27 | Regis Philbin & Kelly Ripa | Yes | Jason Alexander of Bob Patterson, Brittany Murphy, Jon Secada |
| September 28 | Regis Philbin & Kelly Ripa | Yes | Ben Stiller, RENT, Ms. Greenthumbs |

=== October 2001 ===
| Date | Co-Hosts | "Host Chat" | Guests/Segments |
|---|---|---|---|
| October 31 | Regis Philbin & Kelly Ripa | Yes | Mark Consuelos, Michael Joseph Consuelos, Peter Boyle, Joan Rivers |

=== February 2002 ===
| Date | Co-Hosts | "Host Chat" | Guests/Segments |
|---|---|---|---|
| February 27 | Regis Philbin & Kelly Ripa | Yes | Ethan Zohn, David James Elliott, Carmen Electra, Dave Navarro, June Ambrose |
| February 28 | Regis Philbin & Kelly Ripa | Yes | Howie Mandel, Ethan Zohn, Bando Jonez, June Ambrose |

=== August 2002 ===
| Date | Co-hosts | "Host Chat" | Guests/segments |
|---|---|---|---|
| August 16 | Regis Philbin & Joanna Philbin | Yes | Molly Ringwald, Anthony Michael Hall |
| August 22 | Regis Philbin & Kelly Ripa | Yes | Chris Rock, Michael J. Fox, Dirty Vegas, Nigella Lawson |

== Season 15 (2002–2003) ==
=== March 2003 ===
| Date | Co-hosts | "Host Chat" | Guests/segments |
|---|---|---|---|
| March 28 | Regis Philbin & Joy Philbin | Yes | Chris Rock, Aaron Eckhart |

== Season 16 (2003–2004) ==
=== October 2003 ===
| Date | Co-Hosts | "Host Chat" | Guests/Segments |
|---|---|---|---|
| October 29 | Kelly Ripa & Pat Sajak | Yes | Courteney Cox, Ben McKenzie |
| October 31 | Regis Philbin & Kelly Ripa | Yes | Courtney Thorne-Smith, Doris Roberts, The Wiggles Live's Annual Halloween Costume Contest |

=== November 2003 ===
| Date | Co-Hosts | "Host Chat" | Guests/Segments |
|---|---|---|---|
| November 7 | Regis Philbin & Kelly Ripa | Yes | Keanu Reeves, Michael Vartan, Kristan Cunningham |

=== January 2004 ===
| Date | Co-Hosts | "Host Chat" | Guests/Segments |
|---|---|---|---|
| January 23 | Regis Philbin & Kelly Ripa | Yes | Sarah Jessica Parker, Russell Crowe, Jack Black, Shaun White |

=== March 2004 ===
| Date | Co-Hosts | "Host Chat" | Guests/Segments |
|---|---|---|---|
| March 9 | Regis Philbin & Kelly Ripa | Yes | Maria Bello, Leo Laporte |
| March 11 | Regis Philbin & Kelly Ripa | Yes | Frankie Muniz, Marlo Thomas |

=== May 2004 ===
| Date | Co-Hosts | "Host Chat" | Guests/Segments |
|---|---|---|---|
| May 4 | Regis Philbin & Kelly Ripa | Yes | Maria Shriver, Faith Ford |

== Season 17 (2004–2005) ==
=== September 2004 ===
| Date | Co-Hosts | "Host Chat" | Guests/Segments |
|---|---|---|---|
| September 6 | Regis Philbin & Kelly Ripa | Yes | Reese Witherspoon, Andy Richter, Jill Scott |
| September 7 | Regis Philbin & Kelly Ripa | Yes | Bette Midler, John Edward |
| September 8 | Regis Philbin & Kelly Ripa | Yes | Chris Rock, Duane Chapman |
| September 9 | Regis Philbin & Kelly Ripa | Yes | Donald Trump, Martin Short, Mase |
| September 10 | Regis Philbin & Kelly Ripa | Yes | Ray Romano, Rupert Boneham |
| September 13 | Regis Philbin & Kelly Ripa | Yes | Heather Locklear, Tony Danza, Denise Richards |
| September 14 | Regis Philbin & Kelly Ripa | Yes | Bernie Mac, Misty May, Kerri Walsh |
| September 15 | Regis Philbin & Kelly Ripa | Yes | Debra Messing, Wayne Brady |
| September 16 | Regis Philbin & Kelly Ripa | Yes | Alec Baldwin, Jeff Probst |
| September 17 | Regis Philbin & Kelly Ripa | Yes | Dennis Franz, Nick Lachey |
| September 20 | Regis Philbin & Kelly Ripa | Yes | Melina Kanakaredes, Lil Romeo |
| September 21 | Regis Philbin & Kelly Ripa | Yes | John Kerry, Tiger Woods, Gary Sinise |
| September 22 | Regis Philbin & Kelly Ripa | Yes | Faith Ford, Ashlee Simpson |
| September 23 | Regis Philbin & Kelly Ripa | Yes | Katie Holmes, Elvis Costello |
| September 24 | Regis Philbin & Kelly Ripa | No | LIVE's 2004 Relly Awards |
| September 27 | Regis Philbin & Kelly Ripa | Yes | James Belushi, Dean Cain |
| September 28 | Regis Philbin & Kelly Ripa | Yes | Christopher Walken, Eve, Mia Hamm |
| September 29 | Regis Philbin & Kelly Ripa | Yes | John Goodman, Yao Ming, Ciara |
| September 30 | Regis Philbin & Kelly Ripa | Yes | Joaquin Phoenix, Sara Rue, Shaquille O'Neal |

=== October 2004 ===
| Date | Co-Hosts | "Host Chat" | Guests/Segments |
|---|---|---|---|
| October 1 | Regis Philbin & Kelly Ripa | Yes | John Travolta, Barney |
| October 4 | Regis Philbin & Kelly Ripa | Yes | Claire Danes, Carson Kressley, Austin Stevens |
| October 5 | Regis Philbin & Kelly Ripa | Yes | Jimmy Fallon, Pauly Shore, Scissor Sisters |
| October 6 | Regis Philbin & Kelly Ripa | Yes | Annette Bening, The Hives, Kelly Osbourne |
| October 7 | Regis Philbin & Kelly Ripa | Yes | John Edwards, Drew Carey, Queen Latifah |
| October 8 | Regis Philbin & Kelly Ripa | Yes | Billy Bob Thornton, Anthony Kiedis |
| October 11 | Regis Philbin & Kelly Ripa | Yes | Mark Wahlberg, Carmen Electra |
| October 12 | Regis Philbin & Kelly Ripa | Yes | Richard Gere, Christina Milian |
| October 13 | Regis Philbin & Kelly Ripa | Yes | Susan Sarandon, Duran Duran |
| October 14 | Regis Philbin & Kelly Ripa | Yes | Jennifer Lopez, Bill O'Reilly, Kanye West |
| October 15 | Regis Philbin & Kelly Ripa | Yes | Kristin Davis, The Wiggles |
| October 18 | Regis Philbin & Kelly Ripa | Yes | Celine Dion, Tatum O'Neal |
| October 19 | Regis Philbin & Kelly Ripa | Yes | Laura Bush, Marisa Tomei, k.d. lang |
| October 20 | Regis Philbin & Kelly Ripa | Yes | Christine Lahti, Brigitte Nielsen |
| October 21 | Regis Philbin & Kelly Ripa | Yes | Sean Combs, Ozzy & Sharon Osbourne |
| October 22 | Regis Philbin & Kelly Ripa | Yes | Sarah Michelle Gellar, Jeff Probst |
| October 25 | Regis Philbin & Kelly Ripa | Yes | Martin Short, Judge Judy Sheindlin |
| October 26 | Regis Philbin & Kelly Ripa | Yes | Dustin Hoffman, Emeril Lagasse, Hall & Oates |
| October 27 | Regis Philbin & Kelly Ripa | Yes | Hank Azaria, Michael McDonald |
| October 28 | Regis Philbin & Kelly Ripa | Yes | Kathryn Morris, Eva Longoria |
| October 29 | Regis Philbin & Kelly Ripa | Yes | Kevin Sorbo, Jennifer Tilly |

=== November 2004 ===
| Date | Co-Hosts | "Host Chat" | Guests/Segments |
|---|---|---|---|
| November 1 | Regis Philbin & Kelly Ripa | Yes | Nicole Kidman, Seth Meyers, Will Forte |
| November 2 | Regis Philbin & Kelly Ripa | Yes | Jude Law, Laura Prepon, Ruben Studdard |
| November 3 | Regis Philbin & Kelly Ripa | Yes | Whoopi Goldberg, Tommy Lee, Carly Patterson |
| November 4 | Regis Philbin & Kelly Ripa | Yes | Matt LeBlanc, Mischa Barton, Rachael Ray |
| November 5 | Regis Philbin & Kelly Ripa | Yes | Nicollette Sheridan, Jay-Z |
| November 8 | Regis Philbin & Kelly Ripa | Yes | David Letterman, Tyra Banks |
| November 9 | Regis Philbin & Kelly Ripa | Yes | Tom Hanks, Seal |
| November 10 | Regis Philbin & Kelly Ripa | Yes | Salma Hayek, Alicia Keys |
| November 11 | Regis Philbin & Kelly Ripa | Yes | Pierce Brosnan, Adam Brody, Tony Bennett |
| November 12 | Regis Philbin & Kelly Ripa | Yes | Liam Neeson, Marcia Cross |
| November 15 | Regis Philbin & Kelly Ripa | Yes | Dan Aykroyd, Los Lonely Boys |
| November 16 | Regis Philbin & Kelly Ripa | Yes | Tim Allen, Caroline Rhea |
| November 17 | Regis Philbin & Kelly Ripa | Yes | Nicolas Cage, Dame Edna |
| November 18 | Regis Philbin & Kelly Ripa | Yes | Renée Zellweger, Clay Aiken |
| November 19 | Regis Philbin & Kelly Ripa | Yes | Hugh Grant, Rosario Dawson |
| November 22 | Regis Philbin & Kelly Ripa | Yes | Colin Firth, Paul Reubens, Fantasia Barrino |
| November 23 | Regis Philbin & Kelly Ripa | Yes | Jerry Seinfeld, Ryan Cabrera |
| November 24 | Regis Philbin & Kelly Ripa | Yes | Colin Farrell, Eric McCormack |
| November 26 | Regis Philbin & Kelly Ripa | Yes | Kelsey Grammer |
| November 29 | Regis Philbin & Kelly Ripa | Yes | Peter Gallagher, Kurt Busch, Kenny G, Yolanda Adams |
| November 30 | Regis Philbin & Kelly Ripa | Yes | Geoffrey Rush, Lance Armstrong, Five for Fighting |

=== December 2004 ===
| Date | Co-Hosts | "Host Chat" | Guests/Segments |
|---|---|---|---|
| December 1 | Regis Philbin & Kelly Ripa | Yes | Nick Lachey, Jessica Biel |
| December 2 | Regis Philbin & Kelly Ripa | Yes | Noah Wyle, Jimmy Buffett, Frank Pellegrino |
| December 3 | Regis Philbin & Kelly Ripa | Yes | Ryan Reynolds, Phil Keoghan, Shawn Colvin |
| December 6 | Regis Philbin & Kelly Ripa | Yes | Kyra Sedgwick, Ludacris, Leo Laporte |
| December 7 | Regis Philbin & Kelly Ripa | Yes | Tom Cavanagh, Barenaked Ladies |
| December 8 | Regis Philbin & Kelly Ripa | Yes | Anna Paquin, Diana DeGarmo |
| December 9 | Regis Philbin & Kelly Ripa | Yes | Jimmy Carter, Lindsay Lohan |
| December 10 | Regis Philbin & Kelly Ripa | Yes | Clint Black |
| December 13 | Regis Philbin & Kelly Ripa | Yes | Kate Bosworth, Jason Bateman, Jadakiss |
| December 14 | Regis Philbin & Kelly Ripa | Yes | Jim Carrey, Sarah McLachlan, Joy Philbin |
| December 15 | Regis Philbin & Kelly Ripa | Yes | Kevin Spacey, Téa Leoni, Ashanti |
| December 16 | Regis Philbin & Kelly Ripa | Yes | Cate Blanchett, Donald Trump, Avril Lavigne |
| December 17 | Regis Philbin & Kelly Ripa | Yes | Adam Sandler, Mario, winner of America's Next Top Model |
| December 20 | Regis Philbin & Kelly Ripa | Yes | Willem Dafoe, Katie Brown, winner of The Apprentice |
| December 21 | Regis Philbin & Kelly Ripa | Yes | Kenan Thompson |
| December 22 | Regis Philbin & Alicia Keys | Yes | Dennis Quaid, Rachael Ray |
| December 23 | Regis Philbin & Kelly Ripa | Yes | John Travolta, Missy Elliott, Lenny Kravitz |
| December 24 | Regis Philbin & Kelly Ripa | Yes | Christmas Eve Pyjama Party |

=== January 2005 ===
| Date | Co-Hosts | "Host Chat" | Guests/Segments |
|---|---|---|---|
| January 10 | Regis Philbin & Kelly Ripa | Yes | Kevin Bacon, Jamie Lynn Spears |
| January 11 | Regis Philbin & Kelly Ripa | Yes | Susan Lucci |
| January 12 | Regis Philbin & Kelly Ripa | Yes | Taye Diggs |
| January 13 | Regis Philbin & Kelly Ripa | Yes | Billy Crystal, Topher Grace, Rachel Bilson |
| January 14 | Regis Philbin & Kelly Ripa | Yes | Marg Helgenberger, Ryan Seacrest |
| January 17 | Regis Philbin & Kelly Ripa | Yes | John Leguizamo |
| January 18 | Regis Philbin & Kelly Ripa | Yes | Laurence Fishburne, Ted McGinley |
| January 19 | Regis Philbin & Kelly Ripa | Yes | Donald Trump, Jeff Probst, Ice Cube |
| January 20 | Regis Philbin & Kelly Ripa | Yes | Richard Marx |
| January 21 | Regis Philbin & Kelly Ripa | Yes | Nicole Richie, Robert Downey Jr. |
| January 24 | Regis Philbin & Kelly Ripa | Yes | Ethan Hawke, Aisha Tyler |
| January 25 | Regis Philbin & Kelly Ripa | Yes | Chad Michael Murray, LeAnn Rimes, Claudia Cohen |
| January 26 | Regis Philbin & Kelly Ripa | Yes | Jeff Gordon, Emma Bunton |
| January 27 | Regis Philbin & Kelly Ripa | Yes | Drea de Matteo, Jeff Gordon |
| January 28 | Regis Philbin & Kelly Ripa | Yes | Jimmy Kimmel |
| January 31 | Regis Philbin & Kelly Ripa | Yes | Billy Crystal |

=== February 2005 ===
| Date | Co-Hosts | "Host Chat" | Guests/Segments |
|---|---|---|---|
| February 1 | Regis Philbin & Kelly Ripa | Yes | Debra Messing, Rachel Bilson, Joe Cocker |
| February 2 | Regis Philbin & Kelly Ripa | Yes | Kim Delaney, Duran Duran |
| February 3 | Regis Philbin & Kelly Ripa | Yes | Amanda Bynes, Tina Turner, Henry Winkler |
| February 4 | Regis Philbin & Kelly Ripa | Yes | Harvey Fierstein |
| February 7 | Regis Philbin & Kelly Ripa | Yes | Simon Cowell, Josh Duhamel, Tina Turner |
| February 8 | Regis Philbin & Kelly Ripa | Yes | Sigourney Weaver, Benjamin McKenzie |
| February 9 | Regis Philbin & Kelly Ripa | Yes | Kevin James, Brian McKnight |
| February 10 | Regis Philbin & Kelly Ripa | Yes | David Spade |
| February 11 | Regis Philbin & Kelly Ripa | Yes | Wedding vows are exchanged on the set. |
| February 14 | Regis Philbin & Kelly Ripa | No | LIVE's Lost Love Valentine's Wedding |
| February 15 | Regis Philbin & Kelly Ripa | Yes | Jeff Probst, Shia LaBeouf, "Lost Love Wedding" reception |
| February 16 | Regis Philbin & Kelly Ripa | Yes | James Spader, Tom Selleck |
| February 17 | Regis Philbin & Kelly Ripa | Yes | Keanu Reeves, Tony Danza |
| February 18 | Regis Philbin & Kelly Ripa | Yes | Charlie Sheen, Matthew Fox |
| February 21 | Regis Philbin & Kelly Ripa | Yes | Valerie Bertinelli, Ashlee Simpson, Beautiful Baby Week |
| February 22 | Regis Philbin & Kelly Ripa | Yes | Raven-Symoné, Tori Amos, Beautiful Baby Week |
| February 23 | Regis Philbin & Kelly Ripa | Yes | Joan Rivers, Hilary & Haylie Duff, Beautiful Baby Week |
| February 24 | Regis Philbin & Kelly Ripa | Yes | Amanda Bynes, Michelle Williams, Beautiful Baby Week |
| February 25 | Regis Philbin & Kelly Ripa | Yes | Omar Epps, Claudia Cohen, Beautiful Baby Week |
| February 28 | Regis Philbin & Kelly Ripa | Yes | Lori Loughlin, Faith Ford, Claudia Cohen |

=== March 2005 ===
| Date | Co-Hosts | "Host Chat" | Guests/Segments |
|---|---|---|---|
| March 1 | Regis Philbin & Kelly Ripa | Yes | Dwayne Johnson, Gisele Bundchen |
| March 2 | Regis Philbin & Kelly Ripa | Yes | John Travolta |
| March 3 | Regis Philbin & Kelly Ripa | Yes | Vin Diesel, Mötley Crüe |
| March 4 | Regis Philbin & Kelly Ripa | Yes | Halle Berry, Christina Milian |
| March 7 | Regis Philbin & Kelly Ripa | Yes | Sylvester Stallone, Christopher Byrne |
| March 8 | Regis Philbin & Kelly Ripa | Yes | Greg Kinnear, George Lopez |
| March 9 | Regis Philbin & Kelly Ripa | Yes | Robin Williams, Nigella Lawson |
| March 10 | Regis Philbin & Kelly Ripa | Yes | John Stamos, John Lithgow |
| March 10 | Regis Philbin & Kelly Ripa | Yes | John Stamos, John Lithgow |

== Season 18 (2005–2006) ==
=== September 2005 ===
| Date | Co-hosts | "Host Chat" | Guests/segments |
|---|---|---|---|
| September 5 | Regis Philbin & Kelly Ripa | Yes | Paul Reiser, Kristin Cavallari, Avenue Q |
| September 6 | Regis Philbin & Kelly Ripa | Yes | Doug Savant, Jamie Lynn Spears, Jamie Oliver |
| September 7 | Regis Philbin & Kelly Ripa | Yes | Morgan Freeman, Susan Lucci, Joss Stone |
| September 8 | Regis Philbin & Kelly Ripa | Yes | Samuel L. Jackson, Tony Danza |
| September 9 | Regis Philbin & Kelly Ripa | Yes | Jennifer Lopez, Eugene Levy |
| September 12 | Regis Philbin & Kelly Ripa | Yes | Eva Longoria, Hugh Laurie, Michael Bolton, Guinness World Record Breaker Week |
| September 13 | Regis Philbin & Kelly Ripa | Yes | Joan Rivers, The Dandy Warhols, Guinness World Record Breaker Week |
| September 14 | Regis Philbin & Kelly Ripa | Yes | Jodie Foster, Jeff Probst, Guinness World Record Breaker Week |
| September 15 | Regis Philbin & Kelly Ripa | Yes | Reese Witherspoon, Guinness World Record Breaker Week |
| September 16 | Regis Philbin & Kelly Ripa | Yes | Anthony Hopkins, Lara Flynn Boyle, Guinness World Record Breaker Week |
| September 19 | Regis Philbin & Kelly Ripa | Yes | Caroline Rhea, Eddie Cibrian |
| September 20 | Regis Philbin & Kelly Ripa | Yes | Donald Trump, Jo Frost, Ryan Cabrera |
| September 21 | Regis Philbin & Kelly Ripa | Yes | Benjamin Bratt, Julian McMahon |
| September 22 | Regis Philbin & Kelly Ripa | Yes | Marg Helgenberger |
| September 23 | Regis Philbin & Kelly Ripa | No | LIVE's 2005 Relly Awards |
| September 26 | Regis Philbin & Kelly Ripa | Yes | Denise Richards, George Lopez, Boz Scaggs |
| September 27 | Regis Philbin & Kelly Ripa | Yes | Geena Davis, Emma Roberts, Toni Braxton |
| September 28 | Regis Philbin & Kelly Ripa | Yes | Jessica Alba, Amanda Bynes, Gretchen Wilson |
| September 29 | Regis Philbin & Kelly Ripa | Yes | Matt LeBlanc, Shia LaBeouf, So You Think You Can Dance castoff |
| September 30 | Regis Philbin & Kelly Ripa | Yes | Teri Hatcher, Raven-Symoné |

=== October 2005 ===
| Date | Co-hosts | "Host Chat" | Guests/segments |
|---|---|---|---|
| October 3 | Regis Philbin & Kelly Ripa | Yes | Bill O'Reilly, Faith Ford |
| October 4 | Regis Philbin & Kelly Ripa | Yes | Julianne Moore, Brooke Shields, Air Supply |
| October 5 | Regis Philbin & Kelly Ripa | Yes | Freddie Prinze Jr., Clint Black, Top of the Year Awards |
| October 6 | Regis Philbin & Kelly Ripa | Yes | Matthew McConaughey, Shannon Elizabeth, So You Think You Can Dance winner |
| October 7 | Regis Philbin & Kelly Ripa | Yes | Common |
| October 10 | Regis Philbin & Kelly Ripa | Yes | Denis Leary, George Huff |
| October 11 | Regis Philbin & Kelly Ripa | Yes | Orlando Bloom, Gloria Estefan |
| October 12 | Regis Philbin & Kelly Ripa | Yes | Kirsten Dunst |
| October 13 | Regis Philbin & Kelly Ripa | Yes | Charlize Theron, Rev Run |
| October 14 | Regis Philbin & Kelly Ripa | Yes | Dylan Walsh |
| October 17 | Regis Philbin & Kelly Ripa | Yes | Dakota Fanning, Simply Red, Project Schulewis |
| October 18 | Regis Philbin & Kelly Ripa | Yes | Stevie Wonder, Ashlee Simpson, Project Schulewis |
| October 19 | Regis Philbin & Kelly Ripa | Yes | Woody Harrelson, Sumo Wrestlers, Project Schulewis |
| October 20 | Regis Philbin & Kelly Ripa | Yes | Dwayne Johnson, Ricky Martin, Amerie, Project Schulewis |
| October 21 | Regis Philbin & Kelly Ripa | Yes | Val Kilmer, Melissa Etheridge, Project Schulewis |
| October 24 | Regis Philbin & Kelly Ripa | Yes | William Shatner, Frankie J |
| October 25 | Regis Philbin & Kelly Ripa | Yes | Uma Thurman, Tom Joyner |
| October 26 | Regis Philbin & Kelly Ripa | Yes | Antonio Banderas, Zach Braff |
| October 27 | Regis Philbin & Kelly Ripa | Yes | Nicolas Cage, Courtney Thorne-Smith, Animal expert Peter Gros |
| October 28 | Regis Philbin & Kelly Ripa | Yes | Jay Leno, a Halloween fashion show |
| October 31 | Regis Philbin & Kelly Ripa | Yes | LIVE's Halloween Spectacular, Jamie Foxx |

=== November 2005 ===
| Date | Co-hosts | "Host Chat" | Guests/segments |
|---|---|---|---|
| November 1 | Regis Philbin & Kelly Ripa | Yes | Billy Crystal, Mike Wallace |
| November 2 | Regis Philbin & Kelly Ripa | Yes | Terrence Howard, Philip Seymour Hoffman, Kirk Franklin |
| November 3 | Regis Philbin & Kelly Ripa | Yes | James Spader |
| November 4 | Regis Philbin & Kelly Ripa | Yes | Jake Gyllenhaal |
| November 7 | Regis Philbin & Kelly Ripa | Yes | Josh Duhamel, Simon Cowell |
| November 8 | Regis Philbin & Kelly Ripa | Yes | 50 Cent, Peter Gallagher |
| November 9 | Regis Philbin & Kelly Ripa | Yes | Melina Kanakaredes, LeAnn Rimes, Keira Knightley |
| November 10 | Regis Philbin & Kelly Ripa | Yes | Robert Downey Jr., Carrot Top, Daniel Radcliffe |
| November 11 | Regis Philbin & Kelly Ripa | Yes | Steve Martin, Nicole Richie, Anderson Cooper |
| November 14 | Regis Philbin & Kelly Ripa | Yes | Richard Gere, Donald Sutherland, Joy Philbin |
| November 15 | Regis Philbin & Kelly Ripa | Yes | Reese Witherspoon, Emma Watson |
| November 16 | Regis Philbin & Kelly Ripa | Yes | Joaquin Phoenix, Jesse L. Martin |
| November 17 | Regis Philbin & Kelly Ripa | Yes | Rosario Dawson |
| November 18 | Regis Philbin & Kelly Ripa | Yes | Patricia Arquette |
| November 21 | Regis Philbin & Kelly Ripa | Yes | Usher, Alanis Morissette |
| November 22 | Regis Philbin & Kelly Ripa | Yes | Judy Sheindlin, Bradley Cooper |
| November 23 | Regis Philbin & Kelly Ripa | Yes | A Seinfeld reunion featuring Jerry Seinfeld, Julia Louis-Dreyfus, Jason Alexander and Michael Richards |
| November 25 | Regis Philbin & Kelly Ripa | Yes | Lake Bell, John Leguizamo, Jeff Garlin |
| November 28 | Regis Philbin & Kelly Ripa | Yes | Felicity Huffman, Carl Edwards |
| November 29 | Regis Philbin & Kelly Ripa | Yes | Barbara Walters, Tom Arnold, Scott Stapp |
| November 30 | Regis Philbin & Kelly Ripa | Yes | Naomi Watts, Chris Brown, a segment on The Biggest Loser |

=== December 2005 ===
| Date | Co-hosts | "Host Chat" | Guests/segments |
|---|---|---|---|
| December 1 | Regis Philbin & Kelly Ripa | Yes | Alan Alda, Click Five |
| December 2 | Regis Philbin & Kelly Ripa | Yes | Jerry Lewis |
| December 5 | Regis Philbin & Kelly Ripa | Yes | Adrien Brody, Gisele Bündchen, Anthony Hamilton, Holiday Gift Giving Week |
| December 6 | Regis Philbin & Kelly Ripa | Yes | Lindsay Lohan, Ashanti, Holiday Gift Giving Week |
| December 7 | Regis Philbin & Kelly Ripa | Yes | Holiday Gift Giving Week |
| December 8 | Regis Philbin & Kelly Ripa | Yes | Michael Rosenbaum, Anthony Hamilton, Holiday Gift Giving Week |
| December 9 | Kelly Ripa & Mark Consuelos | Yes | Ellen Pompeo, Bo Bice, Holiday Gift Giving Week |
| December 12 | Regis Philbin & Kelly Ripa | Yes | Charles Barkley, Il Divo, a segment on Survivor |
| December 13 | Regis Philbin & Kelly Ripa | Yes | Jack Black, Dermot Mulroney, Constantine Maroulis |
| December 14 | Regis Philbin & Kelly Ripa | Yes | Sarah Jessica Parker, Donald Trump |
| December 15 | Regis Philbin & Kelly Ripa | Yes | Luke Wilson, Howie Mandel, Trans-Siberian Orchestra |
| December 16 | Regis Philbin & Kelly Ripa | Yes | Jennifer Aniston, Michael McDonald |
| December 19 | Regis Philbin & Joy Philbin | Yes | Johnny Knoxville, Jason Kidd, the winner of The Apprentice |
| December 20 | Regis Philbin & Bonnie Hunt | Yes | Steve Martin, Vanessa Minnillo, B5 |
| December 21 | Regis Philbin & Kelly Ripa | Yes | Téa Leoni, Jamie Foxx |
| December 22 | Regis Philbin & Kelly Ripa | Yes | Sienna Miller, Triple H, Claudia Cohen discusses celebrities' holiday plans |
| December 23 | Regis Philbin & Kelly Ripa | Yes | LIVE's Holiday Celebration, Glenn Close, Barenaked Ladies, Disney on Ice |

=== January 2006 ===
| Date | Co-hosts | "Host Chat" | Guests/segments |
|---|---|---|---|
| January 9 | Regis Philbin & Kelly Ripa | Yes | Heather Graham, John Stamos |
| January 10 | Regis Philbin & Kelly Ripa | Yes | Vanessa Williams, Anne Hathaway |
| January 11 | Regis Philbin & Kelly Ripa | Yes | Scarlett Johansson, Evangeline Lilly, Terrence Howard |
| January 12 | Regis Philbin & Kelly Ripa | Yes | Queen Latifah, Emily Procter |
| January 13 | Regis Philbin & Kelly Ripa | Yes | Kyle MacLachlan, Kiefer Sutherland |
| January 16 | Regis Philbin & Kelly Ripa | Yes | Terrence Howard, Chad Michael Murray |
| January 17 | Regis Philbin & Kelly Ripa | Yes | Martin Lawrence, Jason Priestley |
| January 18 | Regis Philbin & Kelly Ripa | Yes | Josh Lucas, S. Epatha Merkerson |
| January 19 | Regis Philbin & Kelly Ripa | Yes | Rose McGowan |
| January 20 | Kelly Ripa & Jeff Gordon | Yes | Jeff Gordon |
| January 23 | Kelly Ripa & Sam Champion | Yes | Tia Carrere, Barney the purple dinosaur & Jennifer Berry |
| January 24 | Kelly Ripa & D. L. Hughley | Yes | Anthony Hopkins, Natasha Bedingfield |
| January 25 | Kelly Ripa & Bernie Mac | Yes | Emma Thompson, Il Divo |
| January 26 | Kelly Ripa & John O'Hurley | Yes | Enya, an Oscar report by Claudia Cohen |
| January 30 | Regis Philbin & Kelly Ripa | Yes | Kristin Cavallari, Dancing with the Stars castoffs |
| January 31 | Regis Philbin & Kelly Ripa | Yes | Meredith Vieira, Randy Jackson |

=== February 2006 ===
| Date | Co-hosts | "Host Chat" | Guests/segments |
|---|---|---|---|
| February 1 | Regis Philbin & Kelly Ripa | Yes | Jeff Probst |
| February 2 | Regis Philbin & Kelly Ripa | Yes | Bette Midler |
| February 3 | Regis Philbin & Kelly Ripa | Yes | Sean Paul |
| February 6 | Regis Philbin & Kelly Ripa | Yes | Roseanne Barr, Dancing with the Stars castoffs, Wedding Week |
| February 7 | Regis Philbin & Kelly Ripa | Yes | Harrison Ford, Rachel Bilson, Wedding Week |
| February 8 | Regis Philbin & Kelly Ripa | Yes | Josh Holloway, Collective Soul, Wedding Week |
| February 9 | Regis Philbin & Kelly Ripa | Yes | Nicollette Sheridan, Wedding Week |
| February 10 | Regis Philbin & Kelly Ripa | No | LIVE's Wedding 2006 |
| February 13 | Regis Philbin & Kelly Ripa | Yes | Diddy |
| February 14 | Regis Philbin & Kelly Ripa | Yes | Edie Falco, Harry Connick Jr. |
| February 15 | Regis Philbin & Kelly Ripa | Yes | Julianne Moore, INXS |
| February 16 | Regis Philbin & Kelly Ripa | Yes | Joan Rivers |
| February 17 | Regis Philbin & Kelly Ripa | Yes | Simon Cowell |
| February 20 | Regis Philbin & Kelly Ripa | Yes | Cuba Gooding Jr. |
| February 22 | Regis Philbin & Kelly Ripa | Yes | Matthew Fox, Heidi Klum |
| February 23 | Regis Philbin & Kelly Ripa | Yes | Jimmy Fallon, Tyler Perry |
| February 24 | Regis Philbin & Kelly Ripa | Yes | Whoopi Goldberg, Lynn Whitfield |
| February 27 | Regis Philbin & Kelly Ripa | Yes | Donald Trump, Roger Ebert, Ray J |
| February 28 | Regis Philbin & Kelly Ripa | Yes | LIVE! in Los Angeles, Howie Mandel, Eva Longoria, a visit to the American Idol set |

=== March 2006 ===
| Date | Co-hosts | "Host Chat" | Guests/segments |
|---|---|---|---|
| March 1 | Regis Philbin & Kelly Ripa | Yes | LIVE! in Los Angeles, Melina Kanakaredes, Jimmy Kimmel, Brian McKnight |
| March 2 | Regis Philbin & Kelly Ripa | Yes | LIVE! in Los Angeles, Anthony LaPaglia, Bo Bice, Sasha Cohen, a visit to the set of CSI: Crime Scene Investigation |
| March 3 | Regis Philbin & Kelly Ripa | Yes | LIVE! in Los Angeles, Raven-Symoné, William H. Macy, Behind the Scenes with Kobe Bryant and other Los Angeles Lakers |
| March 6 | Regis Philbin & Kelly Ripa | Yes | Bill Paxton, an Oscar recap by Claudia Cohen |
| March 7 | Regis Philbin & Kelly Ripa | Yes | Jo Frost, Dennis Haysbert, Ne-Yo |
| March 8 | Regis Philbin & Kelly Ripa | Yes | Matthew McConaughey, Gretchen Wilson |
| March 9 | Regis Philbin & Kelly Ripa | Yes | Salma Hayek, Bradley Cooper |
| March 10 | Regis Philbin & Kelly Ripa | Yes | Kristin Davis, Idina Menzel |
| March 13 | Regis Philbin & Kelly Ripa | Yes | Julia Louis-Dreyfus, Ashley Parker Angel |
| March 14 | Regis Philbin & Kelly Ripa | Yes | Pat Sajak, Carrie Underwood |
| March 15 | Regis Philbin & Kelly Ripa | Yes | Ice-T |
| March 16 | Regis Philbin & Kelly Ripa | Yes | Vin Diesel, Ludacris, A report from the American International Toy Fair |
| March 17 | Regis Philbin & Kelly Ripa | Yes | Celtic Woman |
| March 20 | Regis Philbin & Joy Philbin | Yes | Wentworth Miller, Clive Owen, Chris Brown |
| March 21 | Regis Philbin & Joy Philbin | Yes | Michael Chiklis, Denzel Washington |
| March 22 | Regis Philbin & Joy Philbin | Yes | Dominic Chianese, Kurt Busch |
| March 23 | Regis Philbin & Lisa Rinna | Yes | Frankie Muniz, Cascada |
| March 24 | Regis Philbin & Wendie Malick | Yes | Jamie-Lynn Sigler, animal expert Peter Gros, a segment on Consumer Reports' Oyster Awards for packaging that is difficult to open |
| March 27 | Regis Philbin & Kelly Ripa | Yes | Shakira & Wyclef Jean, Chris Kattan, Larry the Cable Guy |
| March 28 | Regis Philbin & Kelly Ripa | Yes | Ray Romano, psychic Char Margolis |
| March 29 | Regis Philbin & Kelly Ripa | Yes | Queen Latifah, Richard Ashcroft |
| March 30 | Regis Philbin & Kelly Ripa | Yes | Josh Hartnett, Tori Spelling, the winner of the National Spelling Bee |

=== April 2006 ===
| Date | Co-hosts | "Host Chat" | Guests/segments |
|---|---|---|---|
| April 3 | Regis Philbin & Kelly Ripa | Yes | Antonio Banderas, Spring Fashion Week |
| April 4 | Regis Philbin & Kelly Ripa | Yes | Rebecca Romijn, Jon Voight, Spring Fashion Week |
| April 5 | Regis Philbin & Kelly Ripa | Yes | Lucy Liu, Spring Fashion Week |
| April 6 | Regis Philbin & Kelly Ripa | Yes | Julianna Margulies, Mario Batali, Spring Fashion Week |
| April 7 | Kelly Ripa & Randy Jackson | Yes | Spring Fashion Week |
| April 10 | Regis Philbin & Kelly Ripa | Yes | Carmen Electra, New York Auto Show Week |
| April 11 | Regis Philbin & Kelly Ripa | Yes | p!nk, Billy Crystal, New York Auto Show Week |
| April 12 | Regis Philbin & Kelly Ripa | Yes | Vanna White, New York Auto Show Week |
| April 13 | Regis Philbin & Kelly Ripa | Yes | Chris Rock, New York Auto Show Week |
| April 14 | Regis Philbin & Kelly Ripa | Yes | Hugh Grant, New York Auto Show Week |
| April 17 | Regis Philbin & Kelly Ripa | Yes | David Schwimmer, Barry Watson |
| April 18 | Regis Philbin & Kelly Ripa | Yes | Michael Douglas, Daniel Powter |
| April 19 | Regis Philbin & Kelly Ripa | Yes | Willem Dafoe, Drew Lachey, Avant |
| April 20 | Regis Philbin & Kelly Ripa | Yes | Craig Ferguson, Mandy Moore, Toto |
| April 21 | Regis Philbin & Kelly Ripa | Yes | Dennis Quaid, Rachael Ray, Cirque du Soleil |
| April 24 | Kelly Ripa & D. L. Hughley | Yes | Brooke Burns |
| April 25 | Regis Philbin & Kelly Ripa | Yes | Kristin Chenoweth, Rihanna |
| April 26 | Regis Philbin & Kelly Ripa | Yes | Robin Williams, Jenny McCarthy, Michael Eisner |
| April 27 | Regis Philbin & Kelly Ripa | Yes | Laurence Fishburne, Cheryl Hines, Paula Deen |
| April 28 | Regis Philbin & Kelly Ripa | Yes | Tom Selleck, Goo Goo Dolls, Ashley Tisdale |

=== May 2006 ===
| Date | Co-hosts | "Host Chat" | Guests/segments |
|---|---|---|---|
| May 1 | Regis Philbin & Kelly Ripa | Yes | Ving Rhames, a report on computer-imagined hairstyles |
| May 2 | Regis Philbin & Kelly Ripa | Yes | Jonathan Rhys Meyers, David Blaine, KT Tunstall |
| May 3 | Regis Philbin & Kelly Ripa | Yes | Tom Cruise |
| May 4 | Regis Philbin & Kelly Ripa | Yes | Michelle Rodriguez, Judy Sheindlin |
| May 5 | Regis Philbin & Kelly Ripa | Yes | Teri Hatcher, Jimmy Buffett, Sam Champion |
| May 8 | Regis Philbin & Kelly Ripa | Yes | Josh Lucas |
| May 9 | Regis Philbin & Kelly Ripa | Yes | Jaime Pressly, Nick Lachey |
| May 10 | Regis Philbin & Kelly Ripa | Yes | Michelle Monaghan |
| May 11 | Regis Philbin & Kelly Ripa | Yes | Celebrating moms |
| May 12 | Regis Philbin & Kelly Ripa | No | LIVE's Mom's Dream Come True Special |
| May 15 | Regis Philbin & Kelly Ripa | Yes | Nicollette Sheridan, Terry O'Quinn, Jeff Probst |
| May 16 | Regis Philbin & Kelly Ripa | Yes | James Spader, Christina Milian |
| May 17 | Regis Philbin & Kelly Ripa | Yes | Eric McCormack, Jennifer Garner |
| May 18 | Regis Philbin & Kelly Ripa | Yes | Jimmy Kimmel, Debra Messing |
| May 19 | Regis Philbin & Kelly Ripa | Yes | Tom Hanks, Patricia Arquette |
| May 22 | Regis Philbin & Kelly Ripa | Yes | LIVE! in Niagara Falls, Mary Lynn Rajskub, Ashley Parker Angel, America's Next Top Model |
| May 23 | Regis Philbin & Kelly Ripa | Yes | LIVE! in Niagara Falls, Dean Cain |
| May 24 | Regis Philbin & Kelly Ripa | Yes | Halle Berry |
| May 25 | Regis Philbin & Kelly Ripa | Yes | Hugh Jackman |
| May 26 | Regis Philbin & Kelly Ripa | Yes | LIVE! at Charlotte Motor Speedway, Paul Newman, Owen Wilson, Jesse James, Phil Vassar |
| May 29 | Kelly Ripa & Bryant Gumbel | Yes | Jennifer Aniston, Jeanne Tripplehorn, animal expert Peter Gros |
| May 30 | Kelly Ripa & Anderson Cooper | Yes | Mariah Carey, Larry the Cable Guy |
| May 31 | Kelly Ripa & Donald Trump | Yes | Patricia Heaton, Indianapolis 500 winner |

=== June 2006 ===
| Date | Co-hosts | "Host Chat" | Guests/segments |
|---|---|---|---|
| June 1 | Kelly Ripa & Vince Vaughn | Yes | Denis Leary |
| June 2 | Kelly Ripa & Jimmy Kimmel | Yes | Famke Janssen, Sandra Bernhard, Grill Friday |
| June 5 | Regis Philbin & Kelly Ripa | Yes | Kevin Connolly, Anna Paquin, Broadway Week |
| June 6 | Regis Philbin & Kelly Ripa | Yes | Ludacris, Julia Stiles, Broadway Week |
| June 7 | Regis Philbin & Kelly Ripa | Yes | Liev Schreiber, winner of The Apprentice, Broadway Week |
| June 8 | Regis Philbin & Kelly Ripa | Yes | Charles Gibson, Kyra Sedgwick, Broadway Week |
| June 9 | Regis Philbin & Kelly Ripa | Yes | Kevin Dillon, Bonnie Hunt, Broadway Week, Grill Friday |
| June 12 | Regis Philbin & Kelly Ripa | Yes | Julie Andrews, Lauren Conrad |
| June 13 | Regis Philbin & Kelly Ripa | Yes | Paris Hilton, Janice Dickinson |
| June 14 | Regis Philbin & Kelly Ripa | Yes | Rita Wilson |
| June 15 | Regis Philbin & Kelly Ripa | Yes | Keanu Reeves, a Father's Day report by Claudia Cohen |
| June 16 | Regis Philbin & Kelly Ripa | Yes | Sandra Bullock, David Krumholtz, Grill Friday |
| June 20 | Kelly Ripa & Jeff Gordon | Yes | Miley Cyrus, Wendie Malick, Corinne Bailey Rae |
| June 21 | Regis Philbin & Kelly Ripa | Yes | All-American Rejects |
| June 22 | Regis Philbin & Kelly Ripa | Yes | Adam Sandler, The Toy Guy Chris Byrne |
| June 23 | Regis Philbin & Kelly Ripa | Yes | Kate Beckinsale, Grill Friday |
| June 26 | Kelly Ripa & Carson Kressley | Yes | Def Leppard |
| June 27 | Regis Philbin & Kelly Ripa | Yes | Meryl Streep, Brandon Routh |
| June 28 | Regis Philbin & Kelly Ripa | Yes | Kate Bosworth |
| June 29 | Regis Philbin & Kelly Ripa | Yes | Anne Hathaway, India.Arie |
| June 30 | Regis Philbin & Kelly Ripa | Yes | Stanley Tucci, an update on Britain's royal family by Claudia Cohen, Grill Friday |

=== July 2006 ===
| Date | Co-hosts | "Host Chat" | Guests/segments |
|---|---|---|---|
| July 3 | Regis Philbin & Kelly Ripa | Yes | Jeremy Piven, Alexis Bledel, summer-entertainment advice |
| July 4 | Regis Philbin & Kelly Ripa | Yes | Performances by 2006 American Idol contestants including Kevin Covais, Mandisa, Kellie Pickler, Paris Bennett, Chris Daughtry, Elliott Yamin, Katharine McPhee and Taylor Hicks |
| July 5 | Regis Philbin & Kelly Ripa | Yes | Robert Downey Jr., James Marsden |
| July 6 | Regis Philbin & Kelly Ripa | Yes | Orlando Bloom |
| July 7 | Regis Philbin & Kelly Ripa | Yes | Bernadette Peters, piñata-party tips from Ingrid Hoffmann, psychic John Edward, Grill Friday |
| July 10 | Regis Philbin & Kelly Ripa | Yes | Tristan Rogers, Sugar Ray Leonard |
| July 11 | Regis Philbin & Kelly Ripa | Yes | Marlon, Shawn & Keenen Ivory Wayans, Venus Williams |
| July 12 | Regis Philbin & Kelly Ripa | Yes | Heidi Klum, Cheyenne Kimball |
| July 13 | Regis Philbin & Kelly Ripa | Yes | Owen Wilson, Rainn Wilson |
| July 14 | Regis Philbin & Kelly Ripa | Yes | Grill Friday |
| July 17 | Regis Philbin & Kelly Ripa | Yes | Luke Wilson |
| July 18 | Regis Philbin & Kelly Ripa | Yes | Paul Giamatti, Kevin Smith |
| July 19 | Regis Philbin & Kelly Ripa | Yes | Rosario Dawson |
| July 20 | Regis Philbin & Kelly Ripa | Yes | Bo Bice, Uma Thurman |
| July 21 | Regis Philbin & Kelly Ripa | Yes | Rescue Me Dream Team Ambush Makeovers, Grill Friday |
| July 24 | Regis Philbin & Kelly Ripa | Yes | Cameron Mathison, Dulé Hill |
| July 25 | Regis Philbin & Kelly Ripa | Yes | Ashanti, Colin Farrell, a kids soapbox derby |
| July 26 | Regis Philbin & Kelly Ripa | Yes | Jamie Foxx, Miss Universe |
| July 27 | Regis Philbin & Kelly Ripa | Yes | Jesse Metcalfe |
| July 28 | Kelly Ripa & Geraldo Rivera | Yes | Flavor Flav, LeToya, a kids bowling competition, Grill Friday |
| July 31 | Regis Philbin & Kelly Ripa | Yes | Jewel, Christopher Meloni, Raven-Symoné |

=== August 2006 ===
| Date | Co-hosts | "Host Chat" | Guests/segments |
|---|---|---|---|
| August 1 | Regis Philbin & Kelly Ripa | Yes | Will Ferrell, Paula DeAnda |
| August 2 | Regis Philbin & Kelly Ripa | Yes | John C. Reilly, Stephon Marbury, Cherish |
| August 3 | Regis Philbin & Kelly Ripa | Yes | Danny DeVito, Five for Fighting |
| August 4 | Kelly Ripa & Martin Short | Yes | Dale Earnhardt Jr., Ziggy Marley, Michael Nouri, Grill Friday |
| August 7 | Regis Philbin & Kelly Ripa | Yes | Maggie Gyllenhaal, Kristen Bell, Jody Watley |
| August 8 | Regis Philbin & Kelly Ripa | Yes | Christina Milian, Hulk Hogan, Eddie Money |
| August 9 | Regis Philbin & Kelly Ripa | Yes | Elisha Cuthbert |
| August 10 | Regis Philbin & Kelly Ripa | Yes | Michelle Wie, Rick Springfield, winner of Last Comic Standing |
| August 11 | Kelly Ripa & Emeril Lagasse | Yes | Loverboy, Grill Friday |
| August 14 | Regis Philbin & Kelly Ripa | Yes | Julianna Margulies, Cassie, The World's Greatest Family Recipe Search |
| August 15 | Regis Philbin & Kelly Ripa | Yes | Samuel L. Jackson, George Thorogood |
| August 16 | Regis Philbin & Kelly Ripa | Yes | Hilary Duff, Joan Rivers |
| August 17 | Kelly Ripa & Chris Isaak | Yes | Dominic Purcell, Fantasia Barrino |

== Season 19 (2006–2007) ==
=== September 2006 ===
| Date | Co-Hosts | "Host Chat" | Guests/Segments |
|---|---|---|---|
| September 4 | Regis Philbin & Kelly Ripa | Yes | Michael Bolton, Cheetah Girls, Dikembe Mutombo |
| September 5 | Regis Philbin & Kelly Ripa | Yes | Julianne Moore, Brad Garrett, KT Tunstall |
| September 6 | Regis Philbin & Kelly Ripa | Yes | David Duchovny, Daniel Powter, Mary Hart |
| September 7 | Regis Philbin & Kelly Ripa | Yes | Alan Alda, Rachel Bilson |
| September 8 | Regis Philbin & Kelly Ripa | Yes | Tommy Lee, David Boreanaz, John O'Hurley |
| September 12 | Regis Philbin & Kelly Ripa | Yes | Zach Braff, Toby Keith, Guinness World Record Breaker Week |
| September 13 | Regis Philbin & Kelly Ripa | Yes | Ashton Kutcher, Barenaked Ladies, Guinness World Record Breaker Week |
| September 14 | Regis Philbin & Kelly Ripa | Yes | Dwayne Johnson, Guinness World Record Breaker Week |
| September 15 | Kelly Ripa & Wilmer Valderrama | Yes | Usher, Guinness World Record Breaker Week |
| September 18 | Regis Philbin & Kelly Ripa | Yes | Ben Affleck, Howie Mandel |
| September 19 | Regis Philbin & Kelly Ripa | Yes | Martin Short, Jesse McCartney, James Franco, Rusty Wallace |
| September 20 | Regis Philbin & Kelly Ripa | Yes | Patrick Dempsey, Kenny Chesney, Caroline Rhea |
| September 21 | Regis Philbin & Kelly Ripa | Yes | Jason Lee, Claudia Cohen |
| September 22 | Regis Philbin & Kelly Ripa | No | LIVE's 2006 Relly Awards |
| September 25 | Regis Philbin & Kelly Ripa | Yes | Marcia Cross, Nelly Furtado |
| September 26 | Regis Philbin & Kelly Ripa | Yes | Ted Danson, Chris Noth, Ludacris |
| September 27 | Regis Philbin & Kelly Ripa | Yes | Billy Bob Thornton, Barney the purple dinosaur |
| September 28 | Regis Philbin & Kelly Ripa | Yes | John Stamos, Vanessa Hudgens, Marg Helgenberger |
| September 29 | Kelly Ripa & Jesse L. Martin | Yes | Nick Carter, Aaron Carter, Carrot Top |

=== October 2006 ===
| Date | Co-Hosts | "Host Chat" | Guests/Segments |
|---|---|---|---|
| October 2 | Regis Philbin & Kelly Ripa | Yes | Emily Procter, Lorenzo Borghese, Monica |
| October 3 | Regis Philbin & Kelly Ripa | Yes | Mark Wahlberg, Dominic Monaghan, Top of the Year awards |
| October 4 | Regis Philbin & Kelly Ripa | Yes | Kate Winslet, Alex Trebek |
| October 5 | Regis Philbin & Kelly Ripa | Yes | Jo Frost, Jerome Bettis, ophthalmologist Dr. Sandra Belmont |
| October 6 | Regis Philbin & Kelly Ripa | Yes | Amber Tamblyn, Emeril Lagasse |
| October 9 | Regis Philbin & Joy Philbin | Yes | Donald Trump, John Cena, James Blunt |
| October 10 | Regis Philbin & Kelly Ripa | Yes | Robin Williams, Robert Randolph and the Family Band |
| October 11 | Regis Philbin & Kelly Ripa | Yes | Dana Delany, Sarah Michelle Gellar |
| October 12 | Regis Philbin & Kelly Ripa | Yes | Christopher Walken, Forest Whitaker, Teddy Geiger |
| October 13 | Kelly Ripa & Sam Champion | Yes | Jane Krakowski, Frankie J |
| October 16 | Regis Philbin & Kelly Ripa | Yes | Ryan Phillippe |
| October 17 | Regis Philbin & Kelly Ripa | Yes | Kirsten Dunst, Ice-T |
| October 18 | Regis Philbin & Kelly Ripa | Yes | Tina Fey, JoJo |
| October 19 | Regis Philbin & Kelly Ripa | Yes | Hugh Jackman, Danity Kane, Regis plays tennis with an 86-year-old opponent |
| October 20 | Kelly Ripa & Tim Gunn | Yes | Michael Caine, Tim McGraw |
| October 23 | Regis Philbin & Kelly Ripa | Yes | Annette Bening, Peter Falk |
| October 24 | Regis Philbin & Kelly Ripa | Yes | Sharon Osbourne, Paula Deen, Miley Cyrus |
| October 25 | Regis Philbin & Kelly Ripa | Yes | Sarah Jessica Parker, last-minute Halloween costumes |
| October 26 | Regis Philbin & Kelly Ripa | Yes | James Belushi, The Wiggles |
| October 27 | Kelly Ripa & Mark Consuelos | Yes | Shannen Doherty, Molly Sims, Halloween party ideas |
| October 30 | Regis Philbin & Kelly Ripa | Yes | Adrian Pasdar, Nigella Lawson, Claudia Cohen |
| October 31 | Regis Philbin & Kelly Ripa | Yes | LIVE's Halloween Spectacular, Judy Sheindlin, Bowling for Soup |

=== November 2006 ===
| Date | Co-Hosts | "Host Chat" | Guests/Segments |
|---|---|---|---|
| November 1 | Regis Philbin & Kelly Ripa | Yes | Tim Allen, Jerry Springer |
| November 2 | Regis Philbin & Kelly Ripa | Yes | Denzel Washington, Jeff Gordon, Adewale Akinnuoye-Agbaje |
| November 3 | Regis Philbin & Kelly Ripa | Yes | Madonna, Chevy Chase, Gretchen Wilson |
| November 6 | Regis Philbin & Kelly Ripa | Yes | Sacha Baron Cohen, Sting |
| November 7 | Regis Philbin & Kelly Ripa | Yes | Russell Crowe |
| November 8 | Regis Philbin & Kelly Ripa | Yes | Will Ferrell, David James Elliott, a preview of Regis' appearance on "Jeopardy!" |
| November 9 | Regis Philbin & Kelly Ripa | Yes | Dustin Hoffman, John O'Hurley, Kelly takes a turn as a weather forecaster |
| November 10 | Regis Philbin & Kelly Ripa | Yes | Josh Groban, Howie Mandel, John Leguizamo |
| November 13 | Regis Philbin & Kelly Ripa | Yes | Julia Louis-Dreyfus, Christian Slater, Thanks-for-Giving Dream Team Ambush Makeover Week |
| November 14 | Regis Philbin & Kelly Ripa | Yes | Emilio Estevez, Terrell Owens, Thanks-for-Giving Dream Team Ambush Makeover Week |
| November 15 | Regis Philbin & Kelly Ripa | Yes | Penélope Cruz, Taye Diggs, Thanks-for-Giving Dream Team Ambush Makeover Week |
| November 16 | Regis Philbin & Kelly Ripa | Yes | Julianne Moore, Daniel Craig, Thanks-for-Giving Dream Team Ambush Makeover Week |
| November 17 | Kelly Ripa & Clay Aiken | Yes | Dancing with the Stars winners, Thanks-for-Giving Dream Team Ambush Makeover Week |
| November 20 | Regis Philbin & Kelly Ripa | Yes | Val Kilmer, Noah Wyle |
| November 21 | Regis Philbin & Kelly Ripa | Yes | Morgan Freeman, Rachel Weisz, crafts for kids |
| November 22 | Regis Philbin & Kelly Ripa | Yes | Kristin Davis, Chris Daughtry, Regis gets a flu shot |
| November 24 | Regis Philbin & Kelly Ripa | Yes | Wilmer Valderrama, Jimmie Johnson, Ricky Martin |
| November 27 | Regis Philbin & Kelly Ripa | Yes | Kyle Chandler, Lucy Liu |
| November 28 | Regis Philbin & Kelly Ripa | Yes | Jude Law, Prince Lorenzo Borghese |
| November 29 | Regis Philbin & Kelly Ripa | Yes | Dan Rather, Carson Kressley |
| November 30 | Regis Philbin & Kelly Ripa | Yes | Eva LaRue, Drake Bell |

=== December 2006 ===
| Date | Co-Hosts | "Host Chat" | Guests/Segments |
|---|---|---|---|
| December 4 | Regis Philbin & Kelly Ripa | Yes | Dakota Fanning, Derek Jeter, Sarah McLachlan |
| December 5 | Regis Philbin & Kelly Ripa | Yes | Cate Blanchett, Ciara |
| December 6 | Regis Philbin & Kelly Ripa | Yes | Shawn Wayans, Taylor Hicks |
| December 7 | Regis Philbin & Kelly Ripa | Yes | Rob Lowe, America's Next Top Model |
| December 8 | Kelly Ripa & Anderson Cooper | Yes | Jennifer Connelly, Kermit the Frog, Brian McKnight |
| December 11 | Regis Philbin & Kelly Ripa | Yes | Matthew Fox, Fantasia Barrino, winners of The Amazing Race |
| December 12 | Regis Philbin & Kelly Ripa | Yes | Matthew McConaughey, Trans-Siberian Orchestra |
| December 13 | Regis Philbin & Kelly Ripa | Yes | George Clooney, Susan Lucci |
| December 14 | Regis Philbin & Kelly Ripa | Yes | Naomi Watts, 50 Cent, Aimee Mann |
| December 15 | Regis Philbin & Kelly Ripa | Yes | Will Smith, Clay Aiken |
| December 18 | Regis Philbin & Kelly Ripa | Yes | Sylvester Stallone, Chris Brown & Bow Wow |
| December 19 | Regis Philbin & Kelly Ripa | Yes | Ben Stiller, Survivor: Cook Islands winner |
| December 20 | Regis Philbin & Kelly Ripa | Yes | Beyoncé Knowles, Cameron Mathison |
| December 21 | Regis Philbin & Kelly Ripa | Yes | Jamie Foxx, Clive Owen |
| December 22 | Regis Philbin & Kelly Ripa | Yes | LIVE's Holiday Celebration, Robert De Niro, Ashanti, Disney on Ice |

=== January 2007 ===
| Date | Co-Hosts | "Host Chat" | Guests/Segments |
|---|---|---|---|
| January 8 | Regis Philbin & Kelly Ripa | Yes | Donald Trump, Bill O'Reilly |
| January 9 | Regis Philbin & Kelly Ripa | Yes | Patricia Heaton, Corbin Bleu, Allen Carr |
| January 10 | Regis Philbin & Kelly Ripa | Yes | Renée Zellweger, Joan & Melissa Rivers, Andrew Weil |
| January 11 | Regis Philbin & Kelly Ripa | Yes | America Ferrera, Madonna, Dr. Robi Ludwig |
| January 12 | Regis Philbin & Kelly Ripa | Yes | Kiefer Sutherland, Jill Hennessy |
| January 15 | Regis Philbin & Kelly Ripa | Yes | Paula Abdul, Jimmy Fallon |
| January 16 | Regis Philbin & Kelly Ripa | Yes | Diana Ross, Rupert Everett, Jamie Oliver |
| January 17 | Regis Philbin & Kelly Ripa | Yes | Sophia Bush, Jerry Rice |
| January 18 | Regis Philbin & Kelly Ripa | Yes | Tony Danza, Tony Shalhoub, Todd English |
| January 19 | Kelly Ripa & Emeril Lagasse | Yes | Ali Larter |
| January 22 | Regis Philbin & Kelly Ripa | Yes | Carmen Electra, Robert Knepper |
| January 23 | Regis Philbin & Kelly Ripa | Yes | Jeremy Piven, Paul, Sr., Paul, Jr. & Michael Teutul |
| January 24 | Regis Philbin & Kelly Ripa | Yes | Jennifer Garner, Ryan Reynolds |
| January 25 | Regis Philbin & Kelly Ripa | Yes | Edward Norton |
| January 26 | Kelly Ripa & Mark Consuelos | Yes | Julianne Moore, Mandy Moore |
| January 29 | Regis Philbin & Kelly Ripa | Yes | Sheryl Crow |
| January 30 | Regis Philbin & Kelly Ripa | Yes | Brad Garrett, Guy Pearce |
| January 31 | Kelly Ripa & Pat Sajak | Yes | Dylan McDermott, Miss America 2007 |

=== February 2007 ===
| Date | Co-Hosts | "Host Chat" | Guests/Segments |
|---|---|---|---|
| February 1 | Regis Philbin & Kelly Ripa | Yes | Sienna Miller, Katharine McPhee |
| February 2 | Regis Philbin & Kelly Ripa | Yes | Jeff Probst, Charlize Theron |
| February 5 | Regis Philbin & Kelly Ripa | Yes | Chad Lowe |
| February 6 | Regis Philbin & Kelly Ripa | Yes | Phil McGraw, Alex Rodriguez |
| February 7 | Regis Philbin & Kelly Ripa | Yes | Ashley Tisdale |
| February 8 | Regis Philbin & Kelly Ripa | Yes | Tyler Perry, Carly Simon |
| February 9 | Regis Philbin & Kelly Ripa | No | LIVE's Wedding 2007 |
| February 12 | Regis Philbin & Kelly Ripa | Yes | Hugh Grant, Hayden Panettiere |
| February 13 | Regis Philbin & Kelly Ripa | Yes | Drew Barrymore, Ruth Westheimer |
| February 14 | Regis Philbin & Kelly Ripa | Yes | Nicolas Cage, Katherine Heigl, a hidden-camera report from a lingerie store, last-minute Valentine's Day gifts |
| February 15 | Regis Philbin & Kelly Ripa | Yes | Eva Mendes, Hi-5, Regis talks to youngsters about love |
| February 16 | Regis Philbin & Kelly Ripa | Yes | Martin Lawrence, Gabrielle Union, Daniel G. Amen |
| February 19 | Regis Philbin & Kelly Ripa | Yes | Marisa Tomei, bubble scientist Fan Yang, Beautiful Baby Week |
| February 20 | Regis Philbin & Kelly Ripa | Yes | Heather Graham, Daytona 500 winner, Beautiful Baby Week |
| February 21 | Regis Philbin & Kelly Ripa | Yes | William H. Macy, Beautiful Baby Week |
| February 22 | Regis Philbin & Kelly Ripa | Yes | John Travolta, Richard Roeper, Beautiful Baby Week |
| February 23 | Regis Philbin & Kelly Ripa | Yes | Billy Bob Thornton, Jesse L. Martin, Geraldo Rivera, Chris Byrne the Toy Guy, Beautiful Baby Week |
| February 26 | Regis Philbin & Kelly Ripa | Yes | LIVE! in Los Angeles, Tim Allen, Masi Oka, Joan & Melissa Rivers' Oscar recap |
| February 27 | Regis Philbin & Kelly Ripa | Yes | LIVE! in Los Angeles, Courteney Cox, David Boreanaz, Five for Fighting, Regis visits some of his favorite places in L.A. |
| February 28 | Regis Philbin & Kelly Ripa | Yes | LIVE! in Los Angeles, Emily Procter, Ryan Seacrest, Regis visits the set of Deal or No Deal |

=== March 2007 ===
| Date | Co-Hosts | "Host Chat" | Guests/Segments |
|---|---|---|---|
| March 1 | Regis Philbin & Kelly Ripa | Yes | LIVE! in Los Angeles, James Denton, Jewel, Kelly meets the cast of Dancing with the Stars |
| March 2 | Regis Philbin & Kelly Ripa | Yes | LIVE! in Los Angeles, Robert Downey Jr., Paula DeAnda, Anastasia the balloon-popping dog |
| March 5 | Regis Philbin & Kelly Ripa | Yes | Kelsey Grammer, Kyle MacLachlan |
| March 6 | Regis Philbin & Kelly Ripa | Yes | Liev Schreiber, Tracee Ellis Ross, animal expert Peter Gros |
| March 7 | Regis Philbin & Kelly Ripa | Yes | John Walsh, Oliver Hudson |
| March 8 | Regis Philbin & Kelly Ripa | Yes | Julia Louis-Dreyfus |
| March 9 | Kelly Ripa & Mark Consuelos | Yes | Mayumana perform excerpts from their off-Broadway show "Be". |
| March 12 | Regis Philbin & Kelly Ripa | Yes | James Belushi, Amazing Race castoffs |
| March 13 | Kelly Ripa & Anderson Cooper | Yes | Chris Rock, Robin Thicke |
| March 14 | Kelly Ripa & Anderson Cooper | Yes | Andy Richter, Mark Wahlberg |
| March 15 | Kelly Ripa & Damien Fahey | Yes | Sandra Bullock, Jeff Goldblum |
| March 16 | Kelly Ripa & Damien Fahey | Yes | Robin Miller |
| March 19 | Kelly Ripa & Howie Mandel | Yes | Christopher Meloni, Rainn Wilson, 12th American Idol Finalist |
| March 20 | Kelly Ripa & Howie Mandel | Yes | Kirk Douglas, Bernie Mac, Elliott Yamin |
| March 21 | Kelly Ripa & Howie Mandel | Yes | Adam Sandler, Terrence Howard, Bucky Covington |
| March 22 | Kelly Ripa & Neil Patrick Harris | Yes | Jada Pinkett Smith, Bridget Moynahan, Josh Gracin |
| March 23 | Kelly Ripa & Neil Patrick Harris | Yes | Liv Tyler, Poppy Montgomery, 11th American Idol Finalist |

=== April 2007 ===
| Date | Co-Hosts | "Host Chat" | Guests/Segments |
|---|---|---|---|
| April 9 | Kelly Ripa & Martin Short | Yes | Shia LaBeouf, 9th American Idol Finalist, New York Auto Show Week |
| April 10 | Kelly Ripa & Pat Sajak | Yes | Halle Berry, Robin Roberts, Zach Johnson, New York Auto Show Week |
| April 11 | Kelly Ripa & Pat Sajak | Yes | David Duchovny, Tina Fey, New York Auto Show Week |
| April 12 | Kelly Ripa & Pat Sajak | Yes | Edie Falco, New York Auto Show Week |
| April 13 | Kelly Ripa & Pat Sajak | Yes | Kevin Spacey, Andrew Zimmern, New York Auto Show Week |
| April 16 | Kelly Ripa & Mark Consuelos | Yes | Julie Andrews, 8th American Idol Finalist, Green Week |
| April 17 | Kelly Ripa & Jeff Probst | Yes | Sigourney Weaver, Mims, Green Week |
| April 18 | Kelly Ripa & Jeff Probst | Yes | Avril Lavigne, Diane Sawyer, Green Week |
| April 19 | Kelly Ripa & Jeff Probst | Yes | Jane Krakowski, Adam Brody, Green Week |
| April 20 | Kelly Ripa & Donald Trump | Yes | Garry Shandling, Taylor Hicks, Green Week |
| April 23 | Kelly Ripa & Bryant Gumbel | Yes | Julianne Moore, 7th American Idol Finalist |
| April 24 | Kelly Ripa & Bryant Gumbel | Yes | Julia Stiles, winner of The Apprentice |
| April 25 | Kelly Ripa & Bryant Gumbel | Yes | Russell Simmons, Carla Gugino |
| April 26 | Regis Philbin & Kelly Ripa | Yes | David Letterman |
| April 27 | Regis Philbin & Kelly Ripa | Yes | Steve Austin |
| April 30 | Regis Philbin & Kelly Ripa | Yes | Amanda Peet, Cardiologist Arthur Agatston |

=== May 2007 ===
| Date | Co-Hosts | "Host Chat" | Guests/Segments |
|---|---|---|---|
| May 1 | Regis Philbin & Kelly Ripa | Yes | Tobey Maguire, Carmen Electra, Ne-Yo |
| May 2 | Regis Philbin & Kelly Ripa | Yes | Kirsten Dunst, Mehmet Oz |
| May 3 | Regis Philbin & Kelly Ripa | Yes | Kate Walsh, Eric Bana |
| May 4 | Regis Philbin & Kelly Ripa | Yes | Tori Amos, Drew Barrymore, a CPR lesson |
| May 7 | Regis Philbin & Kelly Ripa | Yes | Zach Braff, Howie Mandel, 6th American Idol Finalist, 5th American Idol Finalist |
| May 8 | Regis Philbin & Kelly Ripa | Yes | Felicity Huffman, Amazing Race winners, Joy Philbin |
| May 9 | Regis Philbin & Kelly Ripa | Yes | Jane Fonda, Kelly Clarkson |
| May 10 | Regis Philbin & Kelly Ripa | Yes | Freddie Prinze, Jr., Larry the Cable Guy |
| May 11 | Regis Philbin & Kelly Ripa | No | LIVE's Mom's Dream Come True Special |
| May 14 | Regis Philbin & Kelly Ripa | Yes | Survivor: Fiji winner, 4th American Idol Finalist |
| May 15 | Regis Philbin & Kelly Ripa | Yes | Eric Dane, Milo Ventimiglia |
| May 16 | Regis Philbin & Kelly Ripa | Yes | Don Rickles, Rebecca Romijn |
| May 17 | Regis Philbin & Kelly Ripa | Yes | America Ferrera, Mike Myers |
| May 18 | Regis Philbin & Kelly Ripa | Yes | Nicollette Sheridan, Tom Selleck, Jimmy Kimmel |
| May 21 | Regis Philbin & Kelly Ripa | Yes | Evangeline Lilly, Sendhil Ramamurthy, Gretchen Wilson |
| May 22 | Regis Philbin & Kelly Ripa | Yes | LIVE! in New Orleans, Emeril Lagasse, Pete Fountain, Kyle Busch |
| May 23 | Regis Philbin & Kelly Ripa | Yes | LIVE! in New Orleans, John Stamos, Tenney Flynn, Preservation Hall Jazz Band |
| May 24 | Regis Philbin & Kelly Ripa | Yes | LIVE! in New Orleans, Martina McBride, America's Next Top Model, Paul Prudhomme, Dirty Dozen Brass Band |
| May 25 | Regis Philbin & Kelly Ripa | Yes | LIVE! in New Orleans, Luke Wilson, Cowboy Mouth, Leah Chase, Rockin' Dopsie |
| May 28 | Regis Philbin & Kelly Ripa | Yes | Joey Lawrence, Brenda Song, Swimwear |
| May 29 | Regis Philbin & Kelly Ripa | Yes | Kevin Costner, American Idol winner, Indianapolis 500 winner |
| May 30 | Regis Philbin & Kelly Ripa | Yes | Charles Gibson, American Idol runner-up, the winner of the MathCounts competition for middle-school students |
| May 31 | Regis Philbin & Kelly Ripa | Yes | Elisabeth Shue, American Idol third-place finisher, animal expert Peter Gros |

=== June 2007 ===
| Date | Co-Hosts | "Host Chat" | Guests/Segments |
|---|---|---|---|
| June 1 | Regis Philbin & Kelly Ripa | Yes | Fantasia Barrino, Becki Newton |
| June 4 | Kelly Ripa & Bryant Gumbel | Yes | Tyler Perry, Miss Universe 2007, Broadway Week |
| June 5 | Kelly Ripa & Bryant Gumbel | Yes | Marg Helgenberger, Jerry Springer, Broadway Week |
| June 6 | Kelly Ripa & Ted McGinley | Yes | Jessica Alba, Bindi Irwin, Broadway Week |
| June 7 | Kelly Ripa & Neil Patrick Harris | Yes | Jimmie Johnson, Broadway Week |
| June 8 | Kelly Ripa & Neil Patrick Harris | Yes | Nicole Richie, Broadway Week, Grill Friday |
| June 11 | Regis Philbin & Mario Lopez | Yes | Bill Paxton, Matt Dallas, Top Dog Week |
| June 12 | Regis Philbin & Kelly Ripa | Yes | Kevin Connolly, Vanessa L. Williams, Top Dog Week |
| June 13 | Regis Philbin & Kelly Ripa | Yes | Kyra Sedgwick, Emma Roberts, Top Dog Week |
| June 14 | Regis Philbin & Kelly Ripa | Yes | Michael Chiklis, Joan Rivers, Top Dog Week |
| June 15 | Regis Philbin & Kelly Ripa | Yes | Jeremy Piven, Joss Stone, Top Dog Week, Grill Friday |
| June 18 | Kelly Ripa & Mark Consuelos | Yes | Enrique Iglesias, Tyrese Gibson |
| June 19 | Regis Philbin & Kelly Ripa | Yes | Steve Carell, Mandy Moore |
| June 20 | Regis Philbin & Kelly Ripa | Yes | John Cusack, Jeanne Tripplehorn, DJ JS-1 |
| June 21 | Regis Philbin & Kelly Ripa | Yes | Elisha Cuthbert, Lisa Rinna & Harry Hamlin, Drake Bell |
| June 22 | Regis Philbin & Kelly Ripa | Yes | Téa Leoni, John Krasinski, Grill Friday |

=== July 2007 ===
| Date | Co-Hosts | "Host Chat" | Guests/Segments |
|---|---|---|---|
| July 2 | Regis Philbin & Kelly Ripa | Yes | Claire Danes, Jerry Mathers, Shaquille O'Neal |
| July 3 | Regis Philbin & Kelly Ripa | Yes | Josh Duhamel, Anneliese van der Pol |
| July 4 | Regis Philbin & Kelly Ripa | Yes | Aly and AJ, Petra Němcová, Jim Cramer |
| July 5 | Regis Philbin & Kelly Ripa | Yes | Kevin Dillon, Connie Britton, Lloyd |
| July 6 | Regis Philbin & Kelly Ripa | Yes | Miley Cyrus, Pamela Anderson & Hans Klok, DJ JS-1, Grill Friday |
| July 9 | Regis Philbin & Kelly Ripa | Yes | Jason Priestley, Alan Cumming, Jeff Gordon, Kat DeLuna |
| July 10 | Regis Philbin & Kelly Ripa | Yes | Don Cheadle, Bernadette Peters, James Blake |
| July 11 | Regis Philbin & Kelly Ripa | Yes | Daniel Radcliffe, Sienna Miller, T-Pain |
| July 12 | Regis Philbin & Kelly Ripa | Yes | Emma Watson, Finola Hughes, Maroon 5 |
| July 13 | Regis Philbin & Kelly Ripa | Yes | Abigail Breslin, Joey Fatone, Grill Friday |
| July 16 | Regis Philbin & Kelly Ripa | Yes | Queen Latifah, Blair Underwood, Family Fitness Week |
| July 17 | Regis Philbin & Kelly Ripa | Yes | John Travolta, Family Fitness Week |
| July 18 | Regis Philbin & Kelly Ripa | Yes | Adam Sandler, Zac Efron, Family Fitness Week |
| July 19 | Regis Philbin & Kelly Ripa | Yes | Jessica Biel, Hi-5, Family Fitness Week |
| July 20 | Regis Philbin & Kelly Ripa | Yes | Kevin James, Family Fitness Week, Grill Friday |
| July 23 | Regis Philbin & Kelly Ripa | Yes | Scott Baio, Lifehouse |
| July 24 | Regis Philbin & Kelly Ripa | Yes | Christopher Walken, Kellie Pickler, Jennifer Hudson |
| July 25 | Regis Philbin & Kelly Ripa | Yes | Katharine McPhee, Aaron Eckhart |
| July 26 | Regis Philbin & Kelly Ripa | Yes | Jennifer Lopez, Nikki Blonsky |
| July 27 | Regis Philbin & Kelly Ripa | Yes | Catherine Zeta-Jones, Paul Rudd, Grill Friday |
| July 30 | Regis Philbin & Kelly Ripa | Yes | James Belushi, Michael Bublé, Sharon Osbourne |
| July 31 | Regis Philbin & Kelly Ripa | Yes | John Leguizamo, Catherine Bell, Rev. Joseph Orsini |

=== August 2007 ===
| Date | Co-Hosts | "Host Chat" | Guests/Segments |
|---|---|---|---|
| August 1 | Regis Philbin & Kelly Ripa | Yes | Anne Hathaway, Seth Rogen, Plain White T's |
| August 2 | Regis Philbin & Kelly Ripa | Yes | Chris O'Donnell, Clint Black, Ashley Tisdale |
| August 3 | Regis Philbin & Kelly Ripa | Yes | Jackie Chan, Andy Samberg, Grill Friday |
| August 6 | Kelly Ripa & Carson Kressley | Yes | Chris Tucker, Steve Buscemi, Guinness World Record Breaker Week |
| August 7 | Regis Philbin & Kelly Ripa | Yes | Tori Spelling, Drew Carey, Guinness World Record Breaker Week |
| August 8 | Regis Philbin & Kelly Ripa | Yes | Michelle Pfeiffer, Guinness World Record Breaker Week |
| August 9 | Regis Philbin & Kelly Ripa | Yes | Cuba Gooding, Jr., Guinness World Record Breaker Week |
| August 10 | Regis Philbin & Kelly Ripa | Yes | Lance Bass, Guinness World Record Breaker Week, Grill Friday |
| August 13 | Kelly Ripa & Enrique Iglesias | Yes | Lauren Conrad, Nick Cannon |
| August 14 | Regis Philbin & Kelly Ripa | Yes | Tony Shalhoub, Brad Paisley, Laura Linney |
| August 15 | Regis Philbin & Kelly Ripa | Yes | Aisha Tyler, Def Leppard |
| August 16 | Regis Philbin & Joy Philbin | Yes | Vanessa Hudgens, Denis Leary, Good Charlotte |
| August 17 | Regis Philbin & Joy Philbin | Yes | Star Jones, Grill Friday |

== Season 20 (2007–2008) ==
=== September 2007 ===
| Date | Co-Hosts | "Host Chat" | Guests/Segments |
|---|---|---|---|
| September 3 | Regis Philbin & Kelly Ripa | Yes | Glenn Close, Dylan and Cole Sprouse and a segment on the series' history |
| September 4 | Regis Philbin & Kelly Ripa | Yes | Daniel Radcliffe, Jerome Bettis, a montage of comical moments over the years |
| September 5 | Regis Philbin & Kelly Ripa | Yes | David Duchovny, Jimmie Johnson, a segment on Regis' health |
| September 6 | Regis Philbin & Kelly Ripa | Yes | Alan Alda, Teri Hatcher, places the show has visited over the years |
| September 7 | Regis Philbin & Kelly Ripa | Yes | Richard Gere, Avril Lavigne, a segment on past dance trends |
| September 10 | Regis Philbin & Kelly Ripa | Yes | Michael Douglas, Terrence Howard, Roger Federer, a look at executive producer Michael Gelman's contributions to the show over the years |
| September 11 | Regis Philbin & Kelly Ripa | Yes | Jodie Foster, Lyle Lovett, a look at daring feats attempted on the show over the years |
| September 12 | Regis Philbin & Kelly Ripa | Yes | Billy Bob Thornton, Fall Out Boy, a look at Art Moore through the years |
| September 13 | Regis Philbin & Kelly Ripa | Yes | Patricia Heaton, Chris Daughtry, memorable host chats over the years |
| September 14 | Regis Philbin & Kelly Ripa | No | LIVE's 20th Anniversary, Kathie Lee Gifford |
| September 17 | Regis Philbin & Kelly Ripa | Yes | Morgan Freeman, Ashanti, Diana Krall |
| September 18 | Regis Philbin & Kelly Ripa | Yes | Kelsey Grammer, Brad Garrett, KT Tunstall |
| September 19 | Regis Philbin & Kelly Ripa | Yes | Jessica Alba, Jeff Probst, Kenneth Edmonds |
| September 20 | Regis Philbin & Kelly Ripa | Yes | Courtney Thorne-Smith, John Edward, Rusty Wallace |
| September 21 | Regis Philbin & Kelly Ripa | No | LIVE's 2007 Relly Awards |
| September 24 | Regis Philbin & Kelly Ripa | Yes | Hayden Panettiere, Judy Sheindlin |
| September 25 | Regis Philbin & Kelly Ripa | Yes | Jamie Foxx, Peter Krause |
| September 26 | Regis Philbin & Kelly Ripa | Yes | Dwayne Johnson, Queen Latifah, Carrot Top |
| September 27 | Regis Philbin & Kelly Ripa | Yes | Tony Bennett, Jennifer Garner, Diane Sawyer |
| September 28 | Kelly Ripa & Pat Sajak | Yes | Sally Field, Molly Sims, Melissa Etheridge |

=== October 2007 ===
| Date | Co-Hosts | "Host Chat" | Guests/Segments |
|---|---|---|---|
| October 1 | Regis Philbin & Kelly Ripa | Yes | Adrien Brody, Christopher Meloni, animal expert Jarod Miller |
| October 2 | Regis Philbin & Kelly Ripa | Yes | Alyssa Milano, Jerry O'Connell, a recipe by The Love Chef |
| October 3 | Regis Philbin & Kelly Ripa | Yes | Ted Danson, Ted Koppel |
| October 4 | Regis Philbin & Kelly Ripa | Yes | Tina Fey, Jude Law |
| October 5 | Kelly Ripa & Sam Champion | Yes | Kyra Sedgwick, Brooks & Dunn |
| October 8 | Regis Philbin & Kelly Ripa | Yes | Cate Blanchett, NASCAR drivers Jeff Gordon, Denny Hamlin, Kevin Harvick, Jimmie Johnson and Matt Kenseth |
| October 9 | Regis Philbin & Kelly Ripa | Yes | Faith Ford, Mark Wahlberg, Vanessa Carlton |
| October 10 | Regis Philbin & Kelly Ripa | Yes | Tyler Perry, Joaquin Phoenix, Taylor Swift |
| October 11 | Regis Philbin & Kelly Ripa | Yes | Josh Hartnett, Cameron Mathison, Jill Scott |
| October 12 | Kelly Ripa & Jeff Probst | Yes | Janet Jackson, Eva Mendes |
| October 15 | Regis Philbin & Kelly Ripa | Yes | Christina Applegate, Jessica Seinfeld, CFA-Iams Cat Championship |
| October 16 | Regis Philbin & Kelly Ripa | Yes | Jake Gyllenhaal, Dominic Purcell |
| October 17 | Regis Philbin & Kelly Ripa | Yes | Anthony Hopkins, Casey Affleck |
| October 18 | Regis Philbin & Kelly Ripa | Yes | Ben Affleck, Rebecca Romijn, LeAnn Rimes |
| October 19 | Kelly Ripa & Mark Consuelos | Yes | Denzel Washington, interior designer Vern Yip |
| October 22 | Kelly Ripa & Jimmy Kimmel | Yes | Ashley Tisdale, Vanna White, Adrian Pasdar |
| October 23 | Kelly Ripa & Jimmy Kimmel | Yes | Halle Berry, Anderson Cooper |
| October 24 | Kelly Ripa & Jimmy Kimmel | Yes | Blake Lively, Steve Carell, Carrie Underwood |
| October 25 | Kelly Ripa & Jimmy Kimmel | Yes | Renée Zellweger, Barenaked Ladies |
| October 26 | Kelly Ripa & Jimmy Kimmel | Yes | Kevin Bacon, Brian McKnight, Halloween treats |
| October 29 | Regis Philbin & Kelly Ripa | Yes | Ethan Hawke, Bill O'Reilly, Halloween masks |
| October 30 | Regis Philbin & Kelly Ripa | Yes | William Baldwin, John O'Hurley |
| October 31 | Regis Philbin & Kelly Ripa | Yes | LIVE's 3D Halloween Spectacular, Phil McGraw, Backstreet Boys |

=== November 2007 ===
| Date | Co-Hosts | "Host Chat" | Guests/Segments |
|---|---|---|---|
| November 1 | Regis Philbin & Kelly Ripa | Yes | Jerry Seinfeld, Amanda Peet |
| November 2 | Regis Philbin & Kelly Ripa | Yes | Marisa Tomei, Baby Bash, Damien Fahey |
| November 5 | Regis Philbin & Kelly Ripa | Yes | Taye Diggs, James Pickens, Jr., chef Nigella Lawson |
| November 6 | Regis Philbin & Kelly Ripa | Yes | Portia de Rossi, Dylan McDermott, Regis gets a flu shot |
| November 7 | Regis Philbin & Kelly Ripa | Yes | Eric Dane, Tom Brokaw, Seal |
| November 8 | Regis Philbin & Kelly Ripa | Yes | John Stamos, Vince Vaughn |
| November 9 | Regis Philbin & Kelly Ripa | Yes | Jonathan Rhys Meyers, Paul Giamatti |
| November 12 | Regis Philbin & Kelly Ripa | Yes | David Boreanaz, Heidi Klum, Thanksgiving Recipe Week |
| November 13 | Regis Philbin & Kelly Ripa | Yes | Dustin Hoffman, Thanksgiving Recipe Week |
| November 14 | Regis Philbin & Kelly Ripa | Yes | Benjamin Bratt, Alicia Keys, Thanksgiving Recipe Week |
| November 15 | Regis Philbin & Kelly Ripa | Yes | Natalie Portman, Boyz II Men, Thanksgiving Recipe Week |
| November 16 | Regis Philbin & Kelly Ripa | Yes | Richard Gere, Michael C. Hall, David Duchovny, Thanksgiving Recipe Week |
| November 19 | Regis Philbin & Kelly Ripa | Yes | Dana Delany, Neil Patrick Harris |
| November 20 | Regis Philbin & Kelly Ripa | Yes | Patrick Dempsey |
| November 21 | Regis Philbin & Kelly Ripa | Yes | Donald Trump, Jordin Sparks |
| November 23 | Regis Philbin & Kelly Ripa | Yes | Nicole Kidman, James Blunt |
| November 26 | Regis Philbin & Kelly Ripa | Yes | Jessica Alba, Jimmie Johnson, Menudo |
| November 27 | Regis Philbin & Kelly Ripa | Yes | LIVE! in The Bahamas, Tim Gunn, Jonas Brothers, Project Runway: Bahamas Edition |
| November 28 | Regis Philbin & Kelly Ripa | Yes | LIVE! in The Bahamas, Kellie Pickler, Regis tests his tennis skills with Venus Williams as they take on Gelman and the world's #3 ranked Doubles player, Mark Knowles |
| November 29 | Regis Philbin & Kelly Ripa | Yes | LIVE! in The Bahamas, Kyle MacLachlan, Sean Kingston, Kelly and her son Michael swim with the dolphins and visit the Aquarium's animal hospital |
| November 30 | Regis Philbin & Kelly Ripa | Yes | LIVE! in The Bahamas, Jane Krakowski, Billy Ray Cyrus, Regis spends some quality time in the Bahamas with the children of Live, Jonny P transforms a group of audience members into smokin' hot dancers |

=== December 2007 ===
| Date | Co-Hosts | "Host Chat" | Guests/Segments |
|---|---|---|---|
| December 3 | Regis Philbin & Kelly Ripa | Yes | Keira Knightley, Masi Oka, High-Tech Gift Week |
| December 4 | Regis Philbin & Kelly Ripa | Yes | Mario Lopez, Ben Affleck, High-Tech Gift Week |
| December 5 | Regis Philbin & Kelly Ripa | Yes | Jennifer Jason Leigh, Laura Linney, High-Tech Gift Week |
| December 6 | Regis Philbin & Kelly Ripa | Yes | Megan Mullally, Rob Morrow, High-Tech Gift Week |
| December 7 | Kelly Ripa & Ted McGinley | Yes | Holly Hunter, Blake Lewis, High-Tech Gift Week |
| December 10 | Regis Philbin & Kelly Ripa | Yes | Jason Lee, Jim Cramer, Josh Groban |
| December 11 | Regis Philbin & Kelly Ripa | Yes | Jon Voight, Lucas Grabeel, Mannheim Steamroller |
| December 12 | Regis Philbin & Kelly Ripa | Yes | Will Smith, Rick Springfield |
| December 13 | Regis Philbin & Kelly Ripa | Yes | Hilary Swank, America's Next Top Model, Darlene Love |
| December 14 | Kelly Ripa & Anderson Cooper | Yes | Nicolas Cage, Michael Bolton |
| December 17 | Regis Philbin & Kelly Ripa | Yes | Nick Lachey, winner of Survivor: China, Holiday Survival Week |
| December 18 | Regis Philbin & Kelly Ripa | Yes | Helen Mirren, Jenna Fischer, Holiday Survival Week |
| December 19 | Regis Philbin & Kelly Ripa | Yes | Tom Hanks, Holiday Survival Week |
| December 20 | Regis Philbin & Kelly Ripa | Yes | John C. Reilly, Emile Hirsch, Holiday Survival Week |
| December 21 | Regis Philbin & Kelly Ripa | Yes | Denzel Washington, Charles Grodin, Holiday Survival Week |
| December 24 | Regis Philbin & Kelly Ripa | Yes | LIVE's Holiday Celebration, Brad Pitt, Disney On Ice |

=== January 2008 ===
| Date | Co-Hosts | "Host Chat" | Guests/Segments |
|---|---|---|---|
| January 7 | Kelly Ripa & Pat Sajak | Yes | Carson Kressley, Hulk Hogan, Staff Fitness Challenge Week |
| January 8 | Kelly Ripa & Pat Sajak | Yes | Lisa Rinna, Chace Crawford, Staff Fitness Challenge Week |
| January 9 | Kelly Ripa & Mark Consuelos | Yes | Ice Cube, Kirk Franklin, Staff Fitness Challenge Week |
| January 10 | Kelly Ripa & Howie Mandel | Yes | Donald Trump, James Marsden, Staff Fitness Challenge Week |
| January 11 | Kelly Ripa & Howie Mandel | Yes | Edward Burns, Drew Lachey, Staff Fitness Challenge Week |
| January 14 | Regis Philbin & Kelly Ripa | Yes | Katie Holmes, Dylan Walsh, Finger Eleven |
| January 15 | Regis Philbin & Kelly Ripa | Yes | Hank Azaria, KT Tunstall |
| January 16 | Regis Philbin & Kelly Ripa | Yes | Ted Danson, Catherine Bell, Soulja Boy Tell 'Em |
| January 17 | Regis Philbin & Kelly Ripa | Yes | Queen Latifah, Katherine Heigl |
| January 18 | Kelly Ripa & Jeff Gordon | Yes | Mario Lopez, Michael Urie |
| January 21 | Regis Philbin & Kelly Ripa | Yes | Lucy Liu, Sophia Bush, Natasha Bedingfield |
| January 22 | Regis Philbin & Kelly Ripa | Yes | Michael Kors, The Amazing Race winners |
| January 23 | Regis Philbin & Kelly Ripa | Yes | Sarah Michelle Gellar, Bret Michaels |
| January 24 | Regis Philbin & Joy Philbin | Yes | Diane Lane, Nathan Lane, Lisa Rinna |
| January 28 | Regis Philbin & Kelly Ripa | Yes | Miss America 2008, Sara Bareilles, Healthy Hearty Football Party Week |
| January 29 | Regis Philbin & Kelly Ripa | Yes | Carmen Electra, Jessica Alba, Healthy Hearty Football Party Week |
| January 30 | Regis Philbin & Kelly Ripa | Yes | Susan Lucci, Julia Louis-Dreyfus, Healthy Hearty Football Party Week |
| January 31 | Regis Philbin & Kelly Ripa | Yes | Eva Longoria, Charles Gibson, Healthy Hearty Football Party Week |

=== February 2008 ===
| Date | Co-Hosts | "Host Chat" | Guests/Segments |
|---|---|---|---|
| February 1 | Regis Philbin & Kelly Ripa | Yes | Jeffrey Tambor, Jeff Probst, Healthy Hearty Football Party Week |
| February 4 | Regis Philbin & Kelly Ripa | Yes | Martin Lawrence, Wedding Week |
| February 5 | Regis Philbin & Kelly Ripa | Yes | Matthew McConaughey, Bow Wow & Omarion, Wedding Week |
| February 6 | Regis Philbin & Kelly Ripa | Yes | Kate Hudson, k.d. lang, Michael Strahan, Wedding Week |
| February 7 | Regis Philbin & Kelly Ripa | Yes | Vince Vaughn, Brooke Shields, Lenny Kravitz, Wedding Week |
| February 8 | Regis Philbin & Kelly Ripa | No | LIVE's Wedding 2008 |
| February 11 | Regis Philbin & Kelly Ripa | Yes | Rachel Bilson, Enrique Iglesias, Beautiful Baby Week |
| February 12 | Regis Philbin & Kelly Ripa | Yes | Samuel L. Jackson, Maroon 5, Beautiful Baby Week |
| February 13 | Regis Philbin & Kelly Ripa | Yes | Colin Farrell, Evangeline Lilly, Beautiful Baby Week |
| February 14 | Regis Philbin & Kelly Ripa | Yes | Hayden Christensen, Isla Fisher, Beautiful Baby Week |
| February 15 | Regis Philbin & Kelly Ripa | Yes | Ryan Reynolds, Ingrid Michaelson, Neil Patrick Harris, Beautiful Baby Week |
| February 18 | Regis Philbin & Kelly Ripa | Yes | Lauren Conrad, John Larroquette, Salt-n-Pepa |
| February 19 | Regis Philbin & Kelly Ripa | Yes | Matthew Fox, Larry the Cable Guy, Daytona 500 winner |
| February 20 | Regis Philbin & Kelly Ripa | Yes | Dennis Quaid, four finalists of Project Runway |
| February 21 | Regis Philbin & Kelly Ripa | Yes | Forest Whitaker, Ian Ziering |
| February 22 | Regis Philbin & Kelly Ripa | Yes | Scarlett Johansson, Richard Roeper, Chris Byrne the Toy Guy |
| February 25 | Regis Philbin & Kelly Ripa | Yes | LIVE! in Los Angeles, Sean Combs, Scott Baio, Regis at the Academy Awards |
| February 26 | Regis Philbin & Kelly Ripa | Yes | LIVE! in Los Angeles, Patricia Heaton, Scott Baio, Kelly visits the set of American Idol |
| February 27 | Regis Philbin & Kelly Ripa | Yes | LIVE! in Los Angeles, Reese Witherspoon, Simon Cowell, Anastasia the balloon-popping dog |
| February 28 | Regis Philbin & Kelly Ripa | Yes | LIVE! in Los Angeles, Drew Carey, Raven-Symoné, Regis tours exclusive L.A. neighborhoods Regis keeps calling Drew "Bob" and admits that Joy could win THE CLOCK GAME because she is the fastest woman in the bedroom if you know what I mean. Kelly can name all of the Pricing games in one minute alphabetically. |
| February 29 | Regis Philbin & Kelly Ripa | Yes | LIVE! in Los Angeles, Courteney Cox, Josh Kelley, L.A. workout at Point Mugu |

=== March 2008 ===
| Date | Co-Hosts | "Host Chat" | Guests/Segments |
|---|---|---|---|
| March 3 | Regis Philbin & Kelly Ripa | Yes | David Hyde Pierce, Jason Statham |
| March 4 | Regis Philbin & Kelly Ripa | Yes | Amy Adams, Ivanka Trump, Michael McDonald |
| March 5 | Regis Philbin & Kelly Ripa | Yes | Lindsay Price, Steve Carell |
| March 6 | Regis Philbin & Kelly Ripa | Yes | Tom Colicchio, winner of Project Runway |
| March 7 | Kelly Ripa & Bryant Gumbel | Yes | Paul Giamatti, Julianna Margulies |
| March 10 | Regis Philbin & Kelly Ripa | Yes | Jim Carrey, animal expert Peter Gros |
| March 11 | Regis Philbin & Kelly Ripa | Yes | Alyssa Milano, Skeet Ulrich, John Howe of the U.S. Pizza Team |
| March 12 | Regis Philbin & Kelly Ripa | Yes | Kate Beckinsale, Parker Posey |
| March 13 | Kelly Ripa & Anderson Cooper | Yes | Cheryl Hines, Charlize Theron, Cowboy Mouth |
| March 24 | Regis Philbin & Joy Philbin | Yes | Emily Procter, 11th American Idol Finalist, New York Auto Show Week |
| March 25 | Regis Philbin & Joy Philbin | Yes | Demi Moore, New York Auto Show Week |
| March 26 | Regis Philbin & Megan Mullally | Yes | Kate Bosworth, Tom Cavanagh, New York Auto Show Week |
| March 27 | Regis Philbin & Bernadette Peters | Yes | Four couples from Dancing with the Stars, Celebrity Apprentice finalists, New York Auto Show Week |
| March 31 | Regis Philbin & Kelly Ripa | Yes | 10th American Idol Finalist, winners of Randy Jackson Presents America's Best Dance Crew, Staff Fitness Challenge Week |

=== April 2008 ===
| Date | Co-Hosts | "Host Chat" | Guests/Segments |
|---|---|---|---|
| April 1 | Regis Philbin & Kelly Ripa | Yes | Julie Andrews, Lifehouse, Staff Fitness Challenge Week |
| April 2 | Regis Philbin & Kelly Ripa | Yes | Jodie Foster, Avril Lavigne, Staff Fitness Challenge Week |
| April 3 | Regis Philbin & Joy Philbin | Yes | George Clooney, Mario, Staff Fitness Challenge Week |
| April 4 | Kelly Ripa & Anderson Cooper | Yes | Renée Zellweger, Staff Fitness Challenge Week |
| April 7 | Regis Philbin & Kelly Ripa | Yes | Brittany Snow, 9th American Idol Finalist, Green Week |
| April 8 | Regis Philbin & Kelly Ripa | Yes | Leona Lewis, Diane Sawyer, Green Week |
| April 9 | Kelly Ripa & Pat Sajak | Yes | Keanu Reeves, Green Week |
| April 10 | Kelly Ripa & Pat Sajak | Yes | Josh Radnor, Green Week |
| April 11 | Kelly Ripa & Bryant Gumbel | Yes | David Boreanaz, Green Week, Keyshia Cole |
| April 14 | Regis Philbin & Kelly Ripa | Yes | Laurence Fishburne, 8th American Idol Finalist, Miss USA 2008 |
| April 15 | Regis Philbin & Kelly Ripa | Yes | Milo Ventimiglia, Trevor Immelman |
| April 16 | Regis Philbin & Kelly Ripa | Yes | Kristen Bell, Heidi Montag |
| April 17 | Regis Philbin & Kelly Ripa | Yes | Fergie, Dancing with the Stars castoffs |
| April 18 | Kelly Ripa & Kyle MacLachlan | Yes | Willem Dafoe, Katie Lee Joel, Prom dresses |
| April 21 | Regis Philbin & Kelly Ripa | Yes | Neil Patrick Harris, 7th American Idol Finalist, 10-year-old chess master Nicholas Nip |
| April 22 | Regis Philbin & Kelly Ripa | Yes | Colin Firth, Amy Poehler, Kat DeLuna |
| April 23 | Regis Philbin & Kelly Ripa | Yes | Helen Hunt, Eric Mabius |
| April 24 | Regis Philbin & Kelly Ripa | Yes | Sigourney Weaver, Dancing with the Stars castoffs |
| April 25 | Regis Philbin & Kelly Ripa | Yes | Chris Meloni, John Walsh, Mariah Carey |
| April 28 | Regis Philbin & Kelly Ripa | Yes | Robert Downey Jr., Hilary Duff, 6th American Idol Finalist |
| April 29 | Regis Philbin & Kelly Ripa | Yes | Patrick Dempsey, Terrence Howard, Lil Mama |
| April 30 | Regis Philbin & Kelly Ripa | Yes | Gwyneth Paltrow, Gordon Ramsay, Taylor Swift |

=== May 2008 ===
| Date | Co-Hosts | "Host Chat" | Guests/Segments |
|---|---|---|---|
| May 1 | Regis Philbin & Kelly Ripa | Yes | Matthew Broderick, Evan Handler, Dancing with the Stars castoffs |
| May 2 | Regis Philbin & Kelly Ripa | Yes | Carly Simon, Jeff Probst, Penn Badgley |
| May 5 | Regis Philbin & Kelly Ripa | Yes | John Goodman, 5th American Idol Finalist |
| May 6 | Regis Philbin & Kelly Ripa | Yes | John Walsh, Gavin DeGraw, Melina Kanakaredes |
| May 7 | Regis Philbin & Kelly Ripa | Yes | Ashton Kutcher, Barenaked Ladies |
| May 8 | Regis Philbin & Kelly Ripa | Yes | Liam Neeson, Emile Hirsch, Dancing with the Stars castoffs |
| May 9 | Regis Philbin & Kelly Ripa | No | LIVE's Mom's Dream Come True Special |
| May 12 | Regis Philbin & Kelly Ripa | Yes | Eric Dane, Survivor: Micronesia winner, 4th American Idol Finalist |
| May 13 | Regis Philbin & Kelly Ripa | Yes | Jimmy Buffett, Mario Lopez, Duffy |
| May 14 | Regis Philbin & Kelly Ripa | Yes | John McCain, Paulie Litt |
| May 15 | Regis Philbin & Kelly Ripa | Yes | Montel Williams, America's Next Top Model, Dancing with the Stars castoffs |
| May 16 | Regis Philbin & Kelly Ripa | Yes | Alyson Hannigan, Bryan Adams, the winner of the MathCounts competition for middle-school students Darryl Wu |
| May 19 | Regis Philbin & Kelly Ripa | Yes | Jonathan Rhys Meyers, Natasha Bedingfield, Only in New York Week |
| May 20 | Regis Philbin & Kelly Ripa | Yes | Shia LaBeouf, Sara Bareilles, Only in New York Week |
| May 21 | Regis Philbin & Kelly Ripa | Yes | Kevin Spacey, second and third-place couples on Dancing with the Stars, Only in New York Week |
| May 22 | Regis Philbin & Kelly Ripa | Yes | Harrison Ford, winners of Dancing with the Stars, Only in New York Week |
| May 23 | Kelly Ripa & Neil Patrick Harris | Yes | Jesse McCartney, Alan Alda, Only in New York Week |
| May 26 | Regis Philbin & Kelly Ripa | Yes | Dustin Hoffman, Audrina Patridge, Augustana |
| May 27 | Regis Philbin & Kelly Ripa | Yes | Kim Cattrall, American Idol winner |
| May 28 | Regis Philbin & Kelly Ripa | Yes | Kristin Davis, American Idol runner-up, Indianapolis 500 winner |
| May 29 | Regis Philbin & Kelly Ripa | Yes | Sarah Jessica Parker, American Idol third-place finisher, Gardening Tips |
| May 30 | Kelly Ripa & Pat Sajak | Yes | Cynthia Nixon |

=== June 2008 ===
| Date | Co-Hosts | "Host Chat" | Guests/Segments |
|---|---|---|---|
| June 2 | Kelly Ripa & Jeff Probst | Yes | Catherine Bell, John Leguizamo, Cirque Dreams Jungle Fantasy |
| June 3 | Regis Philbin & Kelly Ripa | Yes | Seann William Scott, Scripps Spelling Bee, The B-52s |
| June 4 | Regis Philbin & Kelly Ripa | Yes | Julianne Moore, Jewel, Memory Expert Brad Williams |
| June 5 | Regis Philbin & Kelly Ripa | Yes | Adam Sandler, Mehmet Oz |
| June 6 | Regis Philbin & Kelly Ripa | Yes | Jack Black, Grilling with the Stars |
| June 9 | Kelly Ripa & Mario Lopez | Yes | S. Epatha Merkerson, Broadway Week |
| June 10 | Regis Philbin & Kelly Ripa | Yes | Marisa Tomei, Cat Deeley, Broadway Week |
| June 11 | Regis Philbin & Kelly Ripa | Yes | Michael Strahan, Broadway Week |
| June 12 | Regis Philbin & Kelly Ripa | Yes | Jonas Brothers, Broadway Week |
| June 13 | Regis Philbin & Kelly Ripa | Yes | Liv Tyler, Broadway Week, Grilling with the Stars |
| June 16 | Kelly Ripa & Emeril Lagasse | Yes | Jordin Sparks, Brittany Snow |
| June 17 | Regis Philbin & Kelly Ripa | Yes | Kelly Preston, Melanie Brown, Idina Menzel |
| June 18 | Regis Philbin & Kelly Ripa | Yes | Steve Carell, Kate Voegele |
| June 19 | Regis Philbin & Kelly Ripa | Yes | Mike Myers, Yael Naim |
| June 20 | Regis Philbin & Kelly Ripa | Yes | Neil Diamond, Jack McBrayer, Grilling with the Stars |
| June 23 | Kelly Ripa & Mark Consuelos | Yes | Chris O'Donnell, JC Chasez, Angie Stone, Dangers posed by ticks and mosquitoes |
| June 30 | Kelly Ripa & Sam Champion | Yes | Abigail Breslin, Molly Ringwald, Summer Fun Week |

=== July 2008 ===
| Date | Co-Hosts | "Host Chat" | Guests/Segments |
|---|---|---|---|
| July 1 | Regis Philbin & Kelly Ripa | Yes | Montgomery Gentry, Summer Fun Week |
| July 2 | Regis Philbin & Kelly Ripa | Yes | Sigourney Weaver, Summer Fun Week |
| July 3 | Regis Philbin & Kelly Ripa | Yes | Vanessa Hudgens, Luke Perry, Summer Fun Week |
| July 4 | Regis Philbin & Kelly Ripa | Yes | Billy Ray Cyrus, Oscar De La Hoya, Summer Fun Week, Grilling with the Stars |
| July 7 | Regis Philbin & Kelly Ripa | Yes | Ben Kingsley, Kevin Nealon, Demi Lovato |
| July 8 | Regis Philbin & Kelly Ripa | Yes | Kyra Sedgwick, Bernadette Peters |
| July 9 | Regis Philbin & Kelly Ripa | Yes | LIVE's High Heel-a-thon in Central Park, Brendan Fraser |
| July 10 | Regis Philbin & Kelly Ripa | Yes | Josh Hartnett, winner of Hell's Kitchen |
| July 11 | Regis Philbin & Kelly Ripa | Yes | Gabrielle Union, Selma Blair, Colbie Caillat, Grilling with the Stars |
| July 14 | Regis Philbin & Kelly Ripa | Yes | James Denton, David Ortiz, Monumental Makeover Week |
| July 15 | Regis Philbin & Kelly Ripa | Yes | Colin Firth, Monumental Makeover Week |
| July 16 | Regis Philbin & Kelly Ripa | Yes | Meryl Streep, Heidi Klum, Monumental Makeover Week |
| July 17 | Regis Philbin & Kelly Ripa | Yes | Maggie Gyllenhaal, Randy Travis, Monumental Makeover Week |
| July 18 | Regis Philbin & Kelly Ripa | Yes | Pierce Brosnan, Monumental Makeover Week |
| July 21 | Regis Philbin & Kelly Ripa | Yes | Nick Lachey, Miss Universe 2008, Phil Mickelson |
| July 22 | Regis Philbin & Kelly Ripa | Yes | Will Ferrell, Caroline Rhea |
| July 23 | Regis Philbin & Kelly Ripa | Yes | Amanda Peet, Jennifer Hudson |
| July 24 | Regis Philbin & Kelly Ripa | Yes | Aaron Eckhart, Jim Cramer |
| July 25 | Regis Philbin & Kelly Ripa | Yes | Kasey Kahne, Grilling with the Stars |
| July 28 | Regis Philbin & Kelly Ripa | Yes | Carson Kressley, Amber Tamblyn, Akon & Colby O'Donis |
| July 29 | Regis Philbin & Kelly Ripa | Yes | Tim Gunn, Rick Springfield |
| July 30 | Regis Philbin & Kelly Ripa | Yes | Kevin Costner |
| July 31 | Regis Philbin & Kelly Ripa | Yes | Nathan Lane, Selena Gomez |

=== August 2008 ===
| Date | Co-Hosts | "Host Chat" | Guests/Segments |
|---|---|---|---|
| August 1 | Kelly Ripa & Cameron Mathison | Yes | Joan Allen, Tatum O'Neal, Grilling with the Stars |
| August 4 | Kelly Ripa & George Lopez | Yes | America Ferrera |
| August 5 | Kelly Ripa & Anderson Cooper | Yes | Luke Wilson, Blake Lively |
| August 6 | Kelly Ripa & Emeril Lagasse | Yes | Dennis Hopper, Sharon Osbourne |
| August 7 | Kelly Ripa & Seann William Scott | Yes | Penélope Cruz |
| August 8 | Kelly Ripa & Mark Consuelos | Yes | Kiefer Sutherland, Laurie Berkner, Grilling with the Stars |
| August 11 | Regis Philbin & Kelly Ripa | Yes | Rainn Wilson, Natasha Bedingfield, Jay Manuel |
| August 12 | Regis Philbin & Emily Procter | Yes | Susan Sarandon, Jonas Brothers |
| August 13 | Regis Philbin & Becki Newton | Yes | Ben Stiller |
| August 14 | Regis Philbin & Lisa Rinna | Yes | Anna Faris, Ana Ortiz |
| August 15 | Regis Philbin & Joanna Philbin | Yes | Robert Downey Jr., Katharine McPhee, Will Ferrell, Grilling with the Stars |

== Season 21 (2008–2009) ==
=== September 2008 ===
| Date | Co-Hosts | "Host Chat" | Guests/Segments |
|---|---|---|---|
| September 1 | Regis Philbin & Kelly Ripa | Yes | Benjamin Bratt, Leighton Meester, and LaDainian Tomlinson |
| September 2 | Regis Philbin & Kelly Ripa | Yes | Jeremy Piven, Lori Loughlin, and Live's A Beach Travel Trivia Grand Prize Drawing |
| September 3 | Regis Philbin & Kelly Ripa | Yes | Kevin Connolly, David Boreanaz, and Leona Lewis |
| September 4 | Regis Philbin & Kelly Ripa | Yes | Jerry O'Connell, Dr. Phil, and Vivica A. Fox |
| September 5 | Regis Philbin & Kelly Ripa | Yes | Shannen Doherty and Rachael Ray |
| September 8 | Regis Philbin & Kelly Ripa | Yes | Howie Mandel and Chace Crawford |
| September 9 | Regis Philbin & Kelly Ripa | Yes | Keira Knightley and Gavin DeGraw |
| September 10 | Regis Philbin & Kelly Ripa | Yes | Shirley MacLaine and Wayne Brady |
| September 11 | Regis Philbin & Kelly Ripa | Yes | Meg Ryan and Jon Hamm |
| September 12 | Kelly Ripa & Jeff Probst | Yes | Eva Mendes and Chris Meloni |
| September 15 | Regis Philbin & Kelly Ripa | Yes | Ricky Gervais and Guinness World Record Breaker Week |
| September 16 | Regis Philbin & Kelly Ripa | Yes | Samuel L. Jackson and Guinness World Record Breaker Week |
| September 17 | Regis Philbin & Kelly Ripa | Yes | Andrew McCarthy and Guinness World Record Breaker Week |
| September 18 | Regis Philbin & Kelly Ripa | Yes | Dana Delany, Dwyane Wade, and Guinness World Record Breaker Week |
| September 19 | Kelly Ripa & Kyle MacLachlan | Yes | Michael Chiklis, Kristy Lee Cook, and Guinness World Record Breaker Week |
| September 22 | Regis Philbin & Kelly Ripa | Yes | Kevin Dillon, David Blaine, and 2008 Relly Awards |
| September 23 | Regis Philbin & Kelly Ripa | Yes | Diane Lane, Poppy Montgomery, and 2008 Relly Awards |
| September 24 | Regis Philbin & Kelly Ripa | Yes | Richard Gere, America Ferrera, and 2008 Relly Awards |
| September 25 | Regis Philbin & Kelly Ripa | Yes | Chris Rock, Vanessa Williams, and 2008 Relly Awards |
| September 26 | Kelly Ripa & Nick Lachey | Yes | Victoria Beckham, Usain Bolt, and 2008 Relly Awards |
| September 29 | Regis Philbin & Kelly Ripa | Yes | Brooke Shields and Ali Larter |
| September 30 | Regis Philbin & Kelly Ripa | Yes | Julia Louis-Dreyfus and Alonzo Mourning |

=== October 2008 ===
| Date | Co-Hosts | "Host Chat" | Guests/Segments | "Regis and Kelly Inbox" |
|---|---|---|---|---|
| October 1 | Regis Philbin & Kelly Ripa | Yes | Kate Walsh, Kellie Pickler, and Quaker Oatmeal Dance Your Heart Out | No |
| October 2 | Regis Philbin & Kelly Ripa | Yes | Jo Frost, Diane Sawyer, and Quaker Oatmeal Dance Your Heart Out | No |
| October 3 | Kelly Ripa & Mark Consuelos | Yes | Blair Underwood, Jon & Kate Plus 8, and Robin Thicke | No |
| October 6 | Regis Philbin & Kelly Ripa | Yes | Alicia Keys, John Lithgow, and Quaker Oatmeal Dance Your Heart Out | No |
| October 7 | Regis Philbin & Kelly Ripa | Yes | Toy of the year Awards, Gary Sinise, and Sarah McLachlan | No |
| October 8 | Regis Philbin & Kelly Ripa | Yes | Debra Messing, Bill O'Reilly, and Project Runway Finalists | No |
| October 9 | Regis Philbin & Kelly Ripa | Yes | Molly Shannon and Peter Gros | No |
| October 10 | Regis Philbin & Kelly Ripa | Yes | Russell Crowe and Isaac Mizrahi | No |
| October 13 | Kelly Ripa & Randy Jackson | Yes | Christian Slater and Ed Westwick | Yes |
| October 14 | Kelly Ripa & Anderson Cooper | Yes | Queen Latifah, Rusty Wallace, and Nobu Matsuhisa | No |
| October 15 | Kelly Ripa & Anderson Cooper | Yes | James Marsden and Michael Urie | Yes |
| October 16 | Kelly Ripa & Bryant Gumbel | Yes | Edward Norton, Bernadette Peters, and Project Runway Winner | Yes |
| October 17 | Kelly Ripa & Howie Mandel | Yes | Kim Raver and Billy Bob Thornton & The Boxermasters | Yes |
| October 20 | Regis Philbin & Kelly Ripa | Yes | Judge Judy, Corbin Bleu, and CFA-Iams Cat Championship | No |
| October 21 | Regis Philbin & Kelly Ripa | Yes | Vanessa Hudgens, Jason O'Mara, and Gavin Rossdale | No |
| October 22 | Regis Philbin & Kelly Ripa | Yes | Zac Efron and Shawn Johnson | No |
| October 23 | Regis Philbin & Kelly Ripa | Yes | Whoopi Goldberg and Ashley Tisdale | Yes |
| October 24 | Kelly Ripa & Michael Chiklis | Yes | Gisele Bündchen and John Slattery | No |
| October 27 | Regis Philbin & Kelly Ripa | Yes | Marcia Cross and Katie Brown | Yes |
| October 28 | Regis Philbin & Kelly Ripa | Yes | Charles Gibson, Tom Nardone, and Craig Horner | No |
| October 29 | Regis Philbin & Kelly Ripa | Yes | Jane Krakowski, Halloween Masks!, and Dorothy Peterson | No |
| October 30 | Regis Philbin & Kelly Ripa | Yes | Tina Fey and "Kids of Live" Fashion Show | Yes |
| October 31 | Regis Philbin & Kelly Ripa | Yes | LIVE's Star Studded Halloween, Mario Lopez, Guy Fieri, and Halloween Costume Contest | No |

=== November 2008 ===
| Date | Co-Hosts | "Host Chat" | Guests/Segments | "Regis and Kelly Inbox" |
|---|---|---|---|---|
| November 3 | Regis Philbin & Kelly Ripa | Yes | David Schwimmer and Plain White T's | Yes |
| November 4 | Regis Philbin & Kelly Ripa | Yes | Robert Wagner and Miranda Cosgrove | Yes |
| November 5 | Regis Philbin & Kelly Ripa | Yes | Seann William Scott and Cedric the Entertainer | No |
| November 6 | Regis Philbin & Kelly Ripa | Yes | Paul Rudd and Dr. Laura Fisher | No |
| November 7 | Regis Philbin & Kelly Ripa | Yes | Ben Stiller and Dido | Yes |
| November 10 | Regis Philbin & Kelly Ripa | Yes | Jeff Goldblum and Regis & Kelly Do It Week | No |
| November 11 | Regis Philbin & Kelly Ripa | Yes | Misty May-Treanor, Seal, and Regis & Kelly Do It Week | No |
| November 12 | Regis Philbin & Kelly Ripa | Yes | Daniel Craig, David Archuleta, and Regis & Kelly Do It Week | Yes |
| November 13 | Regis Philbin & Kelly Ripa | Yes | Don Rickles, Miley Cyrus, and Regis & Kelly Do It Week | No |
| November 14 | Regis Philbin & Kelly Ripa | Yes | John Travolta, Quincy Jones, and Regis & Kelly Do It Week | No |
| November 17 | Regis Philbin & Kelly Ripa | Yes | Jenny McCarthy, Milo Ventimiglia, Miss J. Alexander, and Holiday S.O.S. Week | No |
| November 18 | Regis Philbin & Kelly Ripa | Yes | 2008 NASCAR Sprint Cup Series, Enrique Iglesias, and Holiday S.O.S. Week | No |
| November 19 | Regis Philbin & Kelly Ripa | Yes | David Cook and Holiday S.O.S. Week | Yes |
| November 20 | Regis Philbin & Kelly Ripa | Yes | Jimmy Smits, America's Next Top Model Winner, and Holiday S.O.S. Week | No |
| November 21 | Regis Philbin & Kelly Ripa | Yes | Kiefer Sutherland, Il Divo, and Holiday S.O.S. Week | No |
| November 24 | Regis Philbin & Kelly Ripa | Yes | Reese Witherspoon, and Thanksgiving Three Ways | No |
| November 25 | Regis Philbin & Kelly Ripa | Yes | Nicole Kidman, Thanksgiving Three Ways, and Tom Jones | No |
| November 26 | Regis Philbin & Kelly Ripa | Yes | Hugh Jackman, Kristen Stewart, and Thanksgiving Three Ways | Yes |
| November 28 | Regis Philbin & Kelly Ripa | Yes | Felicity Huffman, Paula Deen, and Carrot Top | No |

=== December 2008 ===
| Date | Co-Hosts | "Host Chat" | Guests/Segments | "Regis and Kelly Inbox" |
|---|---|---|---|---|
| December 1 | Regis Philbin & Kelly Ripa | Yes | Marisa Tomei and Jesse McCartney | Yes |
| December 2 | Regis Philbin & Kelly Ripa | Yes | Heidi Klum, Barenaked Ladies, and Terry Fator | No |
| December 3 | Regis Philbin & Kelly Ripa | Yes | John Leguizamo and Aretha Franklin | No |
| December 4 | Regis Philbin & Kelly Ripa | Yes | Kevin Bacon, The Bacon Brothers, and George Hamilton | No |
| December 8 | Regis Philbin & Kelly Ripa | Yes | William Shatner and The Amazing Race Winners | Yes |
| December 9 | Regis Philbin & Kelly Ripa | Yes | Jennifer Connelly and Freddy Rodriguez | Yes |
| December 10 | Regis Philbin & Kelly Ripa | Yes | Amy Adams and Jason Mraz | No |
| December 11 | Regis Philbin & Kelly Ripa | Yes | Keanu Reeves and Anderson Cooper | No |
| December 12 | Kelly Ripa & Anderson Cooper | Yes | Debra Messing and Michael Phelps | No |
| December 15 | Regis Philbin & Kelly Ripa | Yes | Rosario Dawson, Ken Mink, and Survivor: Gabon Winner | Yes |
| December 16 | Regis Philbin & Kelly Ripa | Yes | Kelly's Holiday Show Tour and Adam Sandler | Yes |
| December 17 | Regis Philbin & Kelly Ripa | Yes | Tom Cruise and Jamie Foxx | No |
| December 18 | Regis Philbin & Kelly Ripa | Yes | Jennifer Aniston and Enya | No |
| December 19 | Regis Philbin & Kelly Ripa | Yes | Eva Mendes and Alan Alda | No |
| December 22 | Regis Philbin & Kelly Ripa | Yes | Dustin Hoffman, Frank Gifford, Masi Oka, and Il Divo | No |
| December 23 | Regis Philbin & Kelly Ripa | Yes | LIVE's Holiday Celebration, Eric Dane, Faith Ford, Disney On Ice, Jason Mraz | No |
| December 24 | Regis Philbin & Kelly Ripa | Yes | LIVE's Christmas Eve Flashback | No |

=== January 2009 ===
| Date | Co-Hosts | "Host Chat" | Guests/Segments | "Regis and Kelly Inbox" |
|---|---|---|---|---|
| January 5 | Regis Philbin & Kelly Ripa | Yes | Anne Hathaway, Lisa Rinna, and Feeling Fine in '09 | Yes |
| January 6 | Regis Philbin & Kelly Ripa | Yes | Kate Hudson and Feeling Fine in '09 | Yes |
| January 7 | Regis Philbin & Kelly Ripa | Yes | Glenn Close and Feeling Fine in '09 | Yes |
| January 8 | Regis Philbin & Kelly Ripa | Yes | Kevin James and Feeling Fine in '09 | Yes |
| January 9 | Kelly Ripa & Howie Mandel | Yes | Kiefer Sutherland and Feeling Fine in '09 | No |
| January 12 | Regis Philbin & Kelly Ripa | Yes | Joan Rivers and Save a Dime in '09 | Yes |
| January 13 | Regis Philbin & Kelly Ripa | Yes | Zach Braff and Save a Dime in '09 | Yes |
| January 14 | Regis Philbin & Kelly Ripa | Yes | Daniel Craig and Save a Dime in '09 | Yes |
| January 15 | Regis Philbin & Kelly Ripa | Yes | Kate Winslet and Save a Dime in '09 | Yes |
| January 16 | Regis Philbin & Kelly Ripa | Yes | Brendan Fraser and Save a Dime in '09 | Yes |
| January 19 | Regis Philbin & Kelly Ripa | Yes | Kyra Sedgwick, Brody Jenner, and Kara DioGuardi | No |
| January 21 | Regis Philbin & Kelly Ripa | Yes | George Stephanopoulos, William H. Macy, and Watch to Win Contest Winner | Yes |
| January 22 | Regis Philbin & Kelly Ripa | Yes | Mira Sorvino and Fall Out Boy | No |
| January 23 | Kelly Ripa & Anderson Cooper | Yes | Eric McCormack | No |
| January 26 | Regis Philbin & Kelly Ripa | Yes | Miss America 2009, Joshua Jackson, and Ultimate Game Day Grub Week | No |
| January 27 | Regis Philbin & Kelly Ripa | Yes | Harry Connick, Jr. and Ultimate Game Day Grub Week | Yes |
| January 28 | Regis Philbin & Kelly Ripa | Yes | Evangeline Lilly and Ultimate Game Day Grub Week | Yes |
| January 29 | Regis Philbin & Kelly Ripa | Yes | Renée Zellweger, Demi Lovato, and Ultimate Game Day Grub Week | No |
| January 30 | Kelly Ripa & Ted McGinley | Yes | Mary-Louise Parker and Ultimate Game Day Grub Week | No |

=== February 2009 ===
| Date | Co-Hosts | "Host Chat" | Guests/Segments | "Regis and Kelly Inbox" |
|---|---|---|---|---|
| February 2 | Regis Philbin & Kelly Ripa | Yes | Teri Hatcher and Mel B | Yes |
| February 3 | Regis Philbin & Kelly Ripa | Yes | Steve Martin and Anil Kapoor | No |
| February 4 | Regis Philbin & Kelly Ripa | Yes | Katie Couric and Joe Torre | No |
| February 5 | Regis Philbin & Kelly Ripa | Yes | Stockard Channing and Dierks Bentley | Yes |
| February 9 | Regis Philbin & Kelly Ripa | Yes | Tony Parker, Andy Samberg, and Will You Marry Me Week | No |
| February 10 | Regis Philbin & Kelly Ripa | Yes | Isla Fisher, Chef Gordon Ramsay, and Will You Marry Me Week | No |
| February 11 | Regis Philbin & Kelly Ripa | Yes | Santonio Holmes, Annie Lennox, and Will You Marry Me Week | No |
| February 12 | Regis Philbin & Kelly Ripa | Yes | Naomi Watts, Eliza Dushku, and Will You Marry Me Week | No |
| February 16 | Regis Philbin & Kelly Ripa | Yes | Jonas Brothers, Freida Pinto, and Dating with the Stars Week | No |
| February 17 | Regis Philbin & Joy Philbin | Yes | Molly Sims, Dating with the Stars, and Daytona 500 Winner | No |
| February 18 | Regis Philbin & Becki Newton | Yes | Barbara Walters, Neal McDonough, and Dating with the Stars | No |
| February 19 | Regis Philbin & Kelly Ripa | Yes | Kevin Bacon, New Kids on the Block, and Dating with the Stars Week | No |
| February 20 | Kelly Ripa & Randy Jackson | Yes | Selma Blair, Chris Byrne, and Dating with the Stars Week | Yes |
| February 26 | Kelly Ripa & Anderson Cooper | Yes | Donald Trump and 3 Doors Down | No |
| February 27 | Kelly Ripa & Anderson Cooper | Yes | Tom Selleck and Top Chef Winner | No |

=== March 2009 ===
| Date | Co-Hosts | "Host Chat" | Guests/Segments | "Regis and Kelly Inbox" |
|---|---|---|---|---|
| March 2 | Regis Philbin & Kelly Ripa | Yes | David Spade | No |
| March 3 | Regis Philbin & Kelly Ripa | Yes | Cynthia Nixon and Van Morrison | No |
| March 4 | Regis Philbin & Kelly Ripa | Yes | Carla Gugino and Caroline Rhea | No |
| March 5 | Regis Philbin & Kelly Ripa | Yes | Ted Danson and Bruno Tonioli | No |
| March 6 | Regis Philbin & Kelly Ripa | Yes | Felicity Huffman and Dylan and Cole Sprouse | No |
| March 9 | Regis Philbin & Kelly Ripa | Yes | Dwayne Johnson and Beautiful Baby Week | No |
| March 10 | Regis Philbin & Kelly Ripa | Yes | Marcia Cross, Whitney Port and Beautiful Baby Week | No |
| March 11 | Regis Philbin & Kelly Ripa | Yes | David Boreanaz, Corbin Bleu and Beautiful Baby Week | No |
| March 12 | Regis Philbin & Kelly Ripa | Yes | Paul Rudd, Pussycat Dolls and Beautiful Baby Week | No |
| March 13 | Regis Philbin & Kelly Ripa | Yes | Larry the Cable Guy, Kelly Clarkson and Beautiful Baby Week | No |
| March 16 | Regis Philbin & Kelly Ripa | Yes | Drew Carey and 12th American Idol Finalist | Yes |
| March 17 | Regis Philbin & Kelly Ripa | Yes | Nicolas Cage and The Priests | No |
| March 18 | Regis Philbin & Kelly Ripa | Yes | Julia Roberts and LeAnn Rimes | No |
| March 19 | Regis Philbin & Kelly Ripa | Yes | Craig Ferguson, Jason Segel, and Dancing with the Stars | No |
| March 20 | Regis Philbin & Kelly Ripa | Yes | Clive Owen, Keke Palmer, and Gavin DeGraw | No |
| March 23 | Regis Philbin & Kelly Ripa | Yes | Kathryn Morris, 11th American Idol Finalist, and Bad Hair Week | No |
| March 24 | Regis Philbin & Kelly Ripa | Yes | Kiefer Sutherland and Bad Hair Week | No |
| March 25 | Regis Philbin & Kelly Ripa | Yes | Reese Witherspoon, Martina McBride, and Bad Hair Week | No |
| March 26 | Regis Philbin & Kelly Ripa | Yes | Christina Applegate, Dancing with the Stars, and Bad Hair Week | No |
| March 27 | Regis Philbin & Kelly Ripa | Yes | Seth Rogen and Bad Hair Week | No |
| March 30 | Regis Philbin & Kelly Ripa | Yes | Hugh Laurie, 10th American Idol Finalist and Are You Kidding Me? Whiz Kid Challenge | No |
| March 31 | Regis Philbin & Kelly Ripa | Yes | Sharon and Ozzy Osbourne, John Cena and Are You Kidding Me? Whiz Kid Challenge | No |

=== April 2009 ===
| Date | Co-Hosts | "Host Chat" | Guests/Segments | "Regis and Kelly Inbox" |
|---|---|---|---|---|
| April 1 | Regis Philbin & Kelly Ripa | Yes | Michael J. Fox, Cloris Leachman, Diana Krall and Are You Kidding Me? Whiz Kid Challenge | No |
| April 2 | Regis Philbin & Kelly Ripa | Yes | Marg Helgenberger, Dancing with the Stars and Are You Kidding Me? Whiz Kid Challenge | No |
| April 3 | Kelly Ripa & Nick Lachey | Yes | Vin Diesel, Prom dresses and Are You Kidding Me? Whiz Kid Challenge | No |
| April 6 | Regis Philbin & Kelly Ripa | Yes | LIVE! in New Orleans, Emeril Lagasse, Chris Paul, 9th American Idol Finalist and The Rebirth Brass Band | No |
| April 7 | Regis Philbin & Kelly Ripa | Yes | LIVE! in New Orleans, Faith Ford, Reggie Bush, Jesse McCartney and The Storyville Stompers | Yes |
| April 8 | Regis Philbin & Kelly Ripa | Yes | LIVE! in New Orleans, Billy Ray Cyrus, Harry Hamlin and Big Sam's Funky Nation | Yes |
| April 9 | Regis Philbin & Kelly Ripa | Yes | LIVE! in New Orleans, Miley Cyrus, Faith Ford and Rockin' Dopsie Jr. & The Zydeco Twisters | No |
| April 10 | Regis Philbin & Kelly Ripa | Yes | Diane Sawyer, Chelsea Handler, Brenda Song, Annie Lennox | No |
| April 13 | Regis Philbin & Kelly Ripa | Yes | Nancy O'Dell, 8th American Idol Finalist, and New York Auto Show Week | No |
| April 14 | Regis Philbin & Kelly Ripa | Yes | Kathie Lee Gifford and New York Auto Show Week | No |
| April 15 | Kelly Ripa & Mark Consuelos | Yes | Russell Crowe and New York Auto Show Week | No |
| April 16 | Regis Philbin & Joy Philbin | Yes | Ben Affleck and New York Auto Show Week | No |
| April 17 | Kelly Ripa & Mark Consuelos | Yes | Drew Barrymore and New York Auto Show Week | Yes |
| April 20 | Regis Philbin & Kelly Ripa | Yes | Chevy Chase, Daniel Dae Kim, and Green Week | No |
| April 21 | Regis Philbin & Kelly Ripa | Yes | Jimmy Fallon, Neil Sedaka, and Green Week | No |
| April 22 | Regis Philbin & Kelly Ripa | Yes | Jennifer Lopez, Brooke Shields, Cirque du Soleil, and Green Week | No |
| April 23 | Regis Philbin & Kelly Ripa | Yes | Amy Poehler, Roselyn Sánchez, and Green Week | No |
| April 24 | Kelly Ripa & Neil Patrick Harris | Yes | Jamie Foxx, Ali Larter, and Green Week | No |
| April 27 | Regis Philbin & Kelly Ripa | Yes | Allison Janney, 7th American Idol Finalist, 6th American Idol Finalist, and Broadway Week | No |
| April 28 | Regis Philbin & Kelly Ripa | Yes | Matthew Fox, Jill Hennessy, and Broadway Week | No |
| April 29 | Regis Philbin & Kelly Ripa | Yes | Matthew McConaughey and Broadway Week | Yes |
| April 30 | Regis Philbin & Kelly Ripa | Yes | Hugh Jackman, Dancing with the Stars and Broadway Week | No |

=== May 2009 ===
| Date | Co-Hosts | "Host Chat" | Guests/Segments | "Regis and Kelly Inbox" |
|---|---|---|---|---|
| May 1 | Regis Philbin & Kelly Ripa | Yes | Jennifer Garner and Broadway Week | Yes |
| May 4 | Regis Philbin & Kelly Ripa | Yes | Jonathan Rhys Meyers, Zachary Quinto, and Ciara | Yes |
| May 5 | Regis Philbin & Kelly Ripa | Yes | LIVE! in Miami, Nicole Richie, Dr. Ana Maria Polo, DJ Danny Daze and Regis visits some of the most legendary spots of Miami Beach then and now | No |
| May 6 | Regis Philbin & Kelly Ripa | Yes | LIVE! in Miami, Rob Lowe, 5th American Idol Finalist, Marlins Manatees, DJ Danny Daze and Kelly Goes Miami Wild | No |
| May 7 | Regis Philbin & Kelly Ripa | Yes | LIVE! in Miami, Eric Dane, Dancing with the Stars, DJ Danny Daze and Regis and Kelly Spoil Miami's Moms | Yes |
| May 8 | Regis Philbin & Kelly Ripa | No | LIVE's Mom's Dream Come True Special | No |
| May 11 | Regis Philbin & Kelly Ripa | Yes | Eric Bana, 4th American Idol Finalist, and Winners Week | Yes |
| May 12 | Regis Philbin & Kelly Ripa | Yes | Tom Hanks and Winners Week | No |
| May 13 | Regis Philbin & Kelly Ripa | Yes | Ewan McGregor, Jewel, and Winners Week | No |
| May 14 | Regis Philbin & Kelly Ripa | Yes | Jeff Probst, Winners Week | Yes |
| May 15 | Regis Philbin & Kelly Ripa | Yes | Nathan Lane and Winners Week | Yes |
| May 18 | Regis Philbin & Kelly Ripa | Yes | Simon Baker and Survivor winner | Yes |
| May 19 | Regis Philbin & Kelly Ripa | Yes | Ben Stiller and Jesse James | Yes |
| May 20 | Regis Philbin & Kelly Ripa | Yes | Ricky Gervais and Dancing with the Stars | Yes |
| May 21 | Regis Philbin & Kelly Ripa | Yes | Susan Sarandon and Dancing with the Stars | Yes |
| May 22 | Regis Philbin & Kelly Ripa | Yes | Matthew Broderick and Bridget Regan | No |
| May 25 | Kelly Ripa & Jimmy Kimmel | Yes | Heidi & Spencer Pratt, and Chris Byrne | Yes |
| May 26 | Regis Philbin & Kelly Ripa | Yes | American Idol winner and Indianapolis 500 winner | Yes |
| May 27 | Regis Philbin & Kelly Ripa | Yes | American Idol Runner-Up and Dr. Greg Yapalater | Yes |
| May 28 | Regis Philbin & Kelly Ripa | Yes | American Idol 3rd Place and Jeff Daniels | Yes |
| May 29 | Regis Philbin & Kelly Ripa | Yes | Marcia Gay Harden, Cat Deeley and The Love Chef | Yes |

=== June 2009 ===
| Date | Co-Hosts | "Host Chat" | Guests/Segments | "Regis and Kelly Inbox" |
|---|---|---|---|---|
| June 1 | Regis Philbin & Kelly Ripa | Yes | John Goodman and Jillian Harris | No |
| June 2 | Kelly Ripa & Pat Sajak | Yes | Kyra Sedgwick and Scripps Spelling Bee | No |
| June 3 | Kelly Ripa & Will Ferrell | Yes | Peter Gros and MC Hammer | Yes |
| June 4 | Kelly Ripa & Anderson Cooper | Yes | Denise Richards and Jeffrey Donovan | No |
| June 5 | Kelly Ripa & Anderson Cooper | Yes | Bradley Cooper, Catherine Bell, and Ultimate Hometown Grill Off | No |
| June 8 | Kelly Ripa & Mark Consuelos | Yes | Wilmer Valderrama and Imagination Movers | No |
| June 9 | Regis Philbin & Kelly Ripa | Yes | Jeff Gordon and Michael Vartan | No |
| June 10 | Regis Philbin & Kelly Ripa | Yes | Alan Alda and Dr. Greg Yapalater | No |
| June 11 | Regis Philbin & Kelly Ripa | Yes | John Krasinski and Betty White | No |
| June 12 | Regis Philbin & Kelly Ripa | Yes | Denzel Washington and Ultimate Hometown Grill Off | No |
| June 15 | Regis Philbin & Megan Mullally | Yes | Jack Black and Summer School Pop Quiz | Yes |
| June 16 | Regis Philbin & Molly Shannon | Yes | Selena Gomez and Summer School Pop Quiz | No |
| June 17 | Regis Philbin & Joy Philbin | Yes | Sandra Bullock and Summer School Pop Quiz | No |
| June 18 | Regis Philbin & Joy Philbin | Yes | Ryan Reynolds, Summer School Pop Quiz and Ultimate Hometown Grill Off | No |
| June 23 | Regis Philbin & Kara DioGuardi | Yes | Nick Cannon, Lucas Glover, and Ashanti | No |
| June 24 | Regis Philbin & Bernadette Peters | Yes | Cameron Diaz and Mark Feuerstein | Yes |
| June 25 | Regis Philbin & Joanna Philbin | Yes | Shia LaBeouf and Il Divo | No |
| June 26 | Regis Philbin & William Shatner | Yes | Ray Romano, Megan Fox, and Ultimate Hometown Grill Off | No |
| June 29 | Kelly Ripa & Mark Consuelos | Yes | Josh Duhamel and Star Spangled Savings: 4 July Entertaining Week | Yes |
| June 30 | Kelly Ripa & Anderson Cooper | Yes | Seann William Scott, Kristinia DeBarge and Star Spangled Savings: 4 July Entertaining Week | Yes |

=== July 2009 ===
| Date | Co-Hosts | "Host Chat" | Guests/Segments | "Regis and Kelly Inbox" |
|---|---|---|---|---|
| July 1 | Kelly Ripa & Bryant Gumbel | Yes | John Leguizamo and Star Spangled Savings: 4 July Entertaining Week | No |
| July 2 | Kelly Ripa & Jerry O'Connell | Yes | The Real Housewives of New Jersey and Star Spangled Savings: 4 July Entertaining Week | No |
| July 3 | Kelly Ripa & Jerry O'Connell | Yes | Brad Paisley, Neal E. Boyd and Ultimate Hometown Grill Off | No |
| July 6 | Regis Philbin & Kelly Ripa | Yes | Jonas Brothers, Mary McCormack, Nigella Lawson and Sleep Week | No |
| July 7 | Regis Philbin & Kelly Ripa | Yes | Serena Williams, Rainn Wilson, and Sleep Week | No |
| July 8 | Regis Philbin & Kelly Ripa | Yes | Hayden Panettiere, 100 Year-old Tennis Champ, and Sleep Week | No |
| July 9 | Regis Philbin & Kelly Ripa | Yes | Rupert Grint, Sugar Ray, and Sleep Week | No |
| July 10 | Regis Philbin & Kelly Ripa | Yes | Daniel Radcliffe, Tom Cavanagh, Ultimate Hometown Grill Off, and Sleep Week | No |
| July 13 | Regis Philbin & Kelly Ripa | Yes | Emma Watson and Celebrity Look-Alike Week | Yes |
| July 14 | Regis Philbin & Kelly Ripa | Yes | Dylan McDermott and Celebrity Look-Alike Week | No |
| July 15 | Regis Philbin & Kelly Ripa | Yes | David Beckham and Celebrity Look-Alike Week | No |
| July 16 | Regis Philbin & Kelly Ripa | Yes | Adrian Grenier, Twisted Sister, and Celebrity Look-Alike Week | No |
| July 17 | Regis Philbin & Kelly Ripa | Yes | Heidi Klum, Celebrity Look-Alike Week, and Ultimate Hometown Grill Off | No |
| July 20 | Regis Philbin & Kelly Ripa | Yes | Alanis Morissette, New York Yankees, and Date Night Makeover Week | No |
| July 21 | Regis Philbin & Kelly Ripa | Yes | Katherine Heigl, Jordin Sparks and Date Night Makeover Week | No |
| July 22 | Regis Philbin & Kelly Ripa | Yes | Anna Paquin and Date Night Makeover Week | Yes |
| July 23 | Regis Philbin & Kelly Ripa | Yes | Kevin Nealon, Flo Rida and Date Night Makeover Week | No |
| July 24 | Regis Philbin & Kelly Ripa | Yes | Gerard Butler, Ultimate Hometown Grill Off, and Date Night Makeover Week | No |
| July 27 | Regis Philbin & Kelly Ripa | Yes | Holly Hunter and Top Dog Week | No |
| July 28 | Regis Philbin & Kelly Ripa | Yes | Jonah Hill and Top Dog Week | No |
| July 29 | Kelly Ripa & Anderson Cooper | Yes | Jillian Harris and Top Dog Week | No |
| July 30 | Kelly Ripa & Anderson Cooper | Yes | Amy Adams, Leslie Mann, and Top Dog Week | No |
| July 31 | Kelly Ripa & Bette Midler | Yes | Adam Sandler, Top Dog Week and Ultimate Hometown Grill Off | No |

=== August 2009 ===
| Date | Co-Hosts | "Host Chat" | Guests/Segments | "Regis and Kelly Inbox" |
|---|---|---|---|---|
| August 3 | Kelly Ripa & Louis Aguirre | Yes | Sienna Miller, and Joan Rivers | No |
| August 4 | Kelly Ripa & Pat Tomasulo | Yes | Vanessa Hudgens | No |
| August 5 | Kelly Ripa & Chris Parente | Yes | Steve Zahn and Channing Tatum | Yes |
| August 6 | Kelly Ripa & Jason Colthorp | Yes | Jeremy Piven | Yes |
| August 7 | Kelly Ripa & Jeff Varner | Yes | David Cook, Susan Lucci, and Ultimate Hometown Grill Off | No |
| August 10 | Kelly Ripa & Ashton Kutcher | Yes | Lisa Kudrow and So You Think You Can Dance | No |
| August 11 | Regis Philbin & Kelly Ripa | Yes | Jesse L. Martin and Anne Heche | Yes |
| August 12 | Regis Philbin & Kelly Ripa | Yes | Rachel McAdams, Karina Smirnoff & Maksim Chmerkovskiy, and David Cassidy | No |
| August 13 | Regis Philbin & Kelly Ripa | Yes | Jon Hamm and Kate Gosselin | Yes |
| August 14 | Regis Philbin & Kelly Ripa | Yes | Stanley Tucci, Candy Spelling, and Ultimate Hometown Grill Off | No |
| August 17 | Regis Philbin & Lucy Bustamante | Yes | Carrie Ann Inaba, Diane Kruger, and Jordin Sparks | Yes |
| August 18 | Regis Philbin & Janelle Wang | Yes | James Spader and School Lunch Makeovers | Yes |
| August 19 | Regis Philbin & Sandra Shaw | Yes | Tim Gunn and Skin Myths: True or False | Yes |
| August 20 | Regis Philbin & Tram Mai | Yes | Edie Falco, and Trinny Woodall & Susannah Constantine | Yes |
| August 21 | Regis Philbin & Tamara Taggart | Yes | Renée Zellweger, Geraldo Rivera, and Ultimate Hometown Grill Off | No |

== Season 22 (2009–2010) ==
=== September 2009 ===
| Date | Co-Hosts | "Host Chat" | Guests/Segments | "Regis and Kelly Inbox" |
|---|---|---|---|---|
| September 7 | Regis Philbin & Kelly Ripa | Yes | Stephen Moyer, Jerry Ferrara, and Rachel Zoe | No |
| September 8 | Regis Philbin & Kelly Ripa | Yes | Queen Latifah and AnnaLynne McCord | Yes |
| September 9 | Regis Philbin & Kelly Ripa | Yes | Tyler Perry and Michael Douglas | No |
| September 10 | Regis Philbin & Kelly Ripa | Yes | Jason Bateman, Amber Tamblyn, and Smokey Robinson | Yes |
| September 14 | Regis Philbin & Kelly Ripa | Yes | Chace Crawford, Michael Strahan, Kim Clijsters, and Guinness World Record Breaker Week | No |
| September 15 | Regis Philbin & Kelly Ripa | Yes | Aaron Eckhart, Laura Leighton, and Guinness World Record Breaker Week | No |
| September 16 | Regis Philbin & Kelly Ripa | Yes | Megan Fox, Serena Williams, and Guinness World Record Breaker Week | Yes |
| September 17 | Regis Philbin & Kelly Ripa | Yes | Dennis Quaid, 2009 NASCAR Sprint Cup Series, and Guinness World Record Breaker Week | No |
| September 18 | Kelly Ripa & David Duchovny | Yes | America's Got Talent winner Kevin Skinner, Ricky Gervais, and Guinness World Record Breaker Week | No |
| September 21 | Regis Philbin & Kelly Ripa | Yes | Julianna Margulies and David Gray | Yes |
| September 22 | Regis Philbin & Kelly Ripa | Yes | Christian Slater and LL Cool J | Yes |
| September 23 | Regis Philbin & Kelly Ripa | Yes | Clive Owen and Melina Kanakaredes | Yes |
| September 24 | Regis Philbin & Kelly Ripa | Yes | Laurence Fishburne and Whitney Port | Yes |
| September 25 | Kelly Ripa & Jeff Probst | Yes | Jude Law, John Krasinski, and Jo Frost | Yes |
| September 28 | Regis Philbin & Kelly Ripa | Yes | Eli Manning and 2009 Relly Awards | No |
| September 29 | Regis Philbin & Kelly Ripa | Yes | Patricia Heaton and 2009 Relly Awards | No |
| September 30 | Regis Philbin & Kelly Ripa | Yes | Kelsey Grammer and 2009 Relly Awards | No |

=== October 2009 ===
| Date | Co-Hosts | "Host Chat" | Guests/Segments | "Regis and Kelly Inbox" |
|---|---|---|---|---|
| October 1 | Regis Philbin & Kelly Ripa | Yes | Woody Harrelson and 2009 Relly Awards | No |
| October 2 | Kelly Ripa & Mark Consuelos | Yes | Selena Gomez, Disney Familyfun's 18th Annual Toy of the Years Awards, and 2009 Relly Awards | No |
| October 5 | Regis Philbin & Kelly Ripa | Yes | Eddie Cibrian and Melissa Etheridge | Yes |
| October 6 | Regis Philbin & Kelly Ripa | Yes | Larry David and John Stamos | No |
| October 7 | Regis Philbin & Kelly Ripa | Yes | Chevy Chase and Julie Andrews | Yes |
| October 8 | Regis Philbin & Kelly Ripa | Yes | Vince Vaughn and Michael Kors | No |
| October 9 | Kelly Ripa & Anderson Cooper | Yes | Padma Lakshmi and Joss Stone | Yes |
| October 12 | Regis Philbin & Kelly Ripa | Yes | Forest Whitaker and Alicia Keys | Yes |
| October 13 | Regis Philbin & Kelly Ripa | Yes | Uma Thurman and Ivanka Trump | No |
| October 14 | Regis Philbin & Kelly Ripa | Yes | Minnie Driver, Colbie Caillat, and Regis gets a flu shot | No |
| October 15 | Regis Philbin & Kelly Ripa | Yes | Mario Lopez and Monty Python | Yes |
| October 16 | Kelly Ripa & Anderson Cooper | Yes | Penn Badgley and Halloween Masks | No |
| October 19 | Regis Philbin & Kelly Ripa | Yes | Hilary Swank, Memory Expert Dave Farrow, and CFA Iams Cat Championship | No |
| October 20 | Regis Philbin & Kelly Ripa | Yes | Garry Shandling and Jane Krakowski | No |
| October 21 | Regis Philbin & Kelly Ripa | Yes | Ewan McGregor and Jim Cramer | No |
| October 22 | Regis Philbin & Kelly Ripa | Yes | Willem Dafoe and Tracy Morgan | No |
| October 23 | Kelly Ripa & Kyle MacLachlan | Yes | Jason Alexander and Eugene Levy | No |
| October 26 | Regis Philbin & Kelly Ripa | Yes | Judge Judy and Halloween Week | No |
| October 27 | Regis Philbin & Kelly Ripa | Yes | Courteney Cox, Creed, and Halloween Week | No |
| October 28 | Regis Philbin & Kelly Ripa | Yes | Patrick Dempsey, Brody Jenner, and Halloween Week | No |
| October 29 | Regis Philbin & Kelly Ripa | Yes | Daniel Craig, Don Rickles, and Halloween Week | No |
| October 30 | Regis Philbin & Kelly Ripa | Yes | LIVE's Reality Bites Halloween Spectacular, Donald Trump, and Carrie Ann Inaba | No |

=== November 2009 ===
| Date | Co-Hosts | "Host Chat" | Guests/Segments | "Regis and Kelly Inbox" |
|---|---|---|---|---|
| November 2 | Regis Philbin & Kelly Ripa | Yes | Jenny McCarthy and Ted Danson | Yes |
| November 3 | Regis Philbin & Kelly Ripa | Yes | Reba McEntire and Emeril Lagasse | Yes |
| November 4 | Regis Philbin & Kelly Ripa | Yes | Julia Louis-Dreyfus and Sean Kingston | Yes |
| November 5 | Regis Philbin & Kelly Ripa | Yes | Bernadette Peters and Carrie Underwood | Yes |
| November 6 | Regis Philbin & Kelly Ripa | Yes | James Marsden and Project Runway Finalists | No |
| November 9 | Regis Philbin & Kelly Ripa | Yes | Meredith Vieira, Dana Delany, and Home for the Holiday Makeovers Week | No |
| November 10 | Regis Philbin & Kelly Ripa | Yes | John Cusack, Robin Roberts, and Home for the Holiday Makeovers Week | No |
| November 11 | Regis Philbin & Kelly Ripa | Yes | Andre Agassi, Martin Short, and Home for the Holiday Makeovers Week | No |
| November 12 | Regis Philbin & Kelly Ripa | Yes | Kate Walsh and Home for the Holiday Makeovers Week | No |
| November 13 | Regis Philbin & Kelly Ripa | Yes | Jimmy Smits, Jamie Oliver, and Home for the Holiday Makeovers Week | No |
| November 16 | Regis Philbin & Kelly Ripa | Yes | Anderson Cooper and The Hayes Family | No |
| November 17 | Regis Philbin & Kelly Ripa | Yes | Keanu Reeves and Heidi & Spencer Pratt | No |
| November 18 | Regis Philbin & Kelly Ripa | Yes | Kristen Stewart and Kris Allen | Yes |
| November 19 | Regis Philbin & Kelly Ripa | Yes | Robert Pattinson, America's Next Top Model Winner, and Thanksgiving Food with Joy | No |
| November 20 | Regis Philbin & Kelly Ripa | Yes | Penélope Cruz, Taylor Lautner, and Kelly & Mark go back to "All My Children" | No |
| November 23 | Regis Philbin & Kelly Ripa | Yes | LIVE! in Las Vegas, Mark Harmon, David Cook, Project Runway winner Irina Shabayeva makes Kelly a wedding dress and Kelly learns some of the acrobatic moves that make the unbelievable show La Rêve such a sensational attraction | No |
| November 24 | Regis Philbin & Kelly Ripa | Yes | LIVE! in Las Vegas, Jimmy Kimmel, Carrot Top and Kelly relives her trip down the aisle at the popular "Chapel of the Bells" | No |
| November 25 | Regis Philbin & Kelly Ripa | Yes | LIVE! in Las Vegas, Thomas Gibson, Regis & Joy and Kelly visits the cast of "The Beatles Love" by Cirque du Soleil | No |
| November 27 | Regis Philbin & Kelly Ripa | Yes | LIVE! in Las Vegas, Thanksgiving Leftovers, Neil Patrick Harris, Uncle Kracker and Regis takes a special helicopter ride above the Vegas strip and stops at the breathtaking Grand Canyon | No |
| November 30 | Regis Philbin & Kelly Ripa | Yes | Matt Dillon, Ashley Greene, Miranda Cosgrove, and Pete Yorn and Scarlett Johansson | No |

=== December 2009 ===
| Date | Co-Hosts | "Host Chat" | Guests/Segments | "Regis and Kelly Inbox" |
|---|---|---|---|---|
| December 1 | Kelly Ripa & Howie Mandel | Yes | Cheryl Hines | No |
| December 2 | Kelly Ripa & Michael Bublé | Yes | Morgan Freeman and Lance Armstrong | Yes |
| December 3 | Kelly Ripa & Anderson Cooper | Yes | Meg Ryan, Jermaine, Tito, Jackie and Marlon Jackson | Yes |
| December 4 | Kelly Ripa & Christian Slater | Yes | Kate Beckinsale and Sting | Yes |
| December 7 | Kelly Ripa & Bryant Gumbel | Yes | Ray Romano, John Lithgow, and Inside The Chef's Kitchen | No |
| December 8 | Kelly Ripa & Bryant Gumbel | Yes | Julianne Hough, Terrence Howard, and Inside The Chef's Kitchen | No |
| December 9 | Kelly Ripa & Jeff Probst | Yes | Catherine Zeta-Jones, The Biggest Loser Winner, and Inside The Chef's Kitchen | Yes |
| December 10 | Kelly Ripa & Jeff Probst | Yes | Mariah Carey, Billy Ray Cyrus, and Inside The Chef's Kitchen | Yes |
| December 11 | Kelly Ripa & Jeff Probst | Yes | Kate Hudson, Kerry Washington, Inside The Chef's Kitchen | Yes |
| December 14 | Kelly Ripa & Anderson Cooper | Yes | Colin Firth and Holiday Savings Gift Guide Week | Yes |
| December 15 | Kelly Ripa & Anderson Cooper | Yes | Fergie, Ne-Yo, and Holiday Savings Gift Guide Week | Yes |
| December 16 | Kelly Ripa & Anderson Cooper | Yes | Hugh Grant, Judi Dench, and Holiday Savings Gift Guide Week | Yes |
| December 17 | Kelly Ripa & Mark Consuelos | Yes | Sarah Jessica Parker and Holiday Savings Gift Guide Week | Yes |
| December 18 | Kelly Ripa & Mark Consuelos | Yes | Robert Downey Jr. and Holiday Savings Gift Guide Week | Yes |
| December 21 | Kelly Ripa & Mark Consuelos | Yes | Jude Law, Sting, Disney on Ice, Perfect Tree | Yes |
| December 22 | Kelly Ripa & Mark Consuelos | Yes | LIVE's Holiday Celebration, Nicole Kidman, David Archuleta, The Rockettes and Tavern on the Green | No |

=== January 2010 ===
| Date | Co-Hosts | "Host Chat" | Guests/Segments | "Regis and Kelly Inbox" |
|---|---|---|---|---|
| January 4 | Regis Philbin & Kelly Ripa | Yes | Chris Meloni, Jake Pavelka, and New Year, New You: Guide to Better Eating Week | No |
| January 5 | Regis Philbin & Kelly Ripa | Yes | Jenna Elfman, Chesley Sullenberger, and New Year, New You: Guide to Better Eating Week | No |
| January 6 | Regis Philbin & Kelly Ripa | Yes | Tim Allen, Katharine McPhee, and New Year, New You: Guide to Better Eating Week | Yes |
| January 7 | Regis Philbin & Kelly Ripa | Yes | Amy Adams, Gabourey Sidibe, and New Year, New You: Guide to Better Eating Week | No |
| January 8 | Kelly Ripa & Nick Jonas | Yes | Zach Braff, Marion Cotillard, and New Year, New You: Guide to Better Eating Week | Yes |
| January 11 | Regis Philbin & Kelly Ripa | Yes | Valerie Bertinelli and Nathan Fillion | Yes |
| January 12 | Regis Philbin & Kelly Ripa | Yes | Jennifer Connelly | Yes |
| January 13 | Regis Philbin & Kelly Ripa | Yes | Freddie Prinze, Jr. and Tim Gunn | Yes |
| January 14 | Regis Philbin & Kelly Ripa | Yes | Kiefer Sutherland and Norah Jones | No |
| January 15 | Kelly Ripa & Mark Consuelos | Yes | Denzel Washington, Matt Bomer, and Fitness Friday | No |
| January 18 | Regis Philbin & Kelly Ripa | Yes | Jeff Bridges, Ian Somerhalder, Carrie Underwood and Peter Gros | No |
| January 19 | Regis Philbin & Kelly Ripa | Yes | Randy Jackson and Ashley Judd | Yes |
| January 20 | Regis Philbin & Kelly Ripa | Yes | Dwayne Johnson and Becki Newton | Yes |
| January 21 | Regis Philbin & Kelly Ripa | Yes | Brendan Fraser, Masi Oka, and Richard "Ack Ack" Ackerman | Yes |
| January 22 | Kelly Ripa & Jerry O'Connell | Yes | Harrison Ford, Lucy Lawless, and Fitness Friday | Yes |
| January 25 | Kelly Ripa & Mark Consuelos | Yes | Glenn Close and Tracey Ullman | Yes |
| January 26 | Kelly Ripa & Martin Short | Yes | Josh Duhamel and Home Remedies | Yes |
| January 27 | Kelly Ripa & David Duchovny | Yes | Claire Danes | Yes |
| January 28 | Kelly Ripa & Jeff Probst | Yes | Julianne Moore and Nick Thompson | No |
| January 29 | Kelly Ripa & Mark Consuelos | Yes | Kristen Bell, Christine Baranski, Project Ack Ack, and Fitness Friday | No |

=== February 2010 ===
| Date | Co-Hosts | "Host Chat" | Guests/Segments | "Regis and Kelly Inbox" |
|---|---|---|---|---|
| February 1 | Regis Philbin & Kelly Ripa | Yes | Jonathan Rhys Meyers | Yes |
| February 2 | Regis Philbin & Kelly Ripa | Yes | Jesse Tyler Ferguson and Vanessa Williams | Yes |
| February 3 | Regis Philbin & Kelly Ripa | Yes | Jessica Alba and Channing Tatum | No |
| February 4 | Regis Philbin & Kelly Ripa | Yes | Michael Strahan, John Travolta, and Project Ack Ack | Yes |
| February 5 | Regis Philbin & Kelly Ripa | Yes | Robin Thicke, Pierce Brosnan, Project Ack Ack, and Fitness Friday | Yes |
| February 8 | Regis Philbin & Kelly Ripa | Yes | Bill Paxton, Project Ack Ack, and Inside the Chef's Kitchen - Chocolate Challenge | No |
| February 9 | Regis Philbin & Kelly Ripa | Yes | Rosario Dawson, Project Ack Ack, and Inside the Chef's Kitchen - Chocolate Challenge | No |
| February 10 | Regis Philbin & Kelly Ripa | Yes | Jennifer Garner, Ruby Gettinger, Project Ack Ack and Inside the Chef's Kitchen - Chocolate Challenge | No |
| February 11 | Regis Philbin & Kelly Ripa | Yes | Kim Kardashian and Inside the Chef's Kitchen - Chocolate Challenge | No |
| February 12 | Regis Philbin & Kelly Ripa | Yes | Jessica Biel, Inside the Chef's Kitchen - Chocolate Challenge, and Fitness Friday | No |
| February 15 | Regis Philbin & Kelly Ripa | Yes | Reggie Bush, Taye Diggs, Corbin Bleu, Project Ack Ack, and Regis & Kelly's Crash Course | No |
| February 16 | Regis Philbin & Kelly Ripa | Yes | Nicole Richie, Regis & Kelly's Crash Course, and Daytona 500 Winner | No |
| February 17 | Regis Philbin & Kelly Ripa | Yes | Lauren Fix, Michelle Williams, Christoph Waltz, and Regis & Kelly's Crash Course | Yes |
| February 18 | Regis Philbin & Kelly Ripa | Yes | Sir Ben Kingsley, Shenae Grimes, and Regis & Kelly's Crash Course | No |
| February 19 | Regis Philbin & Kelly Ripa | Yes | Ewan McGregor, Regis & Kelly's Crash Course, and Fitness Friday | No |
| February 22 | Regis Philbin & Kelly Ripa | Yes | Ethan Hawke, Shaun White, and Coast to Coast Makeovers | No |
| February 23 | Regis Philbin & Kelly Ripa | Yes | Diane Sawyer and Coast to Coast Makeovers | Yes |
| February 24 | Regis Philbin & Kelly Ripa | Yes | Jeffrey Donovan, Joan Rivers, and Coast to Coast Makeovers | No |
| February 25 | Regis Philbin & Kelly Ripa | Yes | Bruce Willis and Coast to Coast Makeovers | Yes |
| February 26 | Regis Philbin & Kelly Ripa | Yes | Maggie Gyllenhaal, Coast to Coast Makeovers, and Fitness Friday | No |

=== March 2010 ===
| Date | Co-Hosts | "Host Chat" | Guests/Segments | "Regis and Kelly Inbox" |
|---|---|---|---|---|
| March 1 | Regis Philbin & Kelly Ripa | Yes | Chris O'Donnell, Carrie Ann Inaba, and Beautiful Baby Week | Yes |
| March 2 | Regis Philbin & Kelly Ripa | Yes | Jake Pavelka, Johnny Weir and Beautiful Baby Week | No |
| March 3 | Regis Philbin & Kelly Ripa | Yes | Heidi Klum, Jeff Garlin, Corinne Bailey Rae, and Beautiful Baby Week | Yes |
| March 4 | Regis Philbin & Kelly Ripa | Yes | Tom Hanks, Tom Brokaw, and Beautiful Baby Week | No |
| March 5 | Kelly Ripa & Anderson Cooper | Yes | Apolo Ohno, Beautiful Baby Week, John Walsh, Fitness Friday | No |
| March 8 | Kelly Ripa & Mark Consuelos | Yes | Chace Crawford and Jason & Molly | Yes |
| March 9 | Kelly Ripa & Andy Richter | Yes | Chelsea Handler, James Spader, and Chris Byrne the Toy Guy | Yes |
| March 10 | Kelly Ripa & Ludacris | Yes | America Ferrera and Bret Michaels | No |
| March 11 | Kelly Ripa & Jerry Seinfeld | Yes | Donald Trump and Peter Gros | No |
| March 12 | Kelly Ripa & Anderson Cooper | Yes | Guy Fieri, Ted Danson and Fitness Friday | Yes |
| March 15 | Regis Philbin & Kelly Ripa | Yes | Jennifer Aniston and The Script | No |
| March 16 | Regis Philbin & Kelly Ripa | Yes | Kristen Stewart and Kirstie Alley | Yes |
| March 17 | Regis Philbin & Kelly Ripa | Yes | Jude Law, Mindy Kaling, and Celtic Woman | No |
| March 18 | Regis Philbin & Kelly Ripa | Yes | Gerard Butler and Toni Collette | No |
| March 19 | Kelly Ripa & Kyle MacLachlan | Yes | Edie Falco, Joseph Fiennes and Fitness Friday | Yes |
| March 29 | Regis Philbin & Kara DioGuardi | Yes | Kelsey Grammer, New York Auto Show Week | Yes |
| March 30 | Regis Philbin & Joy Philbin | Yes | Jeff Goldblum, Daughtry, New York Auto Show Week | Yes |
| March 31 | Regis Philbin & Cat Deeley | Yes | Tyler Perry, Barenaked Ladies, New York Auto Show Week | Yes |

=== April 2010 ===
| Date | Co-Hosts | "Host Chat" | Guests/Segments | "Regis and Kelly Inbox" |
|---|---|---|---|---|
| April 1 | Regis Philbin & Carrie Ann Inaba | Yes | Janet Jackson, Dancing with the Stars castoffs Shannen Doherty & Mark Ballas, New York Auto Show Week | Yes |
| April 2 | Regis Philbin & Carrie Ann Inaba | Yes | Donald Trump, Mario Lopez, New York Auto Show Week, Fitness Friday | No |
| April 5 | Regis Philbin & Kelly Ripa | Yes | Tori Spelling & Dean McDermott, Peter Krause, David Gray | No |
| April 6 | Regis Philbin & Kelly Ripa | Yes | Carol Burnett, Michael Kors, Ringling Brothers Circus | No |
| April 7 | Regis Philbin & Kelly Ripa | Yes | Tina Fey & Andie MacDowell | Yes |
| April 8 | Kelly Ripa & Bruno Tonioli | Yes | Steve Carell, Dancing with the Stars castoffs Buzz Aldrin & Ashly Costa | Yes |
| April 9 | Regis Philbin & Kelly Ripa | Yes | Anthony LaPaglia, Prom dresses, Fitness Friday | Yes |
| April 12 | Regis Philbin & Kelly Ripa | Yes | Megan Mullally, Jane Lynch, CC Sabathia | No |
| April 13 | Regis Philbin & Kelly Ripa | Yes | Michael J. Fox, Seth Meyers | Yes |
| April 14 | Regis Philbin & Kelly Ripa | Yes | Demi Moore, Hilary Duff | Yes |
| April 15 | Regis Philbin & Kelly Ripa | Yes | Chris Rock, Dancing with the Stars castoffs Aiden Turner & Edyta Śliwińska | No |
| April 16 | Kelly Ripa & Nathan Lane | Yes | Tracy Morgan, three Project Runway finalists, Fitness Friday | No |
| April 19 | Regis Philbin & Kelly Ripa | Yes | Sharon Osbourne, Train, Spring Into Gardening Week | No |
| April 20 | Regis Philbin & Kelly Ripa | Yes | Jennifer Lopez, Sarah Silverman, Spring Into Gardening Week | Yes |
| April 21 | Regis Philbin & Kelly Ripa | Yes | Susan Sarandon, Spring Into Gardening Week | Yes |
| April 22 | Regis Philbin & Kelly Ripa | Yes | Zoe Saldaña, Dancing with the Stars castoffs Kate Gosselin & Tony Dovolani, Spring into Gardening Week | No |
| April 23 | Kelly Ripa & Anderson Cooper | Yes | Drew Brees, Project Runway winner, Spring into Gardening Week, Fitness Friday | No |
| April 26 | Regis Philbin & Kelly Ripa | Yes | Kristin Cavallari, Broadway Week | No |
| April 27 | Regis Philbin & Kelly Ripa | Yes | Molly Ringwald, Brooke Shields, Broadway Week | Yes |
| April 28 | Regis Philbin & Kelly Ripa | Yes | The Real Housewives of New Jersey, Broadway Week | No |
| April 29 | Regis Philbin & Kelly Ripa | Yes | Robert Downey Jr., Dancing with the Stars castoffs Jake Pavelka & Chelsie Hightower, Broadway Week | No |
| April 30 | Regis Philbin & Kelly Ripa | Yes | David Letterman, Regis and Michael Strahan babysit Kelly's kids, Broadway Week, Fitness Friday | No |

=== May 2010 ===
| Date | Co-Hosts | "Host Chat" | Guests/Segments | "Regis and Kelly Inbox" |
|---|---|---|---|---|
| May 3 | Regis Philbin & Kelly Ripa | Yes | Betty White, Michael Weatherly, Halfway to Halloween Week | No |
| May 4 | Regis Philbin & Kelly Ripa | Yes | Damon Wayans, Halfway to Halloween Week | No |
| May 5 | Regis Philbin & Kelly Ripa | Yes | Tom Selleck, Joanna Philbin, Halfway to Halloween Week | No |
| May 6 | Regis Philbin & Kelly Ripa | Yes | Joel McHale, Dancing with the Stars castoffs Pamela Anderson & Damian Whitewood, Halfway to Halloween Week | Yes |
| May 7 | Regis Philbin & Kelly Ripa | Yes | Russell Crowe, Mario Lopez, Halfway to Halloween Week, Fitness Friday | No |
| May 10 | Regis Philbin & Kelly Ripa | Yes | Denzel Washington, New Mom Makeovers Week | No |
| May 11 | Regis Philbin & Kelly Ripa | Yes | Lucy Liu, New Mom Makeovers Week | Yes |
| May 12 | Regis Philbin & Kelly Ripa | Yes | Queen Latifah, Beth Ostrosky Stern, New Mom Makeovers Week | No |
| May 13 | Regis Philbin & Kelly Ripa | Yes | Teri Hatcher, Dancing with the Stars castoffs Niecy Nash & Louis van Amstel, New Mom Makeovers Week | No |
| May 14 | Regis Philbin & Kelly Ripa | Yes | Amanda Seyfried, America's Next Top Model winner, New Mom Makeovers Week, Fitness Friday | No |
| May 17 | Regis Philbin & Kelly Ripa | Yes | Jimmy Kimmel, Survivor: Heroes vs. Villains winner, Top Teacher Week | Yes |
| May 18 | Regis Philbin & Kelly Ripa | Yes | Matthew Fox, Matthew Morrison, Top Teacher Week | No |
| May 19 | Regis Philbin & Kelly Ripa | Yes | Ashton Kutcher, Miss USA, Top Teacher Week | No |
| May 20 | Regis Philbin & Kelly Ripa | Yes | Mike Myers, Dancing with the Stars castoffs Chad Ochocinco & Cheryl Burke, Top Teacher Week | No |
| May 21 | Regis Philbin & Kelly Ripa | Yes | Cameron Diaz, Top Teacher Week, Fitness Friday | No |
| May 24 | Regis Philbin & Kelly Ripa | Yes | Kim Cattrall, Bret Michaels | No |
| May 25 | Regis Philbin & Kelly Ripa | Yes | Jonas Brothers, Cynthia Nixon, Jewel | No |
| May 26 | Regis Philbin & Kelly Ripa | Yes | Jake Gyllenhaal, Dancing with the Stars champions Nicole Scherzinger & Derek Hough, Biggest Loser winner | No |
| May 27 | Regis Philbin & Kelly Ripa | Yes | Sarah Jessica Parker, Dancing with the Stars runners-up Evan Lysacek & Anna Trebunskaya, Dancing with the Stars castoffs Erin Andrews & Maksim Chmerkovskiy | No |
| May 28 | Kelly Ripa & Anderson Cooper | Yes | Kristin Davis, Fitness Friday, Coast-to-Coast Firehouse Cook-Off | No |
| May 31 | Regis Philbin & Kelly Ripa | Yes | Kim Kardashian, Jonah Hill, Keane | Yes |

=== June 2010 ===
| Date | Co-Hosts | "Host Chat" | Guests/Segments | "Regis and Kelly Inbox" |
|---|---|---|---|---|
| June 1 | Regis Philbin & Kelly Ripa | Yes | Chris Noth, American Idol winner Lee DeWyze | No |
| June 2 | Regis Philbin & Kelly Ripa | Yes | Mark Feuerstein, American Idol runner-up Crystal Bowersox | Yes |
| June 3 | Regis Philbin & Kelly Ripa | Yes | Demi Lovato, Carrot Top, Taio Cruz | No |
| June 4 | Regis Philbin & Kelly Ripa | Yes | Katherine Heigl, John Corbett, Coast-to-Coast Firehouse Cook-Off | No |
| June 7 | Kelly Ripa & Neil Patrick Harris | Yes | Molly Shannon, winner of Scripps National Spelling Bee | No |
| June 8 | Kelly Ripa & Emeril Lagasse | Yes | Jessica Biel, Chris Byrne the Toy Guy | Yes |
| June 9 | Kelly Ripa & Jerry Seinfeld | Yes | Liam Neeson, Kourtney & Khloé Kardashian | No |
| June 10 | Kelly Ripa & Mark Consuelos | Yes | Bradley Cooper, Christina Aguilera, Coast-to-Coast Firehouse Cook-Off | No |
| June 14 | Regis Philbin & Kelly Ripa | Yes | Sofía Vergara, Henry Winkler, Sarah McLachlan, Matthew Benson shares tips for growing an Upside-down garden. | Yes |
| June 15 | Regis Philbin & Joy Philbin | Yes | Lea Michele, Jillian Michaels | No |
| June 16 | Regis Philbin & Carrie Ann Inaba | Yes | Lisa Kudrow, David James Elliott, Charice Pempengco | No |
| June 17 | Regis Philbin & Jane Krakowski | Yes | Jason Lee, Audrina Patridge | Yes |
| June 18 | Regis Philbin & Joy Philbin | Yes | Miley Cyrus, Devo, Coast-to-Coast Firehouse Cook-Off | No |
| June 22 | Regis Philbin & Lucy Liu | Yes | Salma Hayek Pinault, Padma Lakshmi | No |
| June 23 | Regis Philbin & Joy Philbin | Yes | Tom Cruise, Miranda Cosgrove | No |
| June 24 | Regis Philbin & Kristin Chenoweth | Yes | Adam Sandler, Cyndi Lauper | Yes |
| June 25 | Regis Philbin & Bernadette Peters | Yes | Cameron Diaz, Coast-to-Coast Firehouse Cook-Off | No |
| June 28 | Kelly Ripa & Mark Consuelos | Yes | Taylor Lautner, Michael Vartan | Yes |
| June 29 | Regis Philbin & Kelly Ripa | Yes | Kristen Stewart, Rob Schneider | No |
| June 30 | Regis Philbin & Kelly Ripa | Yes | Dolly Parton, Landon Donovan, Vern Yip | No |

=== July 2010 ===
| Date | Co-Hosts | "Host Chat" | Guests/Segments | "Regis and Kelly Inbox" |
|---|---|---|---|---|
| July 1 | Regis Philbin & Kelly Ripa | Yes | Dev Patel, Zach Braff | Yes |
| July 2 | Regis Philbin & Kelly Ripa | Yes | Blair Underwood, Coast-to-Coast Firehouse Cook-Off | No |
| July 5 | Regis Philbin & Kelly Ripa | Yes | Denis Leary, Hutch Dano, Summer School Week | No |
| July 6 | Regis Philbin & Kelly Ripa | Yes | Nikki Reed, Julianne Moore, Summer School Week | No |
| July 7 | Regis Philbin & Kelly Ripa | Yes | Bryce Dallas Howard, Russell Brand, Summer School Week | No |
| July 8 | Regis Philbin & Kelly Ripa | Yes | Steve Carell, Squeeze, Summer School Week | No |
| July 9 | Regis Philbin & Kelly Ripa | Yes | Jason Segel, Lamar & Khloé Odom, Summer School Week, Coast-to-Coast Firehouse Cook-Off | No |
| July 12 | Regis Philbin & Kelly Ripa | Yes | LIVE! in Prince Edward Island, Peter Facinelli, Lady Antebellum, Kelly goes horseback riding around PEI with Carson Kressley | No |
| July 13 | Regis Philbin & Kelly Ripa | Yes | LIVE! in Prince Edward Island, Harry Hamlin & Lisa Rinna, Caroline Rhea, Kelly Anne of Green Gables with Mark Consuelos, Michael Gelman & Art Moore | No |
| July 14 | Regis Philbin & Kelly Ripa | Yes | LIVE! in Prince Edward Island, Stephen Moyer, Melanie Fiona, Regis becomes a fisherman for a day on the magnificent province of PEI | Yes |
| July 15 | Regis Philbin & Kelly Ripa | Yes | LIVE! in Prince Edward Island, John Corbett, Elisha Cuthbert, OneRepublic, Regis throws a beach bash clambake | No |
| July 16 | Regis Philbin & Kelly Ripa | Yes | Nicolas Cage, Jersey Shore cast, Coast-to-Coast Firehouse Cook-Off | No |
| July 19 | Regis Philbin & Kelly Ripa | Yes | Paul Rudd, Enrique Iglesias, Get Wiggy With It: Summer Hair Week | Yes |
| July 20 | Regis Philbin & Kelly Ripa | Yes | Robert Duvall, Get Wiggy With It: Summer Hair Week | Yes |
| July 21 | Regis Philbin & Kelly Ripa | Yes | Kevin Connolly, Blue Man Group, Get Wiggy With It: Summer Hair Week | No |
| July 22 | Regis Philbin & Kelly Ripa | Yes | January Jones, Dennis Haysbert, Get Wiggy With It: Summer Hair Week | No |
| July 23 | Regis Philbin & Kelly Ripa | Yes | John O'Hurley, Get Wiggy With It: Summer Hair Week, Coast-to-Coast Firehouse Cook-Off | No |
| July 26 | Regis Philbin & Kelly Ripa | Yes | Anne Heche, Matt Bomer | Yes |
| July 27 | Regis Philbin & Kelly Ripa | Yes | Zac Efron, Cybill Shepherd | Yes |
| July 28 | Regis Philbin & Kelly Ripa | Yes | Heidi Klum, Wilmer Valderrama | Yes |
| July 29 | Regis Philbin & Kelly Ripa | Yes | Michael Keaton, Ann-Margret | Yes |
| July 30 | Regis Philbin & Kelly Ripa | Yes | Kevin Kline, 3OH!3, Coast-to-Coast Firehouse Cook-Off | No |

=== August 2010 ===
| Date | Co-Hosts | "Host Chat" | Guests/Segments | "Regis and Kelly Inbox" |
|---|---|---|---|---|
| August 2 | Kelly Ripa & Piers Morgan | Yes | Eva Mendes, Rachel Zoe, Doggie Do's and Don'ts Week | No |
| August 3 | Regis Philbin & Kelly Ripa | Yes | Cat Deeley, Mike Posner, Doggie Do's and Don'ts Week | No |
| August 4 | Regis Philbin & Kelly Ripa | Yes | Will Ferrell, Doggie Do's and Don'ts Week | Yes |
| August 5 | Regis Philbin & Kelly Ripa | Yes | Christiane Amanpour, The Bachelorette, Doggie Do's and Don'ts Week | No |
| August 6 | Regis Philbin & Kelly Ripa | Yes | Dylan McDermott, Doggie Do's and Don'ts Week, Coast-to-Coast Firehouse Cook-Off | No |
| August 9 | Kelly Ripa & Anderson Cooper | Yes | Julia Roberts, Buddy Valastro | No |
| August 10 | Regis Philbin & Kelly Ripa | Yes | Sylvester Stallone, Gabourey Sidibe | Yes |
| August 11 | Regis Philbin & Kelly Ripa | Yes | Anthony Edwards, Jessica Szohr | Yes |
| August 12 | Regis Philbin & Kelly Ripa | Yes | Jason Bateman, Chris Bosh | No |
| August 13 | Regis Philbin & Kelly Ripa | Yes | Jimmy Fallon, Sara Rue, Coast-to-Coast Firehouse Cook-Off | No |
| August 16 | Regis Philbin & Kelly Ripa | Yes | Jonah Hill, Jane Lynch and Sarah McLachlan | No |
| August 17 | Regis Philbin & Shannon Murphy | Yes | Emma Thompson, Joey Lawrence, winner of So You Think You Can Dance | Yes |
| August 18 | Regis Philbin & Jayde Donovan | Yes | Maggie Gyllenhaal, Yo Gabba Gabba!, Hat Trends | No |
| August 19 | Regis Philbin & Kristin Cruz | Yes | Jennifer Aniston, Kyle MacLachlan, Jordin Sparks | No |
| August 20 | Regis Philbin & Jenn Hobby | Yes | Hayden Christensen, Melissa Joan Hart, Coast-to-Coast Firehouse Cook-Off | No |

== Season 23 (2010–2011) ==
=== September 2010 ===
| Date | Co-Hosts | "Host Chat" | Guests/Segments | "Regis and Kelly Inbox" |
|---|---|---|---|---|
| September 6 | Regis Philbin & Kelly Ripa | Yes | Laura Linney, Bethenny Frankel, Train | Yes |
| September 7 | Regis Philbin & Kelly Ripa | Yes | Katie Holmes, Tim Gunn | No |
| September 8 | Regis Philbin & Kelly Ripa | Yes | Philip Seymour Hoffman, Ashley Tisdale, Sara Bareilles | Yes |
| September 9 | Regis Philbin & Kelly Ripa | Yes | David Boreanaz, Fantasia Barrino | No |
| September 10 | Kelly Ripa & Anderson Cooper | Yes | Kate Gosselin, Dara Torres | Yes |
| September 13 | Regis Philbin & Kelly Ripa | Yes | Donald Trump, Steve Buscemi, Guinness World Record Breaker Week | No |
| September 14 | Regis Philbin & Kelly Ripa | Yes | Blake Lively, Will Arnett, Guinness World Record Breaker Week | No |
| September 15 | Regis Philbin & Kelly Ripa | Yes | Ben Affleck, Meredith Vieira, Guinness World Record Breaker Week | Yes |
| September 16 | Regis Philbin & Kelly Ripa | Yes | Jon Hamm, Rachael Ray, Guinness World Record Breaker Week | No |
| September 17 | Kelly Ripa & Anderson Cooper | Yes | Josh Brolin, Carey Mulligan, Guinness World Record Breaker Week | No |
| September 20 | Regis Philbin & Kelly Ripa | Yes | Julianna Margulies, Sofia Vergara, Cory Monteith | No |
| September 21 | Regis Philbin & Kelly Ripa | Yes | Shia LaBeouf, James Belushi | No |
| September 22 | Regis Philbin & Kelly Ripa | Yes | LIVE's High Heel-a-thon, Kristin Chenoweth, AnnaLynne McCord | No |
| September 23 | Regis Philbin & Kelly Ripa | Yes | Judy Sheindlin, Amy Poehler | No |
| September 24 | Kelly Ripa & Bryant Gumbel | Yes | Susan Sarandon, Tom Selleck | No |
| September 27 | Regis Philbin & Kelly Ripa | Yes | Katherine Heigl, Victoria Justice, Perfect Fit Week | Yes |
| September 28 | Regis Philbin & Kelly Ripa | Yes | Michael Chiklis, Michael C. Hall, Perfect Fit Week | No |
| September 29 | Regis Philbin & Kelly Ripa | Yes | Vanessa Williams and Perfect Fit Week | Yes |
| September 30 | Regis Philbin & Kelly Ripa | Yes | Simon Baker, Jason Derulo, Perfect Fit Week | Yes |

=== October 2010 ===
| Date | Co-Hosts | "Host Chat" | Guests/Segments | "Regis and Kelly Inbox" |
|---|---|---|---|---|
| October 1 | Kelly Ripa & Michael Strahan | Yes | Sally Field, Perfect Fit Week | Yes |
| October 4 | Regis Philbin & Kelly Ripa | Yes | Jennifer Hudson, Blair Underwood | Yes |
| October 5 | Regis Philbin & Kelly Ripa | Yes | Bruce Willis, Michael Imperioli | Yes |
| October 6 | Regis Philbin & Kelly Ripa | Yes | Diane Lane, David Archuleta | Yes |
| October 7 | Regis Philbin & Kelly Ripa | Yes | Melina Kanakaredes, Michael Kors | Yes |
| October 8 | Kelly Ripa & Guy Fieri | Yes | Mary-Louise Parker, Emma Roberts | Yes |
| October 11 | Regis Philbin & Kelly Ripa | Yes | Helen Mirren, Lauren Conrad, Nicki Minaj & will.i.am | No |
| October 12 | Regis Philbin & Kelly Ripa | Yes | Condoleezza Rice, Hilary Duff | Yes |
| October 13 | Regis Philbin & Kelly Ripa | Yes | Morgan Freeman, Ivanka Trump | Yes |
| October 14 | Regis Philbin & Kelly Ripa | Yes | Hilary Swank, James Earl Jones | Yes |
| October 15 | Kelly Ripa & Mark Consuelos | Yes | Richard Dreyfuss, Elisabeth Moss | Yes |
| October 18 | Regis Philbin & Kelly Ripa | Yes | Keri Russell, Nicole Polizzi & Jenni Farley | Yes |
| October 19 | Regis Philbin & Kelly Ripa | Yes | Kristen Stewart, Jesse McCartney, Pee-Wee Herman | No |
| October 20 | Regis Philbin & Kelly Ripa | Yes | Chris Meloni, Maggie Q, Plain White T's | Yes |
| October 21 | Regis Philbin & Kelly Ripa | Yes | Jim Parsons, Judith Light, Dierks Bentley | No |
| October 22 | Kelly Ripa & Shaun White | Yes | Cynthia Nixon, Juliette Lewis | No |
| October 25 | Regis Philbin & Kelly Ripa | Yes | Michael Caine, Ed Westwick, Halloween Week | No |
| October 26 | Regis Philbin & Kelly Ripa | Yes | Teri Hatcher, Halloween Week | Yes |
| October 27 | Regis Philbin & Kelly Ripa | Yes | David Arquette, Taylor Swift, Halloween Week | No |
| October 28 | Regis Philbin & Kelly Ripa | Yes | Jimmy Smits, Seal, Halloween Week | Yes |
| October 29 | Regis Philbin & Kelly Ripa | Yes | LIVE's Halloween Bites Again: Chomped from the Headlines Spectacular, Will Ferrell | No |

=== November 2010 ===
| Date | Co-Hosts | "Host Chat" | Guests/Segments | "Regis and Kelly Inbox" |
|---|---|---|---|---|
| November 1 | Regis Philbin & Kelly Ripa | Yes | Jonah Hill, the winner of Project Runway, Thanksgiving with a Twist Week | Yes |
| November 2 | Regis Philbin & Kelly Ripa | Yes | Robert Downey Jr., Robin Roberts, Thanksgiving with a Twist Week | Yes |
| November 3 | Regis Philbin & Kelly Ripa | Yes | Rosario Dawson, Jason Schwartzman, Thanksgiving with a Twist Week | No |
| November 4 | Regis Philbin & Kelly Ripa | Yes | Tina Fey, Neon Trees, Thanksgiving with a Twist Week | Yes |
| November 5 | Regis Philbin & Kelly Ripa | Yes | Jo Frost, Jesse Tyler Ferguson, Thanksgiving with a Twist Week | Yes |
| November 8 | Regis Philbin & Kelly Ripa | Yes | Rachel McAdams, Jason Ritter, BFF Dream Team Makeover Week | No |
| November 9 | Regis Philbin & Kelly Ripa | Yes | Harrison Ford, Olivia Wilde, BFF Dream Team Makeover Week | No |
| November 10 | Regis Philbin & Kelly Ripa | Yes | Denzel Washington, Rainn Wilson, BFF Dream Team Makeover Week | No |
| November 11 | Regis Philbin & Kelly Ripa | Yes | Russell Crowe, Ty Burrell, BFF Dream Team Makeover Week | No |
| November 12 | Regis Philbin & Kelly Ripa | Yes | Tracy Morgan, BFF Dream Team Makeover Week | Yes |
| November 15 | Regis Philbin & Kelly Ripa | Yes | Russell Brand, Rupert Grint | Yes |
| November 16 | Regis Philbin & Kelly Ripa | Yes | Anne Hathaway, Emma Watson, Lee DeWyze | No |
| November 17 | Regis Philbin & Kelly Ripa | Yes | Daniel Radcliffe, Chris Byrne the Toy Guy | No |
| November 18 | Regis Philbin & Kelly Ripa | Yes | Jake Gyllenhaal, Anderson Cooper, Mark Sanchez | No |
| November 19 | Regis Philbin & Kelly Ripa | Yes | Cher, Mandy Moore | No |
| November 22 | Regis Philbin & Kelly Ripa | Yes | Steve Martin, Scott Caan, Sarah McLachlan | No |
| November 23 | Regis Philbin & Kelly Ripa | Yes | Jessica Simpson, Cloris Leachman | Yes |
| November 24 | Regis Philbin & Kelly Ripa | Yes | Colin Firth, Elton John & Leon Russell | No |
| November 26 | Regis Philbin & Kelly Ripa | Yes | Billy Bob Thornton, Paul Shaffer | Yes |
| November 29 | Regis Philbin & Kelly Ripa | Yes | LIVE! in Las Vegas, Jabbawockeez, Joel McHale, David Copperfield, Nicki Minaj, Regis remembers classic Las Vegas and shares highlights of present Las Vegas | No |
| November 30 | Regis Philbin & Kelly Ripa | Yes | LIVE! in Las Vegas, Jersey Boys, Jimmy Kimmel, Cheryl Burke & Derek Hough, Kelly attempts to perform in Cirque du Soleil's Kà | No |

=== December 2010 ===
| Date | Co-Hosts | "Host Chat" | Guests/Segments | "Regis and Kelly Inbox" |
|---|---|---|---|---|
| December 1 | Regis Philbin & Kelly Ripa | Yes | LIVE! in Las Vegas, Blue Man Group, Selena Gomez, Terry Fator, Regis wakes from his own Vegas hangover | No |
| December 2 | Regis Philbin & Kelly Ripa | Yes | LIVE! in Las Vegas, Jubilee Showgirls, Howie Mandel, Rod Stewart, See what happens on Kelly's Vegas-style girls night out! | No |
| December 6 | Regis Philbin & Kelly Ripa | Yes | Ray Romano, Alyssa Milano, Perfect Holiday Gift Week | No |
| December 7 | Regis Philbin & Kelly Ripa | Yes | James Franco, Daniel Dae Kim, Perfect Holiday Gift Week | No |
| December 8 | Regis Philbin & Kelly Ripa | Yes | Amy Adams, Natasha Bedingfield, Perfect Holiday Gift Week | No |
| December 9 | Regis Philbin & Kelly Ripa | Yes | Owen Wilson, Lucy Liu, Perfect Holiday Gift Week | Yes |
| December 10 | Kelly Ripa & Nick Lachey | Yes | Aaron Eckhart, Mike Sorrentino, Perfect Holiday Gift Week | No |
| December 13 | Regis Philbin & Kelly Ripa | Yes | Jessica Alba, Ice-T, Crystal Bowersox | Yes |
| December 14 | Regis Philbin & Kelly Ripa | Yes | Jeff Bridges, Ricky Gervais, Annie Lennox | Yes |
| December 15 | Regis Philbin & Kelly Ripa | Yes | Paul Rudd, Biggest Loser winner | Yes |
| December 16 | Regis Philbin & Kelly Ripa | Yes | Reese Witherspoon, Teri Polo | Yes |
| December 17 | Regis Philbin & Kelly Ripa | Yes | Robert De Niro, Michael Eisner | Yes |
| December 20 | Regis Philbin & Kelly Ripa | Yes | Ben Stiller | Yes |
| December 21 | Regis Philbin & Kelly Ripa | Yes | LIVE's Holiday Skating Party, Bette Midler, Katharine McPhee, Disney On Ice | No |
| December 22 | Regis Philbin & Kelly Ripa | No | LIVE's Holiday Flashback Special: Raiding the Live Vault | No |
| December 31 | Regis Philbin & Kelly Ripa | Yes | 2010 Farewell Special: A Year In Review | No |

=== January 2011 ===
| Date | Co-Hosts | "Host Chat" | Guests/Segments | "Regis and Kelly Inbox" |
|---|---|---|---|---|
| January 3 | Regis Philbin & Kelly Ripa | Yes | Michelle Williams, Brad Womack, Happy New You Week | No |
| January 4 | Regis Philbin & Kelly Ripa | Yes | Gwyneth Paltrow, Paula Abdul, Happy New You Week | No |
| January 5 | Regis Philbin & Kelly Ripa | Yes | Kevin Spacey, Happy New You Week | Yes |
| January 6 | Regis Philbin & Kelly Ripa | Yes | Roseanne Barr; Ronnie Ortiz-Magro, Paul DelVecchio & Vinny Guadagnino, Happy New You Week | No |
| January 7 | Kelly Ripa & Neil Patrick Harris | Yes | Matt LeBlanc, Garrett Hedlund, Happy New You Week | Yes |
| January 10 | Regis Philbin & Kelly Ripa | Yes | Seth Meyers, Suzanne Somers, Jennifer Connelly | Yes |
| January 11 | Regis Philbin & Kelly Ripa | Yes | Seth Rogen, Leighton Meester | Yes |
| January 12 | Regis Philbin & Kelly Ripa | Yes | Vince Vaughn, Minnie Driver | Yes |
| January 13 | Regis Philbin & Kelly Ripa | Yes | Kevin James, Patti Stanger | Yes |
| January 14 | Kelly Ripa & Randy Jackson | Yes | George Stephanopoulos, Ginnifer Goodwin | Yes |
| January 17 | Regis Philbin & Kelly Ripa | Yes | David Duchovny, Kathy Bates | Yes |
| January 18 | Regis Philbin & Kelly Ripa | Yes | Steven Tyler, Angie Dickinson, Leo Laporte gives Regis and Kelly a tech lesson with the coolest gadgets | Yes |
| January 19 | Regis Philbin & Kelly Ripa | Yes | Kourtney & Kim Kardashian, Joan & Melissa Rivers, The Script | No |
| January 20 | Regis Philbin & Kelly Ripa | Yes | Martin Short, Olivia Munn | Yes |
| January 21 | Kelly Ripa & Ashton Kutcher | Yes | Jason Statham, Buddy Valastro | Yes |
| January 24 | Kelly Ripa & Cory Fitzner | Yes | Anthony Hopkins | Yes |
| January 25 | Kelly Ripa & Jeff Mauler | Yes | Alan Cumming | Yes |
| January 26 | Kelly Ripa & Bobby Bones | Yes | Kyle Richards, Rico Rodriguez | Yes |
| January 27 | Kelly Ripa & Eric Ferguson | Yes | Kelsey Grammer, Mark Feuerstein | Yes |
| January 28 | Kelly Ripa & Mike Catherwood | Yes | Brooke Shields, Bryan Adams | Yes |
| January 31 | Regis Philbin & Joy Philbin | Yes | Barbara Walters, Johnny Galecki, Twitter Week | Yes |

=== February 2011 ===
| Date | Co-Hosts | "Host Chat" | Guests/Segments | "Regis and Kelly Inbox" |
|---|---|---|---|---|
| February 1 | Regis Philbin & Kelly Ripa | Yes | Lisa Kudrow, Brooke Burke, Twitter Week | Yes |
| February 2 | Regis Philbin & Kelly Ripa | Yes | Julianne Hough, Minka Kelly, Larry the Cable Guy, Twitter Week | Yes |
| February 3 | Regis Philbin & Kelly Ripa | Yes | Justin Bieber, Twitter Week | Yes |
| February 4 | Regis Philbin & Kelly Ripa | Yes | Bill Paxton, Annette Bening, Twitter Week | No |
| February 7 | Regis Philbin & Kelly Ripa | Yes | Matthew Perry, Chris Colfer, Char Margolis, Regis and Kelly's 10th Anniversary Week | No |
| February 8 | Regis Philbin & Kelly Ripa | Yes | Martin Lawrence, Donald Trump, Regis and Kelly's 10th Anniversary Week | No |
| February 9 | Regis Philbin & Kelly Ripa | Yes | Michelle Obama, David Letterman, Regis and Kelly's 10th Anniversary Week | Yes |
| February 10 | Regis Philbin & Kelly Ripa | Yes | Elton John, Jerry Seinfeld, Regis and Kelly's 10th Anniversary Week | No |
| February 11 | Regis Philbin & Kelly Ripa | Yes | Adam Sandler, Anderson Cooper, Regis and Kelly's 10th Anniversary Week | No |
| February 14 | Regis Philbin & Kelly Ripa | Yes | Michael Caine, Diane Kruger, World's Greatest Love Story Week | No |
| February 15 | Regis Philbin & Kelly Ripa | Yes | Jeff Probst, Josh Groban, World's Greatest Love Story Week | No |
| February 16 | Regis Philbin & Kelly Ripa | Yes | Forest Whitaker, Alex Trebek, World's Greatest Love Story Week | Yes |
| February 17 | Regis Philbin & Kelly Ripa | Yes | William H. Macy, World's Greatest Love Story Week | Yes |
| February 18 | Regis Philbin & Kelly Ripa | Yes | January Jones, World's Greatest Love Story Week | Yes |
| February 21 | Regis Philbin & Kelly Ripa | Yes | David Spade, Hayden Panettiere, Good Charlotte | No |
| February 22 | Regis Philbin & Kelly Ripa | Yes | Kiefer Sutherland, Betty White | No |
| February 23 | Regis Philbin & Kelly Ripa | Yes | Amy Poehler, Nicole Polizzi | No |
| February 24 | Regis Philbin & Kelly Ripa | Yes | Kim Cattrall, Jason Patric | No |
| February 25 | Regis Philbin & Kelly Ripa | Yes | Thomas Gibson, Regis and Kelly's Run Across America with Dean Karnazes begins | No |
| February 28 | Regis Philbin & Kelly Ripa | Yes | Emily Blunt, Topher Grace | No |

=== March 2011 ===
| Date | Co-Hosts | "Host Chat" | Guests/Segments | "Regis and Kelly Inbox" |
|---|---|---|---|---|
| March 1 | Regis Philbin & Kelly Ripa | Yes | Isla Fisher, Matt Bomer | Yes |
| March 2 | Regis Philbin & Kelly Ripa | Yes | Donald Trump, Abigail Breslin | Yes |
| March 3 | Regis Philbin & Kelly Ripa | Yes | Vanessa Hudgens, Josh Radnor | No |
| March 4 | Kelly Ripa & Josh Groban | Yes | Heather Locklear, La Toya Jackson | Yes |
| March 7 | Regis Philbin & Kelly Ripa | Yes | Matthew McConaughey, Darren Criss | No |
| March 8 | Regis Philbin & Kelly Ripa | Yes | Robin Williams, Peter Gros | No |
| March 9 | Regis Philbin & Kelly Ripa | Yes | Amanda Seyfried, Donnie Wahlberg | Yes |
| March 10 | Regis Philbin & Kelly Ripa | Yes | Jennifer Lopez, Miguel | Yes |
| March 11 | Kelly Ripa & Andy Cohen | Yes | Aaron Eckhart, John Leguizamo | No |
| March 14 | Regis Philbin & Kelly Ripa | Yes | Edie Falco, Matthew Morrison, American Idol castoff Ashthon Jones | No |
| March 15 | Regis Philbin & Kelly Ripa | Yes | Jason Bateman | Yes |
| March 16 | Regis Philbin & Kelly Ripa | Yes | Bradley Cooper, Jennifer Beals | No |
| March 17 | Regis Philbin & Kelly Ripa | Yes | Daniel Radcliffe, Bridget Moynahan | No |
| March 18 | Kelly Ripa & Michael Bublé | Yes | Paul Giamatti | No |
| March 28 | Regis Philbin & Joy Philbin | Yes | Sela Ward, Bindi Irwin, American Idol castoff Karen Rodriguez | Yes |
| March 29 | Regis Philbin & Lisa Rinna | Yes | Sara Ramirez, Susan Lucci | Yes |
| March 30 | Regis Philbin & Cat Deeley | Yes | James Marsden, Dana Delany | Yes |
| March 31 | Regis Philbin & Carrie Ann Inaba | Yes | Jake Gyllenhaal, Howie Mandel, Dancing with the Stars castoffs Mike Catherwood & Lacey Schwimmer | No |

=== April 2011 ===
| Date | Co-Hosts | "Host Chat" | Guests/Segments | "Regis and Kelly Inbox" |
|---|---|---|---|---|
| April 4 | Regis Philbin & Kelly Ripa | Yes | Chris Rock, American Idol castoffs Naima Adedapo & Thia Megia | No |
| April 5 | Regis Philbin & Kelly Ripa | Yes | Uma Thurman, Barbara Eden | No |
| April 6 | Regis Philbin & Kelly Ripa | Yes | Jennifer Garner, Jesse Tyler Ferguson, Caroline Kennedy | Yes |
| April 7 | Regis Philbin & Kelly Ripa | Yes | Jim Belushi, Ian Somerhalder, Dancing with the Stars castoffs Wendy Williams & Tony Dovolani | Yes |
| April 8 | Kelly Ripa & Russell Brand | Yes | Kristin Davis, Trudie Styler | Yes |
| April 11 | Regis Philbin & Kelly Ripa | Yes | Paul Reiser, Bridgit Mendler, American Idol castoff Pia Toscano | No |
| April 12 | Regis Philbin & Kelly Ripa | Yes | Bret Michaels, Elisha Cuthbert | Yes |
| April 13 | Regis Philbin & Kelly Ripa | Yes | Gwyneth Paltrow, John Larroquette | Yes |
| April 14 | Regis Philbin & Kelly Ripa | Yes | Courteney Cox, Amar'e Stoudemire, Dancing with the Stars castoffs Sugar Ray Leonard & Anna Trebunskaya | Yes |
| April 15 | Kelly Ripa & Mike Catherwood | Yes | David Arquette | Yes |
| April 18 | Kelly Ripa & Seth Meyers | Yes | Robert Pattinson, American Idol castoff Paul McDonald, New York Auto Show Week | No |
| April 19 | Kelly Ripa & Michael Strahan | Yes | Reese Witherspoon, New York Auto Show Week | Yes |
| April 20 | Kelly Ripa & Christian Slater | Yes | Ben Stiller, Christoph Waltz, New York Auto Show Week | Yes |
| April 21 | Kelly Ripa & Bruno Tonioli | Yes | Kathleen Turner, Dancing with the Stars castoffs Petra Němcová & Dmitry Chaplin, New York Auto Show Week | No |
| April 22 | Kelly Ripa & Josh Groban | Yes | Kirstie Alley, Olivia Wilde, New York Auto Show Week | Yes |
| April 25 | Regis Philbin & Mel B | Yes | Mark Ruffalo, American Idol castoff Stefano Langone, Royal Wedding Week | No |
| April 26 | Regis Philbin & Kelly Ripa | Yes | Kara DioGuardi, Royal Wedding Week | Yes |
| April 27 | Regis Philbin & Kelly Ripa | Yes | Orlando Bloom, Martha Plimpton, Royal Wedding Week | No |
| April 28 | Regis Philbin & Kelly Ripa | Yes | Alec Baldwin, Nina Dobrev, Dancing with the Stars castoffs, Royal Wedding Week | No |
| April 29 | Regis Philbin & Kelly Ripa | Yes | Eva La Rue, Finola Hughes, Royal Wedding Week | No |

=== May 2011 ===
| Date | Co-Hosts | "Host Chat" | Guests/Segments | "Regis and Kelly Inbox" |
|---|---|---|---|---|
| May 2 | Regis Philbin & Kelly Ripa | Yes | Eva Mendes, American Idol castoff Casey Abrams, Whiz Kids Week | Yes |
| May 3 | Regis Philbin & Kelly Ripa | Yes | Andy Samberg, Melissa McCarthy, Whiz Kids Week | No |
| May 4 | Regis Philbin & Kelly Ripa | Yes | John Krasinski, Maggie Q, Whiz Kids Week | No |
| May 5 | Regis Philbin & Kelly Ripa | Yes | Kate Hudson, Jennifer Hudson, Dancing with the Stars castoffs, Whiz Kids Week | No |
| May 6 | Regis Philbin & Kelly Ripa | Yes | Jodie Foster, Ginnifer Goodwin, Whiz Kids Week | No |
| May 9 | Regis Philbin & Kelly Ripa | Yes | Chelsea Handler, American Idol castoff Jacob Lusk, Top Teacher Week | No |
| May 10 | Regis Philbin & Kelly Ripa | Yes | Keira Knightley, Top Teacher Week, Regis and Kelly's Run Across America with Dean Karnazes ends | No |
| May 11 | Regis Philbin & Kelly Ripa | Yes | Patricia Heaton, Amazing Race winners, Top Teacher Week | No |
| May 12 | Regis Philbin & Kelly Ripa | Yes | Penélope Cruz, Chris Hemsworth, Top Teacher Week | Yes |
| May 13 | Regis Philbin & Kelly Ripa | Yes | Will Ferrell, Chris Colfer, Top Teacher Week | No |
| May 16 | Regis Philbin & Kelly Ripa | Yes | Jimmy Kimmel, Jane Lynch, American Idol castoff James Durbin | No |
| May 17 | Regis Philbin & Kelly Ripa | Yes | Chris O'Donnell, Tom Welling, Ellie Goulding | No |
| May 18 | Regis Philbin & Kelly Ripa | Yes | Eric Stonestreet, Survivor: Redemption Island winner, Matthew Morrison | Yes |
| May 19 | Regis Philbin & Kelly Ripa | Yes | Tom Selleck, Dancing with the Stars castoffs, Dream Home Giveaway winners, The Garrity's, are selected | No |
| May 20 | Regis Philbin & Kelly Ripa | Yes | Geoffrey Rush, Dream Home Giveaway family, The Garrity's, move into their new house | Yes |
| May 23 | Regis Philbin & Kelly Ripa | Yes | Jimmy Fallon, American Idol castoff Haley Reinhart, Winning Week featuring The Celebrity Apprentice | No |
| May 24 | Regis Philbin & Kelly Ripa | Yes | Jack Black, Julie Bowen, Winning Week featuring LIVE! Run Across America Watch to Win finalists | No |
| May 25 | Regis Philbin & Kelly Ripa | Yes | Lucy Liu, Winning Week featuring The Biggest Loser and Dancing with the Stars champions | Yes |
| May 26 | Regis Philbin & Kelly Ripa | Yes | Dancing with the Stars castoffs, Winning Week featuring National Geographic Bee champion | No |
| May 27 | Kelly Ripa & Pat Tomasulo | Yes | Heather Graham, Plain White T's, Winning Week featuring Top Chef: All Stars winner | No |
| May 30 | Regis Philbin & Kelly Ripa | Yes | Christina Aguilera, James McAvoy, Allstar Weekend, Miss USA contestants | No |

=== June 2011 ===
| Date | Co-Hosts | "Host Chat" | Guests/Segments | "Regis and Kelly Inbox" |
|---|---|---|---|---|
| June 1 | Regis Philbin & Kelly Ripa | Yes | Kevin Bacon, American Idol runner-up Lauren Alaina | No |
| June 2 | Regis Philbin & Kelly Ripa | Yes | Barbara Sinatra, American Idol winner Scotty McCreery | No |
| June 3 | Regis Philbin & Kelly Ripa | Yes | Ellen Barkin, Buddy Valastro | Yes |
| June 4 | Regis Philbin & Kelly Ripa | Yes | Ewan McGregor, Mike Rowe, Francis Anthony | No |
| June 6 | Kelly Ripa & Mark Consuelos | Yes | Kyle Chandler, Matt Bomer | Yes |
| June 7 | Regis Philbin & Kelly Ripa | Yes | Marc Anthony, Kourtney & Khloé Kardashian, Carl Edwards | No |
| June 8 | Regis Philbin & Kelly Ripa | Yes | Jim Parsons, Faith Ford, World Ocean Day | No |
| June 9 | Regis Philbin & Kelly Ripa | Yes | Carla Gugino, Natasha Bedingfield | No |
| June 10 | Regis Philbin & Kelly Ripa | Yes | Jason Lee, Jennifer Lawrence, Kenny Callaghan | Yes |
| June 13 | Regis Philbin & Joy Philbin | Yes | Angela Bassett, Emma Roberts | Yes |
| June 14 | Regis Philbin & Betty White | Yes | Blake Lively, Jeff Gordon, Jordin Sparks | Yes |
| June 15 | Regis Philbin & Kristin Chenoweth | Yes | Ryan Reynolds, Larry the Cable Guy | No |
| June 16 | Regis Philbin & Michelle Beadle | Yes | Jim Carrey, Michael Bolton | No |
| June 17 | Regis Philbin & Kara DioGuardi | Yes | Ryan & Tatum O'Neal, Carson Kressley | No |
| June 27 | Regis Philbin & Kelly Ripa | Yes | Patrick Dempsey, Mark Feuerstein, David Gray, Regis and Kelly win Daytime Emmy Awards | Yes |
| June 28 | Regis Philbin & Kelly Ripa | Yes | Selena Gomez, Rosie Huntington-Whiteley | No |
| June 29 | Regis Philbin & Kelly Ripa | Yes | Tom Hanks, Ken Jeong, David Cook | No |
| June 30 | Regis Philbin & Kelly Ripa | Yes | Shia LaBeouf, Jill Scott | Yes |

=== July 2011 ===
| Date | Co-Hosts | "Host Chat" | Guests/Segments | "Regis and Kelly Inbox" |
|---|---|---|---|---|
| July 1 | Regis Philbin & Kelly Ripa | Yes | Josh Duhamel, The Real Housewives of New Jersey, Andrew Carmellini | No |
| July 4 | Regis Philbin & Kelly Ripa | Yes | Rosario Dawson, Julie Andrews, Summer in the City Week | No |
| July 5 | Regis Philbin & Kelly Ripa | Yes | Kevin James, Rose Byrne, Summer in the City Week | No |
| July 6 | Regis Philbin & Kelly Ripa | Yes | Larry David, Bernadette Peters, Summer in the City Week | No |
| July 7 | Regis Philbin & Kelly Ripa | Yes | Jennifer Aniston, Rick Springfield, Summer in the City Week | No |
| July 8 | Regis Philbin & Kelly Ripa | Yes | Jason Bateman, Poppy Montgomery, Summer in the City Week | No |
| July 11 | Regis Philbin & Kelly Ripa | Yes | Kyra Sedgwick, Rupert Grint, Fix My Man Week | Yes |
| July 12 | Regis Philbin & Kelly Ripa | Yes | Emma Watson, Fix My Man Week | No |
| July 13 | Regis Philbin & Kelly Ripa | Yes | Glenn Close, Blake Shelton, Fix My Man Week | No |
| July 14 | Regis Philbin & Kelly Ripa | Yes | Daniel Radcliffe, Joss Stone, Fix My Man Week | No |
| July 15 | Regis Philbin & Kelly Ripa | Yes | Lisa Kudrow, Tom Felton, Fix My Man Week | No |
| July 18 | Regis Philbin & Kelly Ripa | Yes | Mila Kunis, Do It Week | No |
| July 19 | Regis Philbin & Kelly Ripa | Yes | Marisa Tomei, Hot Chelle Rae, Do It Week | No |
| July 20 | Regis Philbin & Kelly Ripa | Yes | Justin Timberlake, Andy Grammer, Do It Week | No |
| July 21 | Regis Philbin & Kelly Ripa | Yes | Adrian Grenier, Aretha Franklin, Do It Week | No |
| July 22 | Regis Philbin & Kelly Ripa | Yes | Jeremy Piven, Thomas Kelly, Do It Week | No |
| July 25 | Kelly Ripa & Neil Patrick Harris | Yes | Heidi Klum, Jayma Mays, Rescue Me! Ambush Makeovers Week | No |
| July 26 | Regis Philbin & Kelly Ripa | Yes | Steve Carell, Ray Davies, Rescue Me! Ambush Makeovers Week | No |
| July 27 | Regis Philbin & Kelly Ripa | Yes | Sofia Vergara, OneRepublic, Rescue Me! Ambush Makeovers Week | No |
| July 28 | Regis Philbin & Kelly Ripa | Yes | Julianne Moore, 3 Doors Down, Rescue Me! Ambush Makeovers Week | No |
| July 29 | Regis Philbin & Kelly Ripa | Yes | Craig Ferguson, Michael Psilakis, Rescue Me! Ambush Makeovers Week | No |

=== August 2011 ===
| Date | Co-Hosts | "Host Chat" | Guests/Segments | "Regis and Kelly Inbox" |
|---|---|---|---|---|
| August 1 | Kelly Ripa & Josh Groban | Yes | Colin Farrell, Ashley Fink, Science Bob | Yes |
| August 2 | Regis Philbin & Kelly Ripa | Yes | Cory Monteith, Ashley Hebert & J.P. Rosenbaum | No |
| August 3 | Regis Philbin & Kelly Ripa | Yes | Alexander Skarsgård, Melissa Joan Hart | Yes |
| August 4 | Regis Philbin & Kelly Ripa | Yes | Bryce Dallas Howard, Caroline Rhea | Yes |
| August 5 | Regis Philbin & Kelly Ripa | Yes | Viola Davis, Kevin McHale, Marcela Valladolid | No |
| August 9 | Regis Philbin & Kelly Ripa | Yes | Jane Fonda, Jennifer Farley, Luke Bryan | No |
| August 10 | Regis Philbin & Kelly Ripa | Yes | Elijah Wood, Paul DelVecchio | Yes |
| August 11 | Regis Philbin & Kelly Ripa | Yes | Emma Stone, Nicole Polizzi | No |
| August 15 | Regis Philbin & Kelly Ripa | Yes | Paul Rudd, Henry Winkler, Dog Days of Summer Week | Yes |
| August 16 | Regis Philbin & Joy Philbin | Yes | Joel McHale, Pia Toscano, Dog Days of Summer Week | No |
| August 17 | Regis Philbin & Erin Andrews | Yes | Jeff Bridges, So You Think You Can Dance winner, Dog Days of Summer Week | Yes |
| August 18 | Regis Philbin & Cat Deeley | Yes | Anne Hathaway, Nicole Scherzinger, Dog Days of Summer Week | No |
| August 19 | Regis Philbin & Jane Krakowski | Yes | Helen Mirren, Dog Days of Summer Week | No |

== Season 24 (2011) ==
=== September 2011 ===
| Date | Co-Hosts | "Host Chat" | Guests/Segments | "Regis and Kelly Inbox" |
|---|---|---|---|---|
| September 5 | Regis Philbin & Kelly Ripa | Yes | Hank Azaria, Kevin Connolly and "Real Housewives of Beverly Hills" | No |
| September 6 | Regis Philbin & Kelly Ripa | Yes | Stephen Moyer and Rachel Zoe | No |
| September 7 | Regis Philbin & Kelly Ripa | Yes | Matt Damon and La La and Carmello Anthony | No |
| September 8 | Regis Philbin & Kelly Ripa | Yes | Salma Hayek and Joe Jonas | No |
| September 9 | Kelly Ripa & Seth Meyers | Yes | Lauren Graham, Kara DioGuardi and "Swamp Brothers" Stephen and Robbie Keszey | No |
| September 12 | Regis Philbin & Kelly Ripa | Yes | Greg Kinnear, Paul Wesley, Guinness World Record Breaker Week | Yes |
| September 13 | Regis Philbin & Kelly Ripa | Yes | Sarah Michelle Gellar, Diane Sawyer, Guinness World Record Breaker Week | No |
| September 14 | Regis Philbin & Kelly Ripa | Yes | Pierce Brosnan, Meredith Vieira, Guinness World Record Breaker Week | No |
| September 15 | Regis Philbin & Kelly Ripa | Yes | Zooey Deschanel, Tim Gunn, Guinness World Record Breaker Week | No |
| September 16 | Kelly Ripa & Andy Cohen | Yes | James Marsden, Gavin Degraw, Guinness World Record Breaker Week | No |
| September 19 | Regis Philbin & Kelly Ripa | Yes | Tom Selleck, Eddie Cibrian and Lawrence Zarian | No |
| September 20 | Regis Philbin & Kelly Ripa | Yes | Julianna Margulies, Paula Abdul and Anna Kournikova | No |
| September 21 | Regis Philbin & Kelly Ripa | Yes | Jonah Hill, Jane Lynch and Kelly Monaco | No |
| September 22 | Regis Philbin & Kelly Ripa | Yes | Taylor Lautner, Celine Dion and Minka Kelly | No |
| September 23 | Kelly Ripa & Dana Carvey | Yes | Elizabeth Hurley, Christina Ricci and Marc Santa Maria | No |
| September 26 | Regis Philbin & Kelly Ripa | Yes | Melissa McCarthy, Cloris Leachman and Blake Shelton | No |
| September 27 | Regis Philbin & Kelly Ripa | Yes | Taye Diggs, Morgan Freeman and Colbie Caillat | No |
| September 28 | Regis Philbin & Kelly Ripa | Yes | Ted Danson, Anna Faris and Allstar Weekend | No |
| September 29 | Regis Philbin & Kelly Ripa | Yes | Claire Danes, Alton Brown and Jason Derulo | No |
| September 30 | Kelly Ripa & Mark Consuelos | Yes | Brooke Shields and Rob Mariano | No |

=== October 2011 ===
| Date | Co-Hosts | "Host Chat" | Guests/Segments | "Regis and Kelly Inbox" |
|---|---|---|---|---|
| October 3 | Regis Philbin & Kelly Ripa | Yes | Tim McGraw, Dana Delany | Yes |
| October 4 | Regis Philbin & Kelly Ripa | Yes | Hugh Jackman, Kaley Cuoco, Scotty McCreery | No |
| October 5 | Regis Philbin & Kelly Ripa | Yes | Simon Cowell, Sugar Ray Leonard, Dr. Greg Yapalater | No |
| October 6 | Regis Philbin & Kelly Ripa | Yes | George Clooney, Rachel Bilson | No |
| October 7 | Kelly Ripa & Carson Kressley | Yes | Madeleine Stowe, Emilio Estevez, Martin Sheen | No |
| October 10 | Kelly Ripa & Larry the Cable Guy | Yes | Evan Rachel Wood, "The Situation", Co-Host Cook-Off Week | No |
| October 11 | Kelly Ripa & Katie Couric | Yes | Dylan McDermott, Anna Torv, Co-Host Cook-Off Week | No |
| October 12 | Kelly Ripa & Michael Strahan | Yes | Chace Crawford, Jewel, Co-Host Cook-Off Week | No |
| October 13 | Kelly Ripa & Jerry O'Connell | Yes | Taylor Swift, Lauren Alaina, Co-Host Cook-Off Week | No |
| October 14 | Kelly Ripa & Mark Feuerstein | Yes | David Boreanaz, Zachary Quinto, Co-Host Cook-Off Week | No |
| October 17 | Regis Philbin & Kelly Ripa | Yes | Simon Baker, Jessica Capshaw | No |
| October 18 | Regis Philbin & Kelly Ripa | Yes | Kevin Spacey, Disney FamilyFun Magazine: Top Toys | No |
| October 19 | Regis Philbin & Kelly Ripa | Yes | Ricky Gervais, Penn Badgley | No |
| October 20 | Regis Philbin & Kelly Ripa | Yes | Kelsey Grammer, Carrot Top | No |
| October 21 | Kelly Ripa & Josh Groban | Yes | Orlando Bloom, Ginnifer Goodwin, Largest Pumpkin | No |
| October 24 | Regis Philbin & Kelly Ripa | Yes | Matthew Broderick, LeAnn Rimes, Halloween Flashback | No |
| October 25 | Regis Philbin & Kelly Ripa | Yes | Téa Leoni, Halloween Creatures | No |
| October 26 | Regis Philbin & Kelly Ripa | Yes | Salma Hayek, Kids of LIVE Halloween Fashion Show | No |
| October 27 | Regis Philbin & Kelly Ripa | Yes | Eva Longoria, Nicole Polizzi | No |
| October 28 | Regis Philbin & Kelly Ripa | Yes | Nightmares Fear Factory, Judge Judy | No |
| October 31 | Kelly Ripa & Nick Lachey | No | Halloween Headliner's Ball | No |

=== November 2011 ===
| Date | Co-Hosts | "Host Chat" | Guests/Segments | "Regis and Kelly Inbox" |
|---|---|---|---|---|
| November 1 | Regis Philbin & Kelly Ripa | Yes | Brian Williams, Char Margolis, So Wrong, So Right Week | No |
| November 2 | Regis Philbin & Kelly Ripa | Yes | Billy Bob Thornton, Miranda Lambert, So Wrong, So Right Week | No |
| November 3 | Regis Philbin & Kelly Ripa | Yes | Eddie Murphy, So Wrong, So Right Week | No |
| November 4 | Regis Philbin & Kelly Ripa | Yes | Michael J. Fox, So Wrong, So Right Week | No |
| November 7 | Regis Philbin & Kelly Ripa | Yes | Michael Bublé, Regis's Farewell Celebration, Surprise Guest Robert De Niro | No |
| November 8 | Regis Philbin & Kelly Ripa | Yes | Katie Holmes, Peter Facinelli, Regis's Farewell Celebration, Surprise Guest Michael Douglas | No |
| November 9 | Regis Philbin & Kelly Ripa | Yes | Taylor Lautner, People's Choice Awards, Regis's Farewell Celebration, Surprise Guest Liam Neeson | No |
| November 10 | Regis Philbin & Kelly Ripa | Yes | Robert Pattinson, Regis's Farewell Celebration, Surprise Guest Lou Holtz | No |
| November 11 | Regis Philbin & Kelly Ripa | Yes | Adam Sandler, Regis's Farewell Celebration, Surprise Guest Joy Philbin | No |
| November 14 | Regis Philbin & Kelly Ripa | Yes | Jimmy Fallon, Don Rickles, LIVE's Ultimate Fan | No |
| November 15 | Regis Philbin & Kelly Ripa | Yes | Donald Trump, Tony Bennett | No |
| November 16 | Regis Philbin & Kelly Ripa | Yes | David Letterman, Bret Michaels | No |
| November 17 | Regis Philbin & Kelly Ripa | Yes | Kathie Lee Gifford, Josh Groban | No |
| November 18 | Regis Philbin & Kelly Ripa | No | Regis's Final Show | No |
