= Scotty McCreery discography =

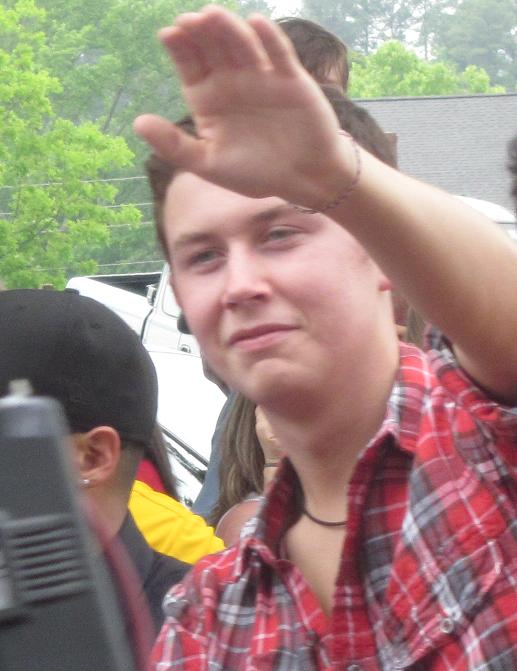
- McCreery performing in May 2011
- Studio albums: 6
- EPs: 3
- Compilation albums: 3
- Singles: 15
- Music videos: 16

American country music singer Scotty McCreery has released six studio albums (including one Christmas album), two compilation albums, two extended plays, ten singles, and ten music videos. McCreery rose to fame after winning the tenth season of American Idol in 2011.

McCreery released his first single (his American Idol coronation song) "I Love You This Big" after his win on May 25, 2011. The single peaked at number eleven on the Billboard Hot 100 and number fourteen on the Hot Country Songs chart. He released his debut studio album, Clear as Day on October 4, 2011, which debuted at number one on the Billboard Top Country Albums chart and reached number one on the Billboard 200. His second album, Christmas with Scotty McCreery was released on October 16, 2012. His third album, See You Tonight, was released on October 15, 2013. McCreery's fourth studio album, Seasons Change was released on March 16, 2018. On September 17, 2021, McCreery released his fifth studio album, Same Truck.

== Albums ==
=== Studio albums ===
Title	Details	Peak chart positions					Certifications	Sales
Title	Details	US	US Country	US Indie	CAN	NZ	Certifications	Sales
Clear as Day	Release date: October 4, 2011; Label: Interscope/19/ Mercury Nashville; Formats: CD, digital download	1	1	—	4	32	RIAA: Platinum	US: 1,163,000
Christmas with Scotty McCreery	Release date: October 16, 2012; Label: Interscope Records/19/ Mercury Nashville; Formats: CD, digital download	4	2	—	—	—	RIAA: Gold	US: 382,000
See You Tonight	Release date: October 15, 2013; Label: Interscope Records/19/ Mercury Nashville; Formats: CD, digital download	6	1	—	25	—		US: 269,900
Seasons Change	Release date: March 16, 2018; Label: Triple Tigers; Formats: CD, digital download	7	1	—	35	—	RIAA: Gold; MC: Gold	US: 97,800
Same Truck	Release date: September 17, 2021; Label: Triple Tigers; Formats: CD, digital download	86	10	13	—	—		
Rise & Fall	Release date: May 10, 2024; Label: Triple Tigers; Formats: CD, digital download	128	25	22	—	—		
"—" denotes a recording that did not chart.

=== Compilation albums ===
Title	Details	Peak chart positions				Sales
Title	Details	US	US Country	US Indie	CAN	Sales
American Idol Season 10: Scotty McCreery	Release date: May 24, 2011; Label: 19; Formats: Digital download	12	3	3	25	US: 42,000
Scotty McCreery QVC Bundle	Release date: October 30, 2012; Label: Interscope Records/Mercury Nashville/19; Formats: CD	93	20	—	—	US: 5,000
15	Release date: July 17, 2026; Label: Triple Tigers; Formats: CD, digital download	To be released				
"—" denotes a recording that did not chart.

== Extended plays ==
Title	Details	Peak chart positions			Sales
Title	Details	US	US Country	CAN	Sales
American Idol Season 10 Highlights: Scotty McCreery	Released: June 28, 2011; Label: Interscope Records/19/ Mercury Nashville; Formats: CD, digital download	10	2	25	US: 201,000
The Soundcheck Sessions	Released: January 24, 2020; Label: Triple Tigers; Formats: digital download	—	—	—	
Scooter & Friends	Scheduled: July 18, 2025; Label: Triple Tigers; Formats: digital download	—	—	—	
"—" denotes a recording that did not chart.

== Singles ==
Year	Title	Peak chart positions					Sales	Certifications	Album
Year	Title	US	US Country	US Country Airplay	CAN	CAN Country	Sales	Certifications	Album
2011	"I Love You This Big"	11	15		21	15	US: 915,000	RIAA: Platinum	Clear as Day
2011	"The Trouble with Girls"	55	17		—	38	US: 836,000	RIAA: Platinum	Clear as Day
2012	"Water Tower Town"	—	38		—	—	US: 93,000		Clear as Day
2013	"See You Tonight"	52	10	8	—	34	US: 693,000	RIAA: Platinum	See You Tonight
2014	"Feelin' It"	84	16	10	—	46	US: 293,000	RIAA: Gold	See You Tonight
2015	"Southern Belle"	—	—	45	—	—	US: 7,000		Non-album single
2017	"Five More Minutes"	44	4	1	100	2	US: 382,000	RIAA: 4× Platinum; MC: 2× Platinum	Seasons Change
2018	"This Is It"	42	3	1	87	2	US: 115,000	RIAA: Platinum; MC: Platinum	Seasons Change
2019	"In Between"	53	12	1	—	12	US: 97,000	RIAA: Gold; MC: Gold	Seasons Change
2020	"You Time"	50	7	1	—	23		RIAA: Gold; MC: Gold	Same Truck
2021	"Damn Strait"	32	6	1	56	2		RIAA: Platinum; MC: Platinum	Same Truck
2022	"It Matters to Her"	49	13	3	98	4		RIAA: Gold; MC: Gold	Same Truck
2023	"Cab in a Solo"	— (Note: "Cab in a Solo" did not enter the Billboard Hot 100, but peaked at number one on the Bubbling Under Hot 100 chart, an extension of the Hot 100.)	20	2	—	14			Rise & Fall
2024	"Fall of Summer"	—	—	27	—	49			Rise & Fall
2025	"Bottle Rockets" (featuring Hootie & the Blowfish)	32	6	1	43	1		RIAA: Gold; MC: Gold	15
"—" denotes a recording that did not chart.

== Other charted songs ==
Year	Single	Peak chart positions				Sales	Album
Year	Single	US Country	US Country Airplay	US Country Digital	CAN Country	Sales	Album
2011	"Out of Summertime"	—	—	47	—		Clear as Day
2012	"Please Remember Me"	—	—	29	—	US: 58,000	Non-album song
2013	"Jingle Bells"	—	53	—	—		Christmas with Scotty McCreery
2013	"Let It Snow"	—	59	—	—		Christmas with Scotty McCreery
2013	"Forget to Forget You"	48	—	31	—	US: 11,000	See You Tonight
2023	"Feel Like the Holidays"	—	48	—	46		Non-album song
"—" denotes a recording that did not chart.

== Music videos ==
Year	Video	Director
2011	"I Love You This Big"	Shane Drake
2011	"The Trouble with Girls"	Roman White
2012	"Water Tower Town"	Todd Cassetty
2012	"Christmas Comin' Round Again"	Todd Cassetty
2013	"See You Tonight"	Roman White
2014	"Feelin' It"	Roman White
2015	"Southern Belle"	Roman White
2017	"Five More Minutes"	Jeff Ray
2018	"This is It"	Jeff Ray
2019	"In Between"	Jeff Ray
2021	"You Time"	Brianna Fish
2022	"Damn Strait"	Jeff Ray
2024	"Cab in a Solo"	Jeff Ray
2024	"Fall of Summer"	Jeff Ray
2025	"Bottle Rockets" (featuring Hootie & the Blowfish)	Jeff Ray
