= Top 20 Country Countdown =

- Starring: Nan Kelley
- Country of origin: United States

Production
- Running time: 120 minutes

Original release
- Network: Great American Country
- Release: January 16, 2004 – December 21, 2018

Top 20 Country Countdown was a weekly television show that aired on Great American Country (GAC), a United States country music television station, from 2004 to 2018. Fans voted for their favorite videos at Great American Country's website and the results were counted down every Friday. The show was hosted by Nan Kelley.

== Number one videos ==
=== 2004 ===
Issue Date	Song	Artist(s)
January 16	"Remember When"	Alan Jackson
January 23	"American Soldier"	Toby Keith
January 31	"There Goes My Life"	Kenny Chesney
March 26	"It Only Hurts When I'm Breathing"	Shania Twain
April 2	"It Only Hurts When I'm Breathing"	Shania Twain
May 28	"Whiskey Girl"	Toby Keith
June 4	"Whiskey Girl"	Toby Keith
June 11	"Redneck Woman"	Gretchen Wilson
June 18	"Redneck Woman"	Gretchen Wilson
June 25	"Redneck Woman"	Gretchen Wilson
July 2	"Redneck Woman"	Gretchen Wilson
July 9	"What It Ain't"	Josh Turner
July 16	"Live Like You Were Dying"	Tim McGraw
July 23	"Live Like You Were Dying"	Tim McGraw
July 30	"Live Like You Were Dying"	Tim McGraw
August 6	"Live Like You Were Dying"	Tim McGraw
August 13	"Whiskey Lullaby"	Brad Paisley feat. Alison Krauss
August 20	"Whiskey Lullaby"	Brad Paisley feat. Alison Krauss
September 3	"Save a Horse (Ride a Cowboy)"	Big & Rich
September 10	"Rough & Ready"	Trace Adkins
September 17	"Too Much of a Good Thing"	Alan Jackson
September 24	"Too Much of a Good Thing"	Alan Jackson
October 1	"Some Beach"	Blake Shelton
October 8	"Some Beach"	Blake Shelton
October 15	"Suds in the Bucket"	Sara Evans
November 26	"Party For Two"	Shania Twain & Billy Currington
December 3	"Come Home Soon"	SHeDAISY
December 10	"Party For Two"	Shania Twain & Billy Currington

=== 2005 ===
Issue Date	Song	Artist(s)
April 30	"Goodbye Time"	Blake Shelton
May 7	"Making Memories Of Us"	Keith Urban
May 28	"Goodbye Time"	Blake Shelton
June 5	"Goodbye Time"	Blake Shelton
June 11	"The Talkin' Song Repair Blues"	Alan Jackson
June 18	"The Talkin' Song Repair Blues"	Alan Jackson
June 25	"The Talkin' Song Repair Blues"	Alan Jackson
July 2	"As Good As I Once Was"	Toby Keith
July 9	"As Good As I Once Was"	Toby Keith
July 16	"As Good As I Once Was"	Toby Keith
July 23	"As Good As I Once Was"	Toby Keith
July 30	"As Good As I Once Was"	Toby Keith
August 6	"Mississippi Girl"	Faith Hill
August 13	"Play Something Country"	Brooks & Dunn
August 20	"Play Something Country"	Brooks & Dunn
August 27	"Georgia Rain"	Trisha Yearwood
September 24	"Best I Ever Had"	Gary Allan
October 1	"All Jacked Up"	Gretchen Wilson
October 8	"All Jacked Up"	Gretchen Wilson
October 15	"Must Be Doin' Somethin' Right"	Billy Currington
October 22	"Must Be Doin' Somethin' Right"	Billy Currington
October 29	"Like We Never Loved At All"	Faith Hill feat. Tim McGraw
November 12	"Nobody but Me"	Blake Shelton
November 19	"Like We Never Loved At All"	Faith Hill feat. Tim McGraw
November 26	"Big Blue Note"	Toby Keith
December 3	"Tequila Makes Her Clothes Fall Off"	Joe Nichols
December 10	"Tequila Makes Her Clothes Fall Off"	Joe Nichols
December 17	"Honky Tonk Badonkadonk"	Trace Adkins
December 24	"Honky Tonk Badonkadonk"	Trace Adkins

=== 2007 ===
Issue Date	Song	Artist(s)
January 5	"Ladies Love Country Boys"	Trace Adkins
January 12	"Before He Cheats"	Carrie Underwood
January 19	"Ladies Love Country Boys"	Trace Adkins
January 26	"Ladies Love Country Boys"	Trace Adkins
February 2	"Ladies Love Country Boys"	Trace Adkins
February 9	"Red High Heels"	Kellie Pickler
February 16	"Ladies Love Country Boys"	Trace Adkins
February 23	"Ladies Love Country Boys"	Trace Adkins
March 2	"Ladies Love Country Boys"	Trace Adkins
March 9	"Ladies Love Country Boys"	Trace Adkins
March 16	"Ladies Love Country Boys"	Trace Adkins
March 23	"Ladies Love Country Boys"	Trace Adkins
March 30	"Ladies Love Country Boys"	Trace Adkins
April 6	"Ladies Love Country Boys"	Trace Adkins
April 13	"Ladies Love Country Boys"	Trace Adkins
April 20	"Ladies Love Country Boys"	Trace Adkins
April 27	"Don't Make Me"	Blake Shelton
May 4	"Don't Make Me"	Blake Shelton
May 11	"Don't Make Me"	Blake Shelton
May 18	"Wasted"	Carrie Underwood
May 25	"I Wonder"	Kellie Pickler
June 1	"I Wonder"	Kellie Pickler
June 8	"I Wonder"	Kellie Pickler
June 15	"I Wonder"	Kellie Pickler
June 22	"I Wonder"	Kellie Pickler
June 29	"I Told You So"	Keith Urban
July 6	"I Wanna Feel Something"	Trace Adkins
July 13	"I Wanna Feel Something"	Trace Adkins
July 20	"I Wanna Feel Something"	Trace Adkins
July 27	"I Wanna Feel Something"	Trace Adkins
August 3	"I Wanna Feel Something"	Trace Adkins
August 10	"I Wanna Feel Something"	Trace Adkins
August 17	"I Wanna Feel Something"	Trace Adkins
August 24	"I Wanna Feel Something"	Trace Adkins
August 31	"Teardrops on My Guitar"	Taylor Swift
September 7	"Because of You"	Reba McEntire & Kelly Clarkson
September 14	"Because of You"	Reba McEntire & Kelly Clarkson
September 21	"Because of You"	Reba McEntire & Kelly Clarkson
September 28	"The More I Drink"	Blake Shelton
October 12	"I Got My Game On"	Trace Adkins
October 19	"I Got My Game On"	Trace Adkins
October 26	"I Got My Game On"	Trace Adkins
November 2	"I Got My Game On"	Trace Adkins
November 9	"I Got My Game On"	Trace Adkins
November 16	"I Got My Game On"	Trace Adkins
November 23	"More Than a Memory"	Garth Brooks
November 30	"More Than a Memory"	Garth Brooks
December 7	"I Got My Game On"	Trace Adkins
December 14	"I Got My Game On"	Trace Adkins
December 21	"I Got My Game On"	Trace Adkins

=== 2008 ===
Issue Date	Song	Artist(s)
January 11	"So Small"	Carrie Underwood
January 18	"So Small"	Carrie Underwood
January 25	"So Small"	Carrie Underwood
February 1	"So Small"	Carrie Underwood
February 8	"Stay"	Sugarland
February 15	"All-American Girl"	Carrie Underwood
February 22	"All-American Girl"	Carrie Underwood
February 29	"All-American Girl"	Carrie Underwood
March 7	"Small Town Southern Man"	Alan Jackson
March 14	"I'm Only Me When I'm With You"	Taylor Swift
March 21	"All-American Girl"	Carrie Underwood
March 28	"All-American Girl"	Carrie Underwood
April 4	"All-American Girl"	Carrie Underwood
April 11	"All-American Girl"	Carrie Underwood
April 18	"All-American Girl"	Carrie Underwood
April 25	"You're Gonna Miss This"	Trace Adkins
May 2	"You're Gonna Miss This"	Trace Adkins
May 9	"You're Gonna Miss This"	Trace Adkins
May 16	"You're Gonna Miss This"	Trace Adkins
May 23	"You're Gonna Miss This"	Trace Adkins
May 30	"You're Gonna Miss This"	Trace Adkins
June 6	"Home"	Blake Shelton
June 13	"You're Gonna Miss This"	Trace Adkins
June 20	"You're Gonna Miss This"	Trace Adkins
June 27	"You're Gonna Miss This"	Trace Adkins
July 4	"You're Gonna Miss This"	Trace Adkins
July 11	"Home"	Blake Shelton
July 18	"Home"	Blake Shelton
July 25	"Home"	Blake Shelton
August 1	"Home"	Blake Shelton
August 8	"Home"	Blake Shelton
August 15	"Home"	Blake Shelton
August 22	"Don't You Know You're Beautiful"	Kellie Pickler
August 29	"Don't You Know You're Beautiful"	Kellie Pickler
September 5	"Don't You Know You're Beautiful"	Kellie Pickler
September 12	"Don't You Know You're Beautiful"	Kellie Pickler
September 19	"Just a Dream"	Carrie Underwood
September 26	"Just a Dream"	Carrie Underwood
October 3	"Don't You Know You're Beautiful"	Kellie Pickler
October 10	"Just a Dream"	Carrie Underwood
October 17	"She Wouldn't Be Gone"	Blake Shelton
October 24	"Just a Dream"	Carrie Underwood
October 31	"Don't You Know You're Beautiful"	Kellie Pickler
November 7	"Muddy Water"	Trace Adkins
November 14	"Just a Dream"	Carrie Underwood
November 21	"Just a Dream"	Carrie Underwood
November 27	"Just a Dream"	Carrie Underwood
December 5	"Just a Dream"	Carrie Underwood
December 12	"Muddy Water"	Trace Adkins
December 19	"Muddy Water"	Trace Adkins

=== 2009 ===
Issue Date	Song	Artist(s)
January 9	"Muddy Water"	Trace Adkins
January 16	"She Wouldn't Be Gone"	Blake Shelton
January 23	"She Wouldn't Be Gone"	Blake Shelton
January 30	"She Wouldn't Be Gone"	Blake Shelton
February 6	"She Wouldn't Be Gone"	Blake Shelton
February 13	"She Wouldn't Be Gone"	Blake Shelton
February 20	"She Wouldn't Be Gone"	Blake Shelton
February 27	"She Wouldn't Be Gone"	Blake Shelton
March 6	"She Wouldn't Be Gone"	Blake Shelton
March 13	"She Wouldn't Be Gone"	Blake Shelton
March 20	"Belongs to You"	Emerson Drive
March 27	"She Wouldn't Be Gone"	Blake Shelton
April 3	"I Told You So"	Carrie Underwood
April 10	"Marry for Money"	Trace Adkins
April 17	"I Told You So"	Carrie Underwood
April 24	"Best Days of Your Life"	Kellie Pickler; Taylor Swift
May 1	"Best Days of Your Life"	Kellie Pickler; Taylor Swift
May 8	"I Told You So"	Carrie Underwood
May 15	"I Told You So"	Carrie Underwood
May 22	"Best Days of Your Life"	Kellie Pickler
May 29	"I Told You So"	Carrie Underwood
June 5	"Best Days of Your Life"	Kellie Pickler
June 12	"Best Days of Your Life"	Kellie Pickler
June 19	"Best Days of Your Life"	Kellie Pickler
June 26	"Best Days of Your Life"	Kellie Pickler
July 3	"Best Days of Your Life"	Kellie Pickler
July 10	"Best Days of Your Life"	Kellie Pickler
July 17	"People Are Crazy"	Billy Currington
July 24	"People Are Crazy"	Billy Currington
July 31	"People Are Crazy"	Billy Currington
August 7	"People Are Crazy"	Billy Currington
August 14	"People Are Crazy"	Billy Currington
August 21	"People Are Crazy"	Billy Currington
August 28	"Do I"	Luke Bryan
September 4	"Do I"	Luke Bryan
September 11	"Do I"	Luke Bryan
September 18	"Do I"	Luke Bryan
September 25	"Do I"	Luke Bryan
October 2	"Do I"	Luke Bryan
October 9	"Do I"	Luke Bryan
October 16	"Need You Now"	Lady Antebellum
October 23	"Didn't You Know How Much I Loved You"	Kellie Pickler
October 30	"Cowboy Casanova" (First song to debut at #1)	Carrie Underwood
November 6	"Cowboy Casanova" (First song to debut at #1)	Carrie Underwood
November 13	"Cowboy Casanova" (First song to debut at #1)	Carrie Underwood
November 20	"Fifteen"	Taylor Swift
November 27	"Cowboy Casanova"	Carrie Underwood
December 4	"Cowboy Casanova"	Carrie Underwood
December 11	"Cowboy Casanova"	Carrie Underwood
December 18	"Cowboy Casanova"	Carrie Underwood

=== 2010 ===
Issue Date	Song	Artist(s)
January 8	"Cowboy Casanova"	Carrie Underwood
January 15	"Cowboy Casanova"	Carrie Underwood
January 22	"Highway 20 Ride"	Zac Brown Band
January 29	"Highway 20 Ride"	Zac Brown Band
February 5	"Highway 20 Ride"	Zac Brown Band
February 12	"Cowboy Casanova"	Carrie Underwood
February 19	"Temporary Home"	Carrie Underwood
February 26	"Temporary Home"	Carrie Underwood
March 5	"Highway 20 Ride"	Zac Brown Band
March 12	"Highway 20 Ride"	Zac Brown Band
March 19	"Highway 20 Ride"	Zac Brown Band
March 26	"Stay Here Forever"	Jewel
April 2	"Fearless"	Taylor Swift
April 9	"Temporary Home"	Carrie Underwood
April 16	"Temporary Home"	Carrie Underwood
April 23	"Temporary Home"	Carrie Underwood
April 30	"Temporary Home"	Carrie Underwood
May 7	"Temporary Home"	Carrie Underwood
May 14	"Highway 20 Ride"	Zac Brown Band
May 21	"Temporary Home"	Carrie Underwood
May 28	"Temporary Home"	Carrie Underwood
June 4	"Temporary Home"	Carrie Underwood
June 11	"Temporary Home"	Carrie Underwood
June 18	"Undo It" (Debuted at #1)	Carrie Underwood
June 25	"Undo It" (Debuted at #1)	Carrie Underwood
July 2	"Undo It" (Debuted at #1)	Carrie Underwood
July 9	"Undo It" (Debuted at #1)	Carrie Underwood
July 16	"Undo It" (Debuted at #1)	Carrie Underwood
July 23	"Undo It" (Debuted at #1)	Carrie Underwood
July 30	"Undo It" (Debuted at #1)	Carrie Underwood
August 6	"Wildflower"	The JaneDear Girls
August 13	"Undo It"	Carrie Underwood
August 20	"Undo It"	Carrie Underwood
August 27	"Undo It"	Carrie Underwood
September 3	"Undo It"	Carrie Underwood
September 10	"Undo It"	Carrie Underwood
September 17	"Undo It"	Carrie Underwood
September 24	"Mine"	Taylor Swift
October 1	"Undo It"	Carrie Underwood
October 8	"Mama's Song" (Debuted at #1)	Carrie Underwood
October 15	"Mama's Song" (Debuted at #1)	Carrie Underwood
October 22	"Mama's Song" (Debuted at #1)	Carrie Underwood
October 29	"Mama's Song" (Debuted at #1)	Carrie Underwood
November 5	"Mama's Song" (Debuted at #1)	Carrie Underwood
November 12	"Mama's Song" (Debuted at #1)	Carrie Underwood
November 19	"Mama's Song" (Debuted at #1)	Carrie Underwood
November 26	"Mama's Song" (Debuted at #1)	Carrie Underwood
December 3	"Mama's Song" (Debuted at #1)	Carrie Underwood
December 10	"Mama's Song" (Debuted at #1)	Carrie Underwood
December 17	"My Kinda Party"	Jason Aldean

=== 2011 ===
Issue Date	Song	Artist(s)
January 14	"Mama's Song"	Carrie Underwood
January 21	"Mama's Song"	Carrie Underwood
January 28	"Mama's Song"	Carrie Underwood
February 4	"Best Song Ever"	Katie Armiger
February 11	"Best Song Ever"	Katie Armiger
February 18	"Best Song Ever"	Katie Armiger
February 25	"Mama's Song"	Carrie Underwood
March 4	"I Wouldn't Be a Man"	Josh Turner
March 11	"Best Song Ever"	Katie Armiger
March 18	"I Wouldn't Be a Man"	Josh Turner
March 25	"Don't You Wanna Stay" (from the 2010 CMA Awards)	Jason Aldean and Kelly Clarkson
April 1	"Don't You Wanna Stay" (from the 2010 CMA Awards)	Jason Aldean and Kelly Clarkson
April 8	"Don't You Wanna Stay" (from the 2010 CMA Awards)	Jason Aldean and Kelly Clarkson
April 15	"Don't You Wanna Stay" (from the 2010 CMA Awards)	Jason Aldean and Kelly Clarkson
April 22	"Don't You Wanna Stay" (from the 2010 CMA Awards)	Jason Aldean and Kelly Clarkson
April 29	"Without You"	Keith Urban
May 6	"Without You"	Keith Urban
May 13	"Without You"	Keith Urban
May 20	"A Little Bit Stronger"	Sara Evans
May 27	"Honey Bee"	Blake Shelton
June 3	"Honey Bee"	Blake Shelton
June 10	"Mean"	Taylor Swift
June 17	"Mean"	Taylor Swift
June 24	"Maybe Tonight"	Margaret Durante
July 1	"Tomorrow"	Chris Young
July 8	"Honey Bee"	Blake Shelton
July 15	"Maybe Tonight"	Margaret Durante
July 22	"Maybe Tonight"	Margaret Durante
July 29	"Maybe Tonight"	Margaret Durante
August 5	"I Do but Do I"	Katie Armiger
August 12	"I Do but Do I"	Katie Armiger
August 19	"Wanna Take You Home"	Gloriana
August 26	"Wanna Take You Home"	Gloriana
September 2	"Sparks Fly"	Taylor Swift
September 9	"Wanna Take You Home"	Gloriana
September 16	"Wanna Take You Home"	Gloriana
September 23	"Sparks Fly"	Taylor Swift
September 30	"Didn't I"	James Wesley
October 7	"Didn't I"	James Wesley
October 14	"Remind Me"	Brad Paisley and Carrie Underwood
October 21	"I Love You This Big"	Scotty McCreery
October 28	"I Love You This Big"	Scotty McCreery
November 4	"I Love You This Big"	Scotty McCreery
November 11	"God Gave Me You"	Blake Shelton
November 18	"The Trouble with Girls"	Scotty McCreery
November 25	"The Trouble with Girls"	Scotty McCreery
December 2	"The Trouble with Girls"	Scotty McCreery
December 9	"The Trouble with Girls"	Scotty McCreery
December 16	"The Trouble with Girls"	Scotty McCreery

=== 2012 ===
Issue Date	Song	Artist(s)
January 6	"The Trouble with Girls"	Scotty McCreery
January 13	"Ours"	Taylor Swift
January 20	"The Trouble With Girls"	Scotty McCreery
January 27	"The Trouble With Girls"	Scotty McCreery
February 3	"The Trouble With Girls"	Scotty McCreery
February 10	"The Trouble With Girls"	Scotty McCreery
February 17	"The Trouble With Girls"	Scotty McCreery
February 24	"The Trouble With Girls"	Scotty McCreery
March 2	"The Trouble With Girls"	Scotty McCreery
March 9	"So You Don't Have to Love Me Anymore"	Alan Jackson
March 16	"Over You"	Miranda Lambert
March 23	"So You Don't Have to Love Me Anymore"	Alan Jackson
March 30	"Good Girl"	Carrie Underwood
April 6	"Good Girl"	Carrie Underwood
April 13	"Wanted"	Hunter Hayes
April 20	"Good Girl"	Carrie Underwood
April 27	"Good Girl"	Carrie Underwood
May 4	"Good Girl"	Carrie Underwood
May 11	"Wanted"	Hunter Hayes
May 18	"Wanted"	Hunter Hayes
May 25	"Wanted"	Hunter Hayes
June 1	"Good Girl"	Carrie Underwood
June 8	"Good Girl"	Carrie Underwood
June 15	"Good Girl"	Carrie Underwood
June 22	"Good Girl"	Carrie Underwood
June 29	"Good Girl"	Carrie Underwood
July 6	"Water Tower Town"	Scotty McCreery
July 13	"Water Tower Town"	Scotty McCreery
July 20	"Water Tower Town"	Scotty McCreery
July 27	"Water Tower Town"	Scotty McCreery
August 3	"Water Tower Town"	Scotty McCreery
August 10	"Blown Away" (Debuted at #1)	Carrie Underwood
August 17	"Blown Away" (Debuted at #1)	Carrie Underwood
August 24	"Blown Away" (Debuted at #1)	Carrie Underwood
August 31	"Blown Away" (Debuted at #1)	Carrie Underwood
September 7	"Blown Away" (Debuted at #1)	Carrie Underwood
September 14	"Blown Away" (Debuted at #1)	Carrie Underwood
September 21	"Blown Away" (Debuted at #1)	Carrie Underwood
September 28	"Blown Away" (Debuted at #1)	Carrie Underwood
October 5	"Blown Away" (Debuted at #1)	Carrie Underwood
October 12	"Blown Away" (Debuted at #1)	Carrie Underwood
October 19	"Better In A Black Dress"	Katie Armiger
October 26	"Blown Away"	Carrie Underwood
November 2	"Blown Away"	Carrie Underwood
November 9	"Blown Away"	Carrie Underwood
November 16	"Blown Away"	Carrie Underwood
November 23	"Begin Again"	Taylor Swift
November 30	"A Heart Like Mine"	Dwight Yoakam
December 7	"A Heart Like Mine"	Dwight Yoakam
December 14	"Begin Again"	Taylor Swift
December 21	"American Heart"	Faith Hill

=== 2013 ===
Issue Date	Song	Artist(s)
January 11	"A Heart Like Mine"	Dwight Yoakam
January 18	"Home To Me"	Sarah Darling
January 25	"Every Storm (Runs Out of Rain)"	Gary Allan
February 1	"Begin Again"	Taylor Swift
February 8	"Two Black Cadillacs"	Carrie Underwood
February 15	"Two Black Cadillacs"	Carrie Underwood
February 22	"Two Black Cadillacs"	Carrie Underwood
March 1	"I Drive Your Truck"	Lee Brice
March 8	"Two Black Cadillacs"	Carrie Underwood
March 15	"I Drive Your Truck"	Lee Brice
March 22	"I Drive Your Truck"	Lee Brice
March 29	"I Drive Your Truck"	Lee Brice
April 5	"She Cranks My Tractor"	Dustin Lynch
April 12	"Two Black Cadillacs"	Carrie Underwood
April 19	"Two Black Cadillacs"	Carrie Underwood
April 26	"Two Black Cadillacs"	Carrie Underwood
May 3	"Two Black Cadillacs"	Carrie Underwood
May 10	"Two Black Cadillacs"	Carrie Underwood
May 17	"If I Didn't Have You"	Thompson Square
May 24	"Boys 'Round Here"	Blake Shelton
May 31	"Boys 'Round Here"	Blake Shelton
June 8	"Boys 'Round Here"	Blake Shelton
June 15	"Boys 'Round Here"	Blake Shelton
June 22	"See You Again" (Debuted at #1)	Carrie Underwood
June 29	"See You Again" (Debuted at #1)	Carrie Underwood
July 6	"See You Again" (Debuted at #1)	Carrie Underwood
July 13	"See You Again" (Debuted at #1)	Carrie Underwood
July 20	"See You Again" (Debuted at #1)	Carrie Underwood
July 27	"See You Again" (Debuted at #1)	Carrie Underwood
August 3	"See You Again" (Debuted at #1)	Carrie Underwood
August 10	"See You Again" (Debuted at #1)	Carrie Underwood
August 17	"See You Again" (Debuted at #1)	Carrie Underwood
August 24	"See You Again" (Debuted at #1)	Carrie Underwood
August 31	"See You Again" (Debuted at #1)	Carrie Underwood
September 7	"See You Again" (Debuted at #1)	Carrie Underwood
September 14	"See You Again" (Debuted at #1)	Carrie Underwood
September 21	"See You Again" (Debuted at #1)	Carrie Underwood
September 28	"See You Again" (Debuted at #1)	Carrie Underwood
October 5	"See You Tonight"	Scotty McCreery
October 12	"See You Tonight"	Scotty McCreery
October 19	"See You Tonight"	Scotty McCreery
October 26	"See You Tonight"	Scotty McCreery
November 2	"See You Tonight"	Scotty McCreery
November 9	"See You Tonight"	Scotty McCreery
November 16	"Blue Ridge Mountain Song"	Alan Jackson
November 23	"See You Tonight"	Scotty McCreery
November 30	"Blue Ridge Mountain Song"	Alan Jackson
December 7	"See You Tonight"	Scotty McCreery
December 14	"See You Tonight"	Scotty McCreery
December 21	"See You Tonight"	Scotty McCreery

=== 2014 ===
Issue Date	Song	Artist(s)
January 10	"See You Tonight"	Scotty McCreery
January 17	"Blue Ridge Mountain Song"	Alan Jackson
January 24	"Blue Ridge Mountain Song"	Alan Jackson
January 31	"Blown Away Medley (Live)"	Carrie Underwood
February 7	"Blown Away Medley (Live)"	Carrie Underwood
February 14	"Safe"	Katie Armiger
February 21	"Blown Away Medley (Live)"	Carrie Underwood
February 28	"Blown Away Medley (Live)"	Carrie Underwood
March 7	"Blown Away Medley (Live)"	Carrie Underwood
March 14	"Blown Away Medley (Live)"	Carrie Underwood
March 21	"Blown Away Medley (Live)"	Carrie Underwood
March 28	"Blown Away Medley (Live)"	Carrie Underwood
April 4	"Blown Away Medley (Live)"	Carrie Underwood
April 11	"Blown Away Medley (Live)"	Carrie Underwood
April 18	"Blown Away Medley (Live)"	Carrie Underwood
April 25	"Blown Away Medley (Live)"	Carrie Underwood
May 2	"Blown Away Medley (Live)"	Carrie Underwood
May 9	"Automatic"	Miranda Lambert
May 16	"Automatic"	Miranda Lambert
May 23	"Automatic"	Miranda Lambert
May 30	"Automatic"	Miranda Lambert
June 6	"Who I Am with You"	Chris Young
June 13	"Who I Am with You"	Chris Young
June 20	"Who I Am with You"	Chris Young
June 27	"Young in America"	Danielle Bradbery
July 4	"Young in America"	Danielle Bradbery
July 11	"Young in America"	Danielle Bradbery
July 18	"Somethin' Bad" (Debuted at #1)	Miranda Lambert & Carrie Underwood
July 25	"Somethin' Bad" (Debuted at #1)	Miranda Lambert & Carrie Underwood
August 1	"Somethin' Bad" (Debuted at #1)	Miranda Lambert & Carrie Underwood
August 8	"Somethin' Bad" (Debuted at #1)	Miranda Lambert & Carrie Underwood
August 15	"Feelin' It"	Scotty McCreery
August 22	"Somethin' Bad"	Miranda Lambert & Carrie Underwood
August 29	"Feelin' It"	Scotty McCreery
September 5	"Somethin' Bad"	Miranda Lambert & Carrie Underwood
September 12	"Somethin' Bad"	Miranda Lambert & Carrie Underwood
September 19	"Somethin' Bad"	Miranda Lambert & Carrie Underwood
September 26	"Somethin' Bad"	Miranda Lambert & Carrie Underwood
October 3	"Somethin' Bad"	Miranda Lambert & Carrie Underwood
October 10	"Somethin' Bad"	Miranda Lambert & Carrie Underwood
October 17	"Somethin' Bad"	Miranda Lambert & Carrie Underwood
October 24	"Somethin' Bad"	Miranda Lambert & Carrie Underwood
October 31	"Neon Light"	Blake Shelton
November 7	"Neon Light"	Blake Shelton
November 14	"Neon Light"	Blake Shelton
November 21	"Neon Light"	Blake Shelton
November 28	"Neon Light"	Blake Shelton
December 5	"Something In The Water"	Carrie Underwood
December 12	"Something In The Water"	Carrie Underwood
December 19	"Something In The Water"	Carrie Underwood

=== 2015 ===
Issue Date	Song	Artist(s)
January 9	"Something In The Water"	Carrie Underwood
January 16	"Something In The Water"	Carrie Underwood
January 23	"Something In The Water"	Carrie Underwood
January 30	"Something In The Water"	Carrie Underwood
February 6	"Lonely Tonight"	Blake Shelton & Ashley Monroe
February 13	"Lonely Tonight"	Blake Shelton & Ashley Monroe
February 20	"Talladega"	Eric Church
February 27	"Talladega"	Eric Church
March 6	"Talladega"	Eric Church
March 13	"Little Toy Guns"	Carrie Underwood
March 20	"Lonely Tonight"	Blake Shelton & Ashley Monroe
March 27	"Little Toy Guns"	Carrie Underwood
April 3	"Little Toy Guns"	Carrie Underwood
April 10	"Little Red Wagon"	Miranda Lambert
April 17	"Little Red Wagon"	Miranda Lambert
April 24	"Sangria"	Blake Shelton
May 1	"Sangria"	Blake Shelton
May 8	"Sangria"	Blake Shelton
May 15	"Girl Crush"	Little Big Town
September 4	"Come Back to Me"	Keith Urban
September 11	"I'm Comin' Over"	Chris Young
September 18	"Smoke Break"	Carrie Underwood
September 25	"Smoke Break"	Carrie Underwood
October 2	"Smoke Break"	Carrie Underwood
October 9	"Smoke Break"	Carrie Underwood
October 16	"Smoke Break"	Carrie Underwood
October 23	"Smoke Break"	Carrie Underwood
October 30	"Smoke Break"	Carrie Underwood
November 6	"Smoke Break"	Carrie Underwood
November 13	"Smoke Break"	Carrie Underwood
November 20	"Southern Belle"	Scotty McCreery
November 27	"Southern Belle"	Scotty McCreery
December 4	"Southern Belle"	Scotty McCreery
December 11	"Southern Belle"	Scotty McCreery
December 18	"Southern Belle"	Scotty McCreery
December 25	"Smoke Break" (Top Videos of the Year Countdown)	Carrie Underwood

=== 2016 ===
Issue Date	Song	Artist(s)
January 1	"Smoke Break" (Top Videos of the Year Countdown)	Carrie Underwood
January 8	"Southern Belle"	Scotty McCreery
January 15	"Southern Belle"	Scotty McCreery
January 22	"Southern Belle"	Scotty McCreery
January 29	"Die a Happy Man"	Thomas Rhett
February 5	"Heartbeat"	Carrie Underwood
February 12	"Heartbeat"	Carrie Underwood
February 19	"Heartbeat"	Carrie Underwood
February 26	"Heartbeat"	Carrie Underwood
March 4	"Heartbeat"	Carrie Underwood
March 11	"Heartbeat"	Carrie Underwood
March 18	"Think of You"	Chris Young feat. Cassadee Pope
March 25	"Think of You"	Chris Young feat. Cassadee Pope
April 1	"Think of You"	Chris Young feat. Cassadee Pope
April 8	"Think of You"	Chris Young feat. Cassadee Pope
April 15	"Came Here to Forget"	Blake Shelton
April 22	"Came Here to Forget"	Blake Shelton
April 29	"Came Here to Forget"	Blake Shelton
May 6	"Came Here to Forget"	Blake Shelton
May 13	"Came Here to Forget"	Blake Shelton
May 20	"Came Here to Forget"	Blake Shelton
May 27	"Church Bells"(Debuted at #1)	Carrie Underwood
June 3	"Came Here to Forget"	Blake Shelton
June 10	"Came Here to Forget"	Blake Shelton
June 17	"Came Here to Forget"	Blake Shelton
June 24	"Church Bells"	Carrie Underwood
July 1	"Church Bells"	Carrie Underwood
July 8	"Church Bells"	Carrie Underwood
July 15	"Church Bells"	Carrie Underwood
July 22	"Church Bells"	Carrie Underwood
July 29	"Church Bells"	Carrie Underwood
August 5	"Church Bells"	Carrie Underwood
August 12	"She's Got a Way with Words"	Blake Shelton
August 19	"She's Got a Way with Words"	Blake Shelton
August 26	"She's Got a Way with Words"	Blake Shelton
September 2	"She's Got a Way with Words"	Blake Shelton
September 9	"She's Got a Way with Words"	Blake Shelton
September 16	"She's Got a Way with Words"	Blake Shelton
September 23	"She's Got a Way with Words"	Blake Shelton
September 30	"She's Got a Way with Words"	Blake Shelton
October 7	"She's Got a Way with Words"	Blake Shelton
October 14	"Vice"	Miranda Lambert
October 21	"She's Got a Way With Words"	Blake Shelton
October 28	"Vice"	Miranda Lambert
November 4	"Vice"	Miranda Lambert
November 11	"Dirty Laundry"	Carrie Underwood
November 18	"Dirty Laundry"	Carrie Underwood
November 25	"Dirty Laundry"	Carrie Underwood
December 2	"Vice"	Miranda Lambert
December 16 (Christmas Countdown)	"What God Wants for Christmas"	Darius Rucker
