= Jay Smith (songwriter) =

Jay Smith is the author of the single I Love You This Big sung by American Idol winner Scotty McCreery.

Jay Smith was born in Galveston, Texas, September 1979, the ninth of 11 children. Early in his childhood, his family left Galveston and moved to what is known as one of Houston's roughest and toughest neighborhoods – the Fifth Ward.

At the age of 14, Smith's mother died from a blood clot and fluid in her lungs, and three months later his father died from a heart attack. Life became a whole new challenge and Smith ended up sleeping on the streets until he was picked up by the police and placed into foster care. At the age of 17, Jay Smith found himself out of foster care system and displaced back on the same streets.Through a religious outreach organization an outreach pastor named Dennis Rogers took Smith under his wing, and to this day, Smith fondly refers to him as "Pop." Rogers later connected Smith with boxing champion Evander Holyfield (Real Deal Records), and both men helped Smith transition from a teen in the streets to an adulthood.

Jay Smith has written the single "Dancing While Intoxicated " performed by the LoCash Cowboys and "Happy In Hell" performed by Colt Ford featuring Boyz II Men.
