= It Matters to Her =

Single by Scotty McCreery

from the album Same Truck
- Released: September 12, 2022
- Genre: Country
- Length: 2:51
- Label: Triple Tigers
- Songwriters: Scotty McCreery; Lee Thomas Miller; Rhett Akins
- Producers: Frank Rogers; Aaron Eshuis

Scotty McCreery singles chronology
"Damn Strait" (2021)	"It Matters to Her" (2022)	"Cab in a Solo" (2023)

Music video
- "It Matters to Her" on YouTube

"It Matters to Her" is a song by American country music singer Scotty McCreery. He wrote the song with Lee Thomas Miller and Rhett Akins. It was released on September 12, 2022 as the third single from his fifth studio album Same Truck.

== Content ==
McCreery told Music Mayhem magazine that the song was inspired by a conversation between him and Rhett Akins about their relationships with their wives. He also said that he was inspired by the music of Brooks & Dunn when composing it. McCreery's wife, Gabi, also appears in the corresponding music video.

== Chart performance ==
"It Matters to Her" peaked at number three on the Billboard Country Airplay chart dated June 10, 2023, becoming McCreery's first single to miss the number one position since "Southern Belle" in 2015.

== Charts ==
=== Weekly charts ===
Weekly chart performance for "It Matters to Her"
Chart (2022–2023)	Peak position
Canada Hot 100 (Billboard)	98
Canada Country (Billboard)	4
US Billboard Hot 100	49
US Country Airplay (Billboard)	3
US Hot Country Songs (Billboard)	13

=== Year-end charts ===
Year-end chart performance for "It Matters to Her"
Chart (2023)	Position
US Country Airplay (Billboard)	29
US Hot Country Songs (Billboard)	42

== Certifications ==
Certifications for "It Matters to Her"
Region	Certification	Certified units/sales
Canada (Music Canada)	Gold	40,000^{‡}
United States (RIAA)	Gold	500,000^{‡}
^{‡} Sales+streaming figures based on certification alone.
