= Southern belle (disambiguation) =

A Southern belle is a stock character representing a young woman of the American South's upper socioeconomic class.

Southern Belle may also refer to:

== Transportation ==
- Southern Belle (KCS train), a passenger train operated by the Kansas City Southern Railway
- Southern Belle, the original name of the Brighton Belle, a steam passenger train operated by the London, Brighton and South Coast Railway

== Music ==
- "Southern Belle" (song), a song by Scotty McCreery
- "Southern Belle", a song by Elliott Smith from his 1995 album Elliott Smith

== Other uses ==
- Southern Belle (video game), a computer game based on the eponymous LBSC steam passenger train
- The Southern Belles, a professional wrestling tag-team from the Gorgeous Ladies of Wrestling
- Southern Belles, a 2005 American film

== See also ==
- Southern Bell, a former operating division of BellSouth
