= Seasons Change (Scotty McCreery album) =

Studio album by Scotty McCreery
- Released: March 16, 2018
- Studio: Ocean Way Recording, The Pool House and Blackbird Studios (Nashville, Tennessee); The Castle and Hound's Ear Studio (Franklin, Tennessee)
- Genre: Country
- Length: 40:19
- Label: Triple Tigers
- Producer: Aaron Eshuis (all tracks except 4 and 5); Derek Wells (all tracks except 4 and 5); Frank Rogers (all tracks)

Scotty McCreery chronology
See You Tonight (2013)	Seasons Change (2018)	Same Truck (2021)

Singles from Seasons Changes
- 1. "Five More Minutes" Released: May 5, 2017; 2. "This Is It" Released: March 9, 2018; 3. "In Between" Released: April 1, 2019

Seasons Change is the fourth studio album by American country singer Scotty McCreery. It was released on March 16, 2018, as his first album for Triple Tigers, and his first since See You Tonight five years prior. The album's lead single is "Five More Minutes", which gained in radio popularity at a point when McCreery was not signed to a label. The song's success led to him signing with Triple Tigers, and in early 2018, "Five More Minutes" became McCreery's first No. 1 Country Airplay single. "This Is It" and "In Between" were released as the album's second and third singles, respectively.

== Content ==
Prior to the album's release, McCreery was signed to Mercury Nashville, and was dropped after "Southern Belle", the intended lead single to a third Mercury album, failed to reach Top 40 on the country music charts. McCreery released the song "Five More Minutes" in 2016, when he was not signed to a record label. Due to the song gaining airplay on Bobby Bones' radio show, "Five More Minutes" gained in popularity and led to McCreery signing with Triple Tigers. In early 2018, "Five More Minutes" became McCreery's first No 1 hit on the Billboard Country Airplay charts. "This Is It" was released as the album's second single in May 2018, and became his second No. 1 hit on the Country Airplay chart. "In Between" was released as the album's third single on April 1, 2019.

Aaron Eshuis, Derek Wells, and Frank Rogers produced the album, and McCreery co-wrote every song on it.

== Critical reception ==
Rating it four out of five stars, Stephen Thomas Erlewine of AllMusic thought that it was McCreery's "best album yet". He also praised the influences of 1990s country music, and thought that the album showed a maturity over the singer's Mercury albums. Sounds Like Nashville writer Cillea Houghton reviewed the album with favor, stating that it "isn’t a stark difference from his past projects, and it doesn’t have to be, acting more like an extension of what made fans love him in the first place."

== Commercial performance ==
Seasons Change debuted at number seven on the US Billboard 200 with 40,000 album-equivalent units, of which 34,000 were pure album sales. It is McCreery's fourth US top 10 album. The album has sold 97,800 copies in the US as of August 2019.

== Track listing ==
All tracks are written by Scotty McCreery, with additional co-writers as noted.

No.	Title	Writer(s)	Length
1.	"Seasons Change"	James McNair; Tommy Cecil	3:46
2.	"Wherever You Are"	Frank Rogers; Dan Isbell	3:04
3.	"Boys from Back Home"	Isbell; Jason Gantt	4:04
4.	"Five More Minutes"	Rogers; Monty Criswell	3:59
5.	"In Between"	Rogers; Jessi Alexander; Jonathan Singleton	3:40
6.	"This Is It"	Rogers; Aaron Eshuis	3:50
7.	"Wrong Again"	Rogers; Phillip White	3:06
8.	"Move It On Out"	Isbell; Eshuis	2:54
9.	"Barefootin'"	Rogers; David Lee Murphy	4:11
10.	"Still"	Eshuis	4:01
11.	"Home in My Mind"	McNair; Cecil	3:37
Total length:			40:19

== Personnel ==
Credits adapted from AllMusic.

- Scotty McCreery – vocals
- David Dorn – organ (1), synthesizers (1, 3–6), acoustic piano (2, 3, 9)
- Aaron Eshuis – programming (1–3, 6–8, 10, 11), organ (8), acoustic guitar (8), electric guitar (8), synthesizers (10)
- Gordon Mote – acoustic piano (4, 5)
- Frank Rogers – programming (4, 5)
- J. T. Corenflos – electric guitar
- Ilya Toshinsky – acoustic guitar (1, 3), bouzouki (1, 3), banjo (8, 11), mandolin (10)
- Derek Wells – electric guitar, acoustic guitar (8, 10), mandolin (11)
- Mike Johnson – steel guitar (4, 5)
- Justin Schipper – steel guitar (11)
- Jimmie Lee Sloas – bass guitar
- Shannon Forrest – drums, percussion (1–3, 6–11)
- Eric Darken – percussion (4, 5)
- Jim Horn – saxophone (9)
- John Hinchey – trombone (9)
- Steve Hermann – trumpet (9)
- Russell Terrell – backing vocals
- Wes Hightower – backing vocals (4, 5)

=== Production ===
- Frank Rogers – producer
- Aaron Eshuis – producer (1–3, 6–11)
- Derek Wells – producer (1–3, 6–11)
- Justin Niebank – recording (1–3, 6–11), mixing
- Richard Burrow – recording (4, 5)
- Austin Atwood – mix assistant
- Drew Bollman – mix assistant, recording assistant (4, 5)
- Lance Van Dyke – recording assistant (4, 5)
- Brian David Willis – digital editing
- Andrew Mendelson – mastering at Georgetown Masters (Nashville, Tennessee)
- Scott Johnson – production assistance
- Sara Dodds – art direction, design
- Shauna Dodds – art direction, design
- Jeff Ray – photography

== Charts ==
=== Weekly charts ===
Chart (2018)	Peak position
Canadian Albums (Billboard)	35
Scottish Albums (OCC)	100
UK Country Albums (OCC)	4
US Billboard 200	7
US Top Country Albums (Billboard)	1

=== Year-end charts ===
Chart (2018)	Position
US Top Country Albums (Billboard)	47
Chart (2019)	Position
US Top Country Albums (Billboard)	52

=== Singles ===
Year	Single	Peak chart positions				Sales	Certifications
Year	Single	US Country	US Country Airplay	US	CAN Country	Sales	Certifications
2017	"Five More Minutes"	4	1	44	2	US: 2,000,000	RIAA: 3× Platinum; MC: 2× Platinum
2018	"This Is It"	3	1	42	2	US: 1,000,000	RIAA: Platinum; MC: Platinum
2019	"In Between"	12	1	53	12	US: –	RIAA: Gold; MC: Gold

== Certifications ==
Certifications for Seasons Change
Region	Certification	Certified units/sales
Canada (Music Canada)	Gold	40,000^{‡}
United States (RIAA)	Gold	500,000^{‡}
^{‡} Sales+streaming figures based on certification alone.
