= This Is It (Scotty McCreery song) =

2018 song by Scotty McCreery

Single by Scotty McCreery

from the album Seasons Change
- Released: March 9, 2018
- Recorded: 2018
- Genre: Country
- Length: 3:50
- Label: Triple Tigers
- Songwriters: Scotty McCreery; Frank Rogers; Aaron Eshuis
- Producers: Frank Rogers; Aaron Eshuis; Derek Wells

Scotty McCreery singles chronology
"Five More Minutes" (2017)	"This Is It" (2018)	"In Between" (2019)

"This Is It" is a song co-written and recorded by American country music singer Scotty McCreery. It was released to digital retailers on March 9, 2018, and was released to radio on May 7, 2018. The song is the second single released from his fourth studio album Seasons Change (2018).

== History ==
McCreery wrote the song with Frank Rogers and Aaron Eshuis two weeks before proposing to his longtime girlfriend. He sang the song at his wedding reception.

== Music video ==
The song's music video was directed by Jeff Ray. The music video features real-life footage from McCreery's wedding.

== Commercial performance ==
The song was certified Platinum by the RIAA for combined streams and sales of 1,000,000 units on July 31, 2019. It has sold 115,000 copies in the United States as of April 2019.

== Charts ==
=== Weekly charts ===
Chart (2018–2019)	Peak position
Canada Hot 100 (Billboard)	87
Canada Country (Billboard)	2
US Billboard Hot 100	42
US Country Airplay (Billboard)	1
US Hot Country Songs (Billboard)	3

=== Year-end charts ===
Chart (2018)	Position
US Hot Country Songs (Billboard)	87
Chart (2019)	Position
US Country Airplay (Billboard)	9
US Hot Country Songs (Billboard)	28

== Certifications ==
Region	Certification	Certified units/sales
Canada (Music Canada)	Platinum	80,000^{‡}
United States (RIAA)	Platinum	1,000,000^{‡}
^{‡} Sales+streaming figures based on certification alone.
