= Bottle Rockets =

2025 single by Scotty McCreery featuring Hootie & the Blowfish

Single by Scotty McCreery featuring Hootie & the Blowfish

from the album 15
- Released: May 15, 2025
- Recorded: 2025
- Genre: Country
- Length: 3:55
- Label: Triple Tigers
- Songwriters: Scotty McCreery; Frank Rogers; Brent Anderson; Derek George; Darius Rucker; Jeremy Bussey; Mark Bryan; Dean Felber; Monty Criswell; Bobby Hamrick; Jim Sonefeld
- Producer: Frank Rogers

Scotty McCreery singles chronology
"Fall of Summer" (2024)	"Bottle Rockets" (2025)

Hootie & the Blowfish singles chronology
"For What It's Worth" (2024)	"Bottle Rockets" (2025)

Music video
- "Bottle Rockets" on YouTube

"Bottle Rockets" is a song by American country music singer Scotty McCreery. It was released on May 15, 2025 as the lead single from his compilation album 15. It features American rock band Hootie & the Blowfish and borrows some music and lyrics from their song "Hold My Hand".

== Background ==
The song was conceived in January 2025 during a writing retreat at McCreery's cabin in the North Carolina mountains, which involved songwriters Frank Rogers, Brent Anderson, Derek George, Jeremy Bussey and Bobby Hamrick. Bussey did not attend in-person because he was ill with the flu, but participated remotely from his laptop. The group began working on a summer song, since McCreery's label was asking him for a summer-themed EP. McCreery mentioned his love for Hootie & the Blowfish and had an idea to collaborate with its lead vocalist Darius Rucker, who was a friend and frequent collaborator of Rogers. The group eventually decided to create a nostalgic track that would build into a Hootie & the Blowfish song during the post-chorus by the narrator recalling "the smile on her face when she'd make me break out my guitar and play..." They started strumming a tune that would eventually become "Bottle Rockets" and were uncertain which Hootie & the Blowfish song to reference until Rogers began singing "Hold My Hand" at the end of the chorus that they had already written. Along the way, they recorded a demo with McCreery on lead vocals and the others providing harmony vocals.

McCreery reached out to Rucker, and then Rogers reached out to the band about the collaboration. Hootie & the Blowfish agreed to sing the song on the track. While McCreery and his team were in the studio tracking for the new EP, Mark Bryan, Dean Felber and Jim Sonefeld were together in the studio and called, asked McCreery's group to record with them at that moment. They assembled the band and picked a tempo and key for them. Hootie & the Blowfish recorded their part before the song was even recorded. Bryan, Felber and Sonefeld re-recorded their signature group harmonies from "Hold My Hand" at Bryan's studio on the South Carolina coast, while Rucker traveled to Nashville, Tennessee from London, where he now lives, and recorded his part in Rogers' home studio, where McCreery records his music.

McCreery has also said, "This song takes me back to those summers of having fun with no responsibilities with good times and good tunes. For me growing up in the Carolinas, Hootie & the Blowfish were just massive and such a huge part of great summers growing up. That's what this song 'Bottle Rockets' is about."

== Composition ==
"Bottle Rockets" is a mid-tempo country song. In the lyrics, Scotty McCreery fondly recalls a summer memory with his lover at the beach, which he describes in the chorus: "Bottle rockets in the sky / Bare feet in the sand / Bonfire in her eyes / Cold beer in the can / Moonlight on the waves / Her kiss in the dark". He then mentions playing "Hold My Hand" on the guitar, followed by Hootie & the Blowfish singing the chorus of that song.

== Music video ==
The music video for "Bottle Rockets" premiered on September 19, 2025, and was directed by Jeff Ray. Filmed on the Isle of Palms, South Carolina, it sees the artists strumming their instruments around a fire at the beach, with ocean waves in the background. At sunset, they launch some bottle rockets into the sky.

== Commercial performance ==
"Bottle Rockets" reached No. 1 on the Billboard Country Airplay chart dated October 4, 2025, becoming McCreery's sixth No. 1 single, his first since "Damn Strait" in July 2022, and Hootie & the Blowfish's first. Additionally, this accomplishment made Hootie & the Blowfish lead singer Darius Rucker, who had achieved nine number one singles as a solo artist up to this point, the second artist in that chart's history to top the chart as both a solo artist and as a member of a duo or group.

== Charts ==
=== Weekly charts ===
Weekly chart performance for "Bottle Rockets"
Chart (2025)	Peak position
Canada Hot 100 (Billboard)	43
Canada Country (Billboard)	1
UK Country Airplay (Radiomonitor)	4
US Billboard Hot 100	32
US Country Airplay (Billboard)	1
US Hot Country Songs (Billboard)	6

=== Year-end charts ===
Year-end chart performance for "Bottle Rockets"
Chart (2025)	Position
US Country Airplay (Billboard)	29
US Hot Country Songs (Billboard)	40

== Certifications ==
Certifications for "Bottle Rockets"
Region	Certification	Certified units/sales
Canada (Music Canada)	Gold	40,000^{‡}
United States (RIAA)	Gold	500,000^{‡}
^{‡} Sales+streaming figures based on certification alone.
