= Damn Strait =

2021 single by Scotty McCreery

Single by Scotty McCreery

from the album Same Truck
- Released: October 18, 2021
- Genre: Country
- Length: 3:50
- Label: Triple Tigers
- Songwriters: Jim Collins; Trent Tomlinson
- Producers: Frank Rogers; Aaron Eshuis; Derek Wells

Scotty McCreery singles chronology
"You Time" (2020)	"Damn Strait" (2021)	"It Matters to Her" (2022)

Music video
- "Damn Strait" on YouTube

"Damn Strait" is a song by American country music singer Scotty McCreery. It was released on October 18, 2021, as the second single from his fifth studio album Same Truck. The song was written by Jim Collins and Trent Tomlinson, and produced by Frank Rogers, Aaron Eshuis, and Derek Wells.

== Background ==
"Damn Strait" is a tribute to country music singer George Strait. McCreery told Everything Nash the story behind the song: "I was writing songs left and right, we had the songs put on there, but for me, when I heard a song 'Damn Strait', I immediately raised my hand and said, 'Me, me, me.' It's such a cool song. It's so cleverly written. And obviously I'm a massive George Strait fan. It just sounded so much like me." When talking about Strait, McCreery said in a press release: "I grew up as a huge George Strait fan, and when I heard this song, I raised my hand to say, 'I want this one.' Every country fan has a George Strait story, and everyone has a memory attached to their favorite songs."

== Content ==
Aaron Ryan of Whiskey Riff described the song as "a heartbreaker that tells the story of a relationship gone bad – a relationship that, like many in the '80s and '90s, was filled with George Strait tunes as its soundtrack." Lauren Boisvert of Outsider wrote that it is "a picture of a relationship ended and the scars that music can leave on you when you associate it with a certain time or person in your life" that quotes the George Strait songs "Nobody in His Right Mind Would've Left Her" (1986), "Marina del Rey" (1982), "Blue Clear Sky" (1996), "Give It Away" (2006), "I Hate Everything" (2004), and "Baby Blue" (1988).

== Critical reception ==
Billy Dukes of Taste of Country called the title "clever" and McCreery's delivery "warm and personal", writing that the "twist on the phrase 'Damn Strait' [...] takes this song to a new level."

== Music video ==
The music video premiered on February 8, 2022. It was directed by Jeff Ray and filmed at the historic Gruene Hall in New Braunfels, Texas, a venue frequently played by Strait in his early career before he signed his record deal.

== Live performance ==
On October 19, 2021, McCreery performed the song on The Kelly Clarkson Show.

== Chart performance ==
"Damn Strait" peaked at number one on the Billboard Country Airplay chart dated July 23, 2022, holding that position for three weeks and becoming McCreery's fifth consecutive number one single on that chart. In addition, it peaked at number 32 on the Billboard Hot 100, becoming his first Top 40 single on that chart since his debut single "I Love You This Big" peaked at number 11 in 2011.

== Charts ==
=== Weekly charts ===
Weekly chart performance for "Damn Strait"
Chart (2021–2022)	Peak position
Canada Hot 100 (Billboard)	56
Canada Country (Billboard)	2
US Billboard Hot 100	32
US Country Airplay (Billboard)	1
US Hot Country Songs (Billboard)	6

=== Year-end charts ===
Year-end chart performance for "Damn Strait"
Chart (2022)	Position
US Billboard Hot 100	93
US Country Airplay (Billboard)	4
US Hot Country Songs (Billboard)	21

== Certifications ==
Certifications for "Damn Strait"
Region	Certification	Certified units/sales
Canada (Music Canada)	Platinum	80,000^{‡}
United States (RIAA)	Platinum	1,000,000^{‡}
^{‡} Sales+streaming figures based on certification alone.

== Release history ==
Release history for "Damn Strait"
Region	Date	Format	Label	Ref.
Various	September 17, 2021	Digital download; streaming	Triple Tigers	
United States	October 18, 2021	Country radio	Triple Tigers	
