= Cab in a Solo =

Single by Scotty McCreery

from the album Rise & Fall
- Released: August 21, 2023
- Genre: Country
- Length: 3:45
- Label: Triple Tigers
- Songwriters: Brent Anderson; Scotty McCreery; Frank Rogers
- Producers: Frank Rogers; Aaron Eshuis; Derek Wells

Scotty McCreery singles chronology
"It Matters to Her" (2022)	"Cab in a Solo" (2023)	"Fall of Summer" (2024)

Music video
- "Cab in a Solo" on YouTube

"Cab in a Solo" is a song by American country music singer Scotty McCreery. He wrote the song with Brent Anderson and Frank Rogers. It was released on August 21, 2023 as the lead single from his sixth studio album Rise & Fall.

== Content ==
McCreery co-wrote "Cab in a Solo" with Brent Anderson and Frank Rogers, the latter of whom also produced it with Aaron Eshuis and Derek Wells. It was written during a retreat in the mountains of North Carolina and is described as a heartbreak song that evokes '90s country nostalgia in its traditional sound.

Drawing comparisons to '90s country songs like Wynonna Judd's "I Saw the Light" and Rhett Akins's "That Ain't My Truck", the premise of the song finds McCreery's character looking to rekindle the romance with his girlfriend, following a breakup, with an expensive bottle of Cabernet Sauvignon, but he finds that she's already moved on when he pulls up to her house to see more than one shadow on her bedroom wall. It creates the song's hook of drowning his sorrows: "Drinkin' cab in a solo / Solo in the cab of my truck."

McCreery embarked on his headlining Cab in a Solo Tour in January 2024.

== Chart performance ==
"Cab in a Solo" peaked at number two on the Billboard Country Airplay chart dated May 4, 2024. It did not enter the Billboard Hot 100, but peaked at number one on the Bubbling Under Hot 100 chart, an extension of the Hot 100.

== Charts ==
=== Weekly charts ===
Weekly chart performance for "Cab in a Solo"
Chart (2023–2024)	Peak position
Canada Country (Billboard)	14
US Bubbling Under Hot 100 (Billboard)	1
US Country Airplay (Billboard)	2
US Hot Country Songs (Billboard)	20

=== Year-end charts ===
2024 year-end chart performance for "Cab in a Solo"
Chart (2024)	Position
US Country Airplay (Billboard)	33
US Hot Country Songs (Billboard)	84
