= Rise & Fall (album) =

Studio album by Scotty McCreery
- Released: May 10, 2024
- Recorded: Blackbird (Nashville); The Vault (Nashville); Spirit (Nashville)
- Genre: Country
- Length: 45:28
- Label: Triple Tigers
- Producers: Frank Rogers; Aaron Eshuis; Derek Wells

Scotty McCreery chronology
| Same Truck (2021) | Rise & Fall (2024) |

Singles from Rise & Fall
- 1. "Cab in a Solo" Released: August 21, 2023; 2. "Fall of Summer" Released: May 28, 2024

Rise & Fall is the sixth studio album by American country music artist Scotty McCreery. It was released on May 10, 2024, via Triple Tigers. "Cab in a Solo" was released as its lead single in August 2023.

== Content ==
McCreery co-wrote 12 of the 13 tracks on Rise & Fall. Frank Rogers, Aaron Eshuis, and Derek Wells produced the record.

McCreery described Rise & Fall as his "favorite album [he's] made so far" and while the record explores a multitude of themes, the birth of his son in October 2022 served as a great inspiration for some of the songs on the project, reflecting the current stage of his life.

"Cab in a Solo" served as the album's lead single and was released on August 21, 2023. It reached a peak of number 2 on the Billboard Country Airplay chart. "Fall of Summer" was released on May 28, 2024, as the second single from the album.

"Can't Pass the Bar" and "Love Like This" were also released as promotional singles ahead of the album release.

== Track listing ==
Rise & Fall track listing
| No. | Title | Writer(s) | Length |
|---|---|---|---|
| 1. | "Little More Gone" | Scotty McCreery; Brent Anderson; Jeremy Bussey; Monty Criswell; Derek George; Bobby Hamrick; Frank Rogers | 3:07 |
| 2. | "Cab in a Solo" | McCreery; Anderson; Rogers | 3:46 |
| 3. | "Lonely" | McCreery; Anderson; Bussey; Criswell; George; Hamrick; Rogers | 4:32 |
| 4. | "Can't Pass the Bar" | McCreery; Anderson; Cale Dodds; Rogers | 2:41 |
| 5. | "Hey Rose" | Jay Brunswick; Bussey; Hamrick | 3:32 |
| 6. | "Fall of Summer" | McCreery; Anderson; Criswell; George; Rogers | 3:44 |
| 7. | "Love Like This" | McCreery; Aaron Eshuis; Rogers | 3:33 |
| 8. | "Slow Dance" | McCreery; Anderson; Criswell; George | 3:18 |
| 9. | "No Country for Old Men" | McCreery; Anderson; Criswell; George; Rogers | 3:56 |
| 10. | "And Countin'" | McCreery; Bussey; Hamrick; Rogers | 3:12 |
| 11. | "Stuck Behind a Tractor" | McCreery; Rhett Akins; Chase McGill | 3:10 |
| 12. | "Red Letter Blueprint" | McCreery; Anderson; Bussey; Criswell; George | 3:52 |
| 13. | "Porch" | McCreery; Greylan James; Heather Morgan | 3:05 |
| Total length: | | | 45:28 |

== Personnel ==
Musicians

- Scotty McCreery – lead vocals
- Jimmie Lee Sloas – bass
- Mike Johnson – pedal steel, Dobro
- Evan Hutchings – drums, percussion
- Ilya Toshinsky – acoustic guitar, bouzouki, resonator guitar, banjo, mandolin
- Bobby Hamrick – acoustic guitar
- Derek Wells – electric guitar, baritone guitar, sitar, tic-tac guitar, Dobro, programming
- Justin Niebank – programming
- Wes Hightower – background vocals
- David Dorn – B-3, synthesizer, piano, clavinet, Wurlitzer, strings
- Aaron Eshuis – programming
- Larry Franklin – fiddle
- Frank Rogers – programming, electric guitar, beer can, background vocals
- Jellyroll Johnson – harmonica
- Tyrus Sass – piano
- The Lonely Choir – gang vocals on "Lonely Ain't Lonely"

Technical

- Frank Rogers – production
- Derek Wells – production, additional recording
- Aaron Eshuis – production
- Andrew Mendelson – mastering
- Justin Niebank – mixing
- Drew Bollman – engineering, additional mix engineering
- Brian David Willis – digital editing
- Frank Rogers – additional recording
- Zach Kuhlman – engineering assistance
- Joey Stanca – engineering assistance

Visuals

- Jeff Ray – photography
- Joshua Sage Newman – packaging art direction
- Abby Murdock – packaging art direction
- Anthony Formisano – packaging design
- Tanner Germany – packaging design

== Charts ==
Chart performance for Rise & Fall
| Chart (2024) | Peak position |
|---|---|
| Scottish Albums (Official Charts) | 91 |
| UK Album Downloads (Official Charts) | 63 |
| UK Country Albums (Official Charts) | 6 |
| UK Independent Albums (Official Charts) | 33 |
| US Billboard 200 | 128 |
| US Independent Albums (Billboard) | 22 |
| US Top Country Albums (Billboard) | 25 |

== Accolades ==
Year-end lists
| Publication | Rank | List |
|---|---|---|
| Rolling Stone | 12 | The 30 Best Country Albums of 2024 |
