= Same Truck =

Studio album by Scotty McCreery
- Released: September 17, 2021
- Genre: Country
- Length: 41:50
- Label: Triple Tigers
- Producers: Frank Rogers (all tracks); Aaron Eshuis (all tracks except 6); Derek Wells (all tracks except 6)

Scotty McCreery chronology
Seasons Change (2018)	Same Truck (2021)	Rise & Fall (2024)

Alternative cover
- Cover for limited edition.

Singles from Same Truck
- 1. "You Time" Released: September 23, 2020; 2. "Damn Strait" Released: October 18, 2021; 3. "It Matters to Her" Released: September 12, 2022

Same Truck is the fifth studio album by American country music artist Scotty McCreery. Its lead single, "You Time", is McCreery's fourth consecutive single to reach number one on the US Country Airplay chart.

== Content ==
The album is the second to be released by McCreery under Triple Tigers. McCreery co-wrote ten of the album's twelve tracks.

== Release and promotion ==
Same Truck was released on September 17, 2021, through Triple Tigers.

McCreery appeared on Today with Hoda & Jenna on December 10, 2020, and performed "You Time". On October 19, 2021, he appeared on The Kelly Clarkson Show and performed "Damn Strait".

== Critical reception ==
Professional ratings
Review scores
Source	Rating
AllMusic	3/5 stars

Stephen Thomas Erlewine of AllMusic gave the album three and a half stars out of five saying, "McCreery has an easy touch -- where he used to lean into his influences on his ear lies records, he leans back now -- which gives these mellow, melodic tunes a gentle, welcoming feel." Pip Ellwood-Hughes of Entertainment Focus wrote that the album's lyrics "cover the usual topics of trucks, romance and small towns" and that it "isn't a reinvention of the wheel but it's designed to hit McCreery's hardcore fanbase, which it will most definitely do."

== Commercial performance ==
Same Truck debuted at number 10 on the Top Country Albums chart, marking it as his fifth consecutive album to debut within the top 10 on the chart.

== Singles ==
"You Time" was released as the album's lead single on September 23, 2020. The song reached number one on the US Country Airplay Chart, and number seven on the Hot Country Songs chart. It has been certified Gold by the RIAA.

"Damn Strait" was released on October 18, 2021, as the second single. It peaked at number one on the Country Airplay Chart where it stayed for three weeks. It reached number six on the Hot Country Songs chart. It was also certified Platinum by the RIAA.

"It Matters to Her" was released as the third and final single on September 22, 2022. It peaked at number three on the Country Airplay chart, and number 13 on the Hot Country Songs chart.

"Why You Gotta Be Like That", "Nothin' Right", and "Small Town Story" were also issued as promotional singles, the latter two ahead of the re-issued deluxe edition, which was released on November 18, 2022.

== Track listing ==
No.	Title	Writer(s)	Length
1.	"Same Truck"	Scotty McCreery; Ashley Gorley; Taylor Phillips; Zach Crowell	3:34
2.	"You Time"	McCreery; Frank Rogers; Aaron Eshuis	3:12
3.	"It Matters to Her"	McCreery; Lee Thomas Miller; Rhett Akins	2:51
4.	"Damn Strait"	Jim Collins; Trent Tomlinson	3:50
5.	"It'll Grow on Ya"	Jeremy Bussey; Jason Blaine; Phillips; Adam Wood	3:21
6.	"The Waiter"	McCreery; Matthew West; Rogers	4:28
7.	"Why You Gotta Be Like That"	McCreery; Jordan Schmidt; James McNair	2:50
8.	"Home"	McCreery; Rogers; Brent Anderson; Tammi Kidd	3:35
9.	"Carolina to Me"	McCreery; Bussey; Phillips	3:47
10.	"Small Town Girl"	McCreery; Gorley; Crowell	3:04
11.	"That Kind of Fire"	McCreery; Josh Hoge; Matt McVaney; Justin Wilson	2:54
12.	"How Ya Doin' Up There"	McCreery; Tyler Reeve; Derek George; Monty Criswell	4:19
Total length:			41:50

Same Truck: The Deluxe Album
No.	Title	Writer(s)	Length
13.	"Falling For a Stranger"	Eshuis; Travis Wood; Hannah Ellis	3:01
14.	"Here and Ready"	Abe Stoklasa; Sarah Buxton; Mikey Reeves	3:13
15.	"Nothin' Right"	McCreery; Schmidt; Jared Mullins; McNair	3:00
16.	"On It"	McCreery; Jessi Alexander; Jonathan Singleton; Rogers	3:01
17.	"Live a Little"	McCreery; Eshuis; Blake Chaffin	3:57
18.	"Small Town Story"	McCreery; Gorley; Crowell	2:52

== Personnel ==
Credits adapted from AllMusic.

- Scotty McCreery – vocals
- David Dorn – acoustic piano, Wurlitzer electric piano, synthesizers, Hammond B3 organ, accordion
- Gordon Mote – acoustic piano
- Aaron Eshuis – programming, backing vocals
- Justin Niebank – programming
- Derek Wells – programming, electric guitars, slide guitar
- J.T. Corenflos – electric guitars
- Ilya Toshinsky – acoustic guitars, banjo, bouzouki, dulcimer, mandolin
- Jimmie Lee Sloas – bass guitar
- Mike Johnson – pedal steel guitar
- Shannon Forrest – drums, percussion
- Wes Hightower – backing vocals
- Russell Terrell – backing vocals

=== Production ===
- Frank Rogers – producer, additional recording
- Aaron Eshuis – producer (1–5, 7–18)
- Derek Wells – producer (1–5, 7–18)
- Justin Niebank – recording (1–5, 7–18), mixing
- Richard Barrow – recording (6)
- Sean Badum – recording assistant (1–5, 7–18)
- Bryce Roberts – recording assistant (1–5, 7–18)
- Beau Maxwell – recording assistant (6)
- Drew Bollman – mix assistant
- Brian David Willis – digital editing
- Andrew Mendelson – mastering at Georgetown Masters (Nashville, Tennessee)
- Scott Johnson – production assistant
- Parker Foote – art direction
- Joshua Sage Newman – art direction
- Ryon Nishimori — art direction
- st8mnt – design
- Jeff Ray – photography

== Charts ==
Chart (2021)	Peak position
US Billboard 200	86
US Top Country Albums (Billboard)	10
US Independent Albums (Billboard)	13
