= Christmas with Scotty McCreery =

Studio album by Scotty McCreery
- Released: October 16, 2012
- Studio: Starstruck Studios and Sound Stage Studios (Nashville, Tennessee)
- Genre: Christmas; country
- Length: 37:19
- Label: Mercury Nashville; 19
- Producer: Mark Bright

Scotty McCreery chronology
Clear as Day (2011)	Christmas with Scotty McCreery (2012)	See You Tonight (2013)

Christmas with Scotty McCreery is the Christmas album by season ten American Idol winner Scotty McCreery. The album was released on October 16, 2012, in the United States by Mercury Nashville. The album was certified Gold on November 26, 2012.

== Background ==
In July 2012, Scotty McCreery revealed that he was working on a Christmas album. He indicated that he had always wanted to make a Christmas album, and had talked about it for about a year before it was given the go-ahead by his label. The album contains many of the standard Christmas songs, as well as two original Christmas songs - "Christmas in Heaven" and "Christmas Comin' Round Again". He described "Christmas in Heaven" as his favorite song on the album. McCreery revealed that he was writing a song called "Christmas in Heaven" about his grandfather, who died while he was getting ready for the album, but received a song with the same title and opted to record that instead.

The album was produced by Mark Bright, who was also the producer of McCreery's first album, Clear as Day. The Christmas album was released on October 16, 2012, in the United States. It was included in the Scotty McCreery QVC Bundle, which also contains Clear as Day, and was released on October 23 through QVC.

== Critical reception ==
Professional ratings
Review scores
Source	Rating
Allmusic	3/5 stars
Taste of Country	3/5 stars
Roughstock	4.5/5 stars

The album received generally positive reviews by the critics. Stephen Thomas Erlewine of Allmusic thought that to release a Christmas album at this point of his career "may be a tad speedy but a festive collection is a softball pitch up the middle for McCreery, one that the cornpone singer can hit clear out of the park." Billy Duke of Taste of Country considered it a "consistent project that takes few chances, but offers 11 pleasant recordings to easily slip into one's yearly holiday playlist." In similar vein, Matt Bjorke of Roughstock thought the album is "largely as warm and familiar as a cup of Hot Cocoa. That is, it's not the kind of groundbreaking all-new Christmas recording but it is well-made and should be an easy addition to any Christmas music fan's collection of yuletide music."

== Chart and sales performance ==
Christmas with Scotty McCreery debuted at No. 4 on the Billboard 200, with first week sales of 41,000 copies. It also charted in No. 2 in the Top Country Albums and No. 1 in the Top Holiday Albums charts. As of December 2013, the album has sold 382,000 copies in the US.

The Scotty McCreery QVC Bundle released through QVC sold 5,000 copies the first week and reached No. 93 on the Billboard 200.

== Track listing ==
No.	Title	Writer(s)	Length
1.	"Let It Snow"	Sammy Cahn; Jule Styne	2:03
2.	"First Noel"	Traditional	3:38
3.	"Jingle Bells"	James Lord Pierpont	3:17
4.	"Holly Jolly Christmas"	Johnny Marks	2:28
5.	"Winter Wonderland"	Felix Bernard; Richard B. Smith	2:34
6.	"Christmas in Heaven"	Paul Marino; Jeremy Johnson	3:31
7.	"Mary, Did You Know?"	Buddy Greene; Mark Lowry	3:22
8.	"Christmas Comin' Round Again"	Ashley Gorley; Hillary Lindsey	4:06
9.	"O Holy Night"	Adolphe Adam, Placide Cappeau	4:45
10.	"The Christmas Song"	Mel Tormé; Robert Wells	3:51
11.	"Santa Claus Is Back in Town"	Jerry Leiber; Mike Stoller	3:35
Total length:			37:19

== Personnel ==
Adapted from liner notes.

- Scotty McCreery – lead vocals
- Jimmy Nichols – keyboards, acoustic piano
- Brent Mason – electric guitars
- Danny Rader – acoustic guitars
- Tony Lucido – bass guitar
- Paul Leim – drums
- Eric Darken – percussion (1, 3–9)
- Aubrey Haynie – fiddle (1, 3, 5)
- Jonathan Yudkin – arco bass (6, 7), cello (6, 7), harp (6, 7), viola (6, 7), violin (6, 7), string arrangements (6, 7)
- Charlie Judge – strings (9), string arrangements (9)
- Wes Hightower – backing vocals (2, 3, 5–8, 10, 11)
- Jenifer Wrinkle – backing vocals (2, 3, 5–8, 10, 11)

=== Production ===
- Brian Wright – A&R
- Mark Bright – producer
- Derek Bason – recording, mixing
- Chris Small – recording, mixing, digital editing
- Adam Ayan – mastering at Gateway Mastering (Portland, Maine)
- Mike "Frog" Griffith – production coordinator
- Kirsten Wines – musical assistance
- Craig Allen – design
- Andrew Southam – photography

== Charts and certifications ==
=== Weekly Charts ===
Chart (2012)	Peak position
US Billboard 200	4
US Billboard Top Country Albums	2
US Billboard Top Holiday Albums	1

=== Year-End Charts ===
Chart (2012)	Peak position
US Billboard Top Country Albums	48

Chart (2013)	Peak position
US Billboard 200	98
US Billboard Top Country Albums	25

=== Certifications ===
Country (Provider)	Certification
United States (RIAA)	Gold
