= Clear as Day =

Studio album by Scotty McCreery
- Released: October 4, 2011
- Recorded: May – July 2011
- Studios: Starstruck Studios (Nashville, Tennessee); Dead Aunt Thelma's Studio (Portland, Oregon); Nightbird Recording Studios (Hollywood, California); Record Plant (Los Angeles, California); Threshold Sound and Interscope Studios (Santa Monica, California)
- Genre: Country
- Length: 40:49
- Labels: Mercury Nashville; 19
- Producer: Mark Bright

Scotty McCreery chronology
Clear as Day (2011)	Christmas with Scotty McCreery (2012)

Singles from Clear as Day
- 1. "I Love You This Big" Released: May 25, 2011; 2. "The Trouble with Girls" Released: August 30, 2011; 3. "Water Tower Town" Released: April 9, 2012

Clear as Day is the debut studio album by season ten American Idol winner Scotty McCreery, released on October 4, 2011, in the United States.

== Background ==
Scotty McCreery began working on his album soon after he was crowned the winner of the tenth season of American Idol. McCreery described the album as having "some old country influences and elements" that he grew up with, such as Hank Williams, Conway Twitty and Merle Haggard, but "it also has a contemporary feel with fun up-tempo songs." He said the title track, "Clear as Day", is one of his favorites on the album and he loves the message behind the song. The album includes a cover of a song by Keith Urban, "Walkin’ the Country", released when he was in the band The Ranch.

== Singles ==
- "I Love You This Big" was released as the debut and coronation single by Scotty McCreery. It debuted and peaked at number 11 on the Billboard Hot 100. It also peaked at number 15 on the Hot Country Songs chart.
- "The Trouble with Girls" was released as the second single from the album, which premiered on radio on August 30, 2011, and released onto iTunes and Amazon.com on September 1, 2011. It debuted at number 84 on the Billboard Hot 100 and had since reached number 55.
- "Water Tower Town" was released as the third single from the album for country radio on April 9, 2012. McCreery subsequently reworked the lyrics as "Bojangles Town" for a series of TV advertisements about the Bojangles' Famous Chicken 'n Biscuits restaurant chain.

== Reception ==
Professional ratings
Review scores
Source	Rating
AllMusic	2/5 stars
Rolling Stone	2/5 stars
USA Today	2/4 stars

Upon its release, Clear as Day received generally mixed reviews from most music critics. At Metacritic, which assigns a normalized rating out of 100 to reviews from mainstream critics, the album received an average score of 51, based on 8 reviews, which indicates "Mixed or average reviews".

Jerry Shriver of USA Today gave the album 2 stars out of 4, saying that the album was "strictly paint-by-numbers country, with some mildly interesting colors occasionally dabbed inside the lines." Stephen Thomas Erlewine of AllMusic gave it two stars out of five, saying that although some of the songs had "signs of life" to them, "the songs and production demand that all energy come from young Scotty, who amiably sleepwalks through the tunes, expecting his 'aw shucks' smile will translate onto record. That it doesn’t is not necessarily on his shoulders -- it’s better to place the blame on the machine, here run by producer Mark Bright." Rolling Stone critic Caryn Ganz also gave the album two stars out of five, stating that "his debut – a ho-hum jaunt through an America full of dog-eared Bibles, rugged pickup trucks and girls 'hot as July, sweet as sunshine' – works overtime playing up his wide-eyed charm." Chris Willman, writing for Reuters, gave it a mixed review, singling out "The Trouble With Girls" as having "sweetly playful lyrics" but adding that "the sappy music seems to have been written for a different set of words, as if McCreery were supposed to be singing about Jesus taking the wheel, not chick magnetism."

Melinda Newman, writing for HitFix, gave it a B− rating, saying "McCreery has a voice meant for country. It’s deep, resonant, and for someone so young, he also had a good command of nuance...the sound is so clean and clear, if it were a floor, you could eat off it...there is no attempt whatsoever to make any song here palatable for a country crossover to pop — and that is a compliment." Joey Guerra, writing for the Houston Chronicle, gave it a positive review, noting that "there are a surprising and refreshing number of uptempo numbers, and the entire thing clearly establishes his persona, unlike so many post-Idol debut efforts." Additionally, he said that of the two albums being released by the 2011 American Idol finalists (referring to Lauren Alaina's debut album, which would be released a week after Clear As Day), "(Clear As Day) is clearly the stronger of the two, and it's no surprise. He's a more natural performer and seems unfettered by NashVegas trappings or mainstream radio cynicism. Country music just seems to be an extension of who he is. The songs are age-appropriate, heartfelt and sincere.".

== Chart performance ==
Clear as Day debuted at number one on the Billboard 200, with first week sales of 197,000 copies, subsequently becoming the first debut album from an American Idol winner to top the chart since Ruben Studdard's Soulful in 2003. McCreery broke records as the first country act to debut at number one with their first studio album, and at 18 years old, the youngest man to open at the top of the chart with their debut release; the record had previously been held by Omarion, who was 20 when O debuted at number one in 2005.

As of April 2013, the album had sold 1,166,000 copies in the United States, having been certified platinum on January 6, 2012.

== Track listing ==
No.	Title	Writer(s)	Length
1.	"Out of Summertime"	Tim Nichols; Jonathan Singleton	3:42
2.	"I Love You This Big"	Ester Dean; Brett James; Jay Smith; Ronnie Jackson	4:06
3.	"Clear as Day"	Casey Beathard; Phil O'Donnell; Adam Wheeler	3:56
4.	"The Trouble with Girls"	Phillip White; Chris Tompkins	3:49
5.	"Water Tower Town"	Cole Swindell; Tammi Kidd; Lynn Hutton	2:44
6.	"Walk in the Country"	Keith Urban; Vernon Rust	2:59
7.	"Better than That"	Chris DeStefano; Jess Cates; Craig Wiseman	3:10
8.	"Write My Number on Your Hand"	Thomas Rhett; Jeremy Stover; Jamie Paulin	2:59
9.	"Dirty Dishes"	Neil Thrasher; Michael Dulaney; Tony Martin	3:36
10.	"You Make That Look Good"	Rhett Akins; Lee Thomas Miller	3:01
11.	"Back on the Ground"	Thrasher; Beathard; Martin	3:19
12.	"That Old King James"	White; Mark Nesler	3:29
Total length:			40:49

== Personnel ==
Adapted from Clear As Day liner notes.

- Scotty McCreery – lead vocals
- Matt Rollings –Hammond B3 organ (1, 2)
- Charlie Judge – keyboards (3, 5–12), synthesizers (4), programming (4), string arrangements (4), string conductor (4), squeezebox (12)
- Gordon Mote – acoustic piano (3, 5, 9–11)
- Jimmy Nichols – acoustic piano (4, 6–8, 12)
- Tim Pierce – electric guitar (1, 2), high-string acoustic guitar (1)
- Greg Leisz – acoustic guitar (1, 2), banjo (1), steel guitar (1, 2)
- Ilya Toshinsky – acoustic guitar (3–12), mandolin (3, 9), resonator guitar (10)
- Brent Mason – electric guitar (3–12)
- Mike Johnson – steel guitar (4, 7, 8, 12), pedal steel guitar (6)
- Leland Sklar – bass guitar (1, 2)
- Jimmie Lee Sloas – bass guitar (3–12)
- Jerry Roe – drums (1, 2)
- Paul Leim – drums (3–12)
- Eric Darken – percussion (3–5, 7, 9–11)
- Joe Spivey – fiddle (3, 9)
- Mark Bright – string arrangements (4)
- Carl Gorodetzky – string contractor (4)
- The Nashville String Machine – strings (4)
- Jonathan Yudkin – cello (9), contrabass (9), viola (9), violin (9), string arrangements (9)
- Perry Coleman – backing vocals (1, 4, 5, 9, 10)
- Destinee Monroe – backing vocals (2)
- Paris Monroe – backing vocals (2)
- Wes Hightower – backing vocals (3, 6–8, 12)
- Jennifer Wrinkle – backing vocals (5, 7–11)
- Neil Thrasher – backing vocals (11)

=== Production ===
- Larry Jackson, Iain Pirie and Brian Wright – A&R
- Mark Bright – producer
- Derek Bason – recording, mixing (1, 3–12), digital editing
- Mitch Kenny – additional recording, recording assistant
- Todd Tidwell – additional recording, mixing (2)
- Chris Ashburn – recording assistant, mix assistant (1, 3–12)
- Angelo Caputo – recording assistant
- Josh Millman – recording assistant
- Chris Small – recording assistant, mix assistant (2)
- Mike Gaydusek – recording assistant (4, 5, 11)
- Juliette Amoroso – recording assistant (5, 10)
- Christopher Rowe – digital editing
- Adam Ayan – mastering at Gateway Mastering (Portland, Maine)
- Mike "Frog" Griffith – production coordinator
- Kirsten Wines – production assistant
- Andrew Southam – photography
- Cori Bardo – hair, make-up
- Rita Rago – wardrobe stylist
- 19 Entertainment and XIX Entertainment – management

== Charts ==
=== Weekly charts ===
Chart (2011)	Peak position
Canadian Albums Chart	4
New Zealand Albums Chart	32
South African Albums Chart	19
UK Country Artist Albums Chart	5
US Billboard 200	1
US Billboard Top Country Albums	1

=== Year-end charts ===
Chart (2011)	Peak position
US Billboard 200	57
US Billboard Top Country Albums	12

Chart (2012)	Peak position
US Billboard 200	32
US Billboard Top Country Albums	8

=== Decade-end charts ===
Chart (2010–2019)	Position
US Billboard 200	191

=== Singles ===
Year	Single	Peak chart positions			Sales	Certifications
Year	Single	US Country	US	CAN	Sales	Certifications
2011	"I Love You This Big"	15	11	21	US: 915,000	US: Platinum
2011	"The Trouble with Girls"	17	55	—	US: 836,000	US: Platinum
2012	"Water Tower Town"	38	—	—	US: 49,000	

== Certifications ==
Region	Certification
United States (RIAA)	Platinum
