= You Time =

2020 single by Scotty McCreery

Single by Scotty McCreery

from the album Same Truck
- Released: September 23, 2020
- Genre: Country
- Length: 3:12
- Label: Triple Tigers
- Songwriters: Scotty McCreery; Frank Rogers; Aaron Eshuis
- Producers: Aaron Eshuis; Frank Rogers; Derek Wells

Scotty McCreery singles chronology
"In Between" (2019)	"You Time" (2020)	"Damn Strait" (2021)

Music video
- "You Time" on YouTube

"You Time" is a song by American country music singer Scotty McCreery. It was released on September 23, 2020, as the lead single from his fifth studio album Same Truck and released to country radio on October 12, 2020. The song was written by McCreery, Frank Rogers and Aaron Eshuis, who also produced together with Derek Wells.

== Background ==
McCreery told CMT the inspiration was from his wife, Gabi, because their work lives were too busy, so he preferred to have her all to himself.

He shared: "When I wrote this song, I was on the road more than I'd ever been. I'd get home just in time to see Gabi heading off to work so I was really craving 'You Time' with her."

== Release history ==
The song was released as a single digitally on September 23, 2020. It would later be released to country radio on October 12, 2020.

== Music video ==
The music video was released on February 28, 2021, directed by Brianna Fish. It followed a newlywed couple from "Just Married" moment to and every love-filled moment, and inserted clips of McCreery and his band performing the song.

== Charts ==
=== Weekly charts ===
Weekly chart performance for "You Time"
Chart (2020–2021)	Peak position
Australia Country Hot 50 (TMN)	45
Canada Country (Billboard)	23
US Billboard Hot 100	50
US Country Airplay (Billboard)	1
US Hot Country Songs (Billboard)	7

=== Year-end charts ===
Year-end chart performance for "You Time"
Chart (2021)	Position
US Country Airplay (Billboard)	26
US Hot Country Songs (Billboard)	50

== Certifications ==
Region	Certification	Certified units/sales
Canada (Music Canada)	Gold	40,000^{‡}
United States (RIAA)	Gold	500,000^{‡}
^{‡} Sales+streaming figures based on certification alone.
