= Five More Minutes (Scotty McCreery song) =

Single by Scotty McCreery

from the album Seasons Change
- Released: May 5, 2017
- Genre: Country
- Length: 4:00 (album version); 4:22 (video version)
- Label: Triple Tigers
- Songwriters: Scotty McCreery; Frank Rogers; Monty Criswell
- Producer: Frank Rogers

Scotty McCreery singles chronology
"Southern Belle" (2015)	"Five More Minutes" (2017)	"This Is It" (2018)

"Five More Minutes" is a song co-written and recorded by American country music singer Scotty McCreery. It was released in May 2017 as the first single from his fourth studio album, Seasons Change (2018). McCreery wrote the song with Monty Criswell and Frank Rogers, who also produced it. The song was inspired by the death of McCreery's grandfather and the desire to spend more time with a loved one.

"Five More Minutes" reached number one on the Billboard Country Airplay chart, giving McCreery his first number-one hit overall. It also charted at numbers 4 and 44 on both the Hot Country Songs and Hot 100 charts respectively. It was certified four-times Platinum by the Recording Industry Association of America (RIAA), and has sold 374,000 copies as of 2026. The song achieved similar chart success in Canada, peaking at number 2 on the Canada Country chart and number 100 on the Canadian Hot 100 chart.

The accompanying music video for the song, directed by Jeff Ray, consists of home movies from McCreery's childhood. "Five More Minutes" received positive reviews and was ranked as one of the top three country songs of 2018 by Billboard.

== Content ==
McCreery wrote the song with Monty Criswell and Frank Rogers after the death of his grandfather in 2015. He told The Boot that Criswell provided the central idea of wanting to spend "five more minutes" with a loved one.

== Critical reception ==
The song received positive reviews. Cillea Houghton of Taste of Country reviewed the single favorably, stating that "the young singer adds a bit of poignancy to country radio that's dominated by tailgates and beer drinking. McCreery's relatable lyrics, coupled with a radio-perfect melody, make "Five More Minutes" a song that fans are sure to gravitate to."

Billboard ranked "Five More Minutes" as the third-best country song of 2018, calling it "a declaration of independence from an artist who matured from a blue-chip prospect to a power player."

== Commercial performance ==
Initially, "Five More Minutes" was an independent release. It became the first song to chart on Mediabase's Top 50 country chart without support from a record label. Due to its initial success, McCreery signed with Triple Tigers in August 2017.

After 40 weeks on the chart, it became McCreery's first number one hit on the Billboard Country Airplay chart for the week of March 3, 2018. The song has sold 382,000 copies as of January 2019. The song was certified four-times platinum by the RIAA on November 19, 2026.

== Music video ==
The song's music video was directed by Jeff Ray. It features home movies from McCreery's childhood.

== Charts ==
=== Weekly charts ===
Chart (2017–2018)	Peak position
Canada Hot 100 (Billboard)	100
Canada Country (Billboard)	2
US Billboard Hot 100	44
US Country Airplay (Billboard)	1
US Hot Country Songs (Billboard)	4

=== Year-end charts ===
Chart (2017)	Position
US Hot Country Songs (Billboard)	71

Chart (2018)	Position
US Country Airplay (Billboard)	37
US Hot Country Songs (Billboard)	22

== Certifications ==
Region	Certification	Certified units/sales
Canada (Music Canada)	2× Platinum	160,000^{‡}
New Zealand (RMNZ)	Gold	15,000^{‡}
United States (RIAA)	4× Platinum	4,000,000^{‡}
^{‡} Sales+streaming figures based on certification alone.
