= In Between (Scotty McCreery song) =

Single by Scotty McCreery

from the album Seasons Change
- Released: April 1, 2019
- Genre: Country
- Length: 3:40
- Label: Triple Tigers
- Songwriters: Scotty McCreery; Frank Rogers; Jessi Alexander; Jonathan Singleton
- Producer: Frank Rogers

Scotty McCreery singles chronology
"This Is It" (2018)	"In Between" (2019)	"You Time" (2020)

"In Between" is a song co-written and recorded by American country music singer Scotty McCreery. It is the third single from his third studio album Seasons Change. McCreery wrote the song with Frank Rogers, Jessi Alexander, and Jonathan Singleton; Rogers produced it.

== Content and history ==
McCreery wrote the song in 2015 when having a conversation with Jessi Alexander, Jonathan Singleton, and Frank Rogers about the progress of his life to that point. He said that the song is "about life and balance and knowing who you are." Jeff Ray directed the song's music video, which features a split-screen effect portraying everyday scenes of McCreery's life with his wife and dog, as well as footage of him performing in concert. Billy Dukes of Taste of Country thought that the song's central theme, lyrics, and production showed continual artistic growth since McCreery's first albums.

== Chart performance ==
"In Between" ascended from No. 8 to No. 1 on the Billboard Country Airplay chart dated June 27, 2020, becoming the second-greatest ascent to the top in that chart's 30-year history, behind Ricky Van Shelton's "Keep It Between the Lines", which jumped 9-1 in 1991.

== Charts ==
=== Weekly charts ===
Chart (2019–2020)	Peak position
Canada Country (Billboard)	12
US Billboard Hot 100	53
US Country Airplay (Billboard)	1
US Hot Country Songs (Billboard)	12

=== Year-end charts ===
Chart (2020)	Position
US Country Airplay (Billboard)	33
US Hot Country Songs (Billboard)	46

== Certifications ==
Region	Certification	Certified units/sales
Canada (Music Canada)	Gold	40,000^{‡}
United States (RIAA)	Gold	500,000^{‡}
^{‡} Sales+streaming figures based on certification alone.
