= The Trouble with Girls (song) =

Single by Scotty McCreery

from the album Clear as Day
- Released: August 30, 2011
- Recorded: June 2011
- Genre: Country
- Length: 3:49
- Label: 19; Mercury Nashville
- Songwriters: Chris Tompkins; Philip White
- Producer: Mark Bright

Scotty McCreery singles chronology
"I Love You This Big" (2011)	"The Trouble with Girls" (2011)	"Water Tower Town" (2012)

"The Trouble with Girls" is a song written by Chris Tompkins and Philip White, and recorded by American country music artist and American Idol 's season 10 winner, Scotty McCreery. It was released in August 2011 as the second single from his debut album Clear as Day.

== Critical reception ==
Billy Dukes of Taste of Country gave the song mixed reviews, saying that the "heavy-handed production almost sabotages a fine performance." He later said "vulnerable and memorable." He gave the song three stars out of five. Matt Bjorke of Roughstock gave it favorable reviews noting "you’ll be hearing this song quite a bit on your local country radio stations as it’s everything that “I Love You This Big” isn't and proves that America got it right by voting Scotty as the next American Idol last spring." He gave the song four stars out of five.

== Commercial performance ==
As of February 18, 2014, the song has sold 836,000 copies in the United States. It was certified Platinum by the RIAA on November 11, 2014.

== Music video ==
Directed by Roman White, the video depicts a school day in the life of McCreery, with him performing the song on the baseball field, and in the school hallway. His future wife, Gabi Dugal, is featured as the lead girl in the video. It was filmed at McCreery's alma mater, Garner Magnet High School, in his hometown of Garner, North Carolina.

== Charts ==
Chart (2011–2012)	Peak position
US Billboard Hot 100	55
US Hot Country Songs (Billboard)	17

=== Year-end charts ===
Chart (2012)	Position
US Country Songs (Billboard)	71

== Certifications ==
Region	Certification	Certified units/sales
United States (RIAA)	Platinum	836,000

== Release history ==
Country	Date	Format	Label
United States	August 30, 2011	Radio airplay	19 Recordings, Inc
