= I Love You This Big =

Single by Scotty McCreery

from the album Clear as Day
- Released: May 25, 2011
- Recorded: 2011
- Genre: Country
- Length: 4:06
- Label: Mercury Nashville; 19
- Songwriters: Jay Smith; Ronnie Jackson; Esther Dean; Brett James
- Producer: Mark Bright

Scotty McCreery singles chronology
"I Love You This Big" (2011)	"The Trouble with Girls" (2011)

Music video
- "I Love You This Big" on YouTube

"I Love You This Big" is the debut song by American country music singer and American Idol season 10 winner Scotty McCreery. It was written by Brett James, Ester Dean, Jay "Saint" Smith and Lil' Ronnie, and was released in May 2011 as the first single from McCreery's debut studio album, Clear as Day. The song was first performed on the American Idol season 10 finale on May 24, 2011. The single was released to digital retailers after the final result show held on May 25, 2011. This song features backing vocals from Destinee & Paris.

== Music video ==
A video for the song has been released. McCreery explained the video as "This is going to be kind of a nice little chill, summertime barbecue, kind of like a community thing on the Fourth of July." The music video was released on August 9, 2011. The video starts with McCreery and his band getting set up in daylight for a Fourth of July party to take place that night. Later, people begin showing up in groups to the party and setting up to watch the concert. That night McCreery is singing with his band for the concert. Meanwhile, the focus goes to four couples, a blonde, curly-haired girl looking for a guy and then finding him and hug, a blonde girl and a guy holding hands, talking and kissing, a black haired girl running into her guy friend and hugging and a blonde girl and a guy getting food, holding hands and talking. Fireworks go off in the air as McCreery goes into the key change, and the couples switch to watching the fireworks and the concert. McCreery's mother is featured in the video. It was filmed in Los Angeles at Andrews Point.

== Composition ==
The song begins in the key of D major with the final chorus in E major. The video was directed by Shane Drake.

== Commercial performance ==
"I Love You This Big" debuted at number 32 on the US Billboard Hot Country Songs chart, following McCreery's win on American Idol. This is the highest debut of any new Country artist since Neilsen's inception on January 20, 1990. The song sold 171,404 units in its first week. On the Billboard Hot 100, the song debuted and peaked at number 11.

The song was certified Platinum by the Recording Industry Association of America on November 11, 2014. As of February, 2014, the song has sold 915,000 copies.

== Charts and certifications ==
=== Weekly charts ===
Chart (2011)	Peak position
Canada Hot 100 (Billboard)	21
US Billboard Hot 100	11
US Hot Country Songs (Billboard)	15

=== Year-end charts ===
Chart (2011)	Position
US Country Songs (Billboard)	63

=== Certifications ===
Region	Certification	Certified units/sales
United States (RIAA)	Platinum	915,000

== Release history ==
Country	Date	Format	Label
United States	May 25, 2011	Digital download	19 Recordings, Inc
