= Scotty McCreery =

American country singer (born 1993)

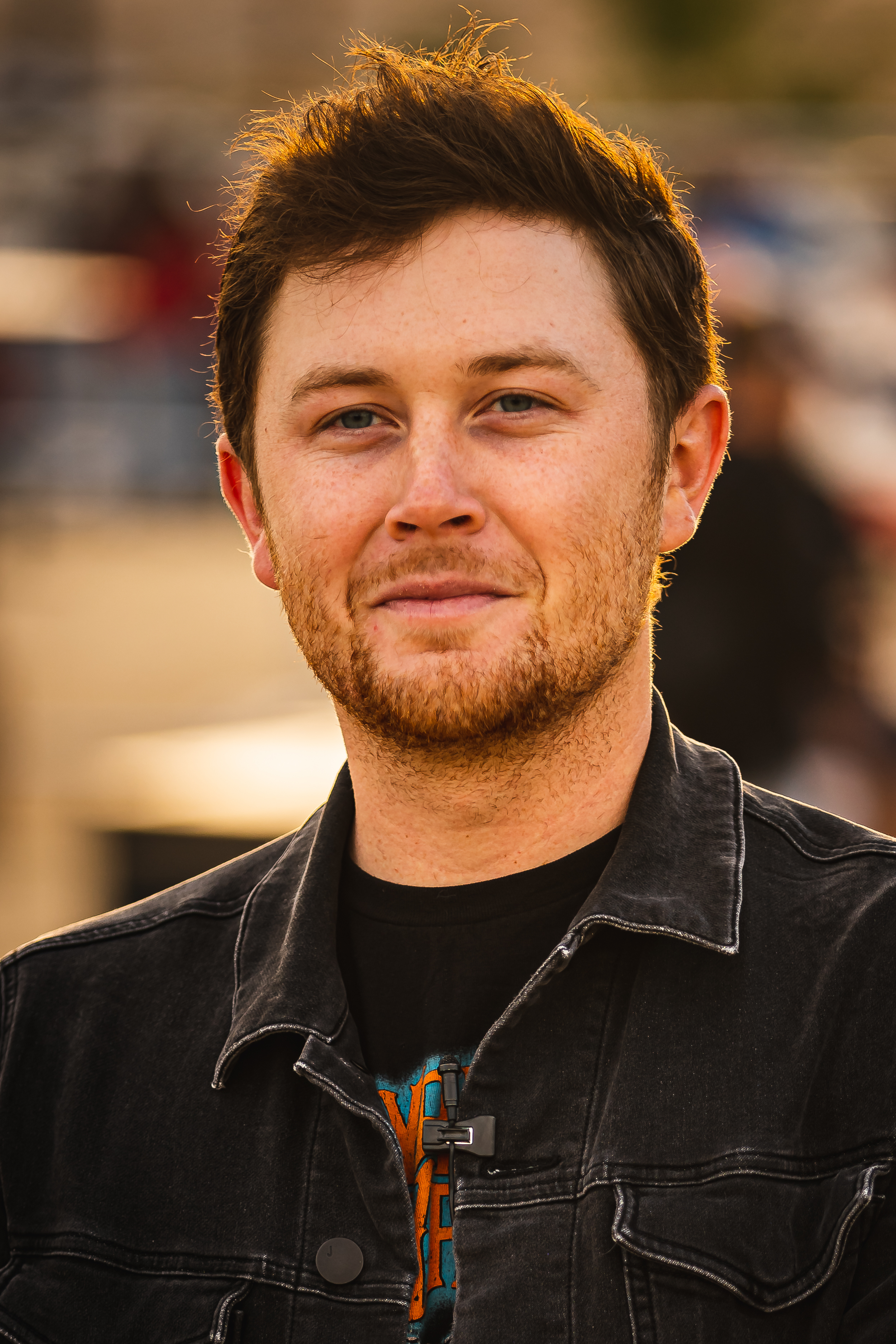
- McCreery in 2019

Background information
- Born: Scott Cooke McCreery; October 9, 1993 (age 33); Garner, North Carolina, U.S.
- Genre: Country
- Occupation: Singer
- Years active: 2011–present
- Labels: Interscope; Mercury Nashville; 19; Triple Tigers
- Spouse: Gabi Dugal (m. 2018)
- Website: scottymccreery.com

Scott Cooke McCreery (born October 9, 1993) is an American country singer. He rose to fame after winning the tenth season of American Idol in May 2011.

His debut studio album, Clear as Day, was released in October 2011 and was certified platinum in the United States. The album includes the top 20 country songs, "I Love You This Big" and "The Trouble with Girls". McCreery released a Christmas album, Christmas with Scotty McCreery, in October 2012 and it has been certified gold. He released his third album, See You Tonight, in October 2013. Its title track became his first single to reach the top ten on Billboard's Country charts. Setting a new record in July 2017 with his single "Five More Minutes", McCreery became the only country music artist in Country Aircheck/Media base history to chart a song without the backing of a record label; it topped Billboard in February 2018. His fourth album, Seasons Change, was released in March 2018 and became McCreery's fourth top 10 album in the United States. His fifth album, Same Truck, was released on September 17, 2021.

McCreery was inducted into the Grand Ole Opry on April 20, 2024, by Josh Turner.

== Early life ==
McCreery was born on October 9, 1993, in Garner, North Carolina, the son of Judy (née Cooke) and Michael McCreery. His parents originally planned on naming him Evan, but changed their minds on their way to the hospital. McCreery is of one quarter Puerto Rican descent; his father, a manufacturing systems analyst for Schneider Electric, was born in Aguadilla, Puerto Rico, to a military father and a Puerto Rican mother from San Juan, both of whom later moved to Aberdeen, North Carolina. McCreery's mother is a real estate agent for Fonville Morisey. She also owns a tanning salon in Clayton, North Carolina. McCreery's older sister, Ashley, attended UNC Charlotte. Both were raised in Garner.

Around the age of five or six, McCreery received a book about Elvis Presley from his grandmother, and Elvis became McCreery's earliest musical influence. He began learning guitar when he was around nine or ten years old.

McCreery attended Timber Drive Elementary School in Garner, West Lake Middle School in Apex, and Garner Magnet High School. He participated in all three schools' choruses, and he also sang at his middle school graduation. He sang tenor as a freshman in high school, where he was named Rookie of the Year. In his second year, he switched to singing bass and began singing in his church. He also starred in a school production of Bye Bye Birdie that year, playing the role of Conrad Birdie. McCreery went on to join a vocal ensemble called Die Meistersingers that was formed by his high school chorus teacher, Meredith Clayton, and with which he performed across the United States.

In 2009, McCreery won a singing contest called "Clayton Idol", which was held by WQDR-FM at the Clayton Harvest Festival in Clayton, North Carolina. After winning, he held several local shows with the radio station, raising money for sick children. Later the same year, he was one of thirty-six finalists in a contest called Rip the Hallways, which featured teenage vocalists from across North Carolina. On the eve of Valentine's Day, 2010, McCreery performed in a variety show called Gift 4, which was held by the town of Garner. In April of that year, he performed at the second annual Boots, Bands, and Bulls benefit concert. Funds from the concert went to Brittany's Battle, a Garner-based nonprofit that supports those affected by cancer. The concert was held in Raleigh, and country singer Jason Michael Carroll also performed.

Growing up, McCreery attended First Baptist Church in Garner. He led the church's youth praise band, Audience of One. In addition to his musical pursuits, McCreery was a member of his high school baseball team. His coach, Derik Goffena said of him, "He doesn't throw terribly hard. His best pitch is a curveball as far as getting people out. If he had to start he probably wouldn't walk more than one or two in a game." McCreery was working as a bagger at Lowes Foods when he auditioned for American Idol.

== American Idol ==
=== Overview ===
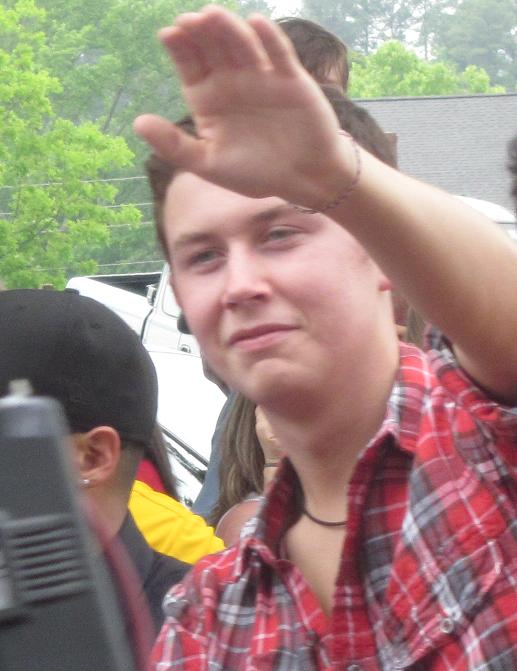
McCreery in 2011

McCreery auditioned for the tenth season of American Idol in Milwaukee, at the age of sixteen. He originally planned on auditioning in Nashville, but decided not to when he discovered that the date conflicted with an annual church camp. He sang "Your Man" by Josh Turner and "Put Some Drive in Your Country" by Travis Tritt for his audition, and then reprised "Your Man" for his first Hollywood Week performance. For the subsequent Group Round, he joined with Jacee Badeaux, Frances Coontz, Clint Jun Gamboa, and Monique de los Santos. Calling themselves "The Guaps", they chose to perform "Get Ready" by The Temptations. However, during a late stage of their preparation, Gamboa decided that Badeaux was not contributing enough to the group and forced him to leave. Before the performance, McCreery apologized to the judges for letting this happen. All five singers advanced to the next round.

For his second Hollywood Week solo performance, McCreery sang "I Hope You Dance" by Lee Ann Womack. He was not familiar with the lyrics and forgot them onstage. Afterward, he said that he did not feel that he deserved to go forward in the competition. The judges decided to give him another chance though, and following a well-received performance of Josh Turner's "Long Black Train", selected him as one of the twenty-four contestants that would move forward to the voting rounds of the competition.

McCreery did not venture far out of the country genre throughout the competition, although one of his most acclaimed performances was of Carole King's "You've Got a Friend". Taking note of season eight winner Kris Allen's success with a stripped-down version of the rap song "Heartless", McCreery considered doing an acoustic version of a hip-hop or R&B song, such as "So Sick" by Ne-Yo or something by Charlie Wilson. Instead, he went with Montgomery Gentry's "Gone", a country song with rap-like cadences. It was regarded by some as his best moment of the finals.

On making the Top 3, McCreery and the other remaining finalists earned celebratory hometown visits. While back in Garner, McCreery made an appearance at his high school's prom, threw the first pitch at a baseball game between the North Carolina State Wolfpack and the Florida State Seminoles, and performed for a crowd of around thirty-thousand at Lake Benson Park. He was joined by his guitar teacher, Gary Epperson and Epperson's band, Gavinhart. As McCreery was singing Josh Turner's "Your Man", Turner himself surprised McCreery onstage and joined him for the song.

McCreery entered the finale with fellow country singer Lauren Alaina, with whom he had shared duets several times that season. This was the youngest match-up in the history of the series. Alaina was sixteen at the time, and McCreery had turned seventeen since auditioning. He went on to become the series' youngest male winner and second youngest winner overall, after season six's Jordin Sparks, who was also seventeen when she won. Because of his age, McCreery had to have one of his parents live with him throughout the competition; usually his mother. They lived in a mansion with the other contestants for a short time, but moved into an apartment of their own before the end of the series.

American Idol season 10 performances and results
Episode	Theme	Song choice	Original artist	Order No.	Result
Audition	Auditioner's Choice	"Your Man"	Josh Turner	N/A	Advanced
Audition	Auditioner's Choice	"Put Some Drive in Your Country"	Travis Tritt	N/A	Advanced
Hollywood Round, Part 1	First Solo	"Your Man"	Josh Turner	N/A	Advanced
Hollywood Round, Part 2	Group Performance	"Get Ready" (with Monique De Los Santos, Frances Coontz and Clint Jun Gamboa)	The Temptations	N/A	Advanced
Hollywood Round, Part 3	Second Solo	"I Hope You Dance"	Lee Ann Womack	N/A	Advanced
Las Vegas Round	Songs of The Beatles; Group Performance	"Hello, Goodbye"	The Beatles	N/A	Advanced
Hollywood Round Final	Final Solo	"Long Black Train"	Josh Turner	N/A	Advanced
Top 24 (12 Men)	Personal Choice	"Letters from Home"	John Michael Montgomery	8	Advanced
Top 13	Your Personal Idol	"The River"	Garth Brooks	12	Safe
Top 12	Year You Were Born	"Can I Trust You with My Heart"	Travis Tritt	8	Safe
Top 11	Motown	"For Once in My Life"	Stevie Wonder	7	Safe
Top 11^{1}	Elton John	"Country Comfort"	Elton John	1	Safe
Top 9	Rock & Roll Hall of Fame	"That's All Right"	Arthur Crudup	6	Safe
Top 8	Songs from the Movies	"I Cross My Heart" — Pure Country	George Strait	4	Safe
Top 7	Songs from the 21st Century	"Swingin'"	John Anderson	1	Safe
Top 6	Carole King	Solo "You've Got a Friend"	Carole King	4	Safe
Top 6	Carole King	Duet "Up on the Roof" with Lauren Alaina	The Drifters	6	Safe
Top 5	Songs from Now and Then	"Gone"	Montgomery Gentry	4	Safe
Top 5	Songs from Now and Then	"Always on My Mind"	American standard	9	Safe
Top 4	Songs That Inspire	"Where Were You (When the World Stopped Turning)"	Alan Jackson	3	Safe
Top 4	Leiber & Stoller Songbook	"Young Blood"	The Coasters	6	Safe
Top 3	Contestant's Choice	"Amazed"	Lonestar	1	Safe
Top 3	Jimmy Iovine's Choice	"Are You Gonna Kiss Me or Not"	Thompson Square	4	Safe
Top 3	Judges' Choice	"She Believes in Me"	Kenny Rogers	7	Safe
Finale	Favorite Performance	"Gone"	Montgomery Gentry	1	Winner
Finale	George Strait's Choice	"Check Yes or No"	George Strait	3	Winner
Finale	Coronation Song	"I Love You This Big"	Scotty McCreery	5	Winner

- ^Note 1 Due to the judges using their one save on Casey Abrams, the Top 11 remained intact for another week, when two contestants were eliminated.

== Career ==
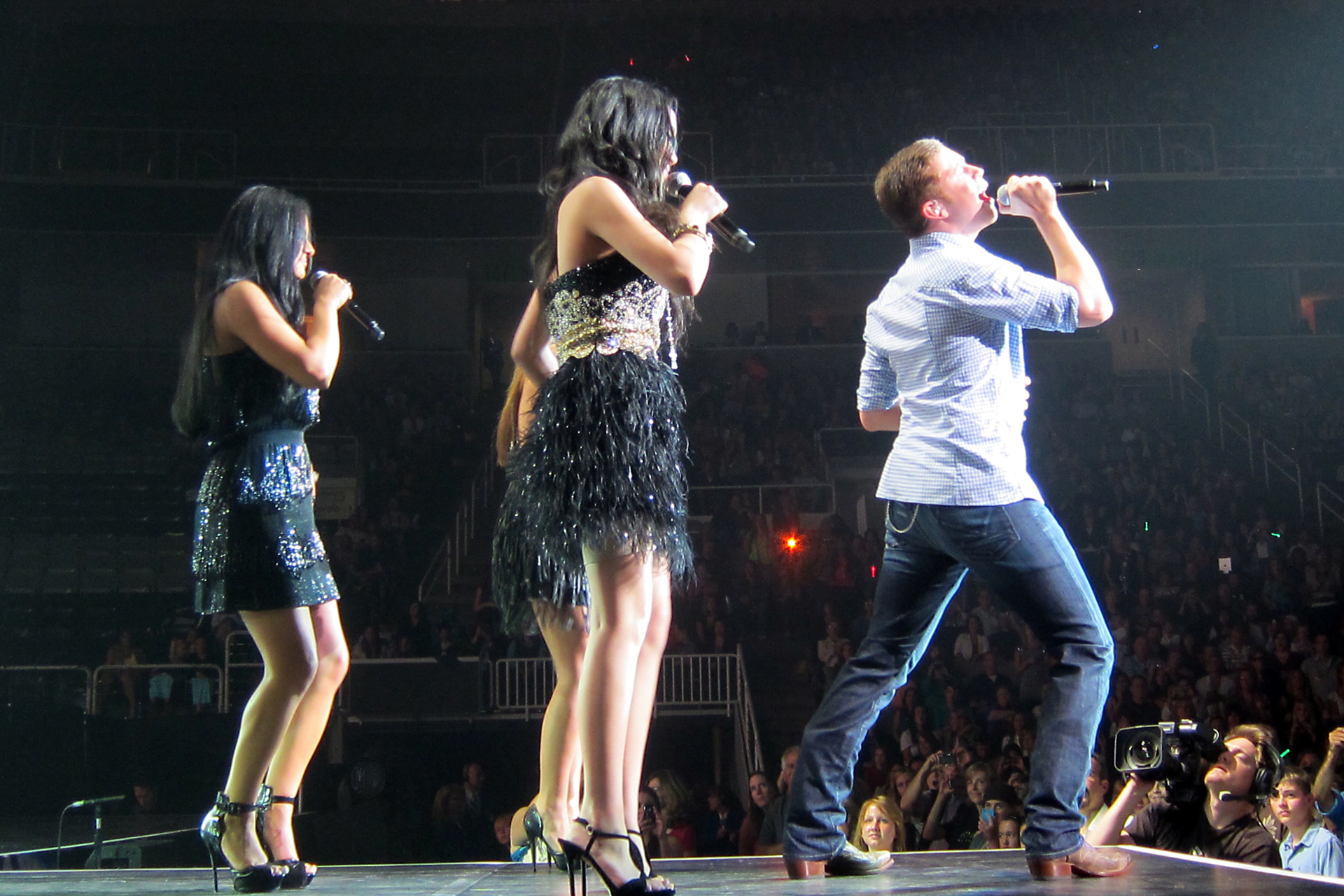
Season 10 American Idol tour, Scotty McCreery performing with Thia Megia, Haley Reinhart and Pia Toscano

McCreery released his coronation single "I Love You This Big" immediately after winning the tenth season of American Idol. The song entered the Billboard Hot Country Songs chart at number 32, becoming the highest debut for a debut single since the chart converted to BDS data the week of January 20, 1990. The song sold 171,404 units in its first week, and was certified gold on August 25, 2011. A music video for the song, shot on Angels Point near Dodger Stadium, was released on August 9, 2011.

He signed with Mercury Nashville, earning a contract that gave him over $250,000 in advances for recording the first album.

Both McCreery and Lauren Alaina were invited to present at the CMT Music Awards on June 8, 2011, and they also both performed on the Grand Ole Opry on June 10. McCreery performed "I Love You This Big" and George Strait's song "Check Yes or No." Their trip to Nashville was also featured later in an ABC Special CMA Music Fest: Country's Night to Rock where McCreery performed "Your Man" with Josh Turner at the CMA Music Festival.

McCreery toured with the American Idols LIVE! Tour 2011, which began in West Valley City, Utah, on July 6, 2011, and ended in Manila, Philippines on September 21, 2011.

McCreery recorded Tim McGraw's "Please Remember Me" and it was released on March 8, 2012. It was used as the exit song on the eleventh season of American Idol.

=== 2011: Clear as Day ===
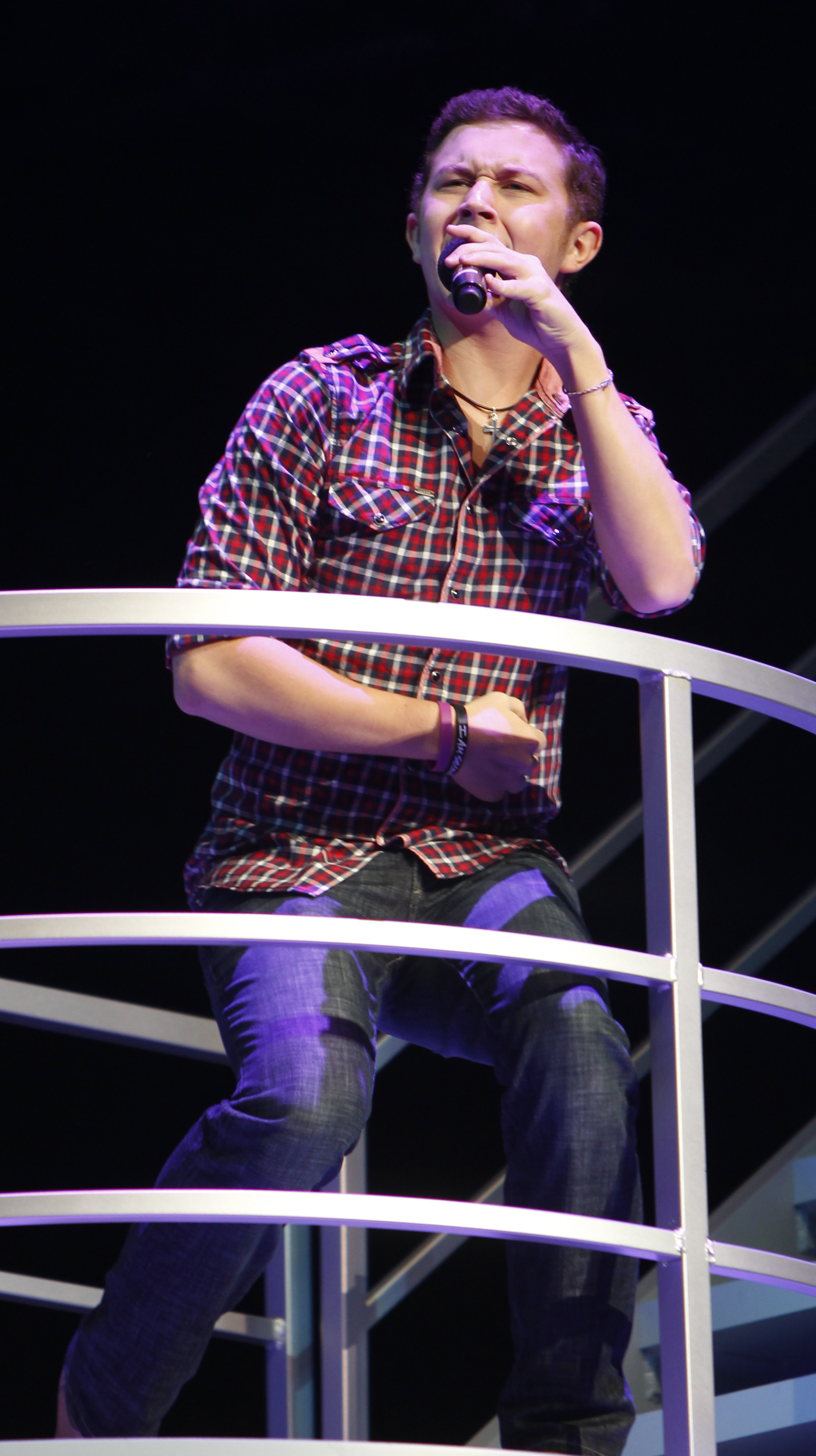
McCreery performing in 2011.

McCreery's debut album, Clear as Day, was released on October 4, 2011. Tracks from the album include a song from Keith Urban, and the title track "Clear as Day". McCreery aimed to include an explicitly Christian song in that album and he included the song "Old King James," which dwells on a Bible being passed down for generations. On October 3, 2011, the day before his debut album was scheduled to be released, GAC premiered a TV special, Introducing: Scotty McCreery.

The album sold 197,000 on its debut week, and McCreery made history as the first country act to debut at number one on Billboard 200 with their first studio album, as well as the youngest man to open at the top of the chart with his debut release. It reached number one on five separate Billboard charts – Billboard 200, Top Current Albums, Digital Albums, Internet Albums, and Top Country Albums. With the debut album Clear as Day reaching number one on the Billboard 200, he joined Kelly Clarkson, Ruben Studdard, Clay Aiken, Carrie Underwood, Chris Daughtry and Adam Lambert as the only Idol contestants to have a number one album. Clear as Day has since been certified platinum with over 1 million units shipped.

Before the release of his album, a single from this album, "The Trouble with Girls", was premiered on radio on August 30, 2011, and released onto iTunes on September 1, 2011. The news that "The Trouble with Girls", along with the album Clear as Day, had been certified gold coincided with McCreery's appearance on Today on November 23, 2011. The next day, the Thanksgiving Day of 2011, McCreery performed "The Trouble With Girls" at the 85th Macy's Thanksgiving Day Parade in New York City then headlined the Macy's Great Tree Lighting at Lenox Square Mall in Atlanta in the evening.

On November 9, 2011, McCreery performed a track from his album, "Walk in the Country", and announced the CMA Radio Stations of the Year honors at the 45th Annual Country Music Association Awards. The next day McCreery joined other country stars in Nashville to tape the CMA Country Christmas special that aired on ABC on December 1. He performed "The First Noel", which was included in his Christmas album the following year, during the second annual CMA Country Christmas.

On October 19, 2011, McCreery sang the National Anthem in Game 1 of the World Series between the St. Louis Cardinals and Texas Rangers at Busch Stadium in St. Louis. He also performed on the Disney Parks Christmas Day Parade at Walt Disney World on December 25, 2011.

McCreery was nominated and won the first of his awards at the 2nd Annual American Country Awards on December 5, 2011. He performed his second single at the award show and won in the New Artist category. He also won the Best New Artist award at the ACM Awards on April 1, 2012. He received the Breakthrough Video of the Year Award at the CMT Music Awards on June 6, 2012.

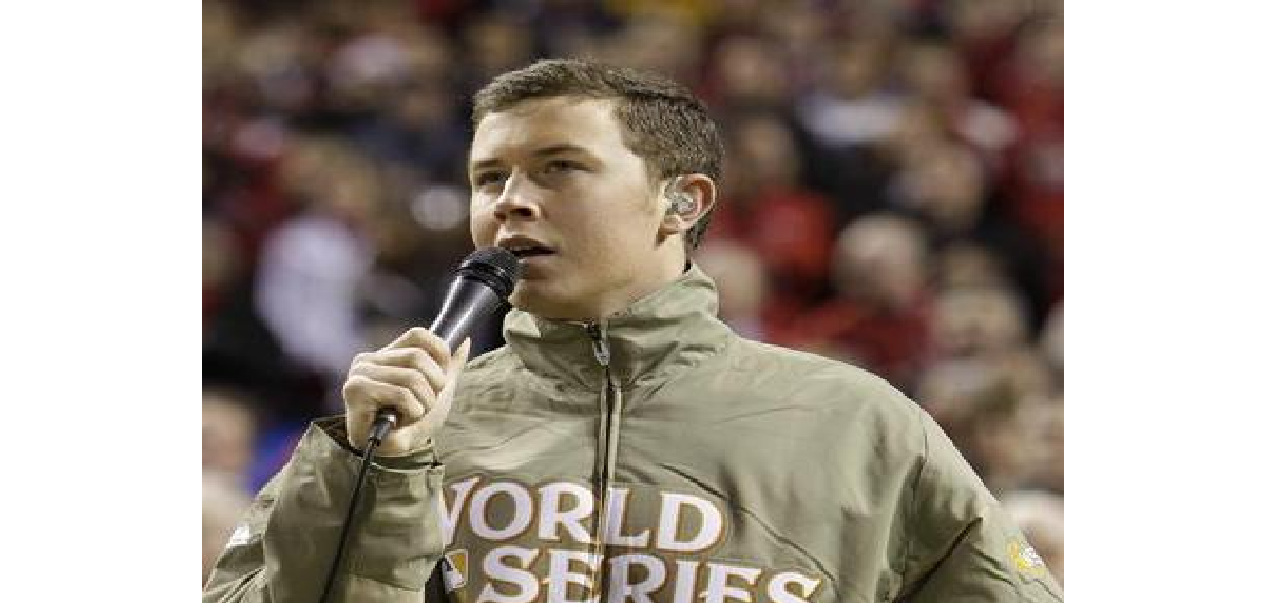
McCreery in 2012

=== 2012: Christmas with Scotty McCreery ===
In 2012, he opened for Brad Paisley along with The Band Perry. The tour kicked off on January 12 with tour dates announced for the first quarter of 2012.

Christmas with Scotty McCreery, was released on October 16, 2012. The album includes nine holiday classics and two new holiday songs. It debuted at number four on Billboard 200 with sales of 41,000, and was certified gold on November 26, 2012. The Christmas album was included in the Scotty McCreery QVC Bundle, which also contains Clear as Day, released through QVC, and sold 5,000 copies the first week. McCreery also hopes to make more Christmas albums in the future.

McCreery performed two tracks from the album, "Holly Jolly Christmas" and "Jingle Bells" in the Christmas in Rockefeller Center special broadcast on NBC on November 28, 2012. He also sang "Winter Wonderland" at the CMA Country Christmas show aired on ABC on December 20, 2012. He performed Santa Claus Is Back in Town and Mary, Did You Know? at the "Christmas in Washington" gala, an annual seasonal celebration benefiting the Children's National Medical Center attended by the President.

=== 2013–2015: See You Tonight ===
McCreery's second album, See You Tonight, was released on October 15, 2013. The album was produced by Frank Rogers. Its title track was released in May of that year as the lead single, and became McCreery's first song to reach the top ten on Billboard's Hot Country Songs chart. McCreery wrote the song with Ashley Gorley and Zach Crowell. "Feelin' It" was released as the second single in April 2014 and debuted at number fifty-four on the Country Airplay chart. The single reached the top ten on Billboard Country Airplay.

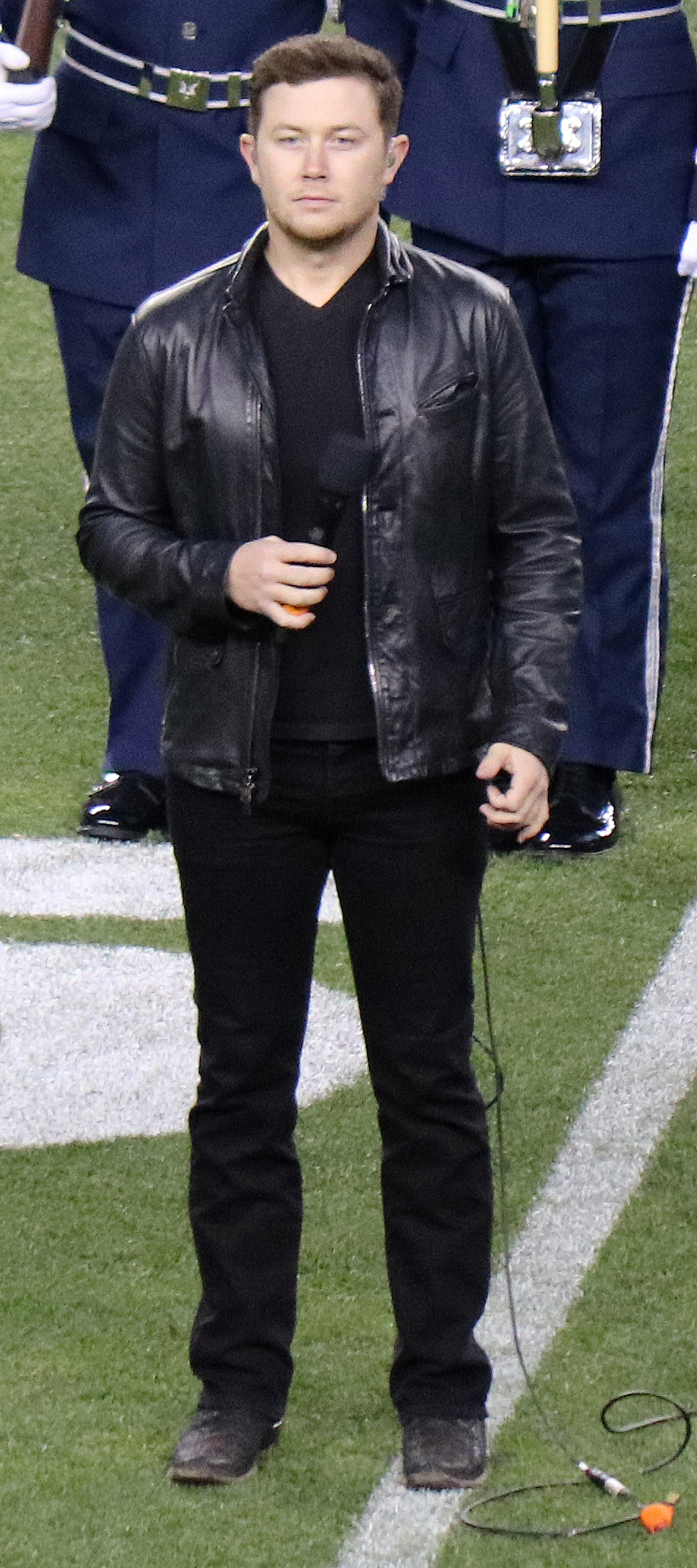
McCreery in 2017

=== 2015–2019: Departure from Mercury, Go Big or Go Home, and Seasons Change ===
In August 2015, McCreery released the single "Southern Belle", which was intended as the lead single for a third Mercury album. The single failed to gain much traction on the radio, peaking at number 45 on Billboard Country Airplay. On February 3, 2016, it was confirmed that McCreery had parted ways with Mercury. He mentored two semi-finalists during the fifteenth season of American Idol. McCreery sang with Jeneve Rose Mitchell on "Gone" and with Jenna Renae on his own "See You Tonight". On April 7, 2016, he returned to American Idol for the original series' final show, performing a country medley with Idol alumni Kellie Pickler, Lauren Alaina, Kree Harrison, Bucky Covington, Constantine Maroulis, Ace Young, Diana DeGarmo, and Skylar Laine.

He wrote a book, Go Big or Go Home, which was released May 3, 2016. He describes the book as a travelogue about specific memories throughout his life. He went on a book tour.

McCreery signed a new management deal with Triple 8 on October 24, 2016. McCreery released his new single, "Five More Minutes" to digital retailers and streaming services on May 5, 2017. The song was co-written by McCreery, Frank Rogers, and Monty Criswell, after the passing of his grandfather. On June 12, 2017, McCreery released a music video for the single which includes home videos of his life. "Five More Minutes" is the first song released without a record label to ever chart on the Country Aircheck/Mediabase Top 50. On August 15, 2017, McCreery signed a new label deal with Triple Tigers Records/Sony Music Entertainment. In January 2018, "Five More Minutes" became McCreery's first number one single on the country singles charts. On August 5, 2018, McCreery appeared on "Celebrity Family Feud" and won $25,000 for his charity, St. Jude Children's Research Hospital. McCreery released his second single, "This Is It", to digital retailers on March 9, 2018. The single peaked at number one on the Billboard Country Airplay and Mediabase Country charts. McCreery released his third single, "In Between", to radio on April 1, 2019, which later became his third consecutive number one on both the Billboard Country Airplay and Mediabase Country charts.

=== 2020–2022: Same Truck ===
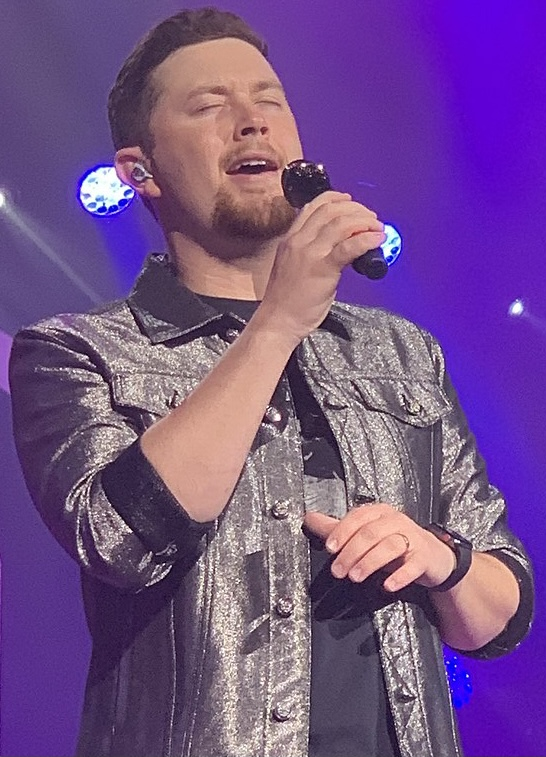
McCreery performing at the Ryman Auditorium in 2020

"You Time" was released on September 23, 2020 as the first single to his fifth studio album, Same Truck, which was released on September 17, 2021. "Damn Strait" was released on October 18, 2021, as the second single. A deluxe version was released that included the single, "It Matters to Her" that peaked at number three on the Country Airplay chart.

=== 2023–present: Rise & Fall ===
McCreery released the single "Cab in a Solo" on August 18, 2023 as the lead single to his sixth studio album, Rise & Fall. It reached number one in May 2024 ahead of the release of the album. Rise & Fall was received with positive reviews, drawing comparisons to 1990's country. The second lead single from the album, "Fall of Summer," was sent to country radio on May 28, 2024.

In 2025, McCreery released the single "Bottle Rockets" featuring Hootie & the Blowfish. The song reached number one on both the Billboard Country Airplay chart and the Canada Country chart.

== Personal life ==
McCreery is a Christian. He graduated from Garner Magnet High School in 2012, and attended North Carolina State University in Raleigh, North Carolina, pursuing a bachelor's degree in communications. Although he is one fourth Puerto Rican, he does not speak Spanish fluently, and regrets that he did not learn the language when he was younger. In September 2017, McCreery became engaged to his longtime girlfriend Gabi Dugal. They were married on June 16, 2018, in the mountains of Ashe County, North Carolina. In June 2022, McCreery and his wife Gabi announced that they were expecting their first child, a baby boy. Their son was born on October 24, 2022. Their second son was born on September 18, 2025.

=== Influences ===
McCreery said that during his childhood, he listened to Merle Haggard, George Jones, and Conway Twitty; and he cites Elvis Presley as his greatest musical influence.

=== Personal interests ===
McCreery is an avid sports fan and is a particular fan of the Carolina Hurricanes, as well as the Boston Red Sox and New England Patriots — his father having grown up in the Boston area. He is an avid fan of NC State Wolfpack sports, having been raised in the greater Raleigh area and attended NC State University.

McCreery sang the National Anthem before the Patriots AFC divisional game on January 16, 2016. On October 4, 2013, he began blogging for Major League Baseball, continuing to blog for the remainder of the 2013 Major League Baseball season.

== Discography ==
- Clear as Day (2011)
- Christmas with Scotty McCreery (2012)
- See You Tonight (2013)
- Seasons Change (2018)
- Same Truck (2021)
- Rise & Fall (2024)

== Filmography ==
Film & Television
Year	Film	Role	Notes
2011	American Idol	Himself	Season Ten winner
2012	Hart of Dixie	Himself	Season 1 - Episode 19: "Destiny & Denial"
2018	Celebrity Family Feud	Himself	Season 5 - Episode 7: "Scotty McCreery vs. Chris Kattan and Amber Riley vs. Tori Spelling & Dean McDermott"
2021	Five More Minutes	Executive Producer & Writer	Hallmark Television Film

== Tours ==
Headlining

- Weekend Roadtrip Tour (2013)
- See You Tonight Tour (2014)
- Seasons Change Tour (2018)
- You Time Tour (2021)
- Rise and Fall (2025)

Co-headlining

- American Idols LIVE! Tour 2011 (2011)

Supporting

- Virtual Reality World Tour (2012)
- Riot Tour (2015)
- Make It Sweet Tour (2019)
- Town Ain't Big Enough Tour (2020)

== Philanthropy ==
In 2011, McCreery participated in Operation Christmas Child, a program dedicated to donating toys to impoverished children around the world. Every year since then, he has participated in the City of Hope Celebrity Softball Game, which raises funds for cancer research. He performed a benefit concert in November 2012, through which he raised $5,000 for World Vision to help with the Hurricane Sandy relief efforts, and the following year, World Vision acted as the charitable sponsor for McCreery's Weekend Roadtrip Tour (2013). Over the course of a 2013 Major League Baseball ballpark tour, McCreery donated $50,000 to various youth baseball programs across the United States, including Major League Baseball's Reviving Baseball in Inner Cities (RBI) program. McCreery became a National Goodwill Ambassador for the 12.14 Foundation in February 2014. He has an active role in promoting the Foundation's arts program, supporting their fundraising efforts, and creating awareness for their vision and objectives to help the people of Newtown, Connecticut. On December 4, 2014, McCreery performed a benefit concert which raised $60,000 to the foundation. In December 2017, McCreery and other country artists recorded a charity single, a cover of Alabama's "Angels Among Us," to benefit St. Jude Children's Research Hospital. McCreery appeared on "Celebrity Family Feud" on August 5, 2018, and won $25,000 for St. Jude Children's Research Hospital.

== Honors and awards ==
In 2017 McCreery received the Order of the Long Leaf Pine, the highest civilian award given by the State of North Carolina. He received the award on stage at a performance at the Grand Ole Opry in Nashville, Tennessee. He was nominated for the award by outgoing governor Pat McCrory and conferred the award by his replacement Roy Cooper.

In 2024, McCreery was inducted as a member of the Grand Ole Opry, following an invitation by Garth Brooks in December 2023.

=== Music awards ===
Year	Association	Category	Recipient	Result	Ref
2011	Teen Choice Awards 2011	Choice Music: Breakout Artist	Scotty McCreery	Nominated	
2011	American Country Awards	Artist of the Year: New Artist	Scotty McCreery	Won	
2012	Academy of Country Music Awards	Best New Artist	Scotty McCreery	Won	
2012	Billboard Music Awards	Top New Artist	Scotty McCreery	Nominated	
2012	Billboard Music Awards	Top Country Album	Clear as Day	Nominated	
2012	CMT Music Awards	USA Breakthrough Video of the Year	"The Trouble with Girls"	Won	
2012	MusicRow Awards	Breakthrough Artist	Scotty McCreery	Nominated	
2012	Teen Choice Awards 2012	Choice Male Country Artist	Scotty McCreery	Nominated	
2012	Teen Choice Awards 2012	Choice TV: Male Reality Star (American Idol)	Scotty McCreery	Nominated	
2013	American Country Awards	Artist of the Year: Breakthrough Artist	Scotty McCreery	Won	
2015	BMI Country Awards	Top 50 Songs	"See You Tonight"	Won	
2018	BMI Country Awards	Top 50 Songs	"Five More Minutes"	Won	
2019	BMI Country Awards	Top 50 Songs	"This Is It"	Won	
2023	CMT Music Awards	CMT Digital-First Performance of the Year	"Damn Strait" (from CMT Campfire Sessions)	Nominated	

== See also ==
- List of Idols winners
