= Aaron Eshuis =

- Born: Aaron James Eshuis
- Origin: Kalamazoo, Michigan, United States
- Genre: Country
- Occupation: Songwriter

Aaron James Eshuis is an American songwriter and record producer, originally from Kalamazoo, Michigan, United States. Eshuis moved to Nashville, Tennessee, and later signed a worldwide publishing deal with SMACKSongs in 2017. Eshuis has worked on records with Rascal Flatts, Joe Nichols, A Thousand Horses, Kid Rock, Cole Swindell, and Scotty McCreery. Eshuis had his first No. 1 hit with Scotty McCreery's "This Is It" in late 2018. In addition to writing, Eshuis has produced on Ryan Hurd's debut EP and McCreery's album, Seasons Change, which debuted at No. 1 on Billboard’s Top Country Albums Chart.

== Songwriting discography ==
| Year | Artist | Album | Song | Co-writer(s) |
|---|---|---|---|---|
| 2009 | Nikita | The Beat of Summer 2012 | "Weightless" | T.J. Oosterhuis |
| 2009 | Curtis Grimes | Our Side of the Fence | "Keg Party" | Ryan Hurd, Joey Hyde |
| 2009 | Nashville Cast | The Music of Nashville: Season 3, Volume 1 | "If It's Love" | Justin Davis, Sarah Zimmermann |
| 2014 | The Swon Brothers | The Swon Brothers | "Chasing You Around" | Ryan Hurd |
| 2014 | Rascal Flatts | Rewind | "Payback" | Ryan Hurd, Neil Mason |
| 2015 | Jordyn Stoddard | Southern Tide | "Southern Tide" | Drew Baldridge, Hannah Ellis |
| 2015 | Josh Abbott Band | Front Row Seat | "Live It While You Got It" | Josh Abbott, Mike Daly |
| 2016 | Cole Swindell | You Should Be Here | "Home Game" | Brandon Lay, Heather Morgan |
| 2017 | Kid Rock | Sweet Southern Sugar | "American Rock 'n Roll" | Kid Rock, Neal Medley, Joey Hyde |
| 2017 | Joe Nichols | Never Gets Old | "Hostage" | Ryan Lafferty, Brett Tyler |
| 2017 | A Thousand Horses | Bridges | "Blaze of Somethin'" | Ryan Hurd, Michael Hobby, Bill Satcher |
| 2018 | Scotty McCreery | Seasons Change | | |
| 2018 | Scotty McCreery | Seasons Change | "This Is It" | Scotty McCreery, Frank Rogers |
| 2018 | Scotty McCreery | Seasons Change | "Still" | Scotty McCreery |
| 2018 | Scotty McCreery | Seasons Change | "Move It on Out" | Scotty McCreery, Dan Isbell |
| 2018 | Teddy Robb | Lead Me On | "Lead Me On" | Ryan Beaver, Matt McGinn, Teddy Robb |
| 2019 | Ryan Hurd | Single | Her Name Was Summer | Ryan Hurd, Mike Walker |
| 2019 | Ryan Hurd | To a T | Michigan For The Winter | Ryan Hurd, Neil Mason |
| 2019 | Dexter Roberts | Single | Looking Back | Ryan Hurd, Jessie Jo Dillon |
| 2020 | Scotty McCreery | Same Truck | "You Time" | Scotty McCreery, Frank Rogers |

== Producer ==
Eshuis has produced the following works:

| Year | Artist | Type | Project |
|---|---|---|---|
| 2017 | Ryan Hurd | EP | Ryan Hurd - EP |
| 2018 | Scotty McCreery | Album | Seasons Change |
| 2019 | Ryan Hurd | EP | Panorama |
| 2020 | Cady Groves | EP | Bless My Heart |
| 2021 | Scotty McCreery | Album | Same Truck |
