= Southern Belle (song) =

Single by Scotty McCreery
- Released: August 17, 2015
- Recorded: 2015
- Genre: Country
- Length: 3:20
- Label: Mercury Nashville
- Songwriter(s): Sean McConnell; Jason Saenz
- Producer(s): Frank Rogers

Scotty McCreery singles chronology
"Feelin' It" (2014)	"Southern Belle" (2015)	"Five More Minutes" (2017)

"Southern Belle" is a song recorded by American country music singer Scotty McCreery. It was released on August 17, 2015, to digital retailers and released to radio on August 31, 2015, by Mercury Nashville. The song only charted at 45 on the Billboard Country Airplay chart, resulting in Mercury Nashville dropping McCreery from the label.

== Content ==
The song was written by Sean McConnell and Jason Saenz. It moves McCreery away from traditional country and more towards pop. In an interview with Rolling Stone Country, McCreery said "This is probably about as far left as we'll go." "Southern Belle" contains more mature themes than McCreery's previous releases. McCreery acknowledges that it shows a different side of him than his public image.

== Critical reception ==
Taste of Country said that McCreery breaks expectations. McCreery's performance evolves throughout the song. Matt Bjorke of Roughstock says the song will appeal to a wide range of audiences and blends traditional and contemporary country well.

== Commercial performance ==
In its first week, it sold 7,000 copies and debuted at number 36 on the Country Digital Songs charts. It also debuted at number 58 on the U.S. Billboard Country Airplay chart for the week of October 3, 2015. It reached a peak of number 45, becoming his lowest-charting single and first to miss the top 40.

== Live performances ==
McCreery debuted the song on Fox & Friends on July 31, 2015.

== Music video ==
The music video was directed by Roman White and premiered in November 2015.

== Chart performance ==
Chart (2015–16)	Peak position
US Country Airplay (Billboard)	45
