= American Idols Live! Tour 2011 =

2011 summer concert tour

- Tour by American Idol
- Back: James Durbin, Scotty McCreery, Paul McDonald; Middle: Stefano Langone, Naima Adedapo, Haley Reinhart, Lauren Alaina; Front: Pia Toscano, Casey Abrams, Thia Megia, Jacob Lusk
- Start date: July 6, 2011
- End date: September 21, 2011
- No. of shows: 49
- Box office: 22 million from 47 shows

American Idol concert chronology
- American Idols Live! Tour 2010 (2010); American Idols Live! Tour 2011 (2011); American Idols Live! Tour 2012 (2012)

The American Idols Live! Tour 2011 was a summer and fall concert tour in the United States, Canada and the Philippines that features the Top 11 contestants of the tenth season of American Idol. The 49-date tour started in West Valley City, Utah, on July 6, and its North American leg ended in Rochester, New York on September 10. Forty-five dates were originally planned and four extra dates were added due to high demand, including two final shows in Manila, Philippines, the second time the show had traveled outside North America after Singapore was added to the tour schedule in Season 3.

The 2011 tour was promoted again by AEG Live after a year with Live Nation. The Ford Motor Company, Coca-Cola, and the US Air Force Reserve were also sponsors of the tour.

== Performers ==
Scotty McCreery (Winner)	Lauren Alaina (runner-up)
Haley Reinhart (3rd place)	James Durbin (4th place)
Jacob Lusk (5th place)	Casey Abrams (6th place)
Stefano Langone (7th place)	Paul McDonald (8th place)
Pia Toscano (9th place)	Naima Adedapo (10th or 11th place)
Thia Megia (10th or 11th place)

== Setlist ==
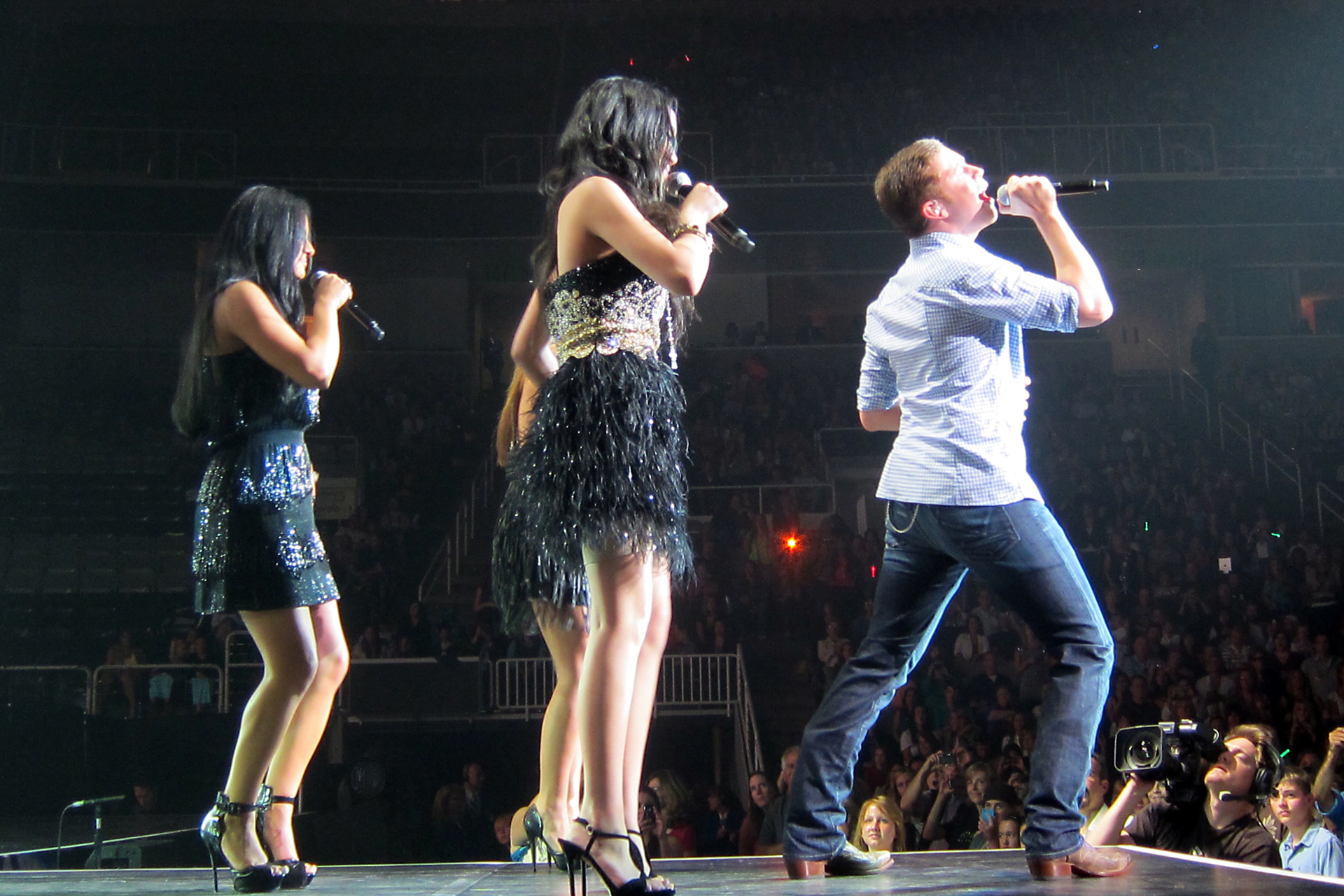
Season 10 American Idol tour, Scotty McCreery performing with Thia Megia, Haley Reinhart and Pia Toscano

- Naima Adedapo, Thia Megia, Haley Reinhart, Lauren Alaina and Pia Toscano – "Born This Way" (Lady Gaga)
- Toscano – "Empire State of Mind" (Jay-Z and Alicia Keys)
- Toscano and Stefano Langone – "California King Bed" (Rihanna)
- Paul McDonald – "Maggie May" (Rod Stewart)
- Megia – "Who Says" (Selena Gomez & the Scene)
- Megia, Reinhart, Adedapo and Toscano – "Tightrope" (Janelle Monáe)
- Langone – "Grenade" (Bruno Mars)
- Langone (Adedapo, Megia, Reinhart and Toscano on backing vocals) – "DJ Got Us Fallin' in Love" (Usher)
- McDonald, James Durbin, Casey Abrams, Langone and Jacob Lusk – "Animal" (Neon Trees)
- Adedapo – "On the Floor" (Jennifer Lopez)
- Toscano – "This Time" (Pia Toscano)
- Alaina, Toscano and Megia – "Firework" (Katy Perry)
- Abrams – "Smooth" (Rob Thomas and Santana)
- Abrams and Reinhart – "Moanin'"
- Abrams – "Harder to Breathe" (Maroon 5)
- All (Except Scotty McCreery) – "Forget You!" (Cee Lo Green)

Intermission

- Alaina – "Flat on the Floor" (Katrina Elam) and "Like My Mother Does" (Kristy Lee Cook)
- Alaina (Langone, Megia and Reinhart on backing vocals) – "If I Die Young" (The Band Perry)
- Durbin – "Sweet Child o' Mine" (Guns N' Roses) and "Uprising" (Muse)
- Lusk – "Never Too Much" (Luther Vandross)
- Lusk (Adedapo, Langone and Toscano backing vocals) – "You're All I Need to Get By" (Marvin Gaye and Tammi Terrell)
- Reinhart – "The House of the Rising Sun" (Traditional) and "Bennie and the Jets" (Elton John)
- McCreery – "Your Man" (Josh Turner), "Are You Gonna Kiss Me Or Not" (Thompson Square) and "I Love You This Big" (Scotty McCreery)
- McCreery and Alaina – "When You Say Nothing at All" (Keith Whitley)
- McCreery (Alaina, Megia, Reinhart and Toscano on backing vocals) – "Gone" (Montgomery Gentry)
- Group medley – Durbin and Alaina – "Here I Go Again" (Whitesnake), Abrams, McDonald and Reinhart – "Faithfully" (Journey), Adedapo, Langone, Lusk and Megia – "Walk This Way" (Aerosmith), all – "Any Way You Want It/Lovin', Touchin', Squeezin'" (Journey)

== Additional notes ==
- Lauren Alaina sprained her ankle backstage at the Portland show, and performed her next show with the injured foot strapped in a boot.
- The performance of Firework was removed from the setlist in shows starting from Rosemont, Illinois due to Lauren Alaina needing to rest her voice. It did return to the set starting with the Philadelphia show. Alaina did not appear in the first half in Columbus and Pittsburgh, and did appear in the second. She missed the Baltimore show completely, and reported that she was suffering from severe bronchitis.
- The show at Albany on August 28, 2011, was postponed to September 4, 2011, due to Hurricane Irene that struck the East Coast of the United States on August 27.
- It was the second time that the American Idol Live! Tour traveled to Asia with the Philippines being the second and only country that year that they traveled to outside the United States and Canada.

== Tour dates ==
Date	City	Country	Venue	Attendance			Gross
Date	City	Country	Venue	Sales	Capacity	Percentage	Gross
North America
July 6, 2011	West Valley City	United States	Maverik Center	6,251	6,616	95%	$351,295
July 8, 2011	Everett	United States	Comcast Arena	7,887	7,887	100%	$435,295
July 9, 2011	Portland	United States	Rose Garden Arena	8,695	9,044	96%	$467,635
July 11, 2011	Sacramento	United States	Power Balance Pavilion	10,056	10,527	96%	$531,060
July 12, 2011	Oakland	United States	Oracle Arena	7,836	8,510	92%	$428,155
July 13, 2011	San Jose	United States	HP Pavilion at San Jose	9,623	10,162	95%	$513,515
July 15, 2011	Los Angeles	United States	Nokia Theatre L.A. Live	6,537	6,537	100%	$374,125
July 16, 2011	Ontario	United States	Citizens Business Bank Arena	7,845	7,845	100%	$464,985
July 17, 2011	Phoenix	United States	U.S. Airways Center	9,235	9,757	95%	$491,235
July 19, 2011	Oklahoma City	United States	Cox Convention Center	6,910	7,391	94%	$385,210
July 20, 2011	Grand Prairie	United States	Verizon Theatre	6,018	6,018	100%	$339,330
July 21, 2011	Houston	United States	Reliant Arena	6,790	6,790	100%	$380,170
July 22, 2011	New Orleans	United States	UNO Lakefront Arena	5,525	5,525	100%	$326,525
July 24, 2011	Orlando	United States	Amway Center	10,791	11,296	96%	$564,395
July 26, 2011	Duluth	United States	Arena at Gwinnett Center	10,026	10,026	100%	$533,870
July 27, 2011	Raleigh	United States	RBC Center	13,533	13,533	100%	$696,605
July 28, 2011	Charlotte	United States	Time Warner Cable Arena	9,239	9,239	100%	$493,115
July 30, 2011	Nashville	United States	Bridgestone Arena	13,192	13,192	100%	$676,020
July 31, 2011	St. Louis	United States	Scottrade Center	8,580	8,580	100%	$459,800
August 2, 2011	Kansas City	United States	Sprint Center	8,535	8,535	100%	$457,795
August 3, 2011	Minneapolis	United States	Target Center	9,632	9,632	100%	$510,560
August 4, 2011	Milwaukee	United States	Bradley Center	8,646	8,646	100%	$460,930
August 6, 2011	Rosemont	United States	Allstate Arena	11,932	11,932	100%	$613,720
August 7, 2011	Detroit	United States	Joe Louis Arena	8,980	8,980	100%	$480,880
August 9, 2011	Columbus	United States	Jerome Schottenstein Center	9,677	10,135	96%	$508,455
August 10, 2011	Pittsburgh	United States	Consol Energy Center	8,772	9,167	96%	$465,400
August 11, 2011	Baltimore	United States	1st Mariner Arena	7,571	7,974	95%	$420,675
August 13, 2011	Atlantic City	United States	Boardwalk Hall	11,913	11,913	100%	$615,025
August 14, 2011	Newark	United States	Prudential Center	18,529	19,846	93%	$1,009,565
August 15, 2011	Newark	United States	Prudential Center	18,529	19,846	93%	$1,009,565
August 17, 2011	Philadelphia	United States	Wells Fargo Center	9,326	9,848	95%	$501,570
August 19, 2011	Washington, D.C.	United States	Verizon Center	9,064	9,804	93%	$491,220
August 20, 2011	Richmond	United States	Richmond Coliseum	8,183	8,411	97%	$449,475
August 21, 2011	Wilkes-Barre	United States	Mohegan Sun Arena	7,562	7,562	100%	$415,490
August 23, 2011	Uniondale	United States	Nassau Coliseum	18,981	19,613	97%	$1,044,245
August 24, 2011	Uniondale	United States	Nassau Coliseum	18,981	19,613	97%	$1,044,245
August 25, 2011	Bridgeport	United States	Webster Bank Arena	7,942	7,942	100%	$431,730
August 27, 2011	Providence	United States	Dunkin' Donuts Center	8,460	8,460	100%	$457,540
August 30, 2011	Portland	United States	Cumberland County Civic Center	6,070	6,070	100%	$350,550
August 31, 2011	Manchester	United States	Verizon Wireless Arena	8,831	8,831	100%	$473,155
September 1, 2011	Worcester	United States	DCU Center	8,840	9,701	91%	$480,740
September 3, 2011	Uncasville	United States	Mohegan Sun Arena	5,296	5,296	100%	$385,560
September 4, 2011^{a}	Albany	United States	Times Union Center	6,738	7,772	87%	$370,590
September 6, 2011	Syracuse	United States	War Memorial at Oncenter	4,975	5,581	89%	$286,435
September 7, 2011	Reading	United States	Sovereign Center	5,850	6,780	86%	$337,830
September 9, 2011	Toronto	Canada	Air Canada Centre	11,485	11,485	100%	$667,969
September 10, 2011	Rochester	United States	Blue Cross Arena	7,336	7,842	94%	$403,020
Asia
September 20, 2011	Quezon City	Philippines	Smart Araneta Coliseum	13,500	15,000	90%	
September 21, 2011	Quezon City	Philippines	Smart Araneta Coliseum	13,500	15,000	90%	

- ^Note a The Albany show was originally scheduled for August 28 but moved to September 4, 2011, due to Hurricane Irene.

== Response ==
The tour attendance rebounded after the poor turn-out for the Season 9 tour. Sixteen of the first 24 shows were sold out, and more than 97% its tickets hasd been sold through its first 14 dates with an average venue size of 8,100. The tour grossed $22,002,464 from 47 shows (the two Philippines shows did not report) with an attendance of 97%. The tour had the highest number of sell-outs of all seasons due in part to a lower-average venue size of 8,856. It was ranked number 38 in the Pollstar Top 200 North American Tours for 2011.

== Revenue ==
The tour was ranked No. 38 in the list of 2011 Year-end Top 200 North American tours, based on total gross income.
