= American Idol season 10 =

American Idol
- Season 10
- Hosted by: Ryan Seacrest
- Judges: Randy Jackson; Jennifer Lopez; Steven Tyler
- Winner: Scotty McCreery
- Runner-up: Lauren Alaina
- Finals venue: Nokia Theatre L.A. Live

Release
- Original network: Fox
- Original release: January 19 – May 25, 2011

Season chronology
- ← Previous; Season 9 Next → Season 11

The tenth season of American Idol premiered on the Fox television network on January 19, 2011, and concluded on May 25, 2011. The show underwent a number of changes from the ninth season including the return of Nigel Lythgoe as executive producer. Randy Jackson returned as judge for his tenth season, while Jennifer Lopez and Steven Tyler joined the judges' panel after the departures of Simon Cowell, Ellen DeGeneres, and Kara DioGuardi.

Interscope Records, which was part of Universal Music Group, replaced Sony Music Entertainment as Idol's official partner record label. Interscope's chairman Jimmy Iovine, a songwriter and producer, was named as the in-house mentor to work with the contestants on a weekly basis. He was supported by associated producers Rodney Jerkins, Alex da Kid, Tricky Stewart, Don Was, will.i.am, and Timbaland, who all helped the contestants tailor their song choices to their chosen genre of performance, while also producing arrangements for the contestants and offering original material to be performed. Ray Chew replaced Rickey Minor as the show's musical director and leader of Idol's live band.

Programming changes included a move from Tuesdays and Wednesdays to Wednesdays and Thursdays. The show also opened up an option for viewers to cast their votes online through Facebook. Specific changes in the competition itself included extending extra rounds (such as the one in Las Vegas) and a final solo round, while also returning the judges' Wild Card choices. The show also lowered the age of eligibility to fifteen.

On May 25, 2011, after 122.4 million votes were cast for the finale (and nearly 750 million votes all season), Scotty McCreery was crowned the winner of the tenth season of American Idol, with Lauren Alaina as the runner-up. Nine contestants from this season were signed to record labels, including McCreery, Lauren Alaina, Haley Reinhart, James Durbin, Casey Abrams, Stefano Langone, Pia Toscano, Naima Adedapo, and Jimmie Allen.

== Changes from previous seasons ==
Simon Cowell, who had been a judge since the very first season, announced on January 11, 2010, that he would not return as a judge for this season in order to focus on launching the American version of his British singing competition The X Factor. Ellen DeGeneres officially announced her departure on July 29 after judging for only one season, and Kara DioGuardi announced on September 3 that she would also not return. On September 22, 2010, it was announced that Jennifer Lopez and Steven Tyler would join the show as the new permanent judges.

Extra rounds were added in the Hollywood phase of the competition which would narrow the contestants down to 60 finalists. Those who advanced were then taken to Las Vegas, where they were asked to perform a song from The Beatles, and then a further solo round in Los Angeles. It was initially planned to reduce the contestants down to 20 by the end of the Hollywood rounds, however, 24 contestants were chosen instead for the semifinals, and they would perform in two groups of 12, where the public vote determined the top five males and females. The judges were granted three Wild Card picks, bringing the total number of finalists to 13.

At the end of the ninth season, American Idol's affiliation with Sony Music Entertainment ended and was replaced with Universal Music Group. Therefore, the winner would now be signed to Interscope Records. Interscope's sister labels, A&M Records and Geffen Records, were involved in promoting and distributing the albums of the show's finalists. Chairman of the Interscope-Geffen-A&M label group, Jimmy Iovine, worked directly with contestants this season as an in-house mentor. Additionally, a team of Universal Music-associated producers and songwriters, such as Rodney "Darkchild" Jerkins, Timbaland, and Alex da Kid, also worked alongside the contestants to help them take on original arrangement and material.

== Regional auditions ==
Auditions were held in the following cities:

American Idol (season 10) – regional auditions
City	Preliminary date	Preliminary venue	Filming date(s)	Filming venue	Golden tickets
Nashville, Tennessee	July 17, 2010	Bridgestone Arena	October 25–26, 2010	Ryman Auditorium	Unknown (Note: The actual number of golden tickets handed out at this audition city was not announced.)
Milwaukee, Wisconsin	July 21, 2010	Bradley Center	October 2–3, 2010	Milwaukee Art Museum	53
New Orleans, Louisiana	July 26, 2010	New Orleans Arena	October 17–18, 2010	Hilton Riverside Hotel	37
East Rutherford, New Jersey	August 3, 2010	Izod Center	September 28–30, 2010	Liberty House Restaurant	51
Austin, Texas	August 11, 2010	Frank Erwin Center	October 8–9, 2010	Barton Creek Resort & Spa	50
San Francisco, California	August 19, 2010	AT&T Park	November 9–10, 2010	Westin St. Francis	Unknown
Los Angeles, California	September 22, 2010	The Forum	November 3–4, 2010	AT&T Center	Unknown
Total number of tickets to Hollywood					327

The age minimum this season was reduced to 15; the maximum age, however, still remained at 28.

In addition to the above cities, contestants were allowed for the first time to audition online via Myspace, Facebook, or Twitter. To audition, they were required to upload a forty-second audition clip of them singing a pre-approved song. The on-line auditions who were selected to proceed, including Karen Rodriguez, were brought to Los Angeles to audition in front of the judges.

== Hollywood week ==
The Hollywood phase of the competition was held at the Pasadena Civic Center. There were 327 contestants in the first round, which lasted over two days. The contestants emerged in groups of ten and each performed individually a cappella. After the whole group had finished their performances, those who failed were immediately cut and 168 advanced to the next round, where the contestants performed in groups. Out of the 168, only 100 advanced to the next round. In the next round, the contestants performed solo, accompanied by a band or an instrument. The contestants were then separated into four rooms, with two of the four rooms containing eliminated contestants and the other two containing contestants who made it into the next round. Only 61 of the 100 remaining contestants advanced.

This year, due to the large number of contestants, two more rounds were added. The 61 remaining contestants proceeded to Las Vegas, where they performed songs from The Beatles as duos and trios in the Love theater at The Mirage. After that, 41 contestants advanced to a final round in Los Angeles. In that round, each contestant performed a song of their own choice at Howard Hughes' Spruce Goose aircraft hangar. The top 24 were then selected from the remaining 41 for the semifinals.

== Semifinals ==
The semifinal round began on Tuesday, March 1, 2011. The males and females competed on back-to-back nights, and the top five from each group, along with the judges' three Wild Card choices, advanced to the finals.

Color key:

This contestant was chosen by the public and moved on to the live shows.
This contestant was not chosen by the public and was left to perform again for the judges in the Wild Card round.
This contestant was eliminated.

=== Top 24 ===
Contestants are listed in the order they performed.

Top 24 - Male contestants (March 1)
Contestant	Song	Result
Clint Jun Gamboa	"Superstition"	Eliminated
Jovany Barreto	"I'll Be"	Wild Card
Jordan Dorsey	"OMG"	Eliminated
Tim Halperin	"Streetcorner Symphony"	Eliminated
Brett Loewenstern	"Light My Fire"	Eliminated
James Durbin	"You've Got Another Thing Comin'"	Advanced
Robbie Rosen	"Angel"	Wild Card
Scotty McCreery	"Letters from Home"	Advanced
Stefano Langone	"Just the Way You Are"	Wild Card
Paul McDonald	"Maggie May"	Advanced
Jacob Lusk	"A House Is Not a Home"	Advanced
Casey Abrams	"I Put a Spell on You"	Advanced

Top 24 - Female contestants (March 2)
Contestant	Song	Result
Ta-Tynisa Wilson	"Only Girl (In the World)"	Eliminated
Naima Adedapo	"Summertime"	Wild Card
Kendra Chantelle	"Impossible"	Wild Card
Rachel Zevita	"Criminal"	Eliminated
Karen Rodriguez	"Hero"	Advanced
Lauren Turner	"Seven Day Fool"	Eliminated
Ashthon Jones	"Love All Over Me"	Wild Card
Julie Zorrilla	"Breakaway"	Eliminated
Haley Reinhart	"Fallin'"	Advanced
Thia Megia	"Out Here on My Own"	Advanced
Lauren Alaina	"Turn On the Radio"	Advanced
Pia Toscano	"I'll Stand by You"	Advanced

=== Wild Card round ===
After the ten singers who advanced on Thursday, March 3, six of the remaining semifinalists were selected by the judges to compete in the Wild Card round. The judges selected three contestants to advance to the final group of 13. Contestants are listed in the order they performed.

Contestant	Song	Result
Ashthon Jones	"And I Am Telling You I'm Not Going"	Advanced
Stefano Langone	"I Need You Now"	Advanced
Kendra Chantelle	"Georgia on My Mind"	Eliminated
Jovany Barreto	"Angel"	Eliminated
Naima Adedapo	"For All We Know"	Advanced
Robbie Rosen	"Sorry Seems to Be the Hardest Word"	Eliminated

Non-competition performance
Performers	Song
Jennifer Lopez, featuring Pitbull	"On the Floor"

== Top 13 contestants ==
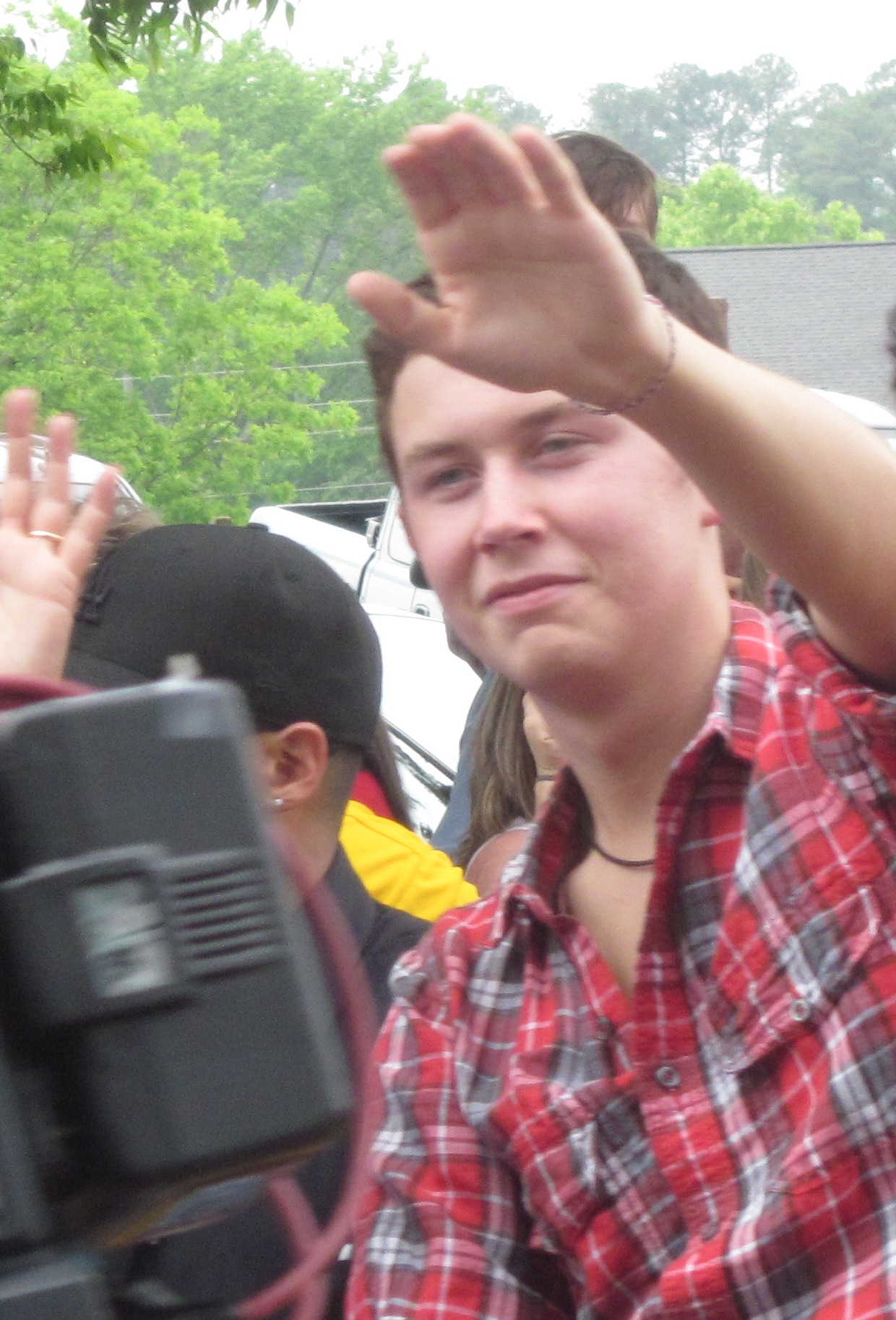
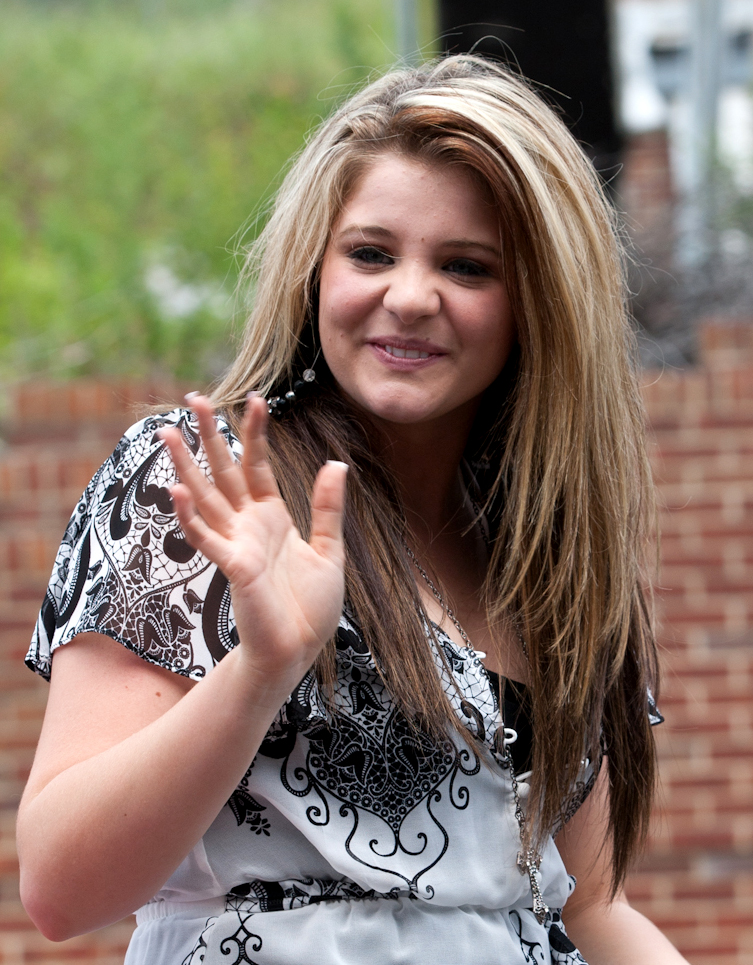
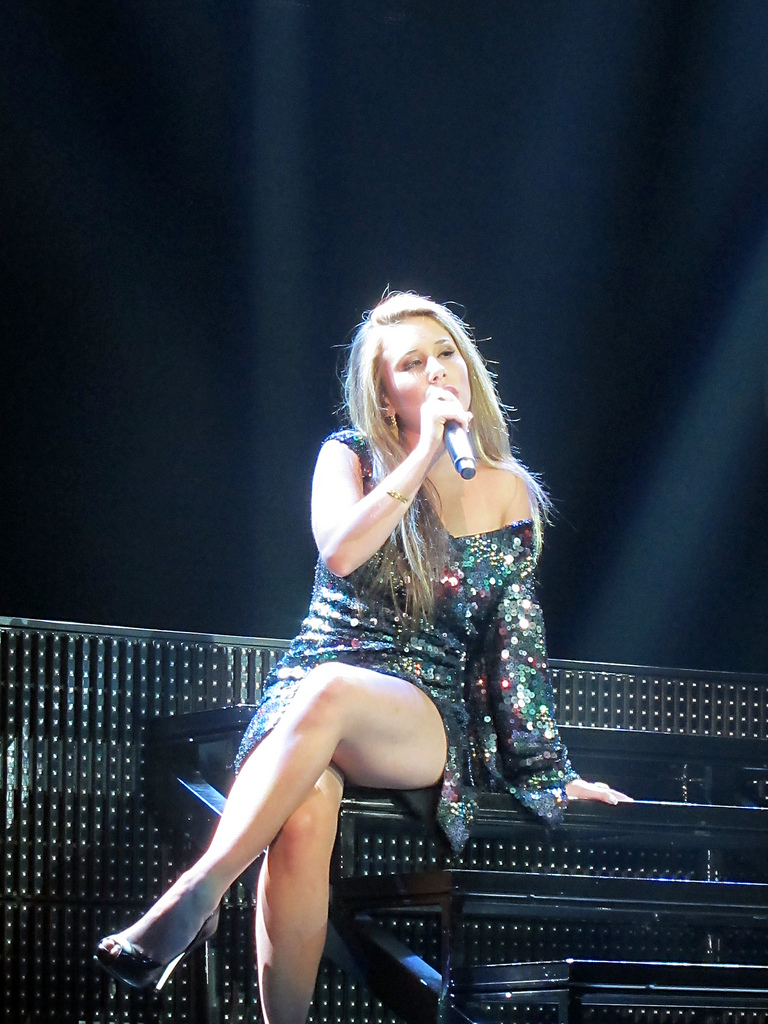
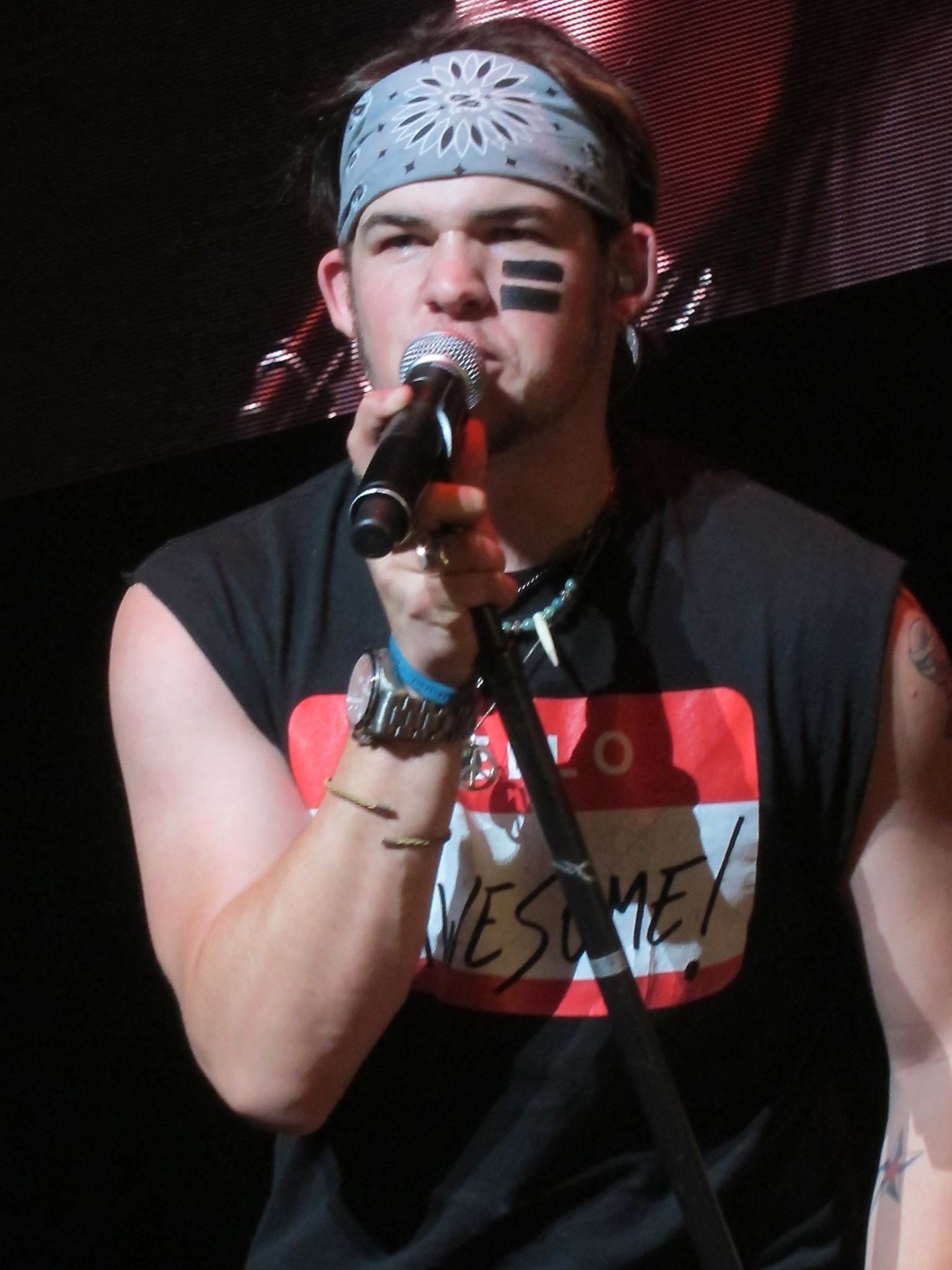
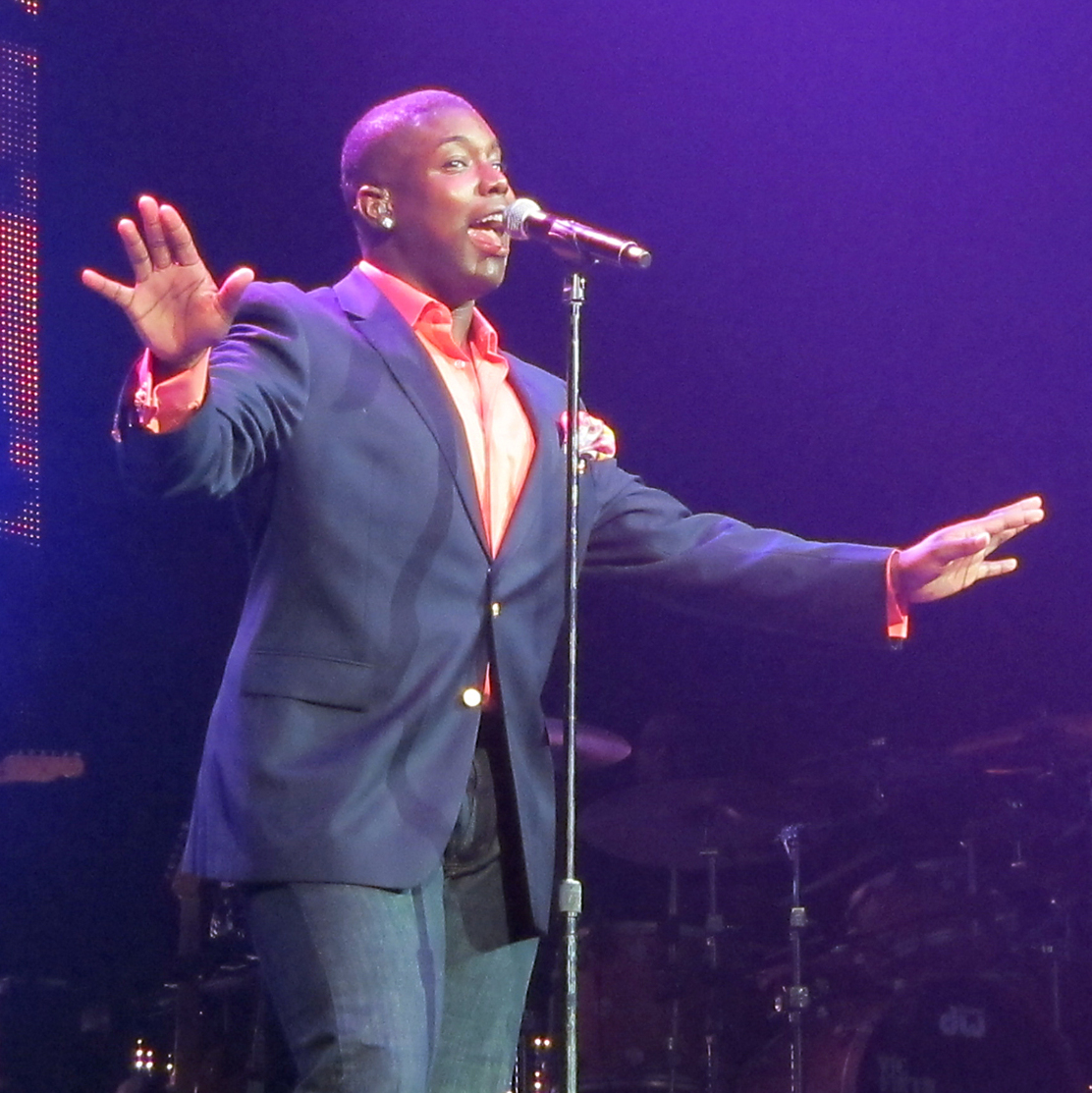
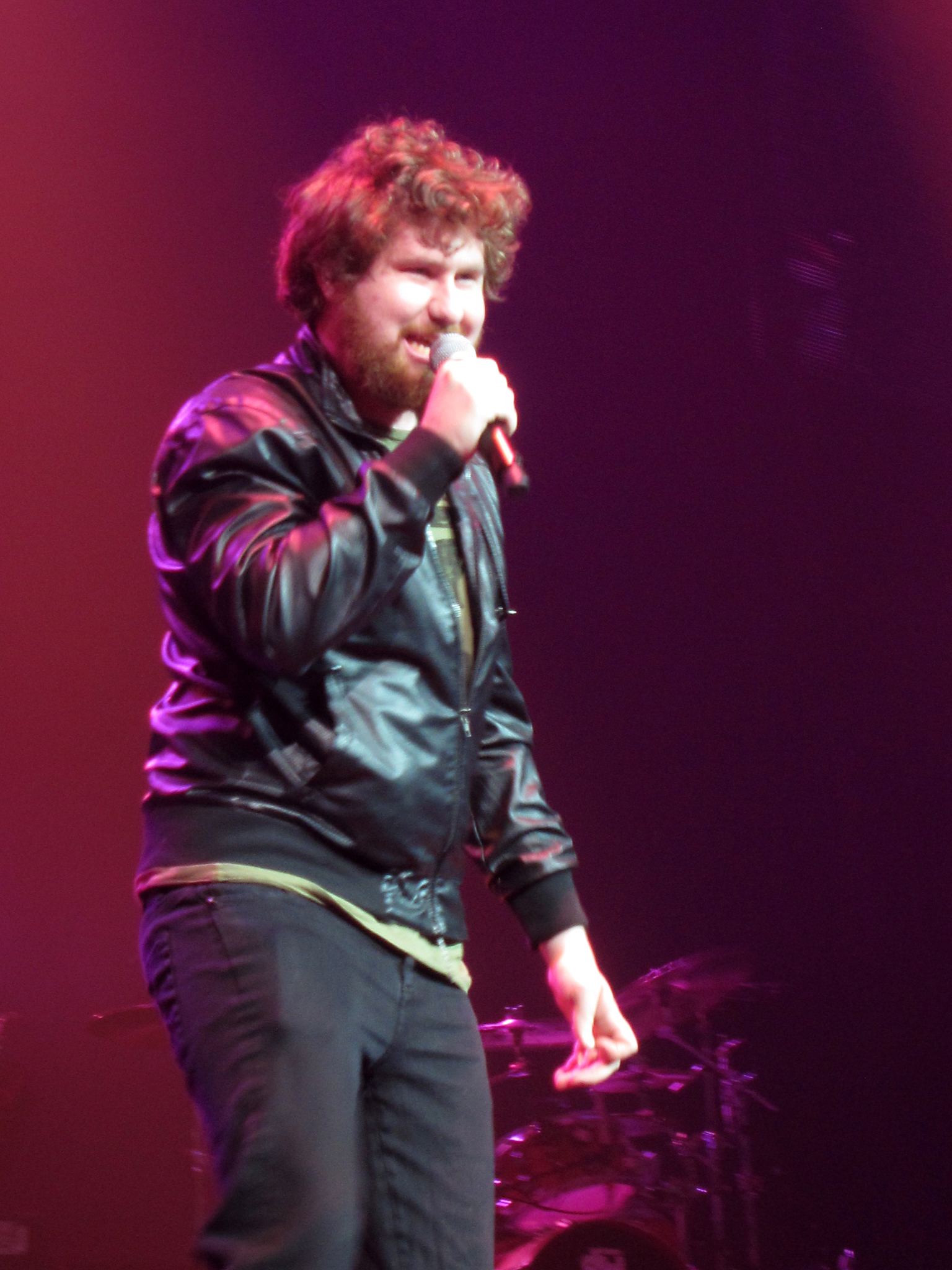
From left to right: Scotty McCreery, Lauren Alaina, Haley Reinhart, James Durbin, Jacob Lusk, and Casey Abrams
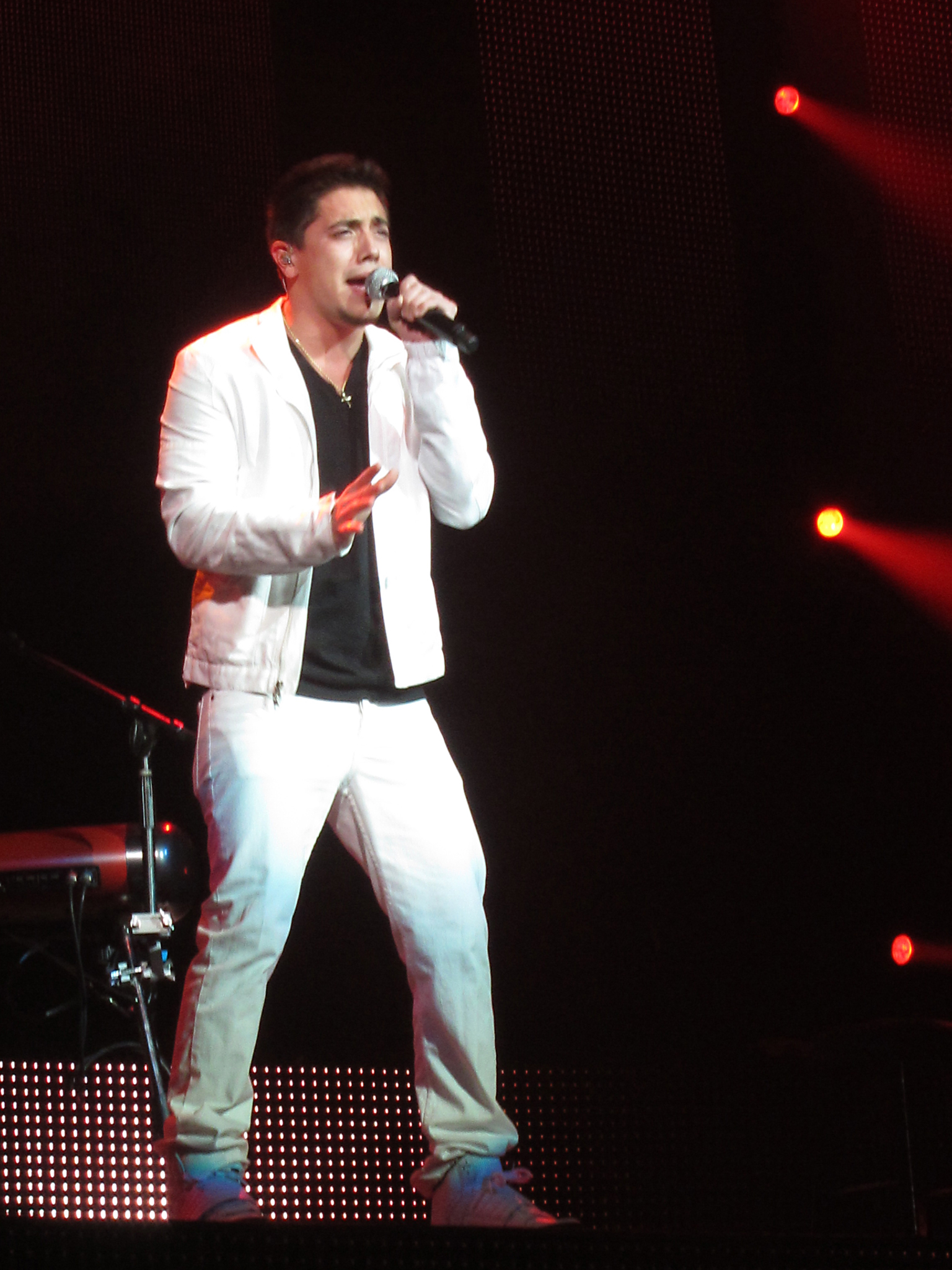
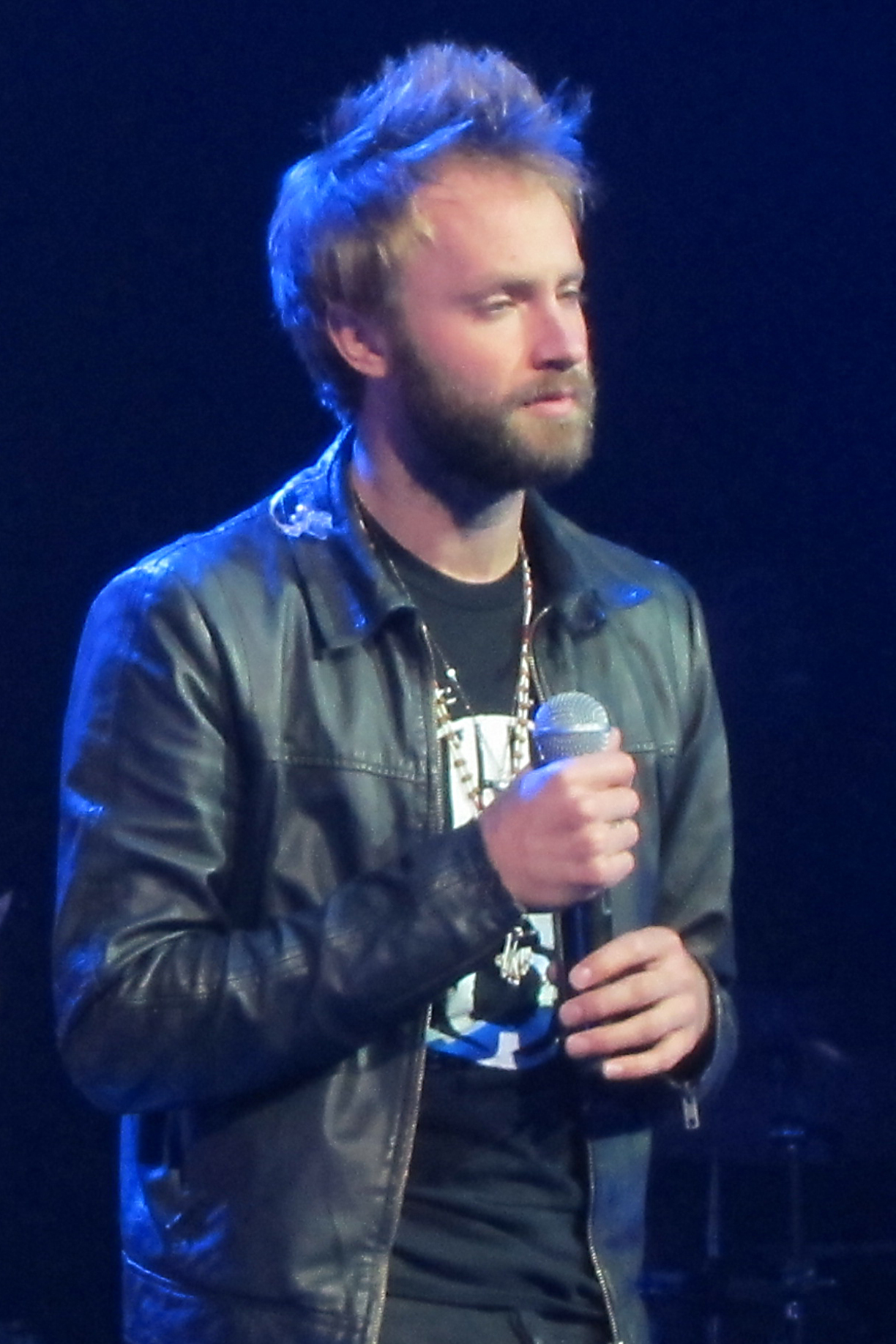
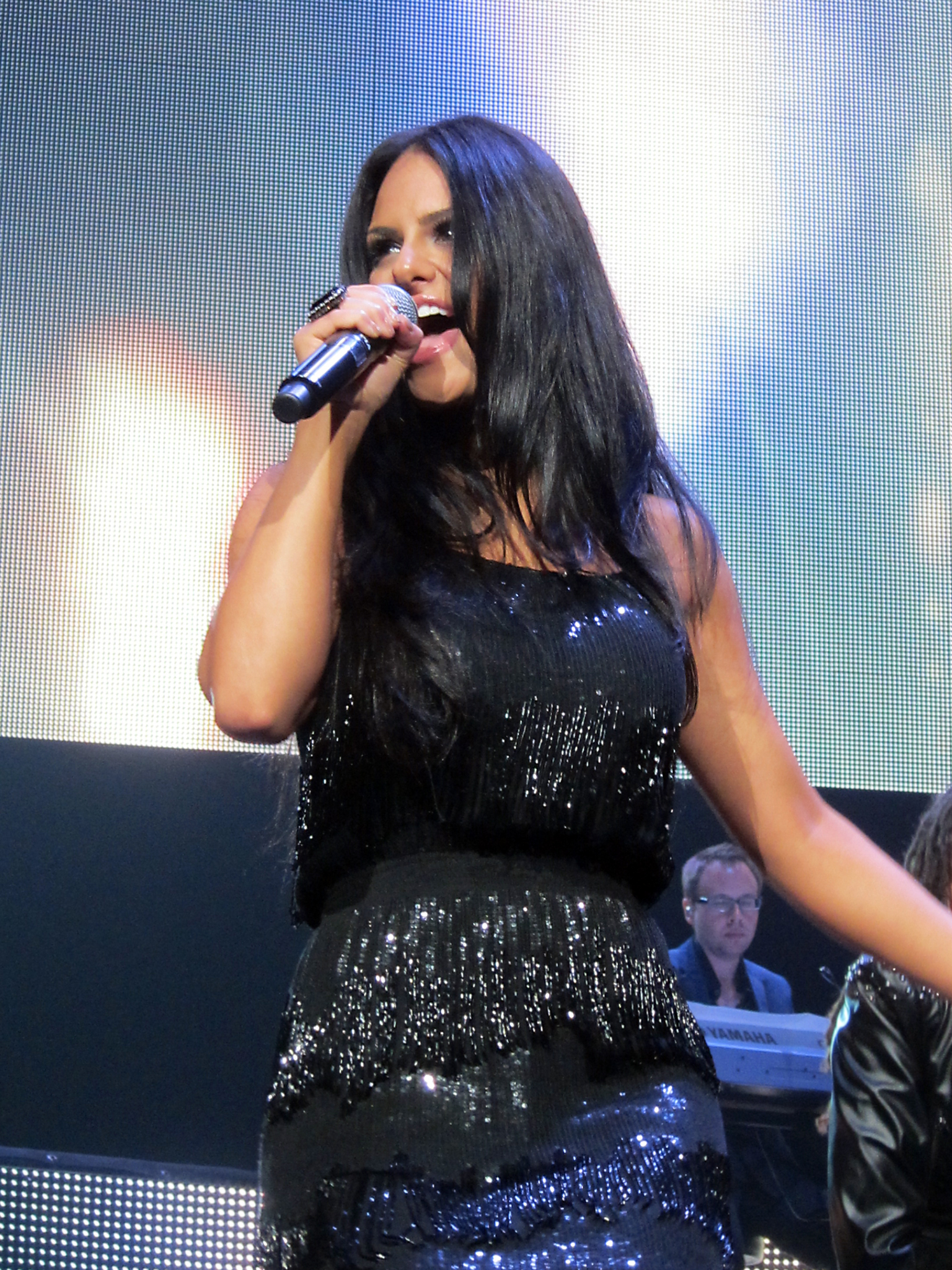
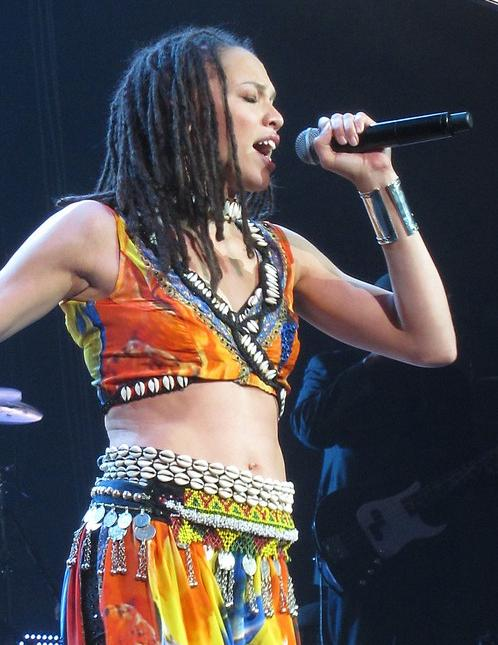
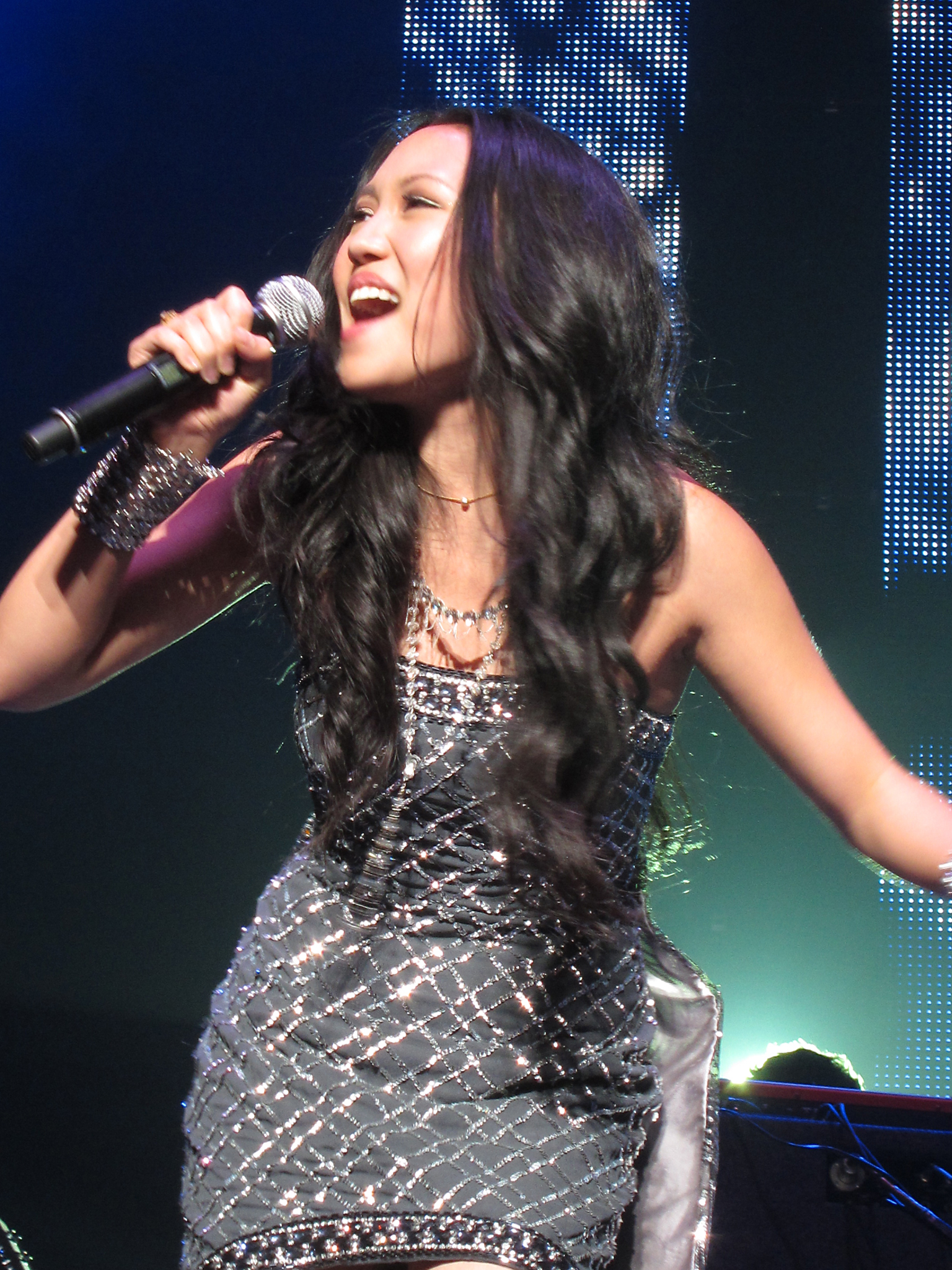
From left to right: Stefano Langone, Paul McDonald, Pia Toscano, Naima Adedapo, and Thia Megia
- Scotty McCreery (born October 9, 1993) was from Garner, North Carolina, and was 17 years old at the time of the show. He auditioned in Milwaukee with Josh Turner's "Your Man" and Travis Tritt's "Put Some Drive in Your Country." He performed "Your Man" in Hollywood, but forgot the words to Lee Ann Womack's "I Hope You Dance." For his final solo, he performed Josh Turner's "Long Black Train."
- Lauren Alaina (born November 8, 1994) was from Rossville, Georgia, and was 16 years old at the time of the show. She auditioned in Nashville with Faith Hill's "Like We Never Loved at All" and Aerosmith's "I Don't Want to Miss a Thing," which she also sang in Hollywood. She also performed "Unchained Melody" twice, once for the first solo in Hollywood and again for the final solo. She performed "Hello, Goodbye" for the Las Vegas round with Scotty McCreery and Denise Jackson.
- Haley Reinhart (born September 9, 1990) was from Wheeling, Illinois, and was 20 years old at the time of the show. She originally auditioned in Chicago in the ninth season, but did not advance to the Hollywood round. She auditioned in Milwaukee with The Beatles' "Oh! Darling." She performed Corinne Bailey Rae's "Breathless" in the first solo round. In Hollywood, she performed Billie Holiday's "God Bless the Child." In the Las Vegas round, she performed the Beatles' "The Long and Winding Road" with Naima Adedapo and Jacob Lusk. For her final solo, she performed the Shirelles' "Baby It's You."
- James Durbin (born January 6, 1989) was from Santa Cruz, California, and was 22 years old at the time of the show. He originally auditioned in the eighth season, but was not selected. He auditioned in San Francisco with Muddy Waters's "You Shook Me" and Aerosmith's "Dream On." He performed the Beatles' "Oh! Darling" for his solo in Hollywood, Queen's "Somebody to Love" in the group round, and Sam Cooke's "A Change Is Gonna Come" for his final solo.
- Jacob Lusk (born June 23, 1987) was from Compton, California, and was 23 years old at the time of the show. He auditioned in Los Angeles. Randy Jackson considered his performance of Billie Holiday's "God Bless the Child" in Hollywood the best ever seen on Idol. He also performed the Temptations' "Get Ready" with Naima Adedapo, and Leon Russell's "A Song for You" for his final solo. In the top 24 round, he earned a standing ovation for his performance of "A House Is Not a Home" by Luther Vandross.
- Casey Abrams (born February 12, 1991) was from Idyllwild, California, and was 20 years old at the time of the show. He auditioned in Austin with Ray Charles' "I Don't Need No Doctor." He impressed the judges with his performance of "Georgia on My Mind" in Hollywood. He also performed Ella Fitzgerald's "Lullaby of Birdland," the Temptations' "Get Ready" in Hollywood, "A Hard Day's Night" in the Las Vegas round, and Kansas Joe McCoy's "Why Don't You Do Right?" for his final solo. He played the double bass and melodica on the show.
- Stefano Langone (born February 27, 1989) was from Kent, Washington, and was 22 years old at the time of the show. He auditioned in San Francisco with Marvin Gaye's "I Heard It Through the Grapevine." He performed Stevie Wonder's "Sir Duke" in Hollywood, "Get Back" in Las Vegas, and his own composition, "Come Home," for his final solo.
- Paul McDonald (born August 29, 1984) was from Huntsville, Alabama, and was 26 years old at the time of the show. He auditioned in Nashville with Rod Stewart's "Maggie May." He performed Fleetwood Mac's "Landslide" and his own composition, "American Dreams," for his final solo.
- Pia Toscano (born October 14, 1988) was from Howard Beach, New York, and was 22 years old at the time of the show. She had auditioned for Idol four times before and made it through to Hollywood in the sixth season, but did not continue further. She auditioned in East Rutherford. She and Karen Rodriguez sang together the Beatles' "Can't Buy Me Love" in Las Vegas. She also performed Bruno Mars's "Grenade" in Hollywood and Alicia Keys's "Doesn't Mean Anything" for her final solo.
- Naima Adedapo (born October 5, 1984) was from Milwaukee, Wisconsin, and was 26 years old at the time of the show. She auditioned in Milwaukee with Donny Hathaway's "For All We Know." She performed the Beatles' "The Long and Winding Road" with Jacob Lusk and Haley Reinhart in Las Vegas, and Corinne Bailey Rae's "Put Your Records On" for her final solo.
- Thia Megia (born January 30, 1995) was from Mountain House, California, and was 16 years old at the time of the show. She auditioned in Milwaukee with Adele's "Chasing Pavements." She performed "Summertime" from Porgy and Bess and Louis Armstrong's "What a Wonderful World" in Hollywood, "Here Comes the Sun" in Las Vegas, and Secret Garden's "You Raise Me Up" for her final solo.
- Karen Rodriguez (born March 22, 1989) was from New York City, New York, and was 21 years old at the time of the show. She was one of the Myspace auditions, who then auditioned in front of the judges in Los Angeles with Whitney Houston's "You Give Good Love." She performed Jennifer Lopez's "If You Had My Love," Bruno Mars's "Just the Way You Are" in Hollywood, and Selena's "No Me Queda Más" in the final round.
- Ashthon Jones (born February 27, 1986) was from Goodlettsville, Tennessee, and was 24 years old at the time of the show. She auditioned in Nashville. She sang "And I Am Telling You I'm Not Going" from Dreamgirls, Blu Cantrell's Hit 'Em Up Style (Oops!) in Hollywood, and Whitney Houston's "I Wanna Dance with Somebody (Who Loves Me)" for her final solo.

== Finals ==
There were twelve weeks of finals with thirteen contestants competing. At least one contestant was eliminated every week based on the public's votes, although the judges could veto one elimination through the use of the "judges' save."

Color key:

This contestant was saved by America's vote.
This contestant was in the bottom two or three, but was saved by America's vote.
This contestant was saved from elimination by the judges.
This contestant was eliminated.
This contestant won American Idol.
This contestant was the runner-up.

=== Top 13 – Personal Idols ===
Contestants performed one song each from their own personal idols, and are listed in the order they performed.

Contestant	Song	Personal idol	Result
Lauren Alaina	"Any Man of Mine"	Shania Twain	Safe
Casey Abrams	"With a Little Help from My Friends"	Joe Cocker	Safe
Ashthon Jones	"When You Tell Me That You Love Me"	Diana Ross	Eliminated
Paul McDonald	"Come Pick Me Up"	Ryan Adams	Safe
Pia Toscano	"All by Myself"	Celine Dion	Safe
James Durbin	"Maybe I'm Amazed"	Paul McCartney	Safe
Haley Reinhart	"Blue"	LeAnn Rimes	Bottom three
Jacob Lusk	"I Believe I Can Fly"	R. Kelly	Safe
Thia Megia	"Smile"	Michael Jackson	Safe
Stefano Langone	"Lately"	Stevie Wonder	Safe
Karen Rodriguez	"I Could Fall in Love"	Selena	Bottom three
Scotty McCreery	"The River"	Garth Brooks	Safe
Naima Adedapo	"Umbrella"	Rihanna	Safe

Non-competition performance
Performers	Song
Top 13	Michael Jackson medley: "Wanna Be Startin' Somethin'" "Rock with You" "Black or White" "Man in the Mirror"
Adam Lambert	"Aftermath"
Diddy – Dirty Money, featuring Skylar Grey	"Coming Home"

=== Top 12 – Contestants' birth year ===
Contestants each performed one song from the year they were born, and are listed in the order they performed.

Contestant	Song	Birth year	Result
Naima Adedapo	"What's Love Got to Do with It"	1984	Bottom three
Paul McDonald	"I Guess That's Why They Call It the Blues"	1984	Safe
Thia Megia	"Colors of the Wind"	1995	Safe
James Durbin	"I'll Be There for You"	1989	Safe
Haley Reinhart	"I'm Your Baby Tonight"	1990	Bottom three
Stefano Langone	"If You Don't Know Me by Now"	1989	Safe
Pia Toscano	"Where Do Broken Hearts Go"	1988	Safe
Scotty McCreery	"Can I Trust You with My Heart"	1993	Safe
Karen Rodriguez	"Love Will Lead You Back"	1989	Eliminated
Casey Abrams	"Smells Like Teen Spirit"	1991	Safe
Lauren Alaina	"I'm the Only One"	1994	Safe
Jacob Lusk	"Alone"	1987	Safe

Non-competition performance
Performers	Song
Top 12	"Born to Be Wild" "Born This Way"
Lee DeWyze	"Beautiful Like You"
The Black Eyed Peas	"Just Can't Get Enough"

=== Top 11 (March 24) – Motown ===
Marc Anthony served as a guest mentor this week, although this was not explicitly mentioned on the show. Contestants are listed in the order they performed. The judges chose to use their "judges' save" when Casey Abrams was announced as the performer to be eliminated. As a result, no one was eliminated this week.

Contestant	Motown song	Result
Casey Abrams	"I Heard It Through the Grapevine"	Saved by the judges
Thia Megia	"Heat Wave"	Bottom three
Jacob Lusk	"You're All I Need to Get By"	Safe
Lauren Alaina	"You Keep Me Hangin' On"	Safe
Stefano Langone	"Hello"	Bottom three
Haley Reinhart	"You've Really Got a Hold on Me"	Safe
Scotty McCreery	"For Once in My Life"	Safe
Pia Toscano	"All in Love Is Fair"	Safe
Paul McDonald	"The Tracks of My Tears"	Safe
Naima Adedapo	"Dancing in the Street"	Safe
James Durbin	"Living for the City"	Safe

Non-competition performance
Performers	Song
Top 11 with Stevie Wonder	"Ain't No Mountain High Enough" "Signed, Sealed, Delivered I'm Yours" "Happy Birthday"
Jennifer Hudson	"Where You At"
Sugarland	"Stuck Like Glue"

=== Top 11 (March 31) – Elton John ===
Contestants performed one song each from Elton John's discography, and are listed in the order they performed. Two contestants were eliminated.

Contestant	Elton John song	Result
Scotty McCreery	"Country Comfort"	Safe
Naima Adedapo	"I'm Still Standing"	Eliminated
Paul McDonald	"Rocket Man"	Bottom three
Pia Toscano	"Don't Let the Sun Go Down on Me"	Safe
Stefano Langone	"Tiny Dancer"	Safe
Lauren Alaina	"Candle in the Wind"	Safe
James Durbin	"Saturday Night's Alright for Fighting"	Safe
Thia Megia	"Daniel"	Eliminated
Casey Abrams	"Your Song"	Safe
Jacob Lusk	"Sorry Seems to Be the Hardest Word"	Safe
Haley Reinhart	"Bennie and the Jets"	Safe

Non-competition performance
Performers	Song
Lauren Alaina and Scotty McCreery	"I Told You So"
Naima Adedapo and Jacob Lusk	"Solid"
Thia Megia, Haley Reinhart, and Pia Toscano	"Teenage Dream"
Casey Abrams, James Durbin, Stefano Langone, and Paul McDonald	"Band on the Run"
Fantasia	"Collard Greens & Cornbread"
will.i.am and Jamie Foxx	"Hot Wings (I Wanna Party)"

=== Top 9 – Rock and Roll Hall of Fame ===
will.i.am served as a guest mentor this week, alongside in-house mentor Jimmy Iovine during dress rehearsals. Russell Brand did not mentor them individually, but did entertain them as a group, while coaching them on stage presence and confidence. Contestants are listed in the order they performed.

Contestant	Rock and roll song	Result
Jacob Lusk	"Man in the Mirror"	Bottom three
Haley Reinhart	"Piece of My Heart"	Safe
Casey Abrams	"Have You Ever Seen the Rain?"	Safe
Lauren Alaina	"(You Make Me Feel Like) A Natural Woman"	Safe
James Durbin	"While My Guitar Gently Weeps"	Safe
Scotty McCreery	"That's All Right"	Safe
Pia Toscano	"River Deep – Mountain High"	Eliminated
Stefano Langone	"When a Man Loves a Woman"	Bottom three
Paul McDonald	"Folsom Prison Blues"	Safe

Non-competition performance
Performers	Song
Top 9	"I Love Rock 'n' Roll" "The Letter" "Sweet Home Alabama"
Constantine Maroulis	"Unchained Melody"
Iggy Pop	"Wild One"

=== Top 8 – Movie soundtracks ===
will.i.am served as a guest mentor this week, alongside in-house mentor Jimmy Iovine during dress rehearsals. Rob Reiner did not mentor individually, but did give the top eight a group pep talk. Contestants chose songs featured in movies, and are listed in the order they performed.

Contestant	Song	Film	Result
Paul McDonald	"Old Time Rock and Roll"	Risky Business	Eliminated
Lauren Alaina	"The Climb"	Hannah Montana: The Movie	Safe
Stefano Langone	"End of the Road"	Boomerang	Bottom three
Scotty McCreery	"I Cross My Heart"	Pure Country	Safe
Casey Abrams	"Nature Boy"	The Boy with Green Hair	Safe
Haley Reinhart	"Call Me"	American Gigolo	Bottom three
Jacob Lusk	"Bridge over Troubled Water"	The Pursuit of Happyness	Safe
James Durbin	"Heavy Metal"	Heavy Metal	Safe

Non-competition performance
Performers	Song
Lauren Alaina and Scotty McCreery	"American Honey"
Casey Abrams and Haley Reinhart	"Moanin'"
James Durbin, Stefano Langone, Jacob Lusk, and Paul McDonald	"The Sound of Silence" "Mrs. Robinson"
Jason Aldean and Kelly Clarkson	"Don't You Wanna Stay"
Rihanna	"California King Bed"

=== Top 7 – Music from the 21st century ===
Contestants are listed in the order they performed.

Contestant	Song	Result
Scotty McCreery	"Swingin'"	Safe
James Durbin	"Uprising"	Safe
Haley Reinhart	"Rolling in the Deep"	Bottom three
Jacob Lusk	"Dance with My Father"	Bottom three
Casey Abrams	"Harder to Breathe"	Safe
Stefano Langone	"Closer"	Eliminated
Lauren Alaina	"Born to Fly"	Safe

Non-competition performance
Performers	Song
Naima Adedapo, Ashthon Jones, Paul McDonald, Thia Megia, Karen Rodriguez, and Pia Toscano	"So What"
Lauren Alaina, Stefano Langone, Jacob Lusk, and Haley Reinhart	"Hey, Soul Sister"
Casey Abrams, James Durbin, and Scotty McCreery	"Viva la Vida"
David Cook	"The Last Goodbye"
Katy Perry, featuring Kanye West	"E.T."

=== Top 6 – Carole King ===
Babyface served as a guest mentor this week. Each contestant performed two songs from the Carole King discography: one solo and one duet with a fellow contestant. Contestants are listed in the order they performed.

Contestant	Order	Carole King song	Result
Jacob Lusk	1	"Oh No Not My Baby"	Safe
Lauren Alaina	2	"Where You Lead"	Safe
Scotty McCreery	4	"You've Got a Friend"	Safe
James Durbin	5	"Will You Love Me Tomorrow"	Safe
Casey Abrams	7	"That Old Sweet Roll (Hi-De-Ho)"	Eliminated
Haley Reinhart	8	"Beautiful"	Safe
Casey Abrams and Haley Reinhart	3	"I Feel the Earth Move"	
Lauren Alaina and Scotty McCreery	6	"Up on the Roof"	
James Durbin and Jacob Lusk	9	"I'm into Something Good"	

Non-competition performance
Performers	Song
Top 6	Carole King medley: "It Might as Well Rain Until September" "Take Good Care of My Baby" "One Fine Day" "Go Away Little Girl" "It's Too Late"
Crystal Bowersox	"Ridin with the Radio"
Bruno Mars	"The Lazy Song"

=== Top 5 – Music from the new millennium & the 1960s ===
Sheryl Crow served as a guest mentor this week. Each contestant performed two songs: one from the new millennium and one from the 1960s. Contestants are listed in the order they performed.

Contestant	Order	Song	Result
James Durbin	1	"Closer to the Edge"	Safe
James Durbin	6	"Without You"	Safe
Jacob Lusk	2	"No Air"	Eliminated
Jacob Lusk	7	"Love Hurts"	Eliminated
Lauren Alaina	3	"Flat on the Floor"	Bottom two
Lauren Alaina	8	"Unchained Melody"	Bottom two
Scotty McCreery	4	"Gone"	Safe
Scotty McCreery	9	"Always on My Mind"	Safe
Haley Reinhart	5	"You and I"	Safe
Haley Reinhart	10	"The House of the Rising Sun"	Safe

Non-competition performance
Performers	Song
Top 5	"Happy Together"
Lady Antebellum	"Just a Kiss"
Jennifer Lopez, featuring Pitbull	"On the Floor"
Jennifer Lopez, featuring Lil Wayne	"I'm Into You"

=== Top 4 – Inspirational music & Leiber and Stoller ===
Lady Gaga served as a guest mentor this week. Each contestant performed two songs, one of which was written by songwriting duo Jerry Leiber and Mike Stoller. Contestants are listed in the order they performed.

Contestant	Order	Song	Result
James Durbin	1	"Don't Stop Believin'"	Eliminated
James Durbin	8	"Love Potion No. 9"	Eliminated
Haley Reinhart	2	"Earth Song"	Safe
Haley Reinhart	5	"I (Who Have Nothing)"	Safe
Scotty McCreery	3	"Where Were You (When the World Stopped Turning)"	Safe
Scotty McCreery	6	"Young Blood"	Safe
Lauren Alaina	4	"Anyway"	Safe
Lauren Alaina	7	"Trouble"	Safe

Non-competition performance
Performers	Song
James Durbin & Scotty McCreery	"Start a Band"
Lauren Alaina & Haley Reinhart	"Gunpowder & Lead"
Lady Gaga	"You and I"
Enrique Iglesias	"Dirty Dancer"
Jordin Sparks	"I Am Woman"
Steven Tyler	"(It) Feels So Good"

=== Top 3 ===
Beyoncé served as a guest mentor this week. Each contestant performed three songs: one chosen by the contestant, one chosen by mentor Jimmy Iovine, and one chosen by the judges. Contestants are listed in the order they performed.

Contestant	Order	Song	Result
Scotty McCreery	1	"Amazed"	Safe
Scotty McCreery	4	"Are You Gonna Kiss Me or Not" (Note: Song chosen by Jimmy Iovine.)	Safe
Scotty McCreery	7	"She Believes in Me"	Safe
Lauren Alaina	2	"Wild One"	Safe
Lauren Alaina	5	"If I Die Young"	Safe
Lauren Alaina	8	"I Hope You Dance"	Safe
Haley Reinhart	3	"What Is and What Should Never Be"	Eliminated
Haley Reinhart	6	"Rhiannon"	Eliminated
Haley Reinhart	9	"You Oughta Know"	Eliminated

Non-competition performance
Performers	Song
Nicole Scherzinger, featuring 50 Cent	"Right There"
Il Volo	"'O sole mio"
Beyoncé	"Run the World (Girls)"

=== Top 2 – Finale ===
Lauren Alaina damaged her vocal cords while rehearsing for the finale, but she was treated and cleared to continue in the competition. Breaking from tradition, the judges did not offer their critiques of the performances until after both contestants had sung both of their opening songs, and then the critiques were delivered to both contestants at the same time. Each contestant performed three songs, one of which was chosen by their personal musical idol. Contestants are listed in the order they performed.

Contestant	Order	Song	Result
Scotty McCreery	1	"Gone"	Winner
Scotty McCreery	3	"Check Yes or No" (Note: Song chosen by George Strait.)	Winner
Scotty McCreery	5	"I Love You This Big"	Winner
Lauren Alaina	2	"Flat on the Floor"	Runner-up
Lauren Alaina	4	"Maybe It Was Memphis" (Note: Song chosen by Carrie Underwood.)	Runner-up
Lauren Alaina	6	"Like My Mother Does"	Runner-up

Non-competition performance
Performers	Song
David Cook	"Don't You (Forget About Me)"
Taio Cruz	"Positive"
Top 13	"Born This Way"
James Durbin with Judas Priest	"Living After Midnight" "Breaking the Law"
Jacob Lusk with Gladys Knight and Kirk Franklin	"I Smile"
Casey Abrams with Jack Black	"Fat Bottomed Girls"
Haley Reinhart, Pia Toscano, Naima Adedapo, Thia Megia, Karen Rodriguez, and Ashthon Jones with Beyoncé	Beyoncé medley: "Single Ladies (Put a Ring on It)" "Irreplaceable" "Get Me Bodied" "If I Were a Boy" "Deja Vu" "Crazy in Love"
Haley Reinhart with Tony Bennett	"Steppin' Out with My Baby"
Lil Jon	"Come Get Some"
Lauren Alaina, Haley Reinhart, Pia Toscano, Naima Adedapo, Thia Megia, Karen Rodriguez, and Ashthon Jones with TLC	"Come Get Some" "No Scrubs" "Waterfalls"
Scotty McCreery with Tim McGraw	"Live Like You Were Dying"
Marc Anthony, Jennifer Lopez, and Sheila E.	"Aguanile" from El Cantante
Scotty McCreery, James Durbin, Jacob Lusk, Casey Abrams, Stefano Langone, and Paul McDonald with Tom Jones	"Kiss" "She's a Lady" "What's New, Pussycat?" "Green, Green Grass of Home" "Love Me Tonight" "Delilah" "It's Not Unusual"
Lady Gaga	"The Edge of Glory"
Lauren Alaina with Carrie Underwood	"Before He Cheats"
Beyoncé	"1+1"
Reeve Carney with Bono and The Edge	"Rise Above 1"
Steven Tyler	"Dream On"
Scotty McCreery	"I Love You This Big"

== Elimination chart ==
Color key:

Winner
Runner-up
Did not perform
Saved by the public
Saved by the judges
Bottom two or three
Eliminated

American Idol (season 8) - Eliminations
Contestant	Pl.	Semifinals		Wild Card	Top 13	Top 12	Top 11 (Note: Because the judges used their one "judges' save" to save Casey Abrams, the top 11 remained intact for another week.)		Top 9	Top 8	Top 7	Top 6	Top 5	Top 4	Top 3	Finale
Contestant	Pl.	3/1	3/2	3/3	3/10	3/17	3/24	3/31	4/7	4/14	4/21	4/28	5/4	5/11	5/18	5/25
Scotty McCreery	1	Safe	N/A	N/A	Safe	Safe	Safe	Safe	Safe	Safe	Safe	Safe	Safe	Safe	Safe	Winner
Lauren Alaina	2	N/A	Safe	N/A	Safe	Safe	Safe	Safe	Safe	Safe	Safe	Safe	Bottom two	Safe	Safe	Runner-up
Haley Reinhart	3	N/A	Safe	N/A	Bottom three	Bottom three	Safe	Safe	Safe	Bottom three	Bottom three	Safe	Safe	Safe	Eliminated	
James Durbin	4	Safe	N/A	N/A	Safe	Safe	Safe	Safe	Safe	Safe	Safe	Safe	Safe	Eliminated		
Jacob Lusk	5	Safe	N/A	N/A	Safe	Safe	Safe	Safe	Bottom three	Safe	Bottom three	Safe	Eliminated			
Casey Abrams	6	Safe	N/A	N/A	Safe	Safe	Saved	Safe	Safe	Safe	Safe	Eliminated				
Stefano Langone	7	Wild Card	N/A	Saved	Safe	Safe	Bottom three	Safe	Bottom three	Bottom three	Eliminated					
Paul McDonald	8	Safe	N/A	N/A	Safe	Safe	Safe	Bottom three	Safe	Eliminated						
Pia Toscano	9	N/A	Safe	N/A	Safe	Safe	Safe	Safe	Eliminated							
Naima Adedapo	10	N/A	Wild Card	Saved	Safe	Bottom three	Safe	Eliminated								
Thia Megia	10	N/A	Safe	N/A	Safe	Safe	Bottom three	Eliminated								
Karen Rodriguez	12	N/A	Safe	N/A	Bottom three	Eliminated										
Ashthon Jones	13	N/A	Wild Card	Saved	Eliminated											
Jovany Barreto		Wild Card	N/A	Eliminated												
Kendra Chantelle		N/A	Wild Card	Eliminated												
Robbie Rosen		Wild Card	N/A	Eliminated												
Lauren Turner		N/A	Eliminated													
Ta-Tynisa Wilson		N/A	Eliminated													
Rachel Zevita		N/A	Eliminated													
Julie Zorrilla		N/A	Eliminated													
Jordan Dorsey		Eliminated														
Clint Jun Gamboa		Eliminated														
Tim Halperin		Eliminated														
Brett Loewenstern		Eliminated														

== U.S. Nielsen ratings ==
American Idol ended the 2010–2011 television season as the number one and number two show in Total Viewers, and the number one and number three show in Adults 18–49. The Wednesday performance shows earned an average of 25.864 million viewers and an 8.8/24 rating in the Adults 18–49 demographic, while the Thursday results show earned an average of 23.798 million viewers and a 7.7/22 rating in the Adults 18–49 demographic. The show's success helped Fox network achieve the longest winning streak in broadcast history of seven consecutive season in the Adult 18–49 demo.

Episode list

Show #	Episode	Airdate	U.S. viewers (millions)	Rating/share Households	Rating/Share (18–49)	Note	Weekly rank
1	East Rutherford Auditions	January 19, 2011	26.23	14.2 / 22	9.7 / 26		3
2	New Orleans Auditions	January 20, 2011	22.90	12.5 / 20	7.8 / 21		4
3	Milwaukee Auditions	January 26, 2011	25.33	13.8 / 22	9.2 / 24		1
4	Nashville Auditions	January 27, 2011	22.48	12.4 / 20	7.7 / 21		2
5	Austin Auditions	February 2, 2011	25.14	13.4 / 21	9.0 / 24		4
6	Los Angeles Auditions	February 3, 2011	21.89	11.9 / 19	7.5 / 20		6
7	San Francisco Auditions	February 9, 2011	24.05	13.0 / 21	8.4 / 23		2
8	Hollywood Round, Part 1	February 10, 2011	21.94	12.0 / 19	7.3 / 20		3
9	Hollywood Round, Part 2	February 16, 2011	23.20	12.7 / 20	8.2 / 23		1
10	Hollywood Round, Part 3	February 17, 2011	22.18	12.0 / 20	7.6 / 22		2
11	Las Vegas Round/Top 24 Chosen, Part 1	February 23, 2011	22.72	12.5 / 20	7.9 / 21		3
12	Top 24 Chosen, Part 2	February 24, 2011	21.76	11.9 / 19	7.2 / 20		4
13	Top 12 Males Perform	March 1, 2011	21.39	11.7 / 18	7.6 / 21		3
14	Top 12 Females Perform	March 2, 2011	22.77	12.7 / 20	7.8 / 22		2
15	Top 10 Finalists + 3 WCs Revealed	March 3, 2011	25.26	13.8 / 23	8.2 / 24		1
16	Top 13 Finalists Perform	March 9, 2011	24.40	13.5 / 22	8.1 / 23		1
17	Top 13 Results Show	March 10, 2011	22.05	12.6 / 20	6.7 / 19		2
18	Top 12 Finalists Perform	March 16, 2011	22.58	12.9 / 21	7.6 / 22		1
19	Top 12 Results Show	March 17, 2011	19.57	11.2 / 20	5.7 / 19		2
20	Top 11 Finalists Perform	March 23, 2011	23.95	13.5 / 22	7.9 / 22		1
21	Top 11 Results Show	March 24, 2011	21.30	12.1 / 20	6.4 / 20		3
22	Top 11 Part 2 Finalists Perform	March 30, 2011	24.18	13.6 / 21	7.7 / 21		1
23	Top 11 Part 2 Results Show	March 31, 2011	22.63	12.9 / 21	6.8 / 20		3
24	Top 9 Finalists Perform	April 6, 2011	23.13	13.2 / 21	7.3 / 21		1
25	Top 9 Results Show	April 7, 2011	21.54	12.3 / 20	6.4 / 20		3
26	Top 8 Finalists Perform	April 13, 2011	23.03	12.7 / 20	7.3 / 21		1
27	Top 8 Results Show	April 14, 2011	21.92	12.5 / 21	6.4 / 20		2
28	Top 7 Finalists Perform	April 20, 2011	22.54	12.7 / 20	7.1 / 20		1
29	Top 7 Results Show	April 21, 2011	20.32	11.5 / 20	5.8 / 19		2
30	Top 6 Finalists Perform	April 27, 2011	22.32	12.6 / 20	7.1 / 20		2
31	Top 6 Results Show	April 28, 2011	19.60	11.5 / 19	5.7 / 17		3
32	Top 5 Finalists Perform	May 4, 2011	21.14	12.2 / 19	6.6 / 19		3
33	Top 5 Results Show	May 5, 2011	21.29	12.2 / 21	6.3 / 20		2
34	Top 4 Finalists Perform	May 11, 2011	23.05	13.0 / 21	7.1 / 20		1
35	Top 4 Results Show	May 12, 2011	22.45	12.6 / 21	6.5 / 20		2
36	Top 3 Finalists Perform	May 18, 2011	23.56	13.3 / 21	7.4 / 20		1
37	Top 3 Results Show	May 19, 2011	21.76	12.5 / 21	6.3 / 20		3
38	Top 2 Finalists Perform	May 24, 2011	20.57	11.4 / 18	6.4 / 19		4
39	Winner Revealed	May 25, 2011	29.29	15.6 / 25	9.2 / 26		1

== See also ==
- American Idols LIVE! Tour 2011
