= Paul McDonald (musician) =

American singer-songwriter

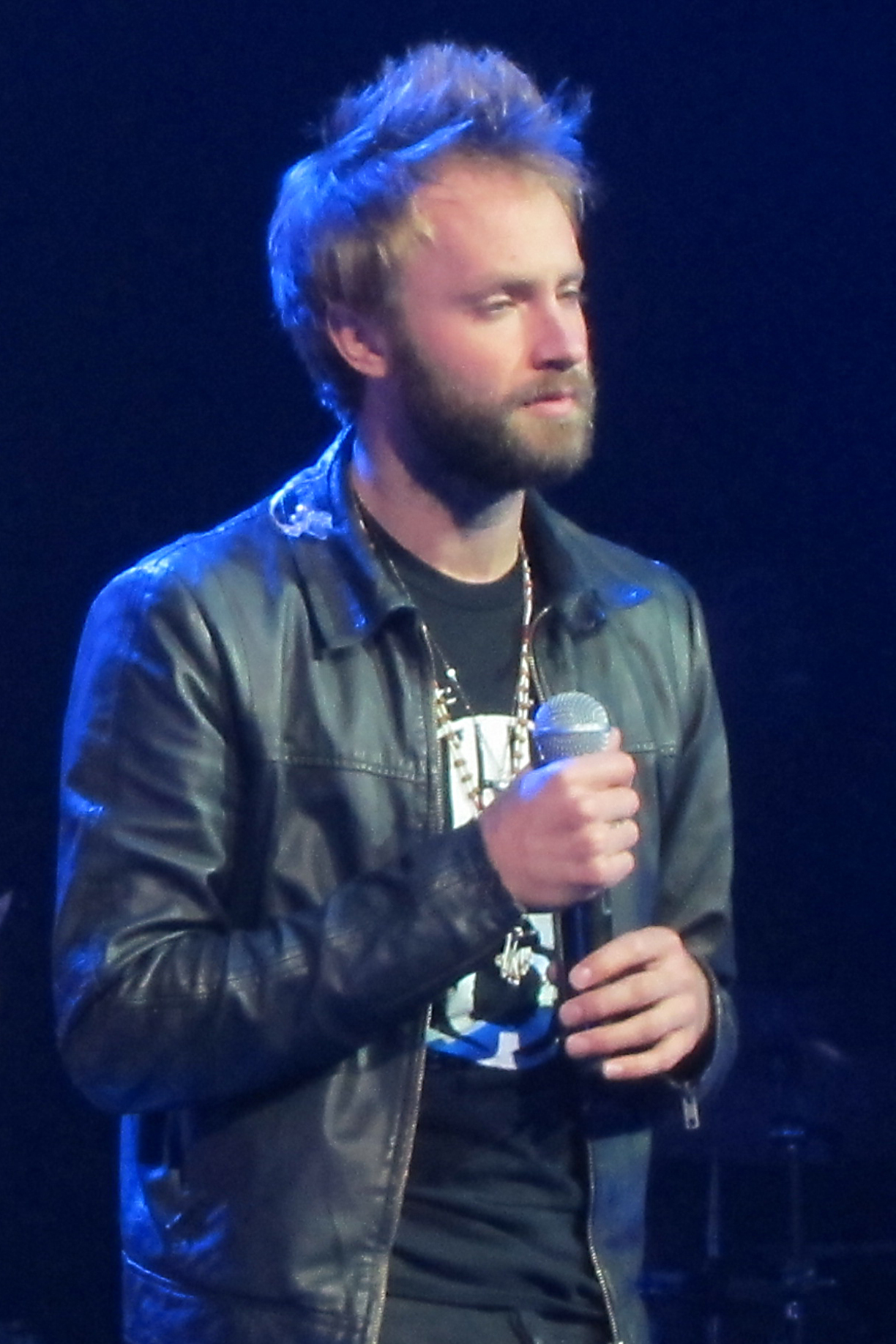

Background information
- Born: William Paul McDonald; Auburn, Alabama, U.S.
- Origin: Huntsville, Alabama; Nashville, Tennessee
- Genre: Rock
- Occupations: Artist; singer-songwriter
- Instruments: Vocals; guitars; piano; tambourine
- Years active: 2005–present
- Website: thepaulmcdonald.com

Paul McDonald (born William Paul McDonald) is an American singer-songwriter from Huntsville, Alabama, who as of 2011 resides in Nashville. McDonald placed 8th on the tenth season of American Idol and since 2005, he has been the lead singer of the band Hightide Blues which was renamed The Grand Magnolias in 2010.

== Early life ==
McDonald was born to Susan and David McDonald, in Auburn/Opelika. McDonald was raised in Huntsville, Alabama.

== Career ==
=== The Grand Magnolias ===
In August 2010, McDonald and his band members moved to Nashville and launched a campaign to let their fans choose a new name for the band. The group's first album under its new name, entitled The Grand Magnolias, was released in 2011. The songs were written by McDonald and band member Jonathan Pears and produced by Dan Hannon and Ken Coomer. The album has seen a boost in sales since Paul McDonald's appearance on American Idol, and it reached number twelve on the Billboard Heatseekers chart and had sold 9,000 copies by April 27, 2011. iTunes pulled the album from its store, without explanation, and the sales dropped off 60% from the previous week. A week later the album returned, again without explanation.

When the band learned that McDonald had made it through to the Hollywood round they put together a content release campaign to maximize the exposure from the show.

=== American Idol ===
On January 27, 2011, McDonald received a golden ticket to compete in Hollywood from judges Steven Tyler, Jennifer Lopez and Randy Jackson, and made it into the Top 24 by singing an original song, "American Dreams." He was one of ten candidates chosen as a finalist based on public voting. Thirteen competed in the finals.

Since entering the competition, McDonald has made use of the social networking site Twitter to communicate with his fans and promote his band, The Grand Magnolias. The album also debuted on the Billboard Heatseekers chart before McDonald even sang in the show's semi-final round. He was the first 2011 Idol hopeful to reach 50,000 followers on his newly created official American Idol Twitter account. McDonald continues to be one of the most popular American Idol Season 10 competitors on the social networking site.

McDonald was eliminated from the show on April 14, 2011, finishing in eighth place.

==== Performances and results ====
Episode	Theme	Song choice	Original artist	Order #	Result
Audition	Auditioner's Choice	"Tutti Frutti"	Little Richard	N/A	Advanced
Audition	Auditioner's Choice	"Maggie May"	Rod Stewart	N/A	Advanced
Hollywood Round, Part 1	First Solo	N/A	Grace Potter and the Nocturnals	N/A	Advanced
Hollywood Round, Part 2	Group Performance	"Carry On Wayward Son"	Kansas	N/A	Advanced
Hollywood Round, Part 3	Second Solo	"Landslide"	Fleetwood Mac	N/A	Advanced
Las Vegas Round	Songs of The Beatles Group Performance	"Blackbird"	The Beatles	N/A	Advanced
Hollywood Round Final	Final Solo	"American Dreams"	The Grand Magnolias	N/A	Advanced
Top 24 (12 Men)	Personal Choice	"Maggie May"	Rod Stewart	10	Advanced
Top 13	Your Personal Idol	"Come Pick Me Up"	Ryan Adams	4	Safe
Top 12	Year You Were Born	"I Guess That's Why They Call It the Blues"	Elton John	2	Safe
Top 11	Motown	"The Tracks of My Tears"	The Miracles	9	Safe
Top 11^{1}	Elton John	"Rocket Man"	Elton John	3	Bottom 3^{2}
Top 9	Rock & Roll Hall of Fame	"Folsom Prison Blues"	Johnny Cash	9	Safe
Top 8	Songs from the Movies	"Old Time Rock and Roll" — Risky Business	Bob Seger	1	Eliminated

- ^Note 1 Due to the judges using their one save to save Casey Abrams, the Top 11 remained intact for another week, when two contestants were eliminated.
- ^Note 2 When Ryan Seacrest announced the results in the particular night, McDonald was in the bottom three, but was the only contestant declared safe as both Naima Adedapo and Thia Megia were eliminated.

=== Post-Idol ===
McDonald was one of the 11 performers in the 2011 American Idols Live Tour, which began in West Valley City, Utah, on July 6, 2011, and ended in Rochester, New York, on September 10, 2011. On May 25, 2011, he appeared on Rachael Ray along with Stefano Langone and Pia Toscano. McDonald even recorded a song, "Now That I've Found You", with his wife Nikki Reed, which debuted on Ryan Seacrest's radio show on November 15, 2011. The couple released their first EP together, The Best Part, on October 29, 2012.

In September 2012, McDonald appeared in a Parenthood episode as a musician who used Crosby and Adam's recording space, The Luncheonette, and sang a new song, "Counting Stars."

McDonald and his wife, Nikki Reed, starred in Hanson's 2013 music video for "Get the Girl Back". The video was filmed in January 2013, and released in April 2013. Other famous faces in the video include Kat Dennings, Drake Bell, Drew Seeley, Amy Paffrath, and Alex Beh. On July 8, 2014, McDonald and Reed released an album titled I'm Not Falling.

In 2014, McDonald launched his solo career by releasing a single, "Bright Lights," on October 7, 2014, and a video released on November 3, 2014.

== Personal life ==
McDonald met actress Nikki Reed on the red carpet at the premiere of Red Riding Hood in March 2011. The moment they met was broadcast on an American Idol episode as part of a segment that showed McDonald and his fellow contestants attending the premiere. McDonald and Reed soon began dating and moved in together shortly after that. Their engagement was confirmed in June 2011, and they married on October 16, 2011, in Malibu, California. In March 2014, McDonald and Reed announced that they had separated. Reed filed for divorce on May 16, 2014, citing irreconcilable differences. The divorce was finalized in January 2015.

McDonald married Nashville country music artist Leah Blevins in 2020.

== Discography ==
=== Albums ===
As part of Hightide Blues

- 2007: Hightide Blues (EP)
  - Track list of Hightide Blues EP:
1. "I Can't" (4:09)
2. "4:15" (3:24)
3. "Will She" (3:02)
4. "Tired of Leavin'" (5:16)
5. "Jennifer" (4:54)
- 2008: Love Come Easy
  - Track list of Love Come Easy album:
1. "Katie, Can You Hear Me?" (3:10)
2. "Far from Home" (4:59)
3. "Dreamin' Alone" (3:52)
4. "Let It Roll" (3:13)
5. "Giving Up On You" (3:57)
6. "Merle's Last Stand" (2:05)
7. "Black Crows" (4:30)
8. "Dancing with the Angels (Meg's Song)" (4:29)

As part of The Grand Magnolias

- 2010: The Grand Magnolias
  - Track list of The Grand Magnolias album:
1. "Sing Out" (4:07)
2. "American Dreams" (3:46)
3. "Fly Me to the Moon" (3:27)
4. "I Can't Remember" (3:14)
5. "No More One More Nights" (3:51)
6. "Heartbreak" (5:01)
7. "Four Fifteen" (5:06)
8. "Whoa" (4:22)
9. "Top of the World" (3:11)
10. "Please Believe Me" (4:08)

Paul McDonald and Nikki Reed

- 2012: The Best Part-EP
  - Track list of The Best Part-EP Album:
1. "Bouquet of Lies (Ghost in Apt. 8)"
2. "All I'm Asking"
3. "The Best Part"
4. "Now That I've Found You (Version 2)"
5. "Goodbye"
- 2014: I'm Not Falling

Year	Album details	Peak	Certifications (sales threshold)
Year	Album details	US Heat	Certifications (sales threshold)
2011	The Grand Magnolias: Released: 2011; Label: Independent; Format: CD, self released	12	US: 9,000
"—" denotes releases that did not chart

=== Extended plays ===
Title	Details	Sales
The Best Part (feat. Nikki Reed)	Released: October 29, 2012; Label: Enzo and Ira Records; Formats: Digital downloads	US: 3,000

Appearances

- "All I've Ever Needed" (with Nikki Reed) — The Twilight Saga: Breaking Dawn – Part 2 soundtrack (2012)
