= Thia Megia =

Singer

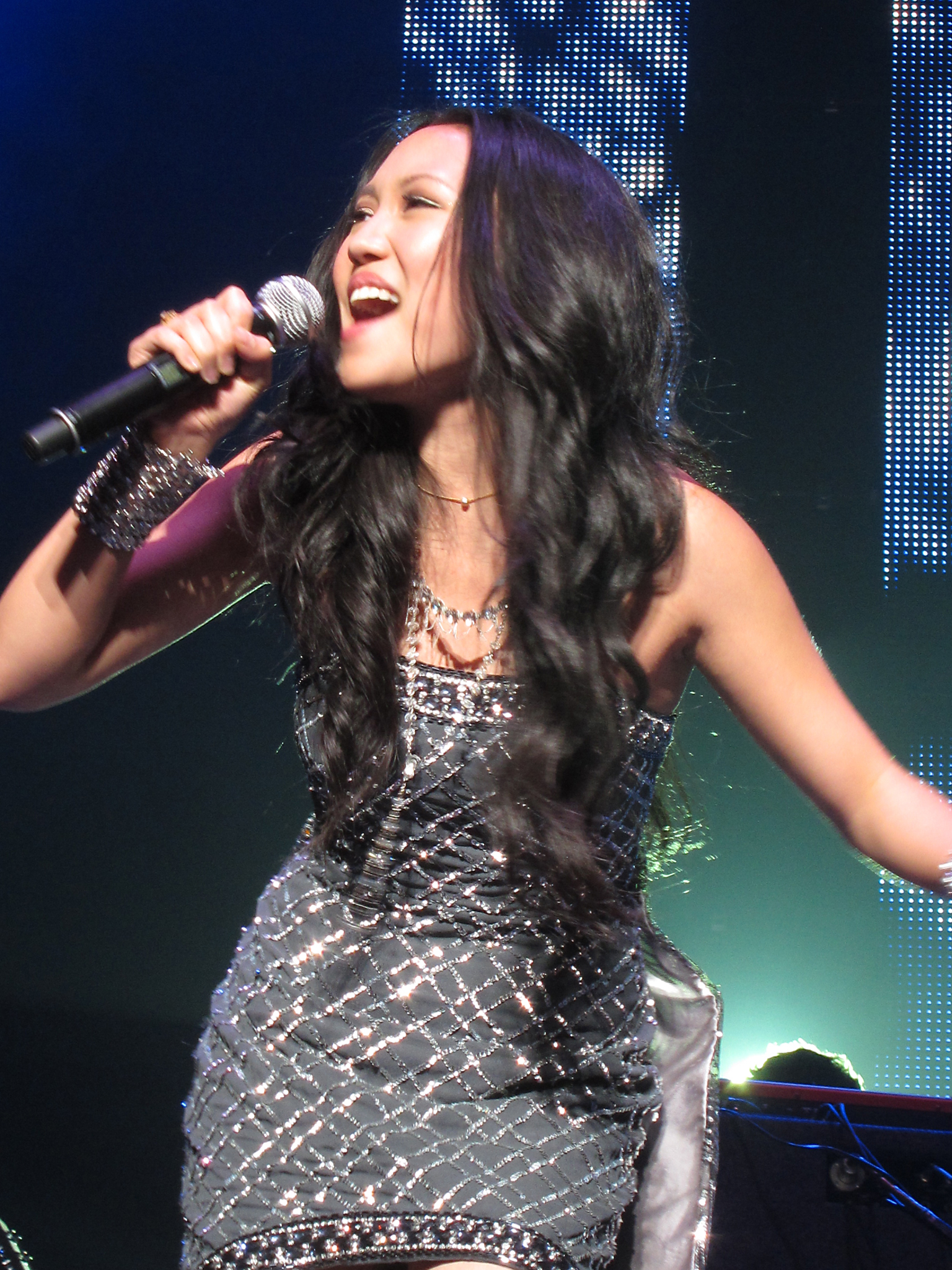
- Megia performing in 2011

Background information
- Born: Thialorei Lising Megia; January 30, 1995 (age 31); Hayward, California
- Origin: Mountain House, California, United States
- Genres: Pop
- Occupations: Singer, actress
- Instruments: Vocals, guitar, piano
- Years active: 2007–present

Thialorei Lising Megia (born January 30, 1995) is an American singer and television actress. She is known for being a contestant on the tenth season of American Idol and for starring as Haley Chen on Days of Our Lives.

== Early life ==
Megia was born in Hayward, California, to Cynthia and Loreto Megia. Her parents, originally from Angeles City, Philippines, emigrated to the United States in 1968 and changed their name from Mejia to Megia. She attended Eden Gardens Elementary School in Hayward through the sixth grade, but was cyber-schooled online at California Virtual Academy, when the family moved to Mountain House, California.

She has won singing competitions in San Jose and Saratoga and has sung the national anthem at San Jose Giants, Stanford football and San Francisco 49ers games. She also appeared on the TV show Showtime at the Apollo as the Kid Star of Tomorrow in 2008 when she was 13.

Prior to Idol, however, Megia was best known for her appearance on the fourth season of America's Got Talent in 2009. She made it to the quarterfinals, but was cut in the Top 40 round. That same year, she was invited to sing at the David Foster and Friends concert in California. She is the first America's Got Talent contestant to advance to voting rounds on American Idol.

Megia was one of the singers in Lisa Lavie's February 20, 2010, collaboration video "We Are the World 25 for Haiti (YouTube Edition)" for charity relief for victims of the January 12, 2010 Haiti earthquake, along with Jessica Sanchez. The video's participants were collectively recognized as "Persons of the Week" on ABC World News with Diane Sawyer on Friday, March 19, 2010.

She had her debut concert at Le Petit Trianon Theatre in San Jose, California, on March 27, 2010.

== Career ==
=== American Idol ===
Megia auditioned for the tenth season of American Idol in Milwaukee, Wisconsin with the song "Chasing Pavements" by Adele.

On March 31, 2011, Megia and Naima Adedapo were eliminated from American Idol.

As of season 10, Megia is the youngest finalist to ever appear on Idol after they changed the minimum age limit to 15 years.

=== Performances/results ===
| Episode | Theme | Song choice | Original artist | Order # | Result |
|---|---|---|---|---|---|
| Audition | Auditioner's Choice | "Chasing Pavements" | Adele | N/A | Advanced |
| Hollywood Round, Part 1 | First Solo | "Summertime" | Abbie Mitchell | N/A | Advanced |
| Hollywood Round, Part 2 | Group Performance | Unaired | Unaired | N/A | Advanced |
| Hollywood Round, Part 3 | Second Solo | "What a Wonderful World" | Louis Armstrong | N/A | Advanced |
| Las Vegas Round | Songs of The Beatles Group Performance | "Here Comes the Sun" with Melinda Ademi | The Beatles | N/A | Advanced |
| Hollywood Round Final | Final Solo to determine Top 24 | "You Raise Me Up" | Secret Garden | N/A | Advanced |
| Top 24 (12 Females) | Personal Choice | "Out Here on My Own" | Irene Cara | 10 | Advanced |
| Top 13 | Your Personal Idol | "Smile" | Charlie Chaplin | 9 | Safe |
| Top 12 | Year You Were Born | "Colors of the Wind" | Vanessa Williams | 3 | Safe |
| Top 11 | Motown | "(Love Is Like a) Heat Wave" | Martha and the Vandellas | 2 | Bottom 3^{1} |
| Top 11^{2} | Elton John | "Daniel" | Elton John | 8 | Eliminated |

- ^Note 1 Megia was saved first from elimination.
- ^Note 2 Due to the judges using their one save to save Casey Abrams, the Top 11 remained intact for another week.

=== Post Idol ===
Megia and the rest of the top 11 took part in the American Idols Live! Tour 2011, which began in West Valley City, Utah, on July 6, 2011, and ended in Manila, Philippines on September 20, 2011. Both the eliminated contestants, Naima Adedapo and Thia Megia, appeared and performed on The Tonight Show with Jay Leno and Live with Regis and Kelly. Megia recently had a welcome home celebration at the West Valley Mall in Tracy, California, and Central Park in Mountain House, California. On November 12, 2011, Megia was invited to perform the U.S. National Anthem for the opening ceremony of the World Boxing Organization Welterweight Championship match between Manny Pacquiao and Juan Manuel Marquez. Her rendition of the song "One Day" was marked as a Bonus Track for the "Quest for Zhu: Music from the Motion Picture" album which was released on November 21, 2011. She appeared on Philippine shows named Eat Bulaga and Manny Many Prizes with Pia Toscano, Stefano Langone and Scotty McCreery.

On April 19, 2012, Megia began an Asian concert tour in which she headlined concerts in Manila, Taipei, Bali, Jakarta, and Kuala Lumpur. In May and June 2012, Megia performed in The Finalists Live! at the Andy Williams Moon River Theatre in Branson, Missouri with Lee Dewyze, Elliott Yamin, Kimberly Caldwell, and Blake Lewis.

Published on April 13, 2017, Megia was the guest singer for Postmodern Jukebox's cover of the Gorillaz's "Feel Good Inc." Later in 2017, Megia was one of four featured singers (along with Sara Niemietz, Rayvon Owen and Blake Lewis) in Postmodern Jukebox's cover of Journey's "Don't Stop Believin'."

=== Acting ===
Megia began her acting career in 2017, when she guest starred in two episodes of Totally Funny. In the same year she appeared in two short films "Eye of Enmity" and "Yellow Rose", followed by guest starring in two series, Pop Music High as Ava and Tails of the Blue as Princess Cordelia. In 2018, she guest-starred in A.S.S (A Scary Sleepover) as Kristen and in the same year, she joined the cast of Days of Our Lives as a character named Haley Chen. She debuted on December 19, 2018.

== Discography ==
=== Singles ===
| Year | Title | Album |
|---|---|---|
| 2011 | "One Day" | Quest for Zhu: Music from the Motion Picture |
| 2012 | "We'll Be There" | Disney Fairies: Faith, Trust And Pixie Dust |

== Filmography ==
Film roles
| Year | Title | Role | Notes |
|---|---|---|---|
| 2017 | Eye of Enmity | Kayla | Short film |
| 2017 | Yellow Rose | Rose | Short film |

Television roles
| Year | Title | Role | Notes |
|---|---|---|---|
| 2011 | American Idol | Herself | Contestant; 12 episodes |
| 2017 | Totally Funny | Savannah Saffron / Hannah / Herself | Episode: "Episode #1.4" Episode: "Episode dated 10 October 2017" |
| 2017 | Pop Music High | Ava | Three episodes |
| 2017 | Tails of the Blue | Princess Cordelia | Four episodes |
| 2018 | A.S.S. (A Scary Sleepover) | Kristen | Three episodes |
| 2018–2019, 2020 | Days of Our Lives | Haley Chen | Regular role |
| 2019 | Coop & Cami Ask the World | Min | Episode: "Would You Rather Get a Selfie?" |

== Nominations ==
| Year | Award | Category | Work | Result | Ref. |
|---|---|---|---|---|---|
| 2020 | 47th Daytime Emmy Awards | Outstanding Younger Performer in a Drama Series | Days of Our Lives | Nominated | |
