= Pia Toscano =

American singer (born 1988)

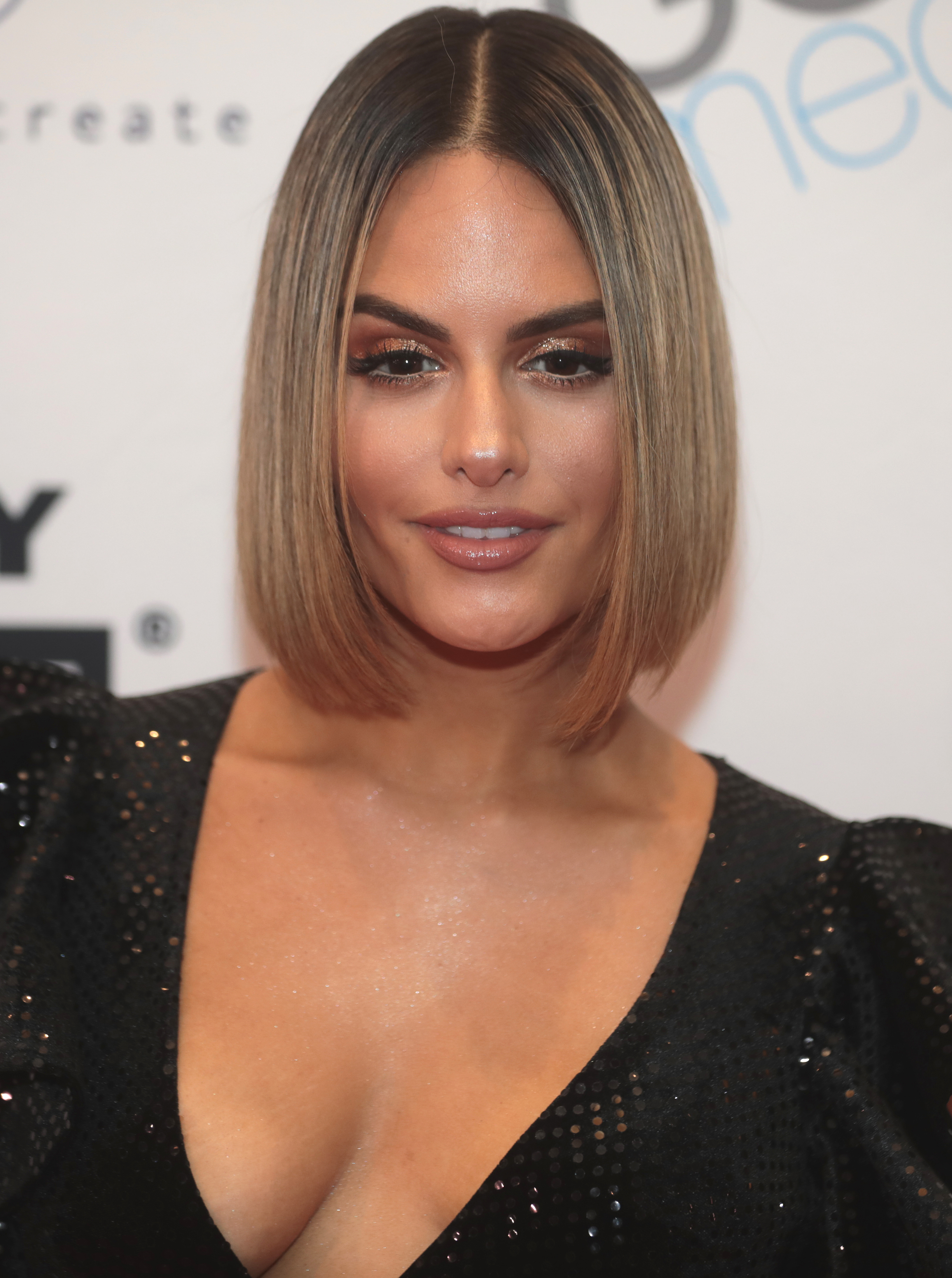
- Toscano in 2019

Background information
- Born: October 14, 1988 (age 38); New York City, New York, U.S.
- Origin: Queens, New York, U.S.
- Genre: Pop
- Occupation: Singer
- Instrument: Vocals
- Years active: 2011–present
- Labels: 19 Recordings/Interscope; KimPia Entertainment; Poets Road Records
- Website: piatoscanomusic.com

Pia Toscano (born October 14, 1988) is an American singer. Toscano placed ninth on the tenth season of American Idol. In 2016, she released the EP Belong. Her debut album I'm Good was released on October 14, 2022.

== Early life ==
Toscano was born in New York City on October 14, 1988, to Jane and Pat Toscano, and grew up in Howard Beach, Queens. Her father worked as a corporate executive. She is of Italian descent. She began performing in talent shows when she was four and, by the time she was nine, had performed in a local church production of Jesus Christ Superstar. Toscano was the official The Star-Spangled Banner singer at her middle school, P.S./M.S. 207, and performed at every event including graduation. She attended LaGuardia High School of the Performing Arts in New York City and graduated in 2006. Fellow Idol contestant Karen Rodriguez also attended this school.

She performed "The Star-Spangled Banner" and "God Bless America" for the Brooklyn Cyclones, the Mets' minor league team, several times a year for three years. In addition, Toscano was the winner of the New York Mets annual "Anthem Search" competition in 2008 and was selected to sing "The Star-Spangled Banner" at a July 2008 game. Toscano has also opened for the Barenaked Ladies and performed with Josh Groban at Madison Square Garden.

Prior to Idol, Toscano worked as a make-up artist and as a wedding singer in a band called "Current Affair". She cites her musical influences as Mariah Carey, Whitney Houston, Celine Dion, Etta James, and Luther Vandross.

== American Idol ==
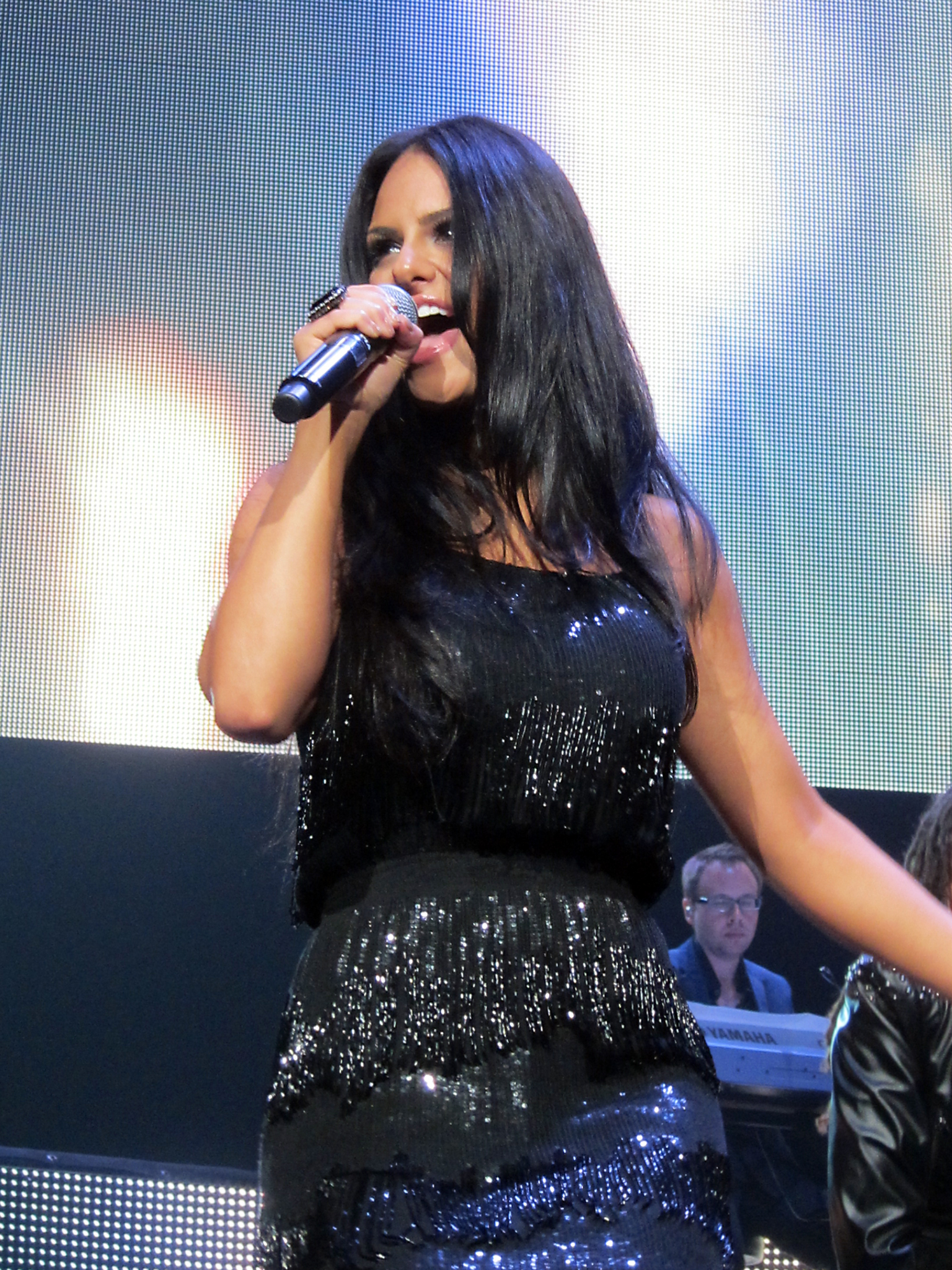
Toscano performing on July 13, 2011

Toscano auditioned for Idol four times before. She made it through to Hollywood in season 6, but got cut during the first day of Hollywood. In 2010, she auditioned for the tenth season of American Idol in East Rutherford, New Jersey, and was put through to Hollywood, this time making it through to the Top 24. Toscano was eliminated from the competition on April 7, 2011, finishing in ninth place.

She was considered a frontrunner in the competition, and her elimination shocked judges Randy Jackson, Jennifer Lopez, and Steven Tyler, all three of whom were visibly and vocally upset. Some viewers and media outlets described Toscano's departure as one of the most shocking eliminations in American Idol history. After Idol, Jennifer Lopez and David Foster helped guide her career.

=== Performances/results ===
Episode	Theme	Song choice	Original artist	Order #	Result
Audition	Auditioner's Choice	"Until You Come Back to Me (That's What I'm Gonna Do)"	Aretha Franklin	N/A	Advanced
Hollywood	First Solo	Not aired	N/A	N/A	Advanced
Hollywood	Group Performance	"Grenade"	Bruno Mars	N/A	Advanced
Hollywood	Second Solo	Not aired	N/A	N/A	Advanced
Las Vegas Round	Songs of The Beatles Group Performance	"Can't Buy Me Love"	The Beatles	N/A	Advanced
Hollywood Round Final	Final Solo	"Doesn't Mean Anything"	Alicia Keys	N/A	Advanced
Top 24 (12 Females)	Personal Choice	"I'll Stand by You"	The Pretenders	12	Advanced
Top 13	Your Personal Idol	"All by Myself"	Eric Carmen	5	Safe
Top 12	Year You Were Born	"Where Do Broken Hearts Go"	Whitney Houston	7	Safe
Top 11	Motown	"All in Love Is Fair"	Stevie Wonder	8	Safe
Top 11^{1}	Elton John	"Don't Let the Sun Go Down on Me"	Elton John	4	Safe
Top 9	Rock & Roll Hall of Fame	"River Deep – Mountain High"	Ike & Tina Turner	7	Eliminated

- ^Note 1 Due to the judges using their one save on Casey Abrams, the Top 11 remained intact for another week.

== Career ==
Following her elimination, Toscano appeared on several talk shows. She performed on The Tonight Show with Jay Leno on April 8, Live with Regis and Kelly on April 11, Today on April 12, and The Ellen DeGeneres Show on April 14. She performed "I'll Stand by You" on the April 26, 2011 episode of Dancing with the Stars. On May 25, Toscano appeared on Rachael Ray along with Stefano Langone and Paul McDonald. Toscano performed "The Star-Spangled Banner" and "I'll Stand by You" at the Memorial Day Concert in Washington, D.C., on May 29, 2011.

The following summer, Toscano toured with the American Idols Live! Tour 2011, which began in West Valley City, Utah on July 6, 2011, and ended in Manila, Philippines on September 20, 2011.

On July 5, 2011, it was announced that Toscano had officially signed with Interscope Records. Her debut single titled "This Time" premiered July 11 and was released digitally on July 13. Toscano performed the single on So You Think You Can Dance on August 4, Good Morning America on August 12, and Live with Regis and Kelly on August 16. Toscano had worked with Rock Mafia on two songs titled "Counterfeit" and "Dreamgirl" for her then-upcoming album.

On September 11, 2011, Toscano performed "God Bless America" at the New York Mets and Chicago Cubs game. In addition, Toscano performed "I'll Stand by You" and "This Time" at the Columbus Day parade in New York City. Toscano performed "The Star-Spangled Banner" at the NASCAR Sprint Cup Series Championship in Miami, Florida on November 20, 2011.

Toscano recorded a duet of "The Christmas Song" with Il Volo for their EP Christmas Favorites, which was released on November 21, 2011. On November 27, 2011, Toscano appeared on Disney Channel's So Random!, where she performed her single "This Time". Toscano also co-wrote the song "Wrecking Ball" with Steven Miller for Aubrey O'Day, which was released on April 23, 2012.

She performed "The Star-Spangled Banner" before every Los Angeles Kings home game in the 2012 Stanley Cup playoffs, in the 2013 Stanley Cup playoffs, the first two rounds of the 2014 Stanley Cup playoffs, game 5 of the 2014 Stanley Cup Final, before the 2014–15 season opener on October 8, 2014, and before Game 2 of the first round of the 2016 Stanley Cup Playoffs.

On August 7, 2012, it was announced that Toscano met with the showrunners of Glee; however, the role she was auditioning for was re-written at the last minute, but the showrunners were hopeful that she would come back for a different role.

On September 4, 2012, Toscano parted ways with Interscope Records and 19 Management and her debut album that she recorded would not be released. Toscano made her film debut in Grace Unplugged in 2013.

On May 30, 2014, Toscano began a six-date summer tour as a background singer for Jennifer Lopez, including appearances on Good Morning America and The Tonight Show Starring Jimmy Fallon.

In 2014, Toscano started a collaborative project 7East with singer-songwriter Jared Lee. A single, "I Don't Believe It", was released on October 7, 2014, with a video released on October 28.

In 2015, her collaboration with DJ/producer Jenaux, "Renegades", was released on Enhanced Music.

Toscano released two singles, "Pyro" and "You'll Be King", on April 7, 2016.

In 2017, Toscano joined David Foster's Hitman Tour as a regular featured performer. In 2018, Toscano was a cast member on the music reality Westside. In November 2018, Toscano began touring with Andrea Bocelli as a guest performer.

On May 30, 2022, she performed "The Star-Spangled Banner" and "God Bless America" at the 33rd Annual Memorial Day Concert. Her debut album I'm Good was released on October 14, 2022.

In February 2024, she performed "All by Myself", "Vivo per lei" and "Canto della terra" with Andrea Bocelli at the Viña del Mar Song Festival.

In July 2024, she performed her first two concerts as a soloist in Chile. She performed at the Viña del Mar Theater on July 16 and at Movistar Arena on July 18, with guest artists such as Andrés de León and Nico Ruiz.

On November 1, 2025, she sang "The Star Spangled Banner" at Game 7 of the 2025 World Series between the Toronto Blue Jays and the Los Angeles Dodgers.

== Discography ==
=== Studio albums ===
Title	Album details
I'm Good	Released: October 14, 2022; Label: Poets Road Records; Format: CD, digital download, streaming

=== Extended plays ===
Title	EP details
Belong	Released: December 16, 2016; Label: KimPia Entertainment; Format: Digital download, streaming
Christmas with You	Released: December 9, 2021; Label: Poets Road Records; Format: Digital download, streaming

=== Singles ===
Lead artist

Year	Single	Peak positions		Album
Year	Single	US Bub.	US Heat.	Album
2011	"This Time"	4	16	non-album single
2014	"I Don’t Believe It" (with Jared Lee; credited as 7EAST)	–	–	non-album single
2016	"Pyro"	—	—	Belong
2016	"You'll Be King"	—	—	Belong
2017	"Say You Won't Let Go" (James Arthur cover)	–	–	non-album single
2018	"In My Blood" (Shawn Mendes cover)	–	–	non-album single
2019	"Delicate" (Taylor Swift cover)	–	–	non-album single
2021	"Brave (from The Great Artist)" (with Jon Altham and Matthew Postlethwaite)	–	–	I'm Good
2022	"I'm Good"	—	—	I'm Good
2022	"Walk Through the Fire"	—	—	I'm Good
2023	"Labor of Love"	—	—	non-album single
"—" denotes a recording that did not chart or was not released in that territory.

Featured artist

Year	Single	Album
2015	"Renegades" (Jenaux featuring Pia Toscano)	non-album single
2016	"Siren" (Vicetone featuring Pia Toscano)	Aurora
2017	"Love Me Again" (Taylor Olson featuring Pia Toscano)	non-album single
2020	"My Funny Valentine" (Sean Patrick Murray featuring Pia Toscano)	non-album single
2021	"#Wicked4Whitney" (Jared Jenkins and Michael Korte featuring Avery Wilson, Pia Toscano, George Lovett, Candice Boyd, Brooke Simpson and Sheléa)	non-album single

=== Music videos ===
Year	Video	Director
2011	"This Time"	Marc Klasfeld
2015	"Renegades"	Robert Styles
2016	"Siren" (Vicetone ft. Pia Toscano)	
2016	"You'll Be King"	Robert Styles
2020	"Never Alone" (Emmanuel Kelly ft. Pia Toscano) (Paul Oakenfold & Varun Remix)	Henry Finn
