= Naima Adedapo =

American singer and dancer

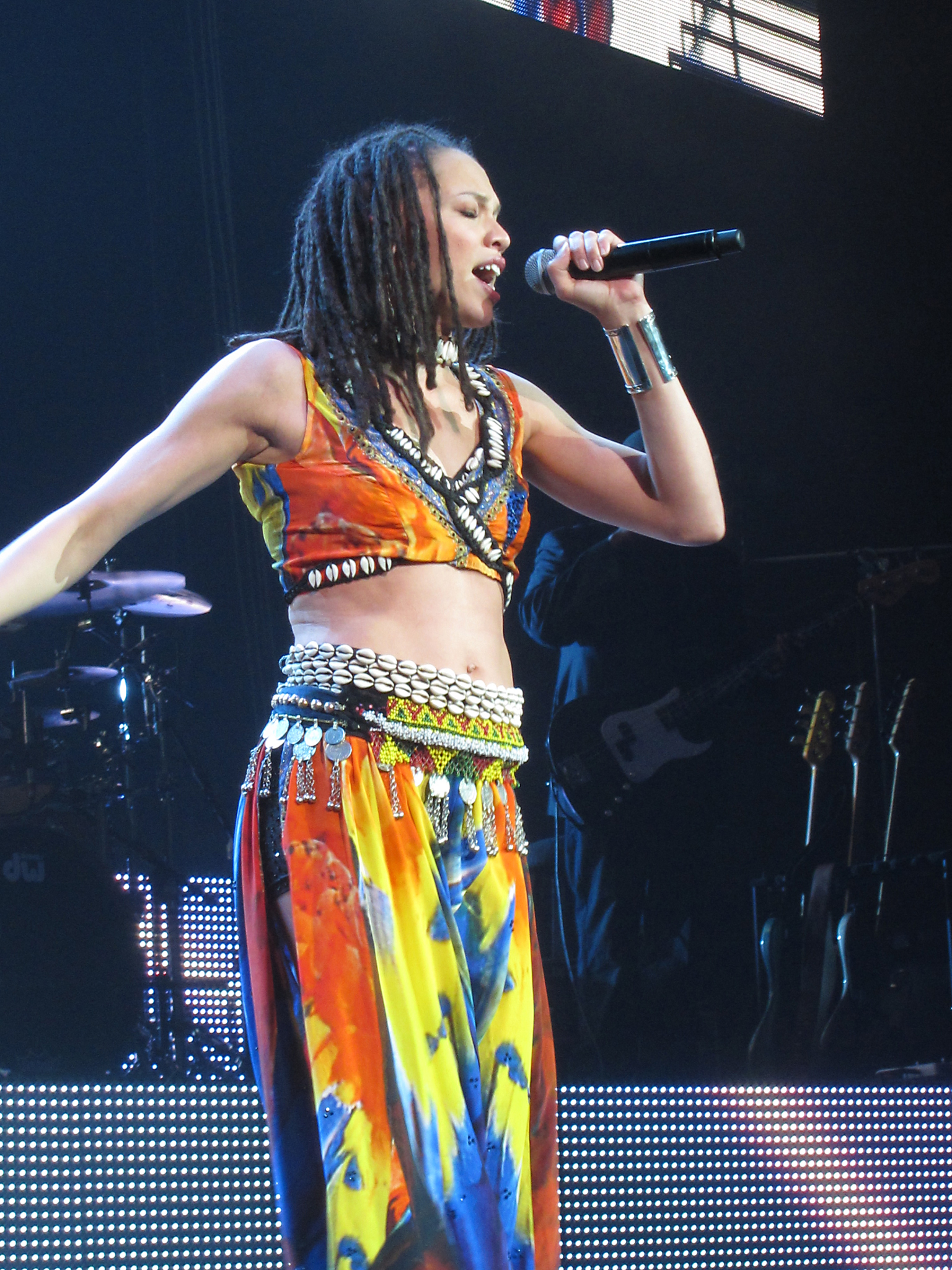

Background information
- Born: October 5, 1984 (age 41); Maywood, Illinois
- Origin: Milwaukee, Wisconsin, U.S.
- Genres: Reggae; R&B
- Occupations: Singer; dancer
- Instrument: Vocals
- Years active: 2011–present
- Label: Peak

Naima Adedapo (born October 5, 1984) is an American singer and dancer from Milwaukee, Wisconsin. Adedapo placed in the top 11 on the tenth season of American Idol.

== Early life ==
Adedapo was born in Maywood, Illinois, and her family moved to Milwaukee, Wisconsin, when she was ten. Adedapo is the daughter of Milwaukee area jazz singer Adekola Adedapo. Adedapo graduated high school from St. Joan Antida. Her senior year, Adedapo placed first at the Wisconsin Forensic Coaches Association's State Tournament in Demonstration Speaking for her speech on African dance, with drumming accompaniment by her brother. She later majored in Dance at the University of Wisconsin-Milwaukee.

== American Idol ==
=== Overview ===
Adedapo auditioned for the tenth season of American Idol in Milwaukee, Wisconsin. She was not one of the five female vote-getters in the semi-final round to advance to the Top 13. She was one of the six selected to sing for a wild card. The judges chose three of the six, including Adedapo, to advance to the Top 13. On March 31, 2011, Adedapo and Thia Megia were eliminated from American Idol.

=== Performances/Results ===
Episode	Theme	Song choice	Original artist	Order #	Result
Audition	Auditioner's Choice	"For All We Know"	Hal Kemp	N/A	Advanced
Hollywood Round, Part 1	First Solo	Unaired	Unaired	N/A	Advanced
Hollywood Round, Part 2	Group Performance	"Get Ready"	The Temptations	N/A	Advanced
Hollywood Round, Part 3	Second Solo	Unaired	Unaired	N/A	Advanced
Las Vegas Round	Songs of The Beatles; Group Performance	"The Long and Winding Road"	The Beatles	N/A	Advanced
Hollywood Round Final	Final Solo	"Put Your Records On"	Corinne Bailey Rae	N/A	Advanced
Top 24 (12 Women)	Personal Choice	"Summertime"	Abbie Mitchell	2	Wild Card
Wild Card	Personal Choice	"For All We Know"	Hal Kemp	5	Selected
Top 13	Your Personal Idol	"Umbrella"	Rihanna	13	Safe
Top 12	Year You Were Born	"What's Love Got to Do with It"	Tina Turner	1	Bottom 3^{1}
Top 11	Motown	"Dancing in the Street"	Martha and the Vandellas	10	Safe
Top 11^{2}	Elton John	"I'm Still Standing"	Elton John	2	Eliminated

- ^Note 1 Adedapo was saved first from elimination.
- ^Note 2 Due to the judges using their one save to save Casey Abrams, the Top 11 remained intact for another week.

== Post-Idol ==
Adedapo and the rest of the top 11 performed in the 2011 American Idols LIVE! Tour, which began in West Valley City, Utah, on July 6, 2011, and ended in Manila, Philippines on September 20, 2011. Both the eliminated contestants, Naima and Thia Megia, appeared and performed on The Tonight Show with Jay Leno and Live with Regis and Kelly. Adedapo released a seven-song EP, Beautifully Made, which she co-wrote and co-produced, on November 20, 2015. Adedapo co-wrote and produced all of the EP's tracks. She later signed on as a songwriter with Given Music Publishing.

In 2012, Adedapo signed with Peak Records.

== Personal life ==
Adedapo is married with two daughters and three stepdaughters. She was formerly a maintenance worker at Henry Maier Festival Park (home of Summerfest) in Milwaukee.
