= This Time (Pia Toscano song) =

Single by Pia Toscano
- Released: July 11, 2011
- Recorded: 2011
- Genre: Pop
- Length: 3:09
- Label: Interscope
- Songwriters: Brian Kennedy; Esther Dean; Brett James; Dante Jones
- Producers: Kennedy; Dean

Pia Toscano singles chronology
"This Time" (2011)	"Pyro" (2016)

"This Time" is the debut single by American singer and American Idol season 10 finalist Pia Toscano. It was her only release under Interscope before she announced she had parted ways on September 4, 2012.

== Promotion ==
The song was first performed on the American Idol tour in Salt Lake City, Utah on July 5, 2011. It was premiered on On Air with Ryan Seacrest on July 11, 2011 and digitally released on July 13, 2011. The following day it was announced via Twitter that Toscano is filming a music video for the song. She performed the song the August 4, 2011 episode of So You Think You Can Dance. The music video for the song premiered on August 9.

== Music video ==
The music video for the song premiered on August 9, 2011 on Vevo and as a free download on the iTunes Store. It features Toscano singing in a car, a field, the beach, and the city.

== Critical reception ==
The song has received positive to mixed reviews by critics. Joseph Brannigan Lynch of Entertainment Weekly says "it's the kind of song we can expect to hear Rachel Berry singing the next time Finn screws up: sad, relatable, and a touch awe-inspiring. Chris Willman of Los Angeles Times gave the song a more negative review, saying Pia "sings the hell out of it, of course"; he calls the song itself "a compendium of comeback cliches that almost reads like a parody of the whole I-will-survive genre." Jillian Mapes and Sarah Maloy of Billboard say "Lyrically, Toscano finds her strength -- from what sounds to be an emotionally or even physically abusive relationship -- on the midtempo pop ballad."

== Commercial performance ==
In its debut week, the single sold 19,000 copies. After her performance on So You Think You Can Dance, sales went up by 21,000, bringing the total as of to 51,000. The number of digital sales as of August 16, 2011 is 65,000.

== Charts ==
Chart performance for "This Time"
Chart (2011)	Peak position
US Bubbling Under Hot 100 (Billboard)	4
US Heatseekers Songs (Billboard)	16

== Release history ==
Country	Date	Format	Label
United States	July 11, 2011	Radio airplay	Interscope
United States	July 13, 2011	Digital download	Interscope
Australia	July 15, 2011	Digital download	Interscope
