= Robbie Rosen =

Television show contestant (born 1993)

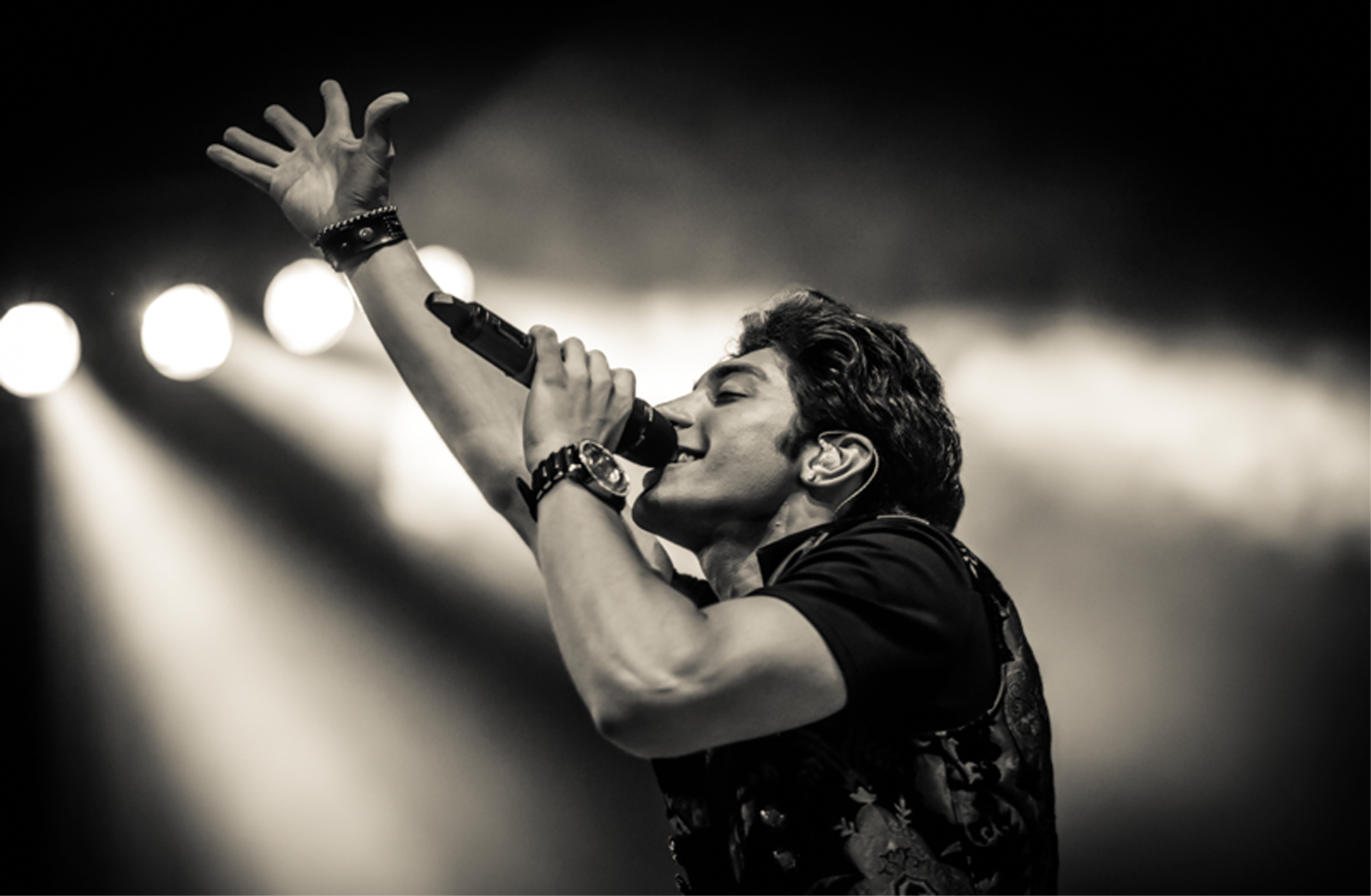
- Rosen opening for Shawn Mendes at The Paramount
- Born: Robert Alexander Rosen; December 27, 1993 (age 31); Long Island, New York, U.S.
- Occupations: Singer; songwriter; musician; record producer
- Years active: 2011–present
- Musical career
- Genres: EDM; Pop
- Instruments: Vocals; piano
- Labels: Green & Bloom; BMG

Robert Alexander Rosen (born December 27, 1993), known professionally as Robbie Rosen, is an American EDM vocalist and former American Idol contestant who rose to prominence as one of the Top 16 finalists on the 10th season of American Idol. In 2015, Rosen's original composition “Blue and Gold” was selected as the new official university alma mater for Hofstra University and replaced the previous alma mater “The Netherlands” which was written by Dr. Hans J. Gottlieb in 1937.

== Early life and education ==
Rosen was born on Long Island, New York, to Matt and Loren Rosen. His father was a school social worker and his mother was a therapist. Rosen attended Sanford H. Calhoun High School in Merrick, New York, and was an All-State vocal jazz singer as well as an All-County baseball player.

During Rosen's junior year of high school, he auditioned for American Idol in East Rutherford, New Jersey, and advanced to Hollywood Week. Rosen would advance past the Las Vegas round and would make it to the Top 16 wildcard round. After his time on Idol, Rosen attended Hofstra University and graduated summa cum laude with a BS in Jazz & Commercial Music in 2016.

== Post-Idol ==
In 2015, Rosen composed the original song “Blue and Gold” during his junior year at Hofstra University. The song was selected as the new official alma mater for the university by a committee of six Hofstra University administrators and music professors. This alma mater would be Hofstra's first new alma mater in over 75 years.

In June 2015, Rosen opened for Shawn Mendes during a sold-out show at The Paramount in Huntington, New York. The show was organized by WBLI.

In 2019, Rosen signed a publishing deal with BMG. He has been featured on over 250 EDM songs as a vocalist and has accumulated over 100 million streams. These songs include "Blue Love" with music producer EMDI and "Count You In" with HARBER.
