= Lauren Alaina discography =

- Studio albums: 3
- EPs: 3
- Singles: 13
- Music videos: 8
- Promotional singles: 6

American singer and songwriter Lauren Alaina has released three studio albums, three extended plays, ten singles plus three as a featured artist, and eight music videos. Alaina rose to prominence in 2011 as the runner-up on the tenth season of American Idol. Her debut studio album, Wildflower, released in the fall of 2011, debuted in the top five of the Billboard 200. In 2017, Alaina became the only female to top both the Billboard Country Airplay chart (with her own single "Road Less Traveled" from her second studio album of the same name) and Hot Country Songs chart (as featured on Kane Brown's "What Ifs") in 2017. She achieved a further two number ones as a featured vocalist on Hardy and Devin Dawson's "One Beer" (in 2020), and Dustin Lynch's "Thinking 'Bout You" (in 2021). Her third album, Sitting Pretty on Top of the World, was also released in 2021.

== Albums ==
=== Studio albums ===
Title	Details	Peak chart positions				Sales
Title	Details	US	US Country	CAN	UK Country	Sales
Wildflower	Release date: October 11, 2011; Label: Interscope/Mercury Nashville/19; Formats: CD, digital download	5	2	22	—	US: 303,000
Road Less Traveled	Release date: January 27, 2017; Label: Interscope/Mercury Nashville/19; Formats: CD, digital download	31	3	—	7	US: 34,500
Sitting Pretty on Top of the World	Release date: September 3, 2021; Label: Mercury Nashville/19; Formats: CD, digital download	173	21	—	—	
Stages	Release date: August 28, 2026; Label: Big Loud; Formats: CD, digital download	—	—	—	—	
"—" denotes a recording that failed to chart.

=== Compilation albums ===
Title	Details	Peak chart positions			Sales
Title	Details	US	US Country	US Indie	Sales
American Idol Season 10: Lauren Alaina	Release date: May 24, 2011; Label: 19; Formats: Digital download	42	9	6	US: 17,000

== Extended plays ==
Title	Details	Peak chart positions			Sales
Title	Details	US	US Country	AUS Country	Sales
American Idol Season 10 Highlights: Lauren Alaina	Release date: June 28, 2011; Label: 19/Interscope/Mercury Nashville; Format: CD, digital download	24	6	—	US: 85,000
Lauren Alaina	Release date: October 2, 2015; Label: 19/Interscope/Mercury Nashville; Format: CD, digital download	—	28	—	US: 1,600
Getting Good	Release date: March 6, 2020; Label: 19/Mercury Nashville; Format: CD, digital download	—	28	—	
Getting Over Him	Release date: September 4, 2020; Label: 19/Mercury Nashville; Format: CD, digital download	— (Note: Getting Over Him did not enter the Billboard 200, but peaked at number 41 on the Top Album Sales component chart.)	33	32	
Unlocked	Release date: June 9, 2023; Label: Big Loud; Format: CD, digital download	—	—	—	
"—" denotes a recording that did not chart.

== Singles ==
=== As lead artist ===
Year	Title	Peak chart positions					Sales	Certifications	Album
Year	Title	US	US Country Songs	US Country Airplay	CAN	CAN Country	Sales	Certifications	Album
2011	"Like My Mother Does"	20	36		50	48	US: 398,000	RIAA: Gold	Wildflower
2011	"Georgia Peaches"	—	28		—	—	US: 189,000		Wildflower
2012	"Eighteen Inches"	—	37	34	—	—	US: 39,000		Wildflower
2013	"Barefoot and Buckwild"	—	34	56	—	—	US: 28,000		Non-album single
2015	"Next Boyfriend"	—	39	43	—	—	US: 10,000		Road Less Traveled
2016	"Road Less Traveled"	67	8	1	—	3	US: 203,524	RIAA: Platinum	Road Less Traveled
2017	"Doin' Fine"	—	34	27	—	—		RIAA: Gold	Road Less Traveled
2018	"Ladies in the '90s"	—	49	40	—	—	US: 7,000		Getting Good
2019	"Getting Good"	— (Note: "Getting Good" did not enter the Hot 100, but peaked at number 21 on the Digital Song Sales component chart.)	33	29	—	—	US: 7,000	RIAA: Gold	Getting Good
2021	"Getting Over Him" (with Jon Pardi)	— (Note: "Getting Over Him" did not enter the Hot 100, but peaked at number 40 on the Digital Song Sales component chart.)	35	29	—	28			Sitting Pretty on Top of the World
2023	"Thicc as Thieves"	—	—	54	—	—			Unlocked
2025	"All My Exes" (featuring Chase Matthew)	47	14	1	—	35			Stages
"—" denotes a recording that did not chart

=== As featured artist ===
Year	Title	Peak chart positions					Sales	Certification	Album
Year	Title	US	US Country Songs	US Country Airplay	CAN	CAN Country	Sales	Certification	Album
2017	"What Ifs" (Kane Brown featuring Lauren Alaina)	26	1	1	45	3	US: 889,000	RIAA: Diamond; ARIA: 2× Platinum; MC: 6× Platinum; RMNZ: Platinum	Kane Brown
2020	"One Beer" (Hardy featuring Lauren Alaina and Devin Dawson)	33	4	1	36	1	US: 19,000	RIAA: 3× Platinum; MC: 3× Platinum	A Rock
2021	"Thinking 'Bout You" (Dustin Lynch featuring Lauren Alaina) (Note: Lauren Alaina is featured only on the album version of "Thinking 'Bout You"; the radio version features MacKenzie Porter. This song is credited on the charts as "Dustin Lynch featuring Lauren Alaina or MacKenzie Porter".)	30	2	1	46	2	US: 14,000	RIAA: 4× Platinum; MC: 2× Platinum; RMNZ: Gold	Tullahoma
"—" denotes a recording that did not chart

=== Promotional singles ===
Year	Title	Peak chart positions	Album
Year	Title	US Country Digital	Album
2013	"My Grown Up Christmas List"	—	Non-album single
2015	"History"	—	Lauren Alaina
2016	"O Holy Night"	—	Country Christmas Greatest Hits
2016	"Queen of Hearts"	—	Road Less Traveled
2017	"Same Day Different Bottle"	—	Road Less Traveled
2019	"The Other Side"	8	Getting Good
2020	"Run"	19	Getting Over Him
2020	"What Do You Think Of?" (with Lukas Graham)	4	Getting Over Him
2021	"If the World Was a Small Town"	—	Sitting Pretty on Top of the World
2021	"It Was Me"	—	Sitting Pretty on Top of the World
2022	"Dancin' in the Moonlight" (Chris Lane featuring Lauren Alaina)	—	Non-album single
2025	"Those Kind of Women"	—	Stages
2025	"Household"	—	Stages
2025	"Heaven Sent"	—	Stages
2026	"Little Things"	—	Stages
2026	"Raining Whiskey"	—	Stages
2026	"Better Off"	—	Stages
2026	"Never Been In Love" (with Kane Brown)	—	Stages
"—" denotes a recording that did not chart.

== Other charted songs ==
Year	Song	Peak chart positions			Sales	Album
Year	Song	US Bubbling	US Country Songs	US Country Digital	Sales	Album
2011	"Dirt Road Prayer"	18	—	20		Wildflower
2011	"The Middle"	—	—	49		Wildflower
2019	"Town Ain't Big Enough" (Chris Young featuring Lauren Alaina)	—	—	12		Famous Friends
2023	"Thicc as Thieves" (with Lainey Wilson)	—	—	10		Unlocked
2024	"Now or Never" (Corey Kent featuring Lauren Alaina)	—	50	—		Black Bandana
"—" denotes a recording that did not chart.

== Music videos ==
Year	Video	Director
2011	"Like My Mother Does"	Shaun Silva
2012	"Georgia Peaches"	David McClister
2016	"Next Boyfriend"	TK McKamy
2016	"Road Less Traveled"	Chris Hicky
2017	"What Ifs" (with Kane Brown)	P.R. Brown
2017	"Doin' Fine"	Carlos Ruiz
2019	"Ladies in the '90s"	Benjamin Skipworth
2019	"Getting Good"	Roman White
