= Kristen May =

American singer (born 1982)

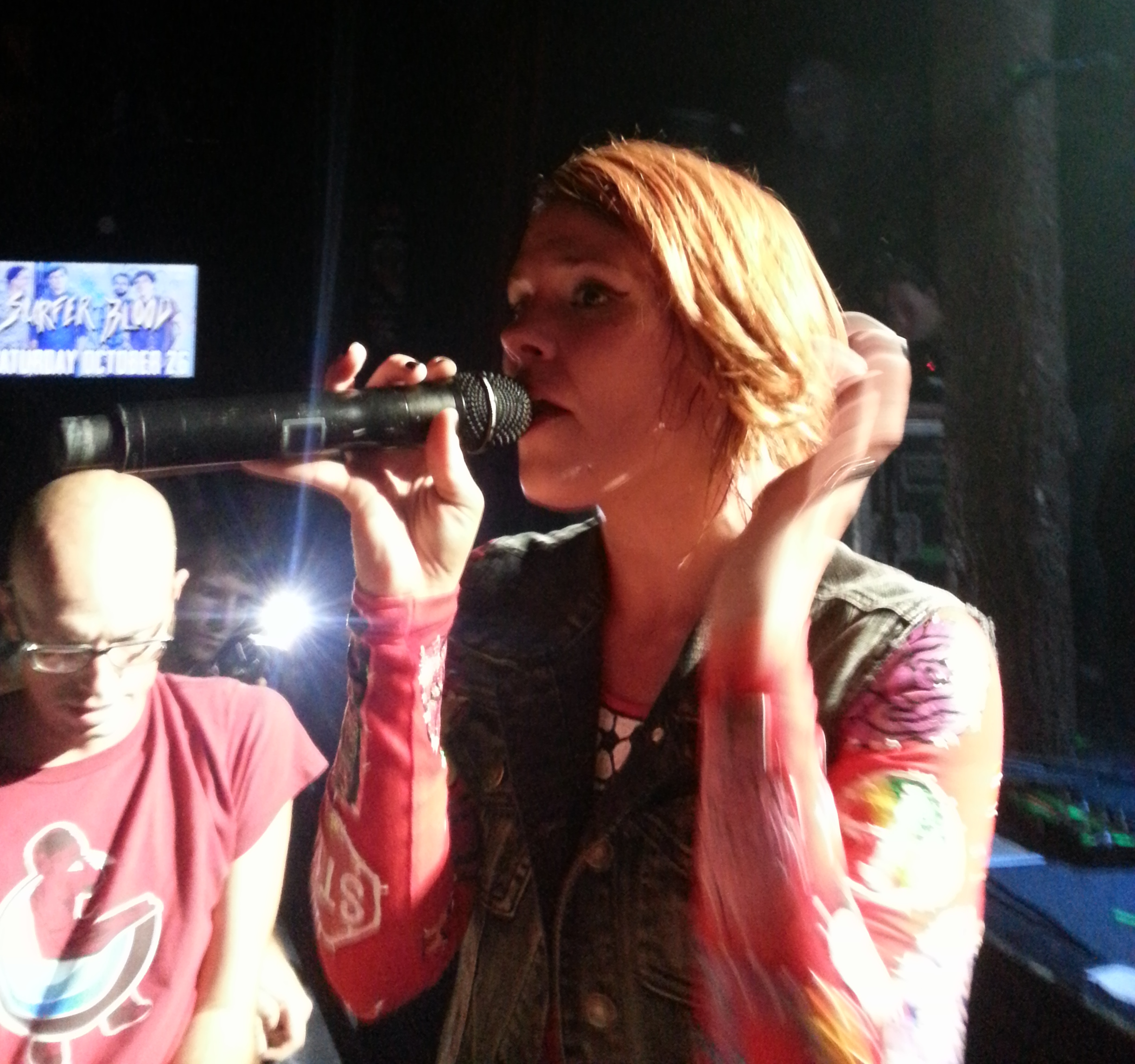
- May performing with Flyleaf in 2013

Background information
- Born: September 28, 1982 (age 43)
- Genres: Rock
- Occupations: Singer; musician
- Instruments: Vocals; guitar; keyboards
- Years active: 2004–present
- Formerly of: Flyleaf; Vedera

Kristen May (born September 28, 1982) is an American singer, best known as the former lead singer of the rock bands Vedera and Flyleaf. After Vedera disbanded in 2011, May replaced Lacey Sturm as the lead singer of Flyleaf. May released her solo album Conversations in 2015, before leaving Flyleaf in 2016.

== Background ==
May was raised in Blue Springs, Missouri. May was the lead singer of Vedera. Vedera's album Stages, reached No. 146 on the Billboard 200 and peaked at No. 2 on the Top Heatseekers chart. The single "Satisfy" charted at No. 36 on Billboard's Top 40 Adult Pop Songs. Vedera disbanded in 2011, two years after the release of Stages. May is married to her former Vedera bandmate, Brian Little.

=== Flyleaf ===
After Lacey Sturm departed Flyleaf, May was announced as the band's new lead singer on October 22, 2012. The band released an EP, Who We Are (EP), on July 9, 2013. that reached No. 35 on the Billboard Christian Albums chart. The band released a full-length album, Between the Stars, on September 16, 2014, that sold over 8,200 copies in the United States in its first week of release to land at No. 33 on the Billboard 200.

In November 2015, May released a solo album, Conversations, through a Pledge Music campaign. On December 28, 2015, May had her and Little's first child, a son named Graham. She announced her departure from Flyleaf on August 15, 2016, citing a growing desire to be with family and never feeling that Flyleaf was hers.

== Discography ==
=== Vedera ===
- This Broken City (2004)
- The Weight of an Empty Room (2005)
- Stages (2009)

=== Flyleaf ===
- Who We Are (EP) (2013)
- Between the Stars (2014)

=== Duet ===
- "Because He Lives" featuring Elle Mercurio (2015)

=== Solo ===
- Conversations (2015)
