= 53rd Academy of Country Music Awards =

US music awards ceremony in 2018

- Date: April 15, 2018
- Location: MGM Grand Garden Arena, Las Vegas, Nevada
- Hosted by: Reba McEntire

Highlights
- Most wins: Brothers Osborne; Miranda Lambert; Chris Stapleton; (2 each)
- Most nominations: Chris Stapleton (5)

Television/radio coverage
- Network: CBS

The 53rd Academy of Country Music Awards was held at the MGM Grand Garden Arena in Las Vegas, Nevada on April 15, 2018. Nominations were announced on March 1, 2018, with Chris Stapleton leading the nominations with five. Reba McEntire returned as host for the first time in six years, making it the fifteenth time she has hosted the show.

== Winners and Nominees ==
The winners are shown in bold.

Entertainer of the Year	Album of the Year
**Jason Aldean**; Garth Brooks; Luke Bryan; Chris Stapleton; Keith Urban	**From A Room: Volume 1** — **Chris Stapleton**; The Breaker — Little Big Town; California Sunrise — Jon Pardi; Happy Endings — Old Dominion; Life Changes — Thomas Rhett
Female Artist of the Year	Male Artist of the Year
**Miranda Lambert**; Kelsea Ballerini; Reba McEntire; Maren Morris; Carrie Underwood	**Chris Stapleton**; Jason Aldean; Thomas Rhett; Keith Urban; Chris Young
Group of the Year	Duo of the Year
**Old Dominion**; Lady Antebellum; LANCO; Little Big Town; Midland	**Brothers Osborne**; Dan + Shay; Florida Georgia Line; LOCASH; Tim McGraw and Faith Hill
Single of the Year	Song of the Year
**"Body Like a Back Road"** — **Sam Hunt**; "Better Man" — Little Big Town; "Broken Halos" — Chris Stapleton; "Drinkin' Problem" — Midland; "I'll Name the Dogs" — Blake Shelton	**"Tin Man"** — **Jack Ingram, Miranda Lambert and Jon Randall**; "Better Man" — Taylor Swift; "Body Like a Back Road" — Zach Crowell, Sam Hunt, Shane McAnally and Josh Osborne; "Female" — Ross Copperman, Nicolle Galyon and Shane McAnally; "Whiskey and You" — Lee Thomas Miller and Chris Stapleton
New Female Artist of the Year	New Male Artist of the Year
**Lauren Alaina**; Danielle Bradbery; Carly Pearce; RaeLynn	**Brett Young**; Kane Brown; Luke Combs; Devin Dawson; Russell Dickerson
New Vocal Duo or Group of the Year	Video of the Year
**Midland**; High Valley; LANCO; LOCASH; Runaway June	**"It Ain’t My Fault"** — **Brothers Osborne**; "Black" — Dierks Bentley; "Legends" — Kelsea Ballerin; "Marry Me" — Thomas Rhett; "We Should Be Friends" — Miranda Lambert
Vocal Event of the Year	Songwriter of the Year
**"The Fighter"** — **Keith Urban (feat. Carrie Underwood)**; "Craving You" — Thomas Rhett (feat. Maren Morris); "Dear Hate" — Maren Morris (feat. Vince Gill); "Funny (How Time Slips Away)" — Glen Campbell and Willie Nelson; "What If's" — Kane Brown (feat. Lauren Alaina)	**Rhett Akins**; Ashley Gorley; Hillary Lindsey; Shane McAnally; Josh Osborne

== Performances ==
Performer(s)	Song(s)
Kenny Chesney	"Get Along"
Maren Morris	"Rich"
Chris Young	"Losing Sleep"
Florida Georgia Line; Bebe Rexha	"Meant to Be"
Brett Young	"In Case You Didn't Know"
Alan Jackson; Jon Pardi	"Chattahoochee"
Lady Antebellum	"Heart Break"
Dierks Bentley	"Woman, Amen"
Blake Shelton	"I Lived It"
Kane Brown; Lauren Alaina	"What Ifs"
Keith Urban; Julia Michaels	"Coming Home"
Kelsea Ballerini	"I Hate Love Songs"
Jason Aldean	"You Make It Easy"
Miranda Lambert	"Keeper of the Flame"
Little Big Town	Tribute to Elton John "Rocket Man"
Toby Keith; Blake Shelton	"Should've Been a Cowboy"
Midland	"Drinkin' Problem"
Carrie Underwood	"Cry Pretty"
Dan + Shay	"Tequila"
Darius Rucker	"For the First Time"
Thomas Rhett	"Marry Me"
Luke Bryan	"Most People Are Good"
Lauren Alaina	"Doin' Fine"
Reba McEntire; Kelly Clarkson	"Does He Love You"
Chris Janson	"Redneck Life"

== Presenters ==
Presenters
Drew Brees
Cam
Sugarland
David Boreanaz
Ashton Kutcher
Sam Elliott
Lindsey Vonn
Nancy O'Dell
Dustin Lynch
Eve
Rebecca Romijn
Kiefer Sutherland

== See also ==
- Academy of Country Music Awards
