= Ladies in the '90s =

Single by Lauren Alaina

from the album Getting Good (EP)
- Released: October 15, 2018
- Genre: Country pop
- Length: 3:45
- Label: Mercury Nashville; 19
- Songwriters: Lauren Alaina; Amy Wadge; Jesse Frasure
- Producer: busbee

Lauren Alaina singles chronology
"Doin' Fine" (2017)	"Ladies in the '90s" (2018)	"Getting Good" (2019)

Music videos
- "Ladies in the '90s" on YouTube
- "Ladies in the '90s" (Lyric video) on YouTube

"Ladies in the '90s" is a song co-written and recorded by American country music singer Lauren Alaina. It was released on October 15, 2018, as the lead single from the EP Getting Good.

== Content ==
"Ladies in the '90s" was written by Lauren Alaina, Jesse Frasure, and Amy Wadge, and produced by busbee. Lyrically, the song pays homage to female artists and hit songs from the 1990s, a "decade of female superstars" that Alaina (who was born in 1994) looks back on fondly for its abundance of women on the radio that inspired her to become a singer. The song makes references to major country hits "Strawberry Wine", "Breathe", "Man! I Feel Like a Woman!", "Cowboy Take Me Away", and "Fancy", while also name-dropping songs from other genres, such as "...Baby One More Time", "Say My Name", "No Scrubs", "Genie in a Bottle", "Vogue", "Wannabe", and "You Oughta Know". In her live concerts, Alaina has been known to mash-up the song with Whitney Houston's "I Wanna Dance with Somebody (Who Loves Me)".

== Music video ==
The music video for "Ladies in the '90s" premiered on May 29, 2019, and features Alaina acting as a "LVC" (QVC-type channel) spokesperson displaying popular products of the 1990s. It was directed by Benjamin Skipworth.

== Charts ==
Chart (2018–2019)	Peak position
US Country Airplay (Billboard)	40
US Hot Country Songs (Billboard)	49
