= Doin' Fine =

Single by Lauren Alaina

from the album Road Less Traveled
- Released: May 22, 2017
- Genre: Country pop
- Length: 3:19
- Label: Mercury Nashville; Interscope; 19
- Songwriters: Lauren Alaina; Emily Shackelton; busbee
- Producer: busbee

Lauren Alaina singles chronology
"What Ifs" (2017)	"Doin' Fine" (2017)	"Ladies in the '90s" (2018)

Music videos
- "Doin' Fine" on YouTube
- "Doin' Fine" (Lyric video) on YouTube

"Doin' Fine" is a song recorded by American country music singer Lauren Alaina for her second studio album, Road Less Traveled (2017). Inspired by her parents' divorce, Alaina co-wrote the "semi-autobiographical" song with Emily Shackelton and the record's producer, busbee. It was released to American country radio May 22, 2017 as the album's third and final single.

== Content ==
"Doin' Fine" is an autobiographical song that details the hardships faced by Alaina over the five years between the release of her first album and the recording of her second, including her father's alcoholism and her parents' divorce. The song's chorus addresses the process of overcoming these difficulties and learning to accept life's "crazy" moments. In writing the song, Alaina sought to be "brutally honest" about the events of her life, and requested her parents' permission to share their story.

Billy Dukes of Taste of Country described the song as a "straight-forward pop-country song," but with "more depth and certainly more vocal power" than most contemporary radio songs. Critics also noted the song's thematic similarity to previous single "Road Less Traveled". Alaina sang the song along with “What Ifs” at the 2018 ACM awards in which she won New Female Vocalist of the Year.

== Critical reception ==
Billy Dukes of Taste of Country wrote that "Doin' Fine" has "no sharp edges to turn off radio programmers", and complimented the song's lyrical depth and vocal performance.

== Chart performance ==
"Doin' Fine" debuted at number 59 on the Billboard Country Airplay chart dated June 17, 2017. After leaving the chart for 10 weeks, the song re-entered at number 57 on the chart dated August 26, 2017. It has since reached a peak position of 27. On the week of February 10, 2018, the song debuted at number 50 on the Hot Country Songs chart.

== Music video ==
An official lyric video for the song premiered July 28, 2017. It begins with Alaina writing in a journal and goes on to showcases people going through various struggles, while the lyrics are superimposed in a purportedly handwritten font. "This song isn't just about my story," Alaina wrote in a social media post announcing the video, "It’s for all our stories."

The official music video for the song premiered September 27, 2017. It features Alaina in multiple appearances, demonstrating the varying emotions accompanying the hardships that the song describes. It was nominated for a CMT award in 2018 for "Female Video of the Year".

== Charts ==
=== Weekly charts ===
Chart (2017–2018)	Peak position
US Country Airplay (Billboard)	27
US Hot Country Songs (Billboard)	34

=== Year-end charts ===
Chart (2018)	Position
US Hot Country Songs (Billboard)	95

== Certifications ==
Region	Certification	Certified units/sales
United States (RIAA)	Gold	500,000^{‡}
^{‡} Sales+streaming figures based on certification alone.
