= All My Exes =

Single by Lauren Alaina featuring Chase Matthew

from the album Stages
- Released: August 18, 2025
- Studio: Blackbird Studio (Berry Hill); Big Loud Studio (Nashville)
- Genre: Country
- Length: 2:53
- Label: Big Loud
- Songwriters: Lauren Alaina; Jimmie Gutch; Ben Johnson; Whitney Phillips
- Producers: Joey Moi; Jacob Durrett

Lauren Alaina singles chronology
"Thicc as Thieves" (2023)	"All My Exes" (2025)	"Walking on Broadway" (2026)

Chase Matthew singles chronology
"Darlin'" (2024)	"All My Exes" (2025)	"Holdin' It Down" (2026)

Music video
- "All My Exes" on YouTube

"All My Exes" is a song recorded by American country music artist Lauren Alaina. It was released on August 18, 2025, as the lead single from her fourth studio album, Stages. It features guest vocals from Chase Matthew.

== Background ==
Ben Johnson, Jimmie Gutch, and Whitney Phillips began writing "All My Exes" after Phillips suggested the hook via Zoom call in the early days of the COVID-19 pandemic in either 2020 or 2021. After several years of rewriting verses and pitching it to various artists, Johnson suggested it to Lauren Alaina, who added her vocals to the demo, and it led to her contributing writing credits based on her own breakup she experienced in downtown Nashville in her early 20s. Alaina's husband, Cameron Arnold, reached out to Chase Matthew to lobby for a collaboration, and the recordings were done in Nashville with Joey Moi and Jacob Durrett producing the track.

== Content ==
Topically, the song references a different phase of life than where Alaina currently resides as a happily married woman who recently gave birth to her first child, a daughter. Instead, she expressed enjoyment in being given the "challenge" to write about a different subject than what she is typically drawn to in the current phase of her life.

== Music video ==
The music video for "All My Exes" premiered alongside its digital release on May 9, 2025.

== Chart performance ==
"All My Exes" debuted on the Billboard Country Airplay chart at number 59 for the week dated September 20, 2025. It debuted with the biggest first-week streaming numbers of her career and was the most-added song on country radio the week it impacted. In May 2026, it became Alaina's highest-charting effort on the chart as a lead artist since "Road Less Traveled" in 2017. The song reached number one in late October 2026, becoming Alaina's fifth and Matthew's second number one song.

== Charts ==
Chart performance for "All My Exes"
Chart (2025–2026)	Peak position
Canada Country (Billboard)	35
US Billboard Hot 100	47
US Country Airplay (Billboard)	1
US Hot Country Songs (Billboard)	14
