= Between the Stars =

Studio album by Flyleaf
- Released: September 16, 2014
- Recorded: Los Angeles
- Genre: Post-grunge; pop rock; alternative metal; alternative rock
- Length: 41:35
- Label: Loud & Proud, RED
- Producer: Don Gilmore

Flyleaf chronology
Who We Are (2013)	Between the Stars (2014)

Singles from Between the Stars
- 1. "Set Me on Fire" Released: July 1, 2014; 2. "Thread" Released: January 12, 2015

Professional ratings
Aggregate scores
Source	Rating
Metacritic	(76/100)
Review scores
Source	Rating
AllMusic	3.5/5 stars
CCM Magazine	4/5 stars
Cross Rhythms	9/10 squares
HM Magazine	2/5 stars
Jesus Freak Hideout	3/5 stars
New Release Tuesday	4.5/5 stars

Between the Stars is the fourth studio album by American rock band Flyleaf. The album was released on September 16, 2014, through Loud & Proud Records. The group funded the album through PledgeMusic. It marks the group's only LP to feature Kristen May on vocals, who replaced original vocalist Lacey Sturm who exited the band in 2012. May exited the band in 2016. It is the group's first album to be recorded by producer Don Gilmore. Studio recording was completed in Los Angeles. The album's lead single "Set Me on Fire" debuted on July 1, 2014, at Revolver.

The album sold over 8,200 copies in the United States in its first week of release to land at position No. 33 on the Billboard 200 chart.

The album title is derived from a lyric in the song, "Magnetic".

== Background and release ==
Kristen May stated about making the record: "When we started writing this record, we had a common hardship. Their singer had quit, and my previous band had broken up. As writers, we weren't really sure how to move forward. At the same time, we all had this shared feeling of hope and a second chance. Music came out of those experiences from coming together and persevering through whatever doubts and trials we faced in our lives. It felt like home once we began making music." She also stated: "I hope it's an album people can listen to for years to come. We put our hearts and souls into it, and I want them to hear that."

"Set Me On Fire" was released as the album's lead single and peaked at no. 36 on the Billboard Mainstream Rock chart. The album's second and final single, "Thread," reached no. 37 on the same chart.

== Track listing ==
All music is composed by Flyleaf, except where noted.

Standard edition
No.	Title	Writer(s)	Length
1.	"Set Me on Fire"	Johnny Andrews, Flyleaf	3:37
2.	"Magnetic"	Dave Bassett, Flyleaf	3:41
3.	"Traitor"		2:59
4.	"Platonic" (featuring Bec Hollcraft)		3:30
5.	"Head Underwater"		2:50
6.	"Sober Serenade"		3:46
7.	"Thread"	Don Gilmore, Flyleaf	2:50
8.	"Marionette"	Dave Bassett, Flyleaf	3:47
9.	"Well of Lies"		4:33
10.	"City Kids"		3:52
11.	"Blue Roses"		3:17
12.	"Home"		2:50
Total length:			41:35

Special edition
No.	Title	Length
13.	"Avalanche"	3:30
14.	"Ship of Fools"	3:07
15.	"Tied to the Broken" (demo)	3:43
16.	"City Kids" (live)	3:46
Total length:		55:41

International edition
No.	Title	Length
17.	"The Hunted" (bonus)	2:47
18.	"The Wedding" (bonus)	4:11
Total length:		62:44

Pledge Music edition
No.	Title	Length
17.	"The Wedding"	4:11
Total length:		59:57

== Personnel ==
Flyleaf

- James Culpepper — drums, percussion
- Jared Hartmann — rhythm guitar
- Kristen May — lead vocals
- Pat Seals — bass, backing vocals
- Sameer Bhattacharya — lead guitar, backing vocals, keyboards, piano

Additional personnel

- Produced and mixed by Don Gilmore, Los Angeles
- Engineered by Francesco Cameli
- Pre-production by Dave Hidek and Mark Lewis
- Mastered by Ted Jensen
- Additional composers: Dave Bassett, Don Gilmore and Johnny Andrews
- Art direction and design by Douglas Hale
- Photo by Travis Shinn
