= Mallary Hope =

American country singer-songwriter

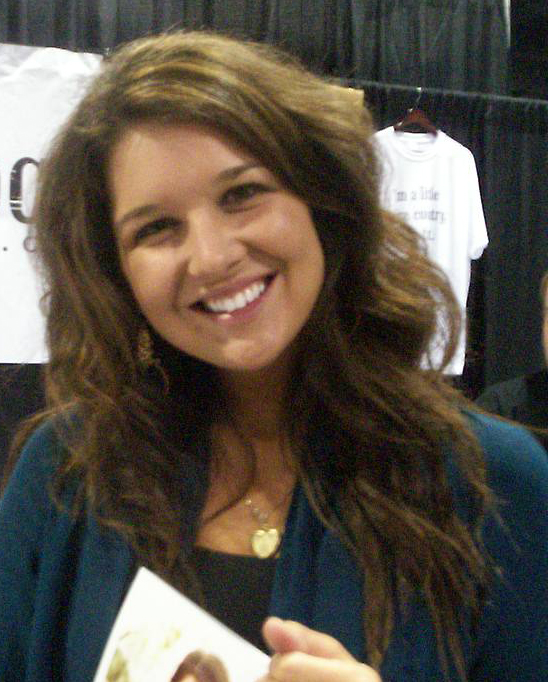
- Hope in 2010

Background information
- Born: Mallary Hope Whitener; June 21, 1987 (age 39); Cohutta, Georgia, U.S.
- Genres: Country, Christian country music
- Occupation: Singer-songwriter
- Instruments: Vocals, guitar
- Years active: 2009–present
- Labels: MCA Nashville, Curb
- Spouse: Ryan Dokke (m. 2014)
- Website: mallaryhope.com

Mallary Hope Whitener (born June 21, 1987 in Cohutta, Georgia) is an American country music singer-songwriter. She released her debut single, "Love Lives On", in July 2009, followed by an EP of the same name on August 4, 2009. Both this song and its follow-up, "Blossom in the Dust," have made the Hot Country Songs charts.

== Musical career ==
Mallary Hope released a digital EP, Love Lives On, on August 4, 2009. This EP includes the title track, as well as "Times Like These" and "Wildflowers". "Love Lives On" debuted at 57 on the U.S. Billboard Hot Country Songs charts dated for August 22, 2009. Jon Caramanica, from The New York Times, included Mallary as part of the new face of country music saying, "The next generation proposes a range of options. It includes...young women with a more traditional style, like Mallary Hope." CMT.com (Country Music Television) praised Hope, saying, "She has a beautifully soothing voice and uses it to its full effect on "Love Lives On," bringing all the sadness out of the song she wrote for her sister and anyone else who has a spouse in the military," and Matt Bjorke of Roughstock said that Hope sounded like a young Faith Hill and that the song "is nevertheless a song that can and should do well at radio." Hope's second single "Blossom in the Dust" was released to radio on February 22, 2010, and debuted at number 60 on the chart for the week of March 20, 2010, peaking at 48.

Hope co-wrote Lauren Alaina's late 2011 single "Georgia Peaches" along with "The Locket", another song on Lauren Alaina's debut album. She sang background vocals on "I Will Love You Still", a track from True Believers, a 2013 album by Darius Rucker and performed a duet with Rucker on the song "Baby, I'm Right", which is included on his fourth album called "Southern Style" which was released in 2015.

== Personal life ==
Hope married Ryan Dokke on April 13, 2014. Mallary and her husband Ryan welcomed daughter Scarlett Ruth Dokke on January 19, 2015. On November 8, 2016, the couple welcomed their second daughter, Savannah Ryan.

== Discography ==
=== Album ===
Title	Album details
Out of My Hands	Release date: April 19, 2019; Label: Curb Records

=== Extended plays ===
Title	Album details
Love Lives On	Release date: August 4, 2009; Label: MCA Nashville
Mallary Hope	Release date: February 2, 2018; Label: Curb Records, Inc.
Christmas Is All About You	Release date: November 8, 2018; Label: Curb Records, Inc.

=== Singles ===
Year	Single	Peak positions			Album
Year	Single	US Country	US Christian	US Christ. Air.	Album
2009	"Love Lives On"	42	—	—	Love Lives On
2010	"Blossom in the Dust"	48	—	—	Love Lives On
2013	"Black Widow”	—	—	—	non-album single
2017	"Now"	—	34	23	Mallary Hope
2018	"Me"	—	—	42	Out of My Hands

=== Music videos ===
Year	Title	Director
2009	"Love Lives On"	Stephen Shepherd
