= Love You Again =

2022 single by Chase Matthew

Single by Chase Matthew

from the album Come Get Your Memory
- Released: December 9, 2022
- Genre: Country
- Length: 2:53
- Label: Warner Nashville
- Songwriters: Chase McQuitty; Casey Brown; Taylor Phillips
- Producer: Austin Shawn

Chase Matthew singles chronology
"County Line" (2021)	"Love You Again" (2022)	"Darlin'" (2024)

Music video
- "Love You Again" on YouTube

"Love You Again" is a song by American country music singer Chase Matthew, released on December 9, 2022 as the lead single from his second studio album Come Get Your Memory (2023). A sleeper hit, it gained wider attention in late 2023. In 2024, it became his first song to enter the Billboard Hot 100, debuting at number 91.

== Background ==
Chase Matthew wrote the song with co-writers Casey Brown and Taylor Phillips at Brown's home studio near Nashville, Tennessee. Much of the demo which he recorded that day was used in the finalized version. Matthew teased the song in 2022 on the video-sharing platform TikTok, where it sparked the #BlackDressTrend in which the song was used in videos of women transitioning from casual clothes into black dresses. Following its release, "Love You Again" was his first song to be played on country radio.

== Content ==
"Love You Again" finds Chase Matthew singing about spending the night with his lover after a tough week.

== Charts ==
=== Weekly charts ===
Weekly chart performance
Chart (2023–2024)	Peak position
Canada Country (Billboard)	40
US Billboard Hot 100	91
US Country Airplay (Billboard)	9
US Hot Country Songs (Billboard)	24

=== Year-end charts ===
Annual chart rankings
Chart (2024)	Position
US Country Airplay (Billboard)	16
US Hot Country Songs (Billboard)	41
US Radio Songs (Billboard)	75

== Certifications ==
Certifications for "Love You Again"
Region	Certification	Certified units/sales
Canada (Music Canada)	Gold	40,000^{‡}
United States (RIAA)	Platinum	1,000,000^{‡}
^{‡} Sales+streaming figures based on certification alone.
