= Lauren Alaina (EP) =

EP by Lauren Alaina
- Released: October 2, 2015
- Genre: Country; country pop
- Length: 16:55
- Label: Mercury Nashville; Interscope; 19
- Producer: busbee

Lauren Alaina chronology
Wildflower (2011)	Lauren Alaina (2015)	Road Less Traveled (2017)

Singles from Lauren Alaina
- 1. "Next Boyfriend" Released: September 18, 2015; 2. "Road Less Traveled" Released: July 11, 2016

Lauren Alaina is the second extended play recorded by the American country music singer Lauren Alaina, released to digital retailers on October 2, 2015, by Mercury Nashville, Interscope Records and 19 Recordings. It promotes Alaina's second studio album, Road Less Traveled the follow-up to Wildflower (2011). Alaina co-wrote all five tracks.

== Background and promotion ==
In May 2013, Alaina released the country pop-leaning "Barefoot and Buckwild", which she co-wrote, as the purported lead single for her second album. Following the song stalling at a moderate 56 on the Country Airplay chart, promotion for the project seemingly ceased. After undergoing vocal surgery in August 2014, Alaina told the country music blog The Boot that she was beginning work on a new album with a "more mature" feel.

Alaina was selected by ESPN to write and record a promotional single for its college football campaign. Her contribution, "History", was released on August 31, 2015, and was the first promotional single from the album. She announced Lauren Alaina in September 2015 as a prelude to her then-forthcoming album, due out in 2016, with five songs from the album.

== Track listing ==
All tracks are written by Lauren Alaina, with additional co-writers noted.

No.	Title	Writer(s)	Length
1.	"Road Less Traveled"	Jesse Frasure; Meghan Trainor	3:36
2.	"Holding the Other"	Emily Weisband; Eric Olson	3:56
3.	"Next Boyfriend"	Weisband; Matt McVaney	3:12
4.	"Painting Pillows"	Alex Masters; Lindsay Rimes	3:17
5.	"History"	Frasure; Weisband	2:54
Total length:			16:55

== Chart performance ==
The EP debuted at number 28 on the Billboard Top Country Albums chart with first week sales of 1,600.

Chart (2015)	Peak position
US Top Country Albums (Billboard)	28
