= Road Less Traveled (Lauren Alaina album) =

Studio album by Lauren Alaina
- Released: January 27, 2017
- Recorded: 2013–16
- Genres: Country; country pop
- Length: 42:08
- Labels: Mercury Nashville; Interscope; 19
- Producer: busbee

Lauren Alaina chronology
Lauren Alaina (2015)	Road Less Traveled (2017)	Getting Good (2020)

Singles from Road Less Traveled
- 1. "Next Boyfriend" Released: September 18, 2015; 2. "Road Less Traveled" Released: July 11, 2016; 3. "Doin' Fine" Released: May 22, 2017

Road Less Traveled is the second studio album by American country music artist Lauren Alaina. The album was released on January 27, 2017, by Mercury Nashville and Interscope Records. It includes the number one single of the same name.

== Background ==
In January 2013, Alaina tweeted that she had started recording for her second album. She released a new song, "Barefoot and Buckwild", as the record's purported lead single in May 2013, however it failed to perform on the charts. In August 2014, Alaina underwent vocal surgery; after her recovery, she returned to the studio to work on new material with a "more mature" feel. By June 2015, she stated that the album was nearly finished. Alaina has said that this album will be different from her first and describes it as, "[having] some fun songs and sad songs – a little bit of what my life has been like over the past few years."

The album features four tracks that are on Alaina's self-titled EP, which was released in October 2015. Alaina announced the album's title and track listing on December 5, 2016. Alaina co-wrote all twelve tracks over three and a half years. Road Less Traveled became available for pre-order on December 16, 2016.

== Singles ==
"Next Boyfriend" was released as the album's first single on September 15, 2015.

The title track, "Road Less Traveled" was released as the album's second single on July 11, 2016. It had previously served as the second single from Alaina's 2015 self-titled EP.

"Doin' Fine" impacted American country radio on May 22, 2017, as the album's third single.

=== Other songs ===
"Queen of Hearts" was released to digital retailers as the album's first promotional single on December 30, 2016. "Same Day Different Bottle" was released as the second promotional single on January 13, 2017.

== Critical reception ==
Professional ratings
Review scores
Source	Rating
AllMusic	3.5/5 stars
Roughstock	Positive
Sounds Like Nashville	Positive
Taste of Country	Mixed
The Young Folks	6/10

Road Less Traveled received generally mixed-to-positive reviews from music critics. Stephen Thomas Erlewine of AllMusic rated the album three-and-a-half stars out of five and complimented Alaina on her songwriting. "She may drift into the saccharine when she slows the tempo," he writes, "but the faster cuts are usually jubilant and help propel Road Less Traveled... into a strong modern country-pop album." Marissa Moss of Rolling Stone wrote that the album "marks not just a transition from singer to writer," but "[traces] the events of [Alaina's] life," through inspiring songs that, she says, harken back to the peak of Shania Twain's career. Katie Gill of pop culture blog The Young Folks rated the album six out of ten for its "polished" production and "uneven" songwriting. "When it's good, it's ridiculously good," she writes, "but the majority of the songs are middle of the road to outright bad."

Matt Bjorke of Roughstock wrote a positive review of the album, which he says showcases Alaina's "growth" both as an artist and as a person and which "[feels] ready to make Lauren a household name." Laura Hostelley of Sounds Like Nashville praised the "carefully crafted" album for combining personal lyrics with "modern and consistent" production that "allows opportunities for Alaina's voice to hold the spotlight." In the blog's Album Spotlight feature, Taste of Country writer Cillea Houghton gave the album a mixed review. "Road Less Traveled starts off strong," she writes, "but gets a little watered down in the middle... But where it blends in melodically, Road Less Traveled stands out at the core with its lyrics, all about empowerment, positivity and loving yourself no matter what you’re faced with in life."

== Commercial performance ==
The album debuted at No. 31 on the Billboard 200, and No. 3 on Top Country Albums in its first week of release. It sold 9,700 copies in the first week, and a further 2,800 in the second week. The album has sold 34,500 copies in the US as of January 2018.

== Track listing ==
All tracks are written by Lauren Alaina, with additional co-writers noted.

No.	Title	Writer(s)	Length
1.	"Doin' Fine"	Emily Shackelton; busbee	3:19
2.	"My Kinda People"	busbee; Emily Weisband	3:03
3.	"Three"	Seth Ennis; Jordan Reynolds	3:46
4.	"Road Less Traveled"	Meghan Trainor; Jesse Frasure	3:36
5.	"Queen of Hearts"	Lindsay Lee; Victoria Banks	2:55
6.	"Think Outside the Boy"	Shackelton	3:41
7.	"Painting Pillows"	Lindsay Jack Rimes; Alex Masters	3:17
8.	"Next Boyfriend"	Weisband; Matt McVaney	3:12
9.	"Crashin' the Boys Club"	Weisband; Johan Fransson	2:57
10.	"Same Day Different Bottle"	Caitlyn Smith; Dan Couch	3:49
11.	"Holding the Other"	Weisband; Eric Olson	3:56
12.	"Pretty"	Weisband; Felicia Barton	4:37
Total length:			42:08

== Personnel ==
Vocals

- Lauren Alaina – Lead vocals, Background vocals
- Erika Attwater – Background vocals
- busbee – Background vocals
- Stephcynie Curry – Background vocals
- Seth Ennis – Background vocals
- Morgan Hebert – Background vocals
- Carolyn Dawn Johnson – Background vocals
- Kim Keyes – Background vocals
- Kristin Rogers – Background vocals
- Russell Terrell – Background vocals
- Emily Weisband – Background vocals

Musicians

- busbee – Keyboards, piano
- Joeie Canaday – Bass guitar
- Dave Cohen – Hammond B-3 organ, piano, synthesizer, Wurlitzer
- J.T. Corenflos – Electric guitar
- David Dorn – Hammond B-3 organ, piano, synthesizer, Wurlitzer
- Dan Dugmore – Pedal steel guitar
- Mark Hill – Bass guitar
- Evan Hutchings – Drums, percussion
- Mike Johnson – Pedal steel guitar
- Tony Lucido – Bass guitar
- Pat McGrath – Banjo, acoustic guitar, mandolin
- Jerry McPherson – Electric guitar
- Carl Miner – Banjo, bouzouki, acoustic guitar, mandolin
- Russ Pahl – Pedal steel guitar
- Justin Schipper – Pedal steel guitar
- Aaron Sterling – Drums, percussion
- Jason Webb – Hammond B-3 organ, piano, synthesizer, Wurlitzer
- Derek Wells – Banjo, electric guitar, mandolin

Production

- Daniel Bacigalupi – Mixing assistant
- Sean R. Badum – Assistant engineer
- Charlie Brocco – Assistant engineer
- Casey Brown – Programming
- busbee – Assistant engineer, digital editing, engineering, production, programming
- Dave Clauss – Digital editing, engineering
- Jim Cooley – Engineering
- Paul "Paco" Cossette – Mixing assistant
- Jonathan Fransson – Engineering
- Jesse Frasure – Programming
- Evan Hutchings – Programming
- Scott Johnson – Production assistant
- Mason Levy – Programming
- Andrew Mendelson – Mastering
- Justin Niebank – Mixing assistant
- Ernesto Olivera – Assistant engineering
- Eric Olson – Programming
- Lindsay Rimes – Programming
- Juan Sevilla – Assistant engineer
- Brandon Shexnayder – Assistant engineering
- Reid Shippen – Mixing
- Melissa Spillman – Production assistant
- Mike Stankiewicz – Assistant engineer
- Aaron Sterling – Engineering
- Derek Wells – Engineering
- Brian David Willis – Digital editing
- Steph Wright – A&R

Imagery

- Lauren Alaina – Art direction
- Karen Naff – Art direction, design

== Charts ==
Chart (2017)	Peak position
UK Country Albums (Official Charts)	7
US Billboard 200	31
US Top Country Albums (Billboard)	3
