= Busbee =

American musical artist (1976–2019)

- Born: Michael James Ryan Busbee; June 18, 1976; Walnut Creek, California, U.S.
- Died: September 29, 2019 (aged 43) Los Angeles, California, U.S.
- Genres: Pop; country
- Occupations: Songwriter; record producer; publisher; record executive
- Years active: 2000–2019

Michael James Ryan Busbee (June 18, 1976 – September 29, 2019), known professionally as Busbee, was an American songwriter, record producer, publisher, record executive, and multi-instrumentalist. He was known for his work in both pop music and country music, having written for acts including 5 Seconds of Summer, Keith Urban, Lady A, Maren Morris, Trisha Yearwood, Daughtry, and the Fray.

== Early life ==
Busbee was born in Walnut Creek, California, and grew up in the San Francisco Bay Area. He began playing piano when he was seven years old, was trained in brass by Dan Vigus at Ygnacio Valley Christian School, and started playing jazz trombone in high school. Busbee marched with the World Class Drum Corps, Blue Devils.

Busbee studied jazz at William Paterson University in Wayne, New Jersey, after receiving a scholarship to the school in 1995, but returned to the San Francisco Bay Area before graduating.

== Career ==
He moved to Los Angeles in 2000 and started working at a music studio, assisting rock producer Eric Valentine, and he began learning to play more instruments, including guitar, bass, and drums. After working and assisting others in music studios for a while, he began working on his own as a songwriter, producer, mixer, writer, and engineer. He started working on many pop songs, with many artists who had been on reality singing competitions like American Idol and The X Factor.

After five years of working in Los Angeles, he started working in Nashville, Tennessee, as well, at the recommendation of another writer. Musician and record producer Dann Huff then signed him to a publishing deal. Since then, Busbee wrote for and co-wrote with a broad range of artists including Gwen Stefani, P!nk, Shakira, Maren Morris, Timbaland featuring Katy Perry, Keith Urban, Jon Bellion, Kelly Clarkson, Florida Georgia Line, and Lady Antebellum. Busbee was nominated for a Grammy Award for Best Country Song in 2017 for his work on Maren Morris' debut single, "My Church".

In December 2018, Busbee started his own music label, Altadena, in Los Angeles in partnership with Warner Bros. Records, Warner Chappell Music, and Red Light Management.

== Personal life ==
Busbee was diagnosed with glioblastoma, a form of brain cancer, during 2019 and died later that year on September 29, in Los Angeles. He had a wife and three children.

== Discography ==
=== Songs written ===
Discography
Artist	Album	Song	Co-written with	Notes
5 Seconds of Summer	5 Seconds of Summer (2014)	"Don't Stop”	Luke Hemmings, Calum Hood, Steve Robson	Single
5 Seconds of Summer	5 Seconds of Summer (2014)	"The Only Reason”	Steve Robson, Michael Clifford	—N/a
The Head and the Heart	Living Mirage (2019)	"See You Through My Eyes"	Anastasia Laura Whiteacre, Jonathan Eric Russell	—N/a
Christina Aguilera	Lotus (2012)	"Empty Words"	Christina Aguilera, Nikki Flores, Ali Tamposi	—N/a
Lauren Alaina	Road Less Traveled (2016)	"Doin' Fine"	Lauren Alaina, Emily Shackleton	—N/a
Lauren Alaina	Road Less Traveled (2016)	"My Kinda People"	Lauren Alaina, Emily Shackleton	—N/a
Jason Aldean	My Kinda Party (2010)	"Days Like These"	Neil Thrasher, Wendell Mobley	—N/a
Jason Aldean	Night Train (2012)	"This Nothing Town"	Neil Thrasher, Wendell Mobley	
Allstar Weekend	All the Way (2011)	"Not Your Birthday" (feat. Anth)	Anthony Melo, JP Clark, Jayce Levi	Single
Allstar Weekend	All the Way (2011)	"Do It 2 Me"	Zachary Porter, JP Clark, Jayce Levi	—N/a
Backstreet Boys	This Is Us (2009)	"Masquerade"	Brian Kennedy, Alex James, Antwoine Collins	—N/a
Jon Bellion	The Human Condition (2016)	"80's Films"	Jon Bellion	—N/a
Jon Bellion	The Human Condition (2016)	"Maybe IDK"	Jon Bellion	—N/a
Jon Bellion	Glory Sound Prep (2018)	"Blu"	Jon Bellion	—N/a
Better Than Ezra	Paper Empire (2009)	"Black Light"	Kevin Griffin	—N/a
Better Than Ezra	Paper Empire (2009)	"Turn Up The Bright Lights"	Kevin Griffin, Michelle Lewis	—N/a
Better Than Ezra	Paper Empire (2009)	"In Between The Moments"	Kevin Griffin	—N/a
Better Than Ezra	Paper Empire (2009)	"Wounded"	Kevin Griffin	—N/a
Better Than Ezra	Paper Empire (2009)	"All in"	Kevin Griffin, James Bourne	—N/a
Better Than Ezra	Super Magick (2024)	"This Time"	Kevin Griffin, Michelle Lewis	—N/a
Boyzone	Brother (2010)	"Nothing Without You”	Catt Gravitt, Tom Shapiro	—N/a
Danielle Bradbery	Danielle Bradbery (2013)	"Yellin' From The Rooftop"	Sarah Buxton	—N/a
Danielle Bradbery	Danielle Bradbery (2013)	"Endless Summer”	Sarah Buxton, Jedd Hughes	—N/a
Toni Braxton	Pulse (2010)	"If I Have to Wait"	Toni Braxton, Jud Friesman, Allan Rich	
Garth Brooks	Man Against Machine (2014)	"People Loving People"	Lee Thomas Miller, Chris Wallin	
Alexandra Burke	Overcome (2009)	"Bad Boys" (feat. Flo Rida)	Melvin K. Watson Jr., Larry Summerville Jr., Alex James, Lauren Evans Tramar Dillard	Single (#1 UK Singles Chart, Brit Award Nomination)
Kelly Clarkson	Stronger (2011)	"Dark Side"	Alexander Geringas	Single (#1 Billboard Dance Chart)
Daughtry	Break the Spell (2011)	"We're Not Gonna Fall"	Chris Daughtry, Zac Maloy	—N/a
Daughtry	Break the Spell (2011)	"Gone Too Soon"	Chris Daughtry	—N/a
Daughtry	Break the Spell (2011)	"Losing My Mind"	Chris Daughtry	—N/a
Daughtry	Baptized (2013)	"I'll Fight”	Chris Daughtry	—N/a
Daughtry	Baptized (2013)	"High Above The Ground”	Chris Daughtry	—N/a
Gavin DeGraw	Make a Move (2013)	"Who's Gonna Save Us"	Gavin DeGraw	—N/a
Lee DeWyze	Live It Up (2010)	"A Song About Love"	Lee DeWyze, Espen Lind, Amund Bjørklund, David Hodges	—N/a
Lee DeWyze	Live It Up (2010)	"It's Gotta Be Love"	Lee DeWyze, Espen Lind, Amund Bjørklund, Claude Kelly	—N/a
Lee DeWyze	Live It Up (2010)	"Stay Here"	Lee DeWyze, Espen Lind, Claude Kelly	—N/a
Colton Dixon	A Messenger (2013)	"Noise"	Colton Dixon	—N/a
Colton Dixon	A Messenger (2013)	"You Are”	Colton Dixon, Rhyan Shirley, Jared Martin	Single
Edurne	Climax (2013)	"Pretty Boy"	Meghan Kabir	Single
Edurne	Climax (2013)	"31 Seconds Alone"	Alex James, E. Kidd Bogart, Jim Jonsin	—N/a
Edurne	Climax (2013)	"Bullets & Butterflies"	Andrew Dorff, Dwight Baker	—N/a
Sara Evans	Slow Me Down (2014)	"Good Love Is Hard To Find”	Sarah Buxton, Dave Berg	—N/a
Florida Georgia Line	Dig Your Roots (2016)	"H.O.L.Y"	Nate Cyphert, William Wiik Larsen	Single
Dia Frampton	Red (2011)	Don't Kick The Chair (feat. Kid Cudi)"	Dia Frampton, Scott Mescudi, Julie Frost	Single
Dia Frampton	Red (2011)	"I Will" (feat. Blake Shelton)	Dia Frampton, Tom Shapiro	—N/a
Dia Frampton	Red (2011)	"Good Boy"	Dia Frampton, Chris Seefried	—N/a
Dia Frampton	Red (2011)	"Love Can Come From Anywhere"	Dia Frampton	—N/a
The Fray	Helios (2014)	"Hold My Hand”	The Fray	—N/a
The Fray	Helios (2014)	"Give it Away”	The Fray	—N/a
The Fray	Helios (2014)	"Our Last Days”	The Fray	
Martin Garrix	"Don't Look Down" (2015)	"Don't Look Down (Ft. Usher)" feat. Usher	Martin Garrix, Usher Raymond, James Abrahart	Single
Girls' Generation	Run Devil Run (2010)	"Run Devil Run"	Alex James, Kalle Engström, Hong Ji-yoo, Nakamura Kanata	Single
Giorgia	Dietro le apparenze (2011)	"Hostage" (È l'amore che conta)	Giorgia Todrani, Allan Rich, Jud Firdman	Single
Giorgia	—N/a	"Did I Lose You" (feat. Olly Murs)	—N/a	
Hunter Hayes	Hunter Hayes (2011)	"Storm Warning"	Hunter Hayes, Gordie Sampson	Single
Jana Kramer	Thirty One (2015)	"Said No One Ever"	Nicolle Gaylon, Natalie Hemby	Single
Lady A	Need You Now (2010)	"Our Kind of Love"	Hillary Scott, Charles Kelley, Dave Haywood	Single (#1 Billboard US Country)
Lady A	Need You Now (2010)	"Ready to Love Again"	Hillary Scott, Charles Kelley, Dave Haywood	—N/a
Lady A	Own the Night (2011)	"When You Were Mine"	Hillary Scott, Charles Kelley, Dave Haywood	—N/a
Lady A	747 (2014)	"Falling for You"	Hillary Scott, Charles Kelley, Dave Haywood	—N/a
Lady A	The Best of Me (2014)	"Falling for You"	Hillary Scott, Charles Kelley, Dave Haywood	—N/a
Lady A	Heart Break (2017)			
Lady A	Heart Break (2017)	"You Look Good"	Ryan Hurd, Hillary Lindsey	Single (#9 US Billboard Hot Country Songs)
Lady A	Heart Break (2017)	'"Somebody Else's Heart"	Hillary Scott, Charles Kelley, Dave Haywood, Shane McAnally	—N/a
Lady A	Heart Break (2017)	"Army"	Hillary Scott, Charles Kelley, Dave Haywood, Nicolle Galyon	—N/a
Lady A	Heart Break (2017)	"Good Time to Be Alive"	Hillary Scott, Charles Kelley, Dave Haywood, Will Weatherly, Emily Weisband	—N/a
Lady A	Heart Break (2017)	"Stars"	Hillary Scott, Charles Kelley, Dave Haywood	—N/a
Lady A	Heart Break (2017)	"Home"	Hillary Scott, Charles Kelley, Dave Haywood	—N/a
Adam Lambert	Trespassing (2012)	"Take Back"	Adam Lambert	—N/a
Little Big Town	Pain Killer (2014)	"Quit Breaking Up With Me"	Natalie Hemby, Shane McAnally	—N/a
Scotty McCreery	See You Tonight (2013)	"Now”	Scotty McCreery, Frank Rogers	—N/a
Scotty McCreery	See You Tonight (2013)	"Buzzin”	Frank Rogers	—N/a
Katharine McPhee	Unbroken (2010)	"How"	Lucie Silvas, Alex James	—N/a
Bea Miller	Young Blood (2014)	"Enemy Fire"	Meghan Kabir	—N/a
Maren Morris	Hero (2016)	"My Church"	Maren Morris	Single (#5 Billboard Hot Country Songs)
Maren Morris	Hero (2016)	"80s Mercedes"	Maren Morris	—N/a
Maren Morris	Hero (2016)	"How It's Done"	Maren Morris, Natalie Hemby	—N/a
Maren Morris	Hero (2016)	"Once"	Maren Morris	—N/a
Kellie Pickler	The Woman I Am (2013)	"I Forgive You"	Hillary Lindsey, Aimee Mayo	—N/a
P!nk	The Truth About Love (2012)	"Try"	Ben West	Single (#1 Billboard Adult Pop Chart, Billboard Adult Contemporary Chart)
Cassadee Pope	Frame by Frame (2013)	"Edge of a Thunderstorm”	Cassadee Pope, Liz Rose	—N/a
Rascal Flatts	Still Feels Good (2007)	"Better Now"	Gregory Becker, Darrell Brown	—N/a
Rascal Flatts	Unstoppable (2009)	Summer Nights"	Gary LeVox, Brett James	Single (#2 Billboard Country Chart)
Rascal Flatts	Nothing Like This (2010)	"Sunday Afternoon"	Joe Don Rooney	—N/a
Rascal Flatts	Rewind (2014)	Rascal Flatts		—N/a
Rascal Flatts	"She Must Like Broken Hearts”	Back to Us (2017)	"Hands Talk"	Gary LeVox, Jon Nite
Haley Reinhart	Listen Up! (2012)	"Free"	Lucie Silvas	Single
Haley Reinhart	Listen Up! (2012)	"Wasted Tears"	Haley Reinhart, Jonthan Green	—N/a
Haley Reinhart	Listen Up! (2012)	"What You Don't Know"	Haley Reinhart, Sam Watters	—N/a
Chris Rene	I'm Right Here (2012)	"Trouble"	Jason Bonilla, Alex Lambert	Single
The Rosso Sisters	Hola Hola (2014)	"We Don't Care About That Anyway"	—N/a	—N/a
Shakira	Shakira (2014)	"Broken Record" "23"	Shakira	—N/a
Blake Shelton	If I'm Honest (2016)	"Every Goodbye"	Ryan Hurd, Liz Rose	—N/a
Jessica Sutta	—N/a	"Show Me" (2011)	Alexander Geringas, Paddy Dalton	Single (#1 Billboard Dance Chart)
Rosie Thomas	If Songs Could Be Held (2005)	"Pretty Dress"	Rosie Thomas	
Rosie Thomas	If Songs Could Be Held (2005)	"Guess It May"	Rosie Thomas	
Rosie Thomas	If Songs Could Be Held (2005)	"Say What You Want"	Rosie Thomas	
Rosie Thomas	If Songs Could Be Held (2005)	"Time Goes Away"	Rosie Thomas	
Rosie Thomas	If Songs Could Be Held (2005)	"Tomorrow"	Rosie Thomas	
Timbaland	Shock Value II (2009)	"If We Ever Meet Again" (feat. Katy Perry)	T.Mosley, James Washington	Single (#3 UK Singles Chart)
Keith Urban	Get Closer (2010)	"All For You”	Chris Eaton	—N/a
Keith Urban	Ripcord (2016)	"Sun Don't Let Me Down" (featuring Nile Rodgers and Pitbull)	Keith Urban, Nile Rodgers, Pitbull	—N/a
Keith Urban	Ripcord (2016)	"The Fighter" (feat. Carrie Underwood)	Keith Urban	—N/a
Keith Urban	Ripcord (2016)	"Your Body"	Keith Urban	—N/a
Vedera	Stages (2009)	"Goodbye My Love”	Vedera, Simon Wilcox, James Bourne, Kasia Livingston	—N/a
Carly Pearce	Every Little Thing (2017)	"Every Little Thing"	Carly Pearce, Emily Shackelton	Single
Carly Pearce	Every Little Thing (2017)	"Everybody Gonna Talk"	Carly Pearce, Emily Weisband	—N/a
Carly Pearce	Every Little Thing (2017)	"Catch Fire"	Natalie Hemby	—N/a
Carly Pearce	Every Little Thing (2017)	"If My Name Was Whiskey"	Carly Pearce, Shane McAnally	—N/a
Carly Pearce	Every Little Thing (2017)	"Color"	Carly Pearce, Laura Veltz	—N/a
Carly Pearce	Every Little Thing (2017)	"Feel Somethin’"	Shane McAnally, Natalie Hemby	—N/a
Carly Pearce	Every Little Thing (2017)	"You Know Where to Find Me"	Carly Pearce, Emily Shackelton	—N/a
Carly Pearce	Every Little Thing (2017)	"Honeysuckle"	Barry Dean, Hillary Lindsey	—N/a
Trisha Yearwood	Every Girl (2019)	Can't Take Back Goodbye	Busbee, Caitlyn Smith, Troy Verges	
Lauren Daigle	Non-album single	"Let It Be a Hallelujah"	Busbee, Jonas Myrin, Daigle	

=== Production and co-production ===
Discography
Artist	Album	Song	Co-produced with
Christina Aguilera	Lotus (2012)	"Empty Words"	—N/a
Lauren Alaina	Lauren Alaina EP (2015)	"Next Boyfriend" (2015)	—N/a
Lauren Alaina	Road Less Traveled (2016)	All tracks	—N/a
Allstar Weekend	All the Way (2011)	"Not Your Birthday" (feat. Anth)	—N/a
Allstar Weekend	All the Way (2011)	"Do It 2 Me"	—N/a
Daughtry	Baptized (2013)	"I'll Fight”	DreZa
Daughtry	Baptized (2013)	"High Above The Ground”	Mason "MdL" Levy
Gavin DeGraw	Make a Move (2013)	"Who's Gonna Save Us"	DreZa
Dia Frampton	Red (2011)		
Dia Frampton	Red (2011)	"I Will" (feat. Blake Shelton)	—N/a
Dia Frampton	Red (2011)	"Good Boy"	J. Bonilla
Girls' Generation	Run Devil Run (2010)	"Run Devil Run"	Alex James, Kalle Engström
Lady Antebellum	747 (2014)	"Falling for You"	—N/a
Lady Antebellum	The Best of Me (2014)	"Falling for You"	—N/a
Lady Antebellum	Heart Break (2017)	All tracks	—N/a
Adam Lambert	Trespassing (2012)	"Take Back"	J. Bonilla
Ingrid Michaelson	Lights Out (2014)	"Time Machine"	—N/a
Bea Miller	Young Blood (2014)	"Enemy Fire"	—N/a
Maren Morris	Hero (2016)	"My Church"	Maren Morris
Maren Morris	Hero (2016)	"80's Mercedes"	Maren Morris
Maren Morris	Hero (2016)	"Sugar"	Maren Morris
Maren Morris	Hero (2016)	"How It's Done"	Maren Morris
Maren Morris	Hero (2016)	"Rich"	Maren Morris
Maren Morris	Hero (2016)	"Just Another Thing"	Maren Morris
Maren Morris	Hero (2016)	"Second Wind"	Maren Morris
Maren Morris	Hero (2016)	"I Could Use A Love Song"	Maren Morris
Maren Morris	Hero (2016)	"Once"	Maren Morris
Maren Morris	Hero (2016)	"Company You Keep"	Maren Morris, Brad Hill
Maren Morris	Hero (2016)	"Drunk Girls Don't Cry"	Maren Morris, Brad Hill
Haley Reinhart	Listen Up! (2012)	"What You Don't Know"	J. Bonilla
Haley Reinhart	Listen Up! (2012)	"Walking on Heaven"	—N/a
Haley Reinhart	Listen Up! (2012)	"Hit the Ground Running"	—N/a
Haley Reinhart	—N/a	"Baby, It's Cold Outside"	—N/a
Chris Rene	I'm Right Here (2012)	"Trouble"	J. Bonilla
Shakira	Shakira (2014)	"Broken Record"	Shakira
Shakira	Shakira (2014)	"Medicine" (feat. Blake Shelton)	Shakira
Shakira	Shakira (2014)	"23"	Shakira
Rosie Thomas	If Songs Could Be Held (2005)	All tracks	
Keith Urban	Ripcord (2016)	"Sun Don't Let Me Down" (feat. Pitbull)	Keith Urban, Nile Rodgers
Keith Urban	Ripcord (2016)	"The Fighter"	Keith Urban
Keith Urban	Ripcord (2016)	"Your Body"	Keith Urban

==== Other songs ====
- Cris Cab – "The Truth", "The Sun Is Gonna Rise Again"
- Eliza Doolittle – "I'm in Love With You”
- Mickey Guyton – "Safe"
- Girls' Generation – "Chain Reaction"
- Danny Gokey – "I Still Believe"
- Jetta - "More (Demo)"
- Francesca Michielin – "Il più bell'abbraccio"
- Ryan Star – "Stay Awhile" Single'
- Westlife – "Get Away”
- Elliott Yamin -"In Love With You Forever", "The Bridge Is Burning"
- Dima Bilan & Anastacia - "Safety"
- Cale Dodds - "I Like Where This Is Going"
- P!nk - "More"
