= Sitting Pretty on Top of the World =

Studio album by Lauren Alaina
- Released: September 3, 2021
- Studios: Sound Stage, Nashville; TB12, Nashville; Ocean Way, Nashville; Rock the Soul Ent, Nashville
- Genre: Country
- Length: 50:28
- Label: Mercury Nashville
- Producers: Paul DiGiovanni (all tracks except 3); David Garcia (track 3)

Lauren Alaina chronology
Road Less Traveled (2017)	Sitting Pretty on Top of the World (2021)	Unlocked (2023)

Singles from Sitting Pretty on Top of the World
- 1. "Getting Good" Released: October 7, 2019; 2. "Getting Over Him" Released: February 22, 2021

Sitting Pretty on Top of the World is the third studio album by American country music singer Lauren Alaina. It was released in September 2021 via Mercury Records Nashville.

== Content ==
The album consists of fifteen songs, fourteen of which Alaina co-wrote. Two singles, "Getting Good" and the Jon Pardi duet "Getting Over Him", were released prior to the album. Both of these appeared on extended plays prior to the album's release; on Sitting Pretty on Top of the World, "Getting Good" was remixed as a duet with Trisha Yearwood. Paul DiGiovanni and David Garcia produced the album.

== Critical reception ==
Stephen Thomas Erlewine of AllMusic rated the album three stars out of five, stating that "as a collection of individual tracks, Sitting Pretty on Top of the World hits its target squarely in the middle of the road: it's adult contemporary country where Alaina feels equally at home on the light pop tunes and melodramatic showstoppers."

== Track listing ==
Sitting Pretty on Top of the World track listing
No.	Title	Writer(s)	Length
1.	"It Was Me"	Lauren Alaina; Hillary Lindsey	4:43
2.	"If the World Was a Small Town"	Alaina; David Garcia; Josh Miller	2:54
3.	"Getting Good" (with Trisha Yearwood)	Emily Weisband	3:20
4.	"Same Story, Different Saturday Night"	Alaina; Lindsey; Lori McKenna; Liz Rose	3:20
5.	"On Top of the World"	Alaina; Jordan Reynolds; Sasha Alex Sloan	3:16
6.	"Run"	Alaina; Ben Johnson; Kennedi Lykken	3:19
7.	"What Do You Think Of?" (featuring Lukas Graham)	Alaina; Jens Carlsson; Asia Whiteacre	3:38
8.	"I'm Not Sad Anymore"	Alaina; Lindsey; McKenna; Rose	3:20
9.	"Getting Over Him" (featuring Jon Pardi)	Alaina; Paul DiGiovanni; Weisband	2:46
10.	"Good Ole Boy"	Alaina; Garcia; Miller	3:26
11.	"When the Party's Over"	Alaina; Garcia; Corey Crowder	3:03
12.	"You Ain't a Cowboy"	Alaina; Casey Brown; Parker Welling	3:27
13.	"Goodbye Street"	Alaina; Jacob Durrett; Ernest K. Smith	2:54
14.	"Written in the Bar"	Alaina; Lindsey; McKenna; Rose	3:20
15.	"Change My Mind"	Alaina; Cameron Bedell; Seth Ennis	3:42
Total length:			50:28

== Personnel ==
Adapted from album's liner notes.

Musicians

- Lauren Alaina – lead vocals (all tracks), background vocals (all tracks)
- Dave Cohen – keyboards (track 3)
- Paul DiGiovanni – acoustic guitar (track 9), electric guitar (tracks 2, 4, 6, 8, 9, 11, 14), keyboards (tracks 2, 4, 5, 8, 10–15), programming (all tracks except 3), background vocals (tracks 2, 5, 6, 8, 10, 15)
- Jacob Durrett – programming (track 13)
- Jeneé Fleenor – fiddle (track 9)
- David Garcia – electric guitar (track 3), keyboards (track 3), programming (track 3)
- Lukas Graham – duet vocals (track 7)
- Ben Johnson – programming (track 9)
- Hillary Lindsey – background vocals (tracks 1, 4, 8, 14)
- Tony Lucido – bass guitar (tracks 6, 9)
- Miles McPherson – drums (track 3)
- Rob McNelley – electric guitar (track 3)
- Jon Pardi – duet vocals (track 9)
- Jordan Reynolds – programming (track 5)
- Jimmie Lee Sloas – bass guitar (tracks 1–5, 8, 10–15)
- Ernest K. Smith – background vocals (track 13)
- Ilya Toshinsky – acoustic guitar (all tracks except 7)
- Derek Wells – electric guitar (all tracks except 7)
- Alex Wright – keyboards (all tracks except 3)
- Trisha Yearwood – duet vocals (track 3)
- Nir Z. – drums (all tracks except 3 & 7)

Production

- Joel McKenney – assistant engineering (all tracks except 3)
- Cary Barlowe – vocal recording (all tracks except 3)
- Jim Cooley – engineering, mixing (all tracks except 3)
- Adam Ayan – mastering (all tracks except 3)
- Jeff Balding – engineering (track 3)
- David Garcia – vocal recording (track 3)
- Mark Endert – mixing (track 3)
- Stephen Marcussen – mastering (track 3)

Imagery

- Karen Naff – art direction
- Wendy Stamberger – design
- Katie Kauss – photography
- Amber Cannon, Meri Fernandes – hair and makeup
- Amber Lehman – wardrobe stylist
- Kera Jackson – art production

== Chart performance ==
Chart (2021)	Peak position
US Billboard 200	173
US Top Country Albums (Billboard)	21
