= Darlin' (Chase Matthew song) =

2024 single by Chase Matthew

Single by Chase Matthew

from the EP We All Grow Up
- Released: February 16, 2024
- Genre: Country
- Length: 2:45
- Label: Warner Nashville
- Songwriters: Chase McQuitty; Alex Maxwell; Ciaran Wilkie; Hunter Huff
- Producers: Alex Maxwell; Jake Angel

Chase Matthew singles chronology
"Love You Again" (2022)	"Darlin'" (2024)	"All My Exes" (2025)

Music video
- "Darlin'" on YouTube

"Darlin'" is a song by American country music singer Chase Matthew and the lead single from his third EP, We All Grow Up (2024). It was written by Matthew himself, Alex Maxwell, Ciaran Wilkie and Hunter Huff and produced by Maxwell and Jake Angel. The song became Matthew's first number-one in November 2025.

== Background ==
Chase Matthew was touring in Montana at the time that he composed the song with his band and co-writers. They had three days to spend freely and did not want to drive the bus back to Nashville, Tennessee, only to return again, so they stayed at a casino hotel. Matthew set up a mobile recording studio in a suite and wrote the song with his guitar player Ciaran Wilkie and lighting technician Hunter Huff. They wrote and recorded the track to an instrumental by Jake Angel from the United Kingdom. After returning to Nashville, they finished the track with Alex Maxwell, who fine-tuned it and handled the production on vocals.

== Composition and lyrics ==
The song consists of acoustic guitar and banjo, accompanied by a hip-hop beat. In the lyrics, Chase Matthew directs anger at his lover for cheating on him, as he discusses his suspicions and questions his partner about her relationship with the other man: "Why's he call you darlin'? Why's he call you daily? / Why you tryna act like I'm just out here being crazy? / How's he know your mama? Does he drive your Mercedes? / You can say whatever, baby, what you wanna call it? / But why's he call you darlin'? Yeah / And if he's just a friend, then tell me why's he always calling?"

== Music video ==
The music video sees Chase Matthew realizing that his girlfriend is cheating on him with another man after seeing her post a picture of them together, supposedly as "friends with benefits". Matthew performs the song with his band in a garage and records the performance as revenge.

Matthew worked with his frequent collaborator Wes Webb on the video. They came up with the concept only 12 hours before the shoot, when they were hanging out in the studio of Matthew's house at midnight. Matthew then called his band, asking them to come to his house in the morning. They called an audio engineer, a lighting technician, some extra helpers and friends from Nashville, and included the road crew in the filming process. The video also featured two young women that Matthew's videographer Kara Lewis had stumbled upon at a local gas station and invited to take part. The whole video was filmed by the night, on a Tuesday.

== Charts ==
=== Weekly charts ===
Weekly chart performance for "Darlin'"
Chart (2025)	Peak position
Australia Country Hot 50 (The Music)	10
Canada (Canadian Hot 100)	100
Canada Country (Billboard)	10
UK Country Airplay (Radiomonitor)	27
US Billboard Hot 100	52
US Country Airplay (Billboard)	1
US Hot Country Songs (Billboard)	13

=== Year-end charts ===
Year-end chart performance for "Darlin'"
Chart (2025)	Position
US Country Airplay (Billboard)	46
US Hot Country Songs (Billboard)	89

== Certifications ==
Region	Certification	Certified units/sales
Canada (Music Canada)	Gold	40,000^{‡}
United States (RIAA)	Gold	500,000^{‡}
^{‡} Sales+streaming figures based on certification alone.
