= Every Little Thing (Carly Pearce song) =

Single by Carly Pearce

from the album Every Little Thing
- Released: February 22, 2017
- Genre: Country
- Length: 3:03
- Label: Big Machine
- Songwriters: Carly Pearce; Emily Shackelton; busbee
- Producer: busbee

Carly Pearce singles chronology
"Wasn't That Drunk" (2016)	"Every Little Thing" (2017)	"Hide the Wine" (2017)

"Every Little Thing" is the debut single co-written and recorded by American country music singer Carly Pearce. After receiving airplay on SiriusXM's The Highway channel, the song was sent to country music radio in February 2017. Pearce wrote the song with Emily Shackelton and busbee, who also produced it.

== Content ==
AXS describes the song as "a rich musical composition, featuring piano, dobro, bass, cello and minor percussion".

== Critical reception ==
Taste of Country reviewed the song favorably, stating that Pearce "recalls some of country music’s most vulnerable female vocalists. The heartbreaking ballad is as raw as the singer’s emotions."

== Music video ==
The music video was directed by Patrick Tracy and premiered on CMT, GAC, and VEVO in March 2017.

== Commercial performance ==
The song was certified Gold by the RIAA on November 14, 2017. and has sold 393,000 copies in the United States as of November 2018.

== Charts ==
=== Weekly charts ===
Chart (2017)	Peak position
Canada Country (Billboard)	1
US Billboard Hot 100	50
US Country Airplay (Billboard)	1
US Hot Country Songs (Billboard)	5

=== Year-end charts ===
Chart (2017)	Position
Canada Country (Billboard)	49
US Country Airplay (Billboard)	16
US Hot Country Songs (Billboard)	19

== Certifications ==
Region	Certification	Certified units/sales
Canada (Music Canada)	2× Platinum	160,000^{‡}
United States (RIAA)	Platinum	1,000,000^{‡}
^{‡} Sales+streaming figures based on certification alone.
