= Chase Matthew =

American singer-songwriter (born 1997)

- Born: Chase Matthew McQuitty; December 20, 1997 (age 28); Sevierville, Tennessee, U.S.
- Origin: Nashville, Tennessee, U.S.
- Genre: Country
- Occupation: Singer-songwriter
- Instrument: Vocals
- Years active: 2019–present
- Labels: Holler Boy, Warner Nashville

Chase Matthew McQuitty (born December 20, 1997) is an American country music singer and songwriter. Signed to Warner Records Nashville, he has charted with the singles "Love You Again" and "Darlin'".

== Biography ==
Chase Matthew was born in Sevierville, Tennessee, grew up in Nashville, Tennessee but attended Gallatin High School and began recording music in his teenage years while also working as a mechanic. In 2021, country rap artist Upchurch heard some of Matthew's songs online and signed him to his Holler Boy label. Through Holler Boy, Matthew released the single "County Line" from the EP of the same name, followed by his debut album Born for This in 2022.

In October 2022, Matthew signed with Warner Records Nashville. The label released the album Come Get Your Memory, consisting of 25 songs, the following June. This was followed by the single "Love You Again". On November 10, 2023, he released his second EP Hey World Sessions.

On February 16, 2024, Matthew released his third EP We All Grow Up. The EP included his second country radio single "Darlin'".

On June 18, 2024, Matthew released the song "Saltwater Cinderella" and announced his fourth EP Always Be Mine. It was released on July 4, 2024. On January 17, 2025, Matthew released the song "Drives My Truck" and announced his third album Chase. It was released on February 21, 2025.

== Discography ==
=== Albums ===
List of albums, with selected peak chart positions
Title	Year	Peak chart positions
Title	Year	US Heat.
Born for This	Release date: February 11, 2022; Label: Holler Boy	2
Come Get Your Memory	Release date: June 9, 2023; Label: Warner Nashville	—
Chase	Released: February 21, 2025; Label: Warner Nashville	—

=== EPs ===
- County Line (2021)
- Hey World Sessions (2023)
- We All Grow Up (2024)
- Always Be Mine (2024)

=== Singles ===
==== As lead artist ====
List of singles, with selected peak chart positions
Title	Year	Peak chart positions					Certification	Album
Title	Year	US	US Country	US Country Airplay	CAN	CAN Country	Certification	Album
"County Line"	2021	—	—	—	—	—	RIAA: Platinum; MC: Gold	County Line
"Love You Again"	2023	91	24	9	—	40	RIAA: Platinum; MC: Gold	Come Get Your Memory
"Darlin'"	2024	52	13	1	100	10	RIAA: Gold; MC: Gold	We All Grow Up
"Holdin' It Down"	2026	—	—	16	—	—		TBA

==== As featured artist ====
Title	Year	Peak chart positions				Album
Title	Year	US	US Country	US Country Airplay	CAN Country	Album
"All My Exes" (Lauren Alaina featuring Chase Matthew)	2025	47	14	1	35	Stages
