= Every Little Thing (album) =

Studio album by Carly Pearce
- Released: October 13, 2017
- Recorded: 2016–2017
- Genre: Country
- Length: 42:43
- Label: Big Machine
- Producer: busbee

Carly Pearce chronology
Every Little Thing (2017)	Carly Pearce (2020)

Singles from Every Little Thing
- 1. "Every Little Thing" Released: February 22, 2017; 2. "Hide the Wine" Released: December 4, 2017

Every Little Thing is the debut studio album by American country music artist Carly Pearce. It was released on October 13, 2017.

== Reception ==
Professional ratings
Review scores
Source	Rating
AllMusic	4/5 stars

Stephen Thomas Erlewine of AllMusic considered the songs in the album "appealing" and that they "feel fresh in their melodies and observations." He thought that in the album "Pearce establishes her own identity: her showbiz and country roots are inextricably entangled, a singer with a feel for the past but an eye for the present". Matt Bjorke of Roughstock judged that there is depth in the lyrics of the songs in the album, depth in her "powerful vocal", and depth in the production that "allows for Carly to be the artist that she is".

Every Little Thing debuted at No. 4 on the Top Country Albums chart and No. 32 on the Billboard 200, selling 9,700 copies (15,000 equivalent album units including streams and track sales). Carly Pearce also reached No. 1 on the Emerging Artists Chart on the strength of the album release. The album has sold 39,000 copies in the United States as of November 2018.

== Singles ==
The album's lead single, the title track, was released to country radio on February 22, 2017. It became her first Number One hit on the Billboard Country Airplay charts on the week dated November 25, 2017.

The album's second single, "Hide the Wine," was released to country radio on December 4, 2017.

=== Promotional singles ===
"If My Name Was Whiskey" was released as the first official promotional single on June 23, 2017.

The second promotional single "Color" became available on Apple Music on September 15, 2017, and became available for all on September 16, 2017.

"I Need a Ride Home" was released as the third promotional single a week later, on September 22, 2017.

The album version of "Dare Ya", which was originally released in May, featuring a slightly different arrangement, was released as the fourth promotional single on September 29, 2017.

The final promotional single, "Hide the Wine", was released on October 6, 2017. Pearce said this is her favorite promotional single that she has released from the album.

== Track listing ==
Track listing adapted from The Boot.

No.	Title	Writer(s)	Length
1.	"Hide the Wine"	Ashley Gorley; Luke Laird; Hillary Lindsey	3:28
2.	"Careless"	Carly Pearce; Emily Shackelton	3:43
3.	"Every Little Thing"	Pearce; Shackelton; busbee	3:01
4.	"Everybody Gonna Talk"	Pearce; busbee; Emily Weisband	3:09
5.	"Catch Fire"	busbee; Natalie Hemby	3:13
6.	"If My Name Was Whiskey"	Pearce; busbee; Shane McAnally	3:17
7.	"Color"	Pearce; busbee; Laura Veltz	2:47
8.	"I Need a Ride Home"	Gorley; Lindsey; Matt Jenkins	3:32
9.	"Doin' It Right"	Pearce; Oscar Charles; Allison Veltz	2:46
10.	"Feel Somethin'"	busbee; Hemby; McAnally	3:26
11.	"You Know Where to Find Me"	Pearce; busbee; Shackelton	3:30
12.	"Honeysuckle"	busbee; Lindsey; Barry Dean	3:19
13.	"Dare Ya"	Pearce; A. Veltz; Joe Ginsberg	3:32
Total length:			42:43

== Personnel ==
Adapted from AllMusic

- Paul Barber - programming
- busbee - bass guitar, steel guitar, programming, synthesizer
- Joeie Canaday - bass guitar
- Eric Darken - percussion
- Ian Fitchuk - electric guitar, organ, piano, vibraphone
- Bobby Hamrick - background vocals
- Wes Hightower - background vocals
- Mark Hill - bass guitar
- Josh Matheny - dobro, steel guitar
- Carl Miner - banjo, acoustic guitar, mandolin
- Carly Pearce - lead vocals, background vocals
- Emily Shackleton - background vocals
- Aaron Sterling - drums, percussion
- Russell Terrell - background vocals
- Ilya Toshinsky - banjo, bouzouki, acoustic guitar, keyboards, mandolin, mellotron, Wurlitzer
- Allison Veltz - background vocals
- Laura Veltz - background vocals
- Derek Wells - electric guitar

== Charts ==
Chart (2017)	Peak position
Canadian Albums (Billboard)	77
US Billboard 200	32
US Top Country Albums (Billboard)	4
