= Eighteen Inches =

Single by Lauren Alaina

from the album Wildflower
- Released: July 16, 2012
- Recorded: 2011
- Genre: Country
- Length: 3:44
- Label: Mercury Nashville
- Songwriters: Ashley Gorley; Kelley Lovelace; Carrie Underwood
- Producer: Byron Gallimore

Lauren Alaina singles chronology
"Georgia Peaches" (2011)	"Eighteen Inches" (2012)	"Barefoot and Buckwild" (2013)

Music video
- "Eighteen Inches" (Lyric video) on YouTube

"Eighteen Inches" is a song written by Carrie Underwood, Ashley Gorley and Kelley Lovelace and recorded by American country music artist Lauren Alaina. It was released on July 16, 2012, as the third and final single from Alaina's debut album Wildflower.

== Content ==
"Eighteen Inches" is a story of two young lovers early in their relationship, with references to the space between a person’s head and heart.

One of the songwriter Ashley Gorley described the song as “A girl madly in love running away with her boyfriend, doing anything they could to scrape up the money and get a ring, and eventually deciding they were ‘ready’ for a baby. If they had stopped and thought about any of the scenarios, they never would have happened, but when you follow what you feel it can take you a long way” and he also said that the song was written a few years back for Carrie Underwood saying, “Carrie, Kelley Lovelace and I wrote this song a couple of years ago when we were writing for Carrie’s album,”

== Critical reception ==
It received three stars out of five rating from Billy Dukes of Taste of Country, who said "The plot is a little predictable, but mostly because it’s a story all of us know so well from personal experience. That’s where Alaina has room for growth. While it’s certainly not her fault that she’s never begged a landlord for one more week, her lack of expertise shows. She’s not a master storyteller yet — this tale sounds more like a really good one she heard from a friend, in this case songwriters Ashley Gorley, Kelley Lovelace and Carrie Underwood. The song’s sweet ending may overcome any issues of credibility, however."

== Track listing ==
Digital download

1. "Eighteen Inches" — 3:44

== Charts ==
Chart (2012)	Peak position
US Country Airplay (Billboard)	34
US Hot Country Songs (Billboard)	37

== Release history ==
Country	Date	Format
United States	July 16, 2012	Country Radio
