= Road Less Traveled (song) =

Single by Lauren Alaina

from the album Lauren Alaina and Road Less Traveled
- Released: July 11, 2016
- Recorded: Summer 2014
- Genre: Country rock
- Length: 3:36
- Label: Mercury Nashville; Interscope; 19
- Songwriters: Lauren Alaina; Jesse Frasure; Meghan Trainor
- Producer: busbee

Lauren Alaina singles chronology
"Next Boyfriend" (2015)	"Road Less Traveled" (2016)	"What Ifs" (2017)

Music video
- "Road Less Traveled" on YouTube

"Road Less Traveled" is a song recorded by American country music singer Lauren Alaina for her 2015 self-titled EP. Alaina co-wrote the song with Jesse Frasure and Meghan Trainor. It was released to country radio through Mercury Nashville and Interscope Records on June 27, 2016, as the EP's second single and officially impacted the format on July 11, 2016. The song is also included on her second studio album of the same name (2017), and serves as the record's second single.

The country rock song explores the concept of staying true to one's self despite insecurities and external pressures. Upon release, the song was praised by critics for its "anthemic" nature as well as Alaina's confidence. "Road Less Traveled" debuted at number 57 on the Billboard Country Airplay chart, and has since become Alaina's first number one single. It also charted at numbers 8 and 67 on both the Hot Country Songs and Hot 100 charts respectively. The song has sold 203,000 copies in the United States as of May 2017. It also charted in Canada, reaching number 3 on the Canada Country chart.

An accompanying music video for the song was directed by Chris Hicky.

The song won Alaina a CMT Award for Breakthrough Video of the Year in 2017.

== Background and recording ==
"Road Less Traveled" was written in 2013 by Lauren Alaina, Jesse Frasure and Meghan Trainor in Nashville, Tennessee. At the time, Alaina was dealing with the divorce of her parents, bulimia and her father going to rehab for alcoholism. She wanted to write an uplifting song that could inspire others going through similar struggles. Trainor was also experiencing insecurities about her figure at the time, telling Billboard in 2014 that she wanted to tell herself and others to "love yourself more". A discussion involving the Robert Frost poem "The Road Not Taken" led the co-writers to land on "Road Less Traveled" as their title. They then wrote the chorus and the hook, "take the road less traveled on," first, which is extremely similar to Berlin's "Take My Breath Away."

The demo was recorded using entirely programmed instrumentation. Busbee, who serves as the record's producer, sought to blend the synthesized instruments with authentic ones to create a soundscape that is radio-friendly but in tune with the song's message. Vocals were recorded in the summer of 2014. Alaina underwent vocal surgery on August 12, 2014 and re-recorded the lead vocals on the song after her recovery. Her vocal range expanded after her surgery with Alaina hitting a big note during the song's bridge that she struggled to reach prior.

== Composition ==
"Road Less Traveled" is a country rock song which runs for a duration of three minutes and thirty-six seconds. It begins with a banjo played in a "pinging" lick accompanied by hand clapping and an "insistent" kick drum. Musically, the track follows a "four-on-the-floor" beat accentuated by two banjos and a mandolin "twisting" around a "spacey" synth line. Producer busbee aimed to blend authentic instrumentation with synthetic sounds for a blend of country and pop styles.

Lyrically, the song is about "feeling good in your own skin" and speaks to a journey of self-acceptance. The titular lyrics were inspired by the popular Robert Frost poem, "The Road Not Taken", in which the narrator chooses a "road less traveled" at a fork in the road. Self-image is addressed in the first verse with references to dress sizes and Alaina imploring the listener not to "let the world decide what's beautiful," alluding to Alaina's own previous struggles with body image. Other lyrics emphasize the importance of staying true to yourself, or "march[ing] to the rhythm of a different drum" and "just own[ing] it". Critics have labelled the song an "anthem" for its empowering message comparing it to Martina McBride's "This One's for the Girls" and co-writer Meghan Trainor's "All About That Bass".

== Critical reception ==
Billy Dukes of Taste of Country wrote that Alaina "has never sounded more confident" in his "Critic's Pick" review of the single. In particular, Dukes praised the singer's approach to the "anthemic" and "uplifting" message. In a review of the EP, Jason Scott of PopDust complimented the "undeniable" songwriting on "Road Less Traveled" and deemed the track "one of her most alluring performances ever".

== Commercial performance ==
"Road Less Traveled" debuted at number 57 on the Billboard Country Airplay chart dated September 3, 2016. The following week, the song experienced a significant gain in airplay and audience, due in part to Alaina's selection as the iHeartRadio "On the Verge" artist, which guarantees airplay on the brand's affiliated stations. As a result, the song jumped to 28 on the chart dated September 10, 2016, thereby tying "Road Less Traveled" with 2012's "Georgia Peaches" as Alaina's highest-charting song. It has since reached a peak position of number 1, making it her highest-charting single to date and first number one. The song has sold an estimated 220,000 copies in the US as of July 2017.

In Canada, the song debuted at number 50 on the Country airplay chart dated October 15, 2016, earning Alaina her first entry on the chart.

== Live performances ==
Alaina appeared on The Today Show on September 8, 2016, to perform the song in its television debut.

She also performed the song at the 2017 CMT Awards.

On August 14, 2025, Alaina performed the song with Elmo at The Grand Ole Opry.

== Music video and movie ==
The music video was directed by Chris Hicky and premiered in October 2016. The video won her Breakthrough Video of the Year at the 2017 CMT Music Awards.

In May 2017, Lauren released a new trailer for the film Road Less Traveled based on the song. It features the songs "Road Less Traveled,"" Doin' Fine," "My Kinda People," "Painting Pillows," "Holding the Other," and "Queen of Hearts."

== Charts ==
=== Weekly charts ===
Chart (2016–2017)	Peak position
Canada Country (Billboard)	3
US Billboard Hot 100	67
US Country Airplay (Billboard)	1
US Hot Country Songs (Billboard)	8

=== Year-end charts ===
Chart (2016)	Position
US Hot Country Songs (Billboard)	98

Chart (2017)	Position
US Country Airplay (Billboard)	25
US Hot Country Songs (Billboard)	47

== Release history ==
Country	Date	Format	Label	Ref.
Various	October 2, 2015	Digital download (as part of Lauren Alaina EP)	19	
United States	June 28, 2016	Radio premiere (via PlayMPE)	Mercury Nashville; Interscope	
United States	July 11, 2016	Country radio	Mercury Nashville; Interscope	

== Certifications ==
Region	Certification	Certified units/sales
United States (RIAA)	Platinum	1,000,000^{‡}
^{‡} Sales+streaming figures based on certification alone.
