= Getting Good =

Single by Lauren Alaina

from the EP Getting Good and the album Sitting Pretty on Top of the World
- Released: October 7, 2019
- Genre: Country
- Length: 3:21
- Label: Mercury Nashville; 19
- Songwriter: Emily Weisband
- Producer: David Garcia

Lauren Alaina singles chronology
"Ladies in the '90s" (2018)	"Getting Good" (2019)	"One Beer" (2020)

Music video
- "Getting Good" on YouTube

"Getting Good" is a song recorded by American country music singer Lauren Alaina. It was released on October 7, 2019 as the second single from her EP of the same name, and the version with Trisha Yearwood was later included on the tracklisting for her third studio album, Sitting Pretty on Top of the World (2021).

== Content ==
"Getting Good" was written by Emily Weisband and produced by David Garcia.

A new version of the song, recorded as a duet with Trisha Yearwood, was released on June 26, 2020.

== Music video ==
The music video for "Getting Good" premiered on November 26, 2019. Directed by TK McKamy/Roman White, it features Alaina dancing a choreographed routine with her Dancing with the Stars partner Gleb Savchenko around an empty house. It also shows her by herself in certain scenes, such as barefoot by the pool and laying down on a new car.

== Charts ==
=== Weekly charts ===
Chart (2019–2020)	Peak position
US Country Airplay (Billboard)	29
US Hot Country Songs (Billboard)	33

=== Year-end charts ===
Chart (2020)	Position
US Hot Country Songs (Billboard)	75

== Certifications ==
Region	Certification	Certified units/sales
United States (RIAA)	Gold	500,000^{‡}
^{‡} Sales+streaming figures based on certification alone.

== Release history ==
Region	Date	Format	Version	Label
United States	September 27, 2019	Digital download	Original	Mercury Nashville
United States	October 7, 2019	Country radio	Original	Mercury Nashville
United States	June 26, 2020	Digital download	Duet with Trisha Yearwood	Mercury Nashville
