= Vedera =

American rock band

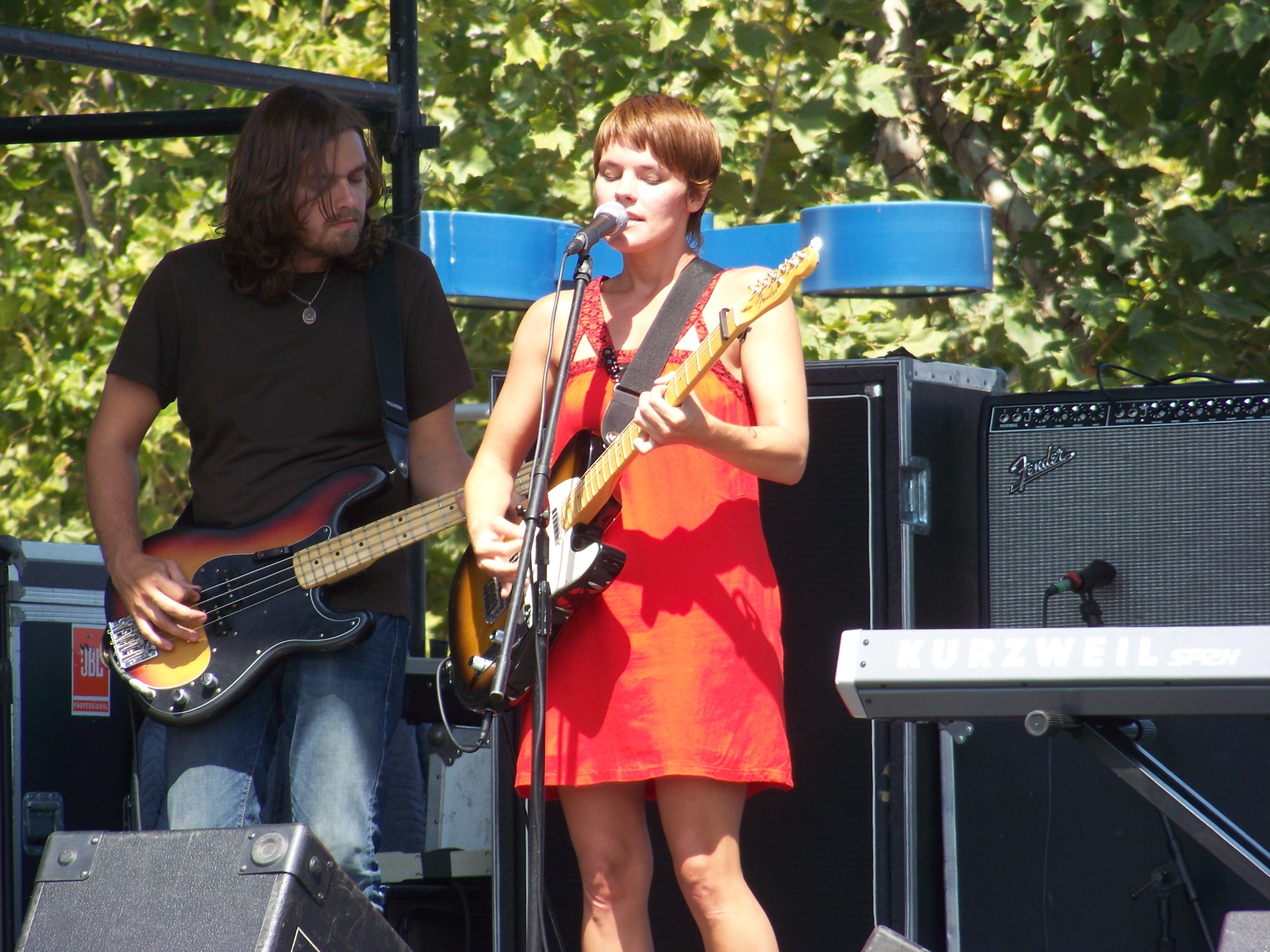
- Vedera performing in 2008

Background information
- Genres: Indie rock; art rock
- Years active: 2004–2011
- Labels: Second Nature; Epic
- Past members: Kristen May; Brian Little; Jason Douglas; Drew Little

Vedera (formerly Veda) was an American indie rock band from Kansas City, Missouri. The band was founded as Veda in 2003 by members Kristen May, Brian Little, Jason Douglas and Drew Little. They released The Weight of an Empty Room, their first full length LP in 2005. That year, they changed their name to Vedera after a similarly named band pursued litigation against them.

After signing to Epic Records in 2007, Vedera toured with The All-American Rejects and The Fray. Stages, their first studio album, was released in 2009 and peaked at No. 2 on the Billboard Heatseekers chart. Vedera disbanded in 2011.

== History ==
The band members all grew up the Kansas City suburb of Blue Springs, Missouri. Kristen May was born into a musical family and her mother introduced her to the work of Joni Mitchell, Carole King, and Jim Croce. When May was 17, her father, a drummer, gave her a guitar and she began writing her own songs.

Meanwhile, Brian Little's father gave his son his first guitar at age 13 and Little played in bands throughout high school. May and Little knew each other in high school and began playing in a band together called, Red Authentic, after May returned home following an aborted stint at college in Nashville. "I didn't want to study music anymore, I just wanted to play it", she said.

In 2003, the band she had formed with her brothers needed a guitarist and they called on Little. However, with her brothers unable to tour, May and Little asked Little's younger brother Drew and high school friend Jason Douglas to join. The band was renamed "Veda".

=== Veda to Vedera ===
In the summer of 2004, Veda recorded its six-song EP, This Broken City, at Black Lodge with the support of Ed Rose. In 2005, the band released an LP entitled The Weight of an Empty Room.

In early December 2005, Veda's label, Second Nature Recordings, announced that the band had been forced to change its name from "Veda" to "Vedera" to avoid confusion with the band Vaeda, whose name was pronounced the same way.

Beginning in the summer of 2005, Vedera toured with Dredg, MewithoutYou, Communiqué, Thrice, Mae, and Underoath. In early January 2006, Vedera went on a 40 city tour opening for Mutemath, followed by an opening stint for Owen. In the Summer of 2006, Vedera joined a tour with Lucero and Murder By Death. After a month off, they headed back on the road for another tour with Mae and The New Amsterdams. Kristen May and Brian Little subsequently married.

In 2007, Vedera signed to Epic Records and were featured on the hit T.V. show, The Hills. They were also featured on iTunes and played their single "Satisfy" on Ellen. May also sang with the lead singer of The All American Rejects and Jason Mraz while they were touring with them. Vedera opened for Eisley on their Combinations tour in early 2008. In early 2009 Vedera opened for The Fray on their club tour and also performed in the spring with The All-American Rejects on the I Wanna Rock tour.

=== Stages ===
Recording of their album Stages began October 17, 2007. It was released online on October 6, 2009. The album charted well, reaching No. 2 on the Top Heatseekers chart and No. 146 on the Billboard 200 that year.

May said that Stages is about "our blood, sweat, and tears over the past five years as a band on the road." Vedera recorded Stages with Epic Records A&R executive Mike Flynn, who co-produced the Fray's double-platinum album How to Save a Life and Augustana's 2008 album Can't Love, Can't Hurt, and Producer/Engineer Warren Huart (The Fray, Augustana, Howie Day).

=== Breakup ===
In 2011, Vedera disbanded and announced that May and Brian would be working together on May's new solo album.

On October 22, 2012, it was announced that May had joined the band Flyleaf as lead vocalist, replacing vocalist Lacey Sturm until the band's hiatus in 2016 following her departure.

== Band members ==
- Kristen May – vocals, guitar, piano
- Brian Little – lead guitar
- Jason Douglas – bass guitar
- Drew Little – drums

== Discography ==
- 2004: This Broken City
- 2005: The Weight of an Empty Room
- 2009: Stages
