= The Weight of an Empty Room =

Studio album by Veda
- Released: July 26, 2005
- Recorded: 2004–2005
- Genre: Indie rock
- Length: 49:47
- Label: Second Nature

Veda chronology
This Broken City (2004)	The Weight of an Empty Room (2005)	Stages (2008)

Professional ratings
Review scores
Source	Rating
AllMusic	3.5/5 stars
Exclaim!	Get it
Punknews.org	5/5 stars

The Weight of an Empty Room is the first full album produced by the American indie rock band Vedera (formerly Veda). The album was released on July 26, 2005.

== Track listing ==
1. "Trade This Fear" – 3:55
2. "Song for a Friend" – 3:36
3. "The Falling Kind" – 3:36
4. "Lover's Lie" – 3:20
5. "Desire on Repeat" – 3:54
6. "In the Quiet" – 3:37
7. "It's All Happening on Broadway" – 3:36
8. "Still Standing" – 3:44
9. "Redemption Soon" – 4:41
10. "Moments Rewound" – 3:56
11. "Safe" – 4:05
12. "Song Four, Side Two" – 4:05
13. "Lover's Lie (acoustic)" – 3:42
