= Next Boyfriend =

Single by Lauren Alaina

from the album Lauren Alaina and Road Less Traveled
- Released: September 18, 2015
- Genre: Country pop
- Length: 3:11
- Label: Mercury Nashville; 19; Interscope
- Songwriters: Lauren Alaina; Emily Weisband; Matt McVaney
- Producer: busbee

Lauren Alaina singles chronology
"Barefoot and Buckwild" (2013)	"Next Boyfriend" (2015)	"Road Less Traveled" (2016)

Music video
- "Next Boyfriend" on YouTube

"Next Boyfriend" is a song by American country music singer Lauren Alaina. It is the first single from her 2015 self-titled EP and her second studio album, Road Less Traveled.

== Critical reception ==
According to Jen Swirsky from Nashville Gab, "The song can aptly be described as flirtatiously sexy, while still remaining age appropriate and youth friendly for Lauren's wide array of fans. With a comparatively explosive chorus that demonstrates Lauren's broad vocal range, the quick-witted girl with adorable stage presence and endless humorous quips explains to the man who has caught her attention why he should head her way." One Stop Country states, "This song allows Alaina the chance to re-introduce herself, while also showing her growth and maturity as an artist and songwriter, but she smartly still maintains her youthful sound and age-appropriate lyrics."

== Track listing ==
Digital download

1. "Next Boyfriend" – 3:11

== Music video ==
The music video was directed by TK McKamy and premiered in January 2016.

== Chart performance ==
The song debuted on the Hot Country Songs chart at No. 39, with 10,000 copies sold in its first week of release.

Chart (2015–16)	Peak position
US Country Airplay (Billboard)	43
US Hot Country Songs (Billboard)	39

== Release history ==
Region	Date	Format	Label
North America	September 18, 2015	Digital download	19 Recordings
North America	September 28, 2015	Country radio	Mercury Nashville; Interscope Records
