= Like My Mother Does =

Single by Lauren Alaina

from the album Wildflower
- Released: May 25, 2011
- Recorded: 2011
- Genre: Country
- Length: 4:07
- Label: 19 Recordings; Mercury Nashville
- Songwriters: Nathan Chapman; Liz Rose; Nikki Williams
- Producer: Byron Gallimore

Lauren Alaina singles chronology
"Like My Mother Does" (2011)	"Georgia Peaches" (2011)

Music video
- "Like My Mother Does" on YouTube

"Like My Mother Does" is a song written by Nathan Chapman, Liz Rose, and Nikki Williams. It was first recorded by American country music artist Kristy Lee Cook from her 2008 album, Why Wait. It was later recorded and released as a single by country music singers Jesse Lee and Lauren Alaina in 2010 and 2011, respectively. Alaina's recording became the first version of the song to chart; it debuted at number 49 on the U.S. Billboard Hot Country Songs chart, and later reached a peak of number 36 on the chart in October 2011.

== Content ==
"Like My Mother Does" became the debut single and potential coronation song of American recording artist and American Idol's season 10 runner-up, Lauren Alaina.

It was first performed on May 24, 2011 American Idol final performance show and it was well-received on the show - judge Randy Jackson said "I love how at the end it was the Lauren we grew to love in Nashville", Jennifer Lopez said "It was a tight race, but with that song you may have just won" and Steven Tyler said "America will find it to be true, you're it in my eyes".

After the final performance show, her recording of "Like My Mother Does" was released as a single on May 25, 2011.

Alaina continued the promotion of the song by performing it during her Grand Ole Opry debut on June 10, 2011.

== Music video ==
The music video premiered on August 8, 2011 on CMT. The video is set in a country house with Alaina in different rooms singing the song, while different photos and home videos are shown of her growing up. The video goes from when she was little until now, with her mother always by her side. Her mother makes an appearance in the video as well.

== Track listing ==
Digital download
No.	Title	Length
1.	"Like My Mother Does" (American Idol Performance)	4:12

== Charts ==
Chart (2011)	Peak position
Canada Hot 100 (Billboard)	50
Canada Country (Billboard)	48
US Billboard Hot 100	20
US Hot Country Songs (Billboard)	36

== Certifications ==
Region	Certification	Certified units/sales
United States (RIAA)	Gold	500,000^{‡}
^{‡} Sales+streaming figures based on certification alone.

== Release history ==
Country	Date	Format	Label
United States	May 25, 2011	Digital download	19 Recordings, Inc
