= Who We Are (Flyleaf EP) =

EP by Flyleaf
- Released: July 9, 2013
- Length: 15:01
- Label: A&M Octone, Polydor
- Producer: Howard Benson, Omar Castro

Flyleaf chronology
New Horizons (2012)	Who We Are (2013)	Between the Stars (2014)

Singles from Who We Are
- 1. "Something Better" Released: July 4, 2013

Professional ratings
Review scores
Source	Rating
Indie Vision Music	3/5 stars
Jesus Freak Hideout	3/5 stars

Who We Are is an EP by American rock band Flyleaf and released on July 9, 2013. Who We Are is the first Flyleaf release to feature lead vocalist, Kristen May. "Something Better" is the band's first new song with May.

== Track listing ==
Live tracks from Winter 2013 tour with Drowning Pool.

No.	Title	Length
1.	"Something Better" (featuring Sonny Sandoval of P.O.D.)	3:05
2.	"Call You Out" (live)	2:30
3.	"Fire Fire" (live)	3:10
4.	"Broken Wings" (live)	3:23
5.	"Sorrow" (live)	2:52
6.	"Mama" (iTunes Exclusive Track)	3:49
Total length:		15:01

Bonus tracks
No.	Title	Length
6.	"Great Love" (live)	3:53
7.	"Cage on the Ground" (live)	3:31
Total length:		22:25

== Personnel ==
Flyleaf

- Sameer Bhattacharya – lead guitar, backing vocals
- James Culpepper – drums, percussion, timpani, and wind chimes
- Jared Hartmann – rhythm guitar
- Pat Seals – bass, backing vocals
- Kristen May – lead vocals

Additional personnel

- Sonny Sandoval – guest vocals on "Something Better"

Production

- Howard Benson – producer
- Omar Castro – producer

== Charts ==
Chart (2013)	Peak position
US Christian Albums (Billboard)	35
