= Wildflower (Lauren Alaina album) =

Studio album by Lauren Alaina
- Released: October 11, 2011
- Recorded: 2011
- Genre: Country
- Length: 44:33
- Labels: Mercury Nashville; Interscope; 19
- Producer: Byron Gallimore

Lauren Alaina chronology
American Idol Season 10 Highlights: Lauren Alaina (2011)	Wildflower (2011)	Lauren Alaina (2015)

Singles from Wildflower
- 1. "Like My Mother Does" Released: May 25, 2011; 2. "Georgia Peaches" Released: October 24, 2011; 3. "Eighteen Inches" Released: July 16, 2012

Wildflower is the debut studio album by season ten American Idol runner-up Lauren Alaina. The album was released on October 11, 2011, by Mercury Nashville. The album's first single, "Like My Mother Does", reached the Top 40 on the Billboard Hot Country Songs chart. Wildflower debuted at number five on the US Billboard 200 chart, making Alaina the youngest female artist to debut that high since LeAnn Rimes' debut album, Blue, fifteen years prior.

== Reception ==
Professional ratings
Aggregate scores
Source	Rating
Metacritic	(72/100)
Review scores
Source	Rating
AllMusic	3/5 stars
Country Weekly	3.5/5 stars
Entertainment Weekly	B
The New York Times	Positive

Wildflower received positive reviews from music critics. At Metacritic, which assigns a normalized rating out of 100 to reviews from mainstream critics, the album received an average score of 72, based on 4 reviews, which indicates "generally favorable reviews". AllMusic writer Stephen Thomas Erlewine gave the album 3 stars out of 5 and wrote: "Byron Gallimore, who previously produced Sugarland and Faith Hill, gives Wildflower an appealing gloss that helps disguise the ordinariness of the material along with any of Alaina's shortcomings, and that slickness serves Wildflower well, making it a much more enjoyable piece of product than McCreery's Clear as Day". The New York Times gave a very positive review to the album and said: "It works, not only because Ms. Alaina has a big voice, but also because she doesn't portray herself as an aw-shucks beginner. She's skipped that step, and rightly so". Melissa Maerz of Entertainment Weekly was also positive on the album and gave it a "B" and said: "On Wildflower, she captures the restless spirit of small-town girls who get grounded for French-kissing the boy next door". Jessica Nicholson of Country Weekly gave the album 3 and half stars out of 5 and noted: "Despite the album's title, she plays it safe rather than wild".

== Track listing ==
No.	Title	Writer(s)	Length
1.	"Georgia Peaches"	Blair Daly; Mallary Hope; Rachel Proctor	3:07
2.	"Growing Her Wings"	Nicolle Galyon; Nicole Witt	3:01
3.	"Tupelo"	Hillary Lindsey; Steve McEwan; Gordie Sampson	3:39
4.	"The Middle"	Zac Maloy; Proctor; David Hodges	3:56
5.	"Like My Mother Does"	Nathan Chapman; Liz Rose; Nikki Williams	4:07
6.	"She's a Wildflower"	Lindsey; McEwan; Sampson	3:38
7.	"I'm Not One of Them"	Tony Martin; Tom Shapiro; Sarah Johns	3:18
8.	"The Locket"	Hope	5:10
9.	"Eighteen Inches"	Ashley Gorley; Kelley Lovelace; Carrie Underwood	3:44
10.	"One of Those Boys"	Marla Cannon-Goodman; Benjamin Caver; Anthony L. Smith	2:42
11.	"Funny Thing About Love"	Lauren Alaina; Brett James; Luke Laird	3:57
12.	"Dirt Road Prayer"	Galyon; April Geesbreght	4:14
Total length:			44:33

== Personnel ==
- Lauren Alaina - lead vocals
- Charlie Bisharat - fiddle
- Perry Coleman - background vocals
- Dan Dugmore - dobro, steel guitar
- Stuart Duncan - fiddle, mandolin
- Shannon Forrest - drums, percussion
- Larry Franklin - fiddle
- Paul Franklin - steel guitar
- Byron Gallimore - electric guitar, keyboards
- Lisa Gregg - background vocals
- Tania Hancheroff - background vocals
- Troy Lancaster - acoustic guitar, electric guitar
- Pat McGrath - banjo, acoustic guitar, resonator guitar, mandolin
- Jerry McPherson - electric guitar
- Kenny LeMasters - steel guitar
- Brent Mason - electric guitar
- Jamie Muhoberac - keyboards
- Steve Nathan - keyboards, organ, piano
- Jeannette Olsson - background vocals
- Michael Thompson - electric guitar
- Lonnie Wilson - drums, drum loops, percussion
- Glenn Worf - bass guitar
- Craig Young - bass guitar
- Chris "Tek" O'Ryan - sound engineer

== Chart performance ==
The album debuted at No. 5 on the Billboard 200 with 69,000 copies sold. It has sold 303,000 copies in the United States as of January 2013.

=== Weekly charts ===
Chart (2011)	Peak position
Canadian Albums (Billboard)	22
US Billboard 200	5
US Top Country Albums (Billboard)	2

=== Year-end charts ===
Chart (2011)	Position
US Top Country Albums (Billboard)	47
Chart (2012)	Position
US Top Country Albums (Billboard)	34
