= What Ifs =

Single by Kane Brown featuring Lauren Alaina

from the album Kane Brown
- Released: February 6, 2017
- Genre: Country
- Length: 3:08
- Label: RCA Nashville
- Songwriter(s): Kane Brown; Matt McGinn; Jordan Schmidt
- Producer(s): Dann Huff

Kane Brown singles chronology
"Thunder in the Rain" (2016)	"What Ifs" (2017)	"Heaven" (2017)

Lauren Alaina singles chronology
"Road Less Traveled" (2016)	"What Ifs" (2017)	"Doin' Fine" (2017)

Music video
- "What ifs" on YouTube

"What Ifs" is a song recorded by American singer Kane Brown featuring fellow American singer Lauren Alaina for Brown's self-titled debut album. The song was released with the album through RCA Nashville and was serviced to radio as the second single on February 6, 2017.

== Background ==
The song was written by Brown with Matt McGinn and Jordan Schmidt. The song is about a couple where the question "what if" is asked repeatedly about what would happen in their relationship. It features a duet with Lauren Alaina, a school friend from Lakeview Fort Oglethorpe High School when he was living in Fort Oglethorpe, Georgia. According to Brown, the song was initially not intended to be a duet, he said: "Once we decided on adding a woman to "What Ifs," I knew that I wanted Lauren to sing it, and, of course, she killed it." According to Brown, another song was going to be used in the album, however, he was asked so much about "What Ifs" on social media that it was then decided that the song should be included in the album.

== Composition ==
The song is in the key of G minor with a moderately fast tempo of approximately 126 beats per minute. It follows the chord progression Gm-B♭-F. Brown's vocals range from F_{2}-B♭_{4}.

== Chart performance ==
"What Ifs" sold 6,000 downloads in the US the week the album was released on December 2, 2016, allowing it to chart at number 37 on the US Hot Country Songs chart. The song first entered the US Country Airplay chart for the week of March 4, 2017 at number 60. It reached number one on Hot Country Songs in October 2017, ending the record breaking 34-week reign of Sam Hunt's "Body Like a Back Road". The song is the first number one on the chart for both Brown and Alaina. The following week, for the chart dated October 28, 2017, "What Ifs" stayed at number one, as well as topped the Country Airplay and Country Streaming Songs charts, becoming Alaina's second number one on the former chart after her solo single, "Road Less Traveled", topped the chart earlier in the year. Together with the release of the deluxe edition of the album which also reached number on Top Country Albums, and another number one for a new track "Heaven" on digital sales, Brown became the first artist to have simultaneous number ones on all five main country charts.

The single became the third most-consumed country song of 2017, with 1,551,000 units including streams (599,000 in pure sales) sold in the year. As of January 2019, the single has sold 889,000 copies in the US. On February 26, 2025, the single was certified Diamond by the Recording Industry Association of America (RIAA) for combined sales and streaming equivalent units of over ten million units in the United States.

== Music video ==
The official music video for the song was directed by P. R. Brown and produced by Steve Lamar. The video was filmed along the Californian coast at The Inn at Newport Ranch, a resort and cattle ranch to the north of San Francisco. It features Brown and his duet partner Lauren Alaina singing along the coast. It was released on May 14, 2017. An earlier lyric video was first released on May 4, 2017, and shows Brown and Alaina cruising down a road.

== Charts ==
=== Weekly charts ===
Chart (2017)	Peak position
Canada (Canadian Hot 100)	45
Canada Country (Billboard)	3
US Billboard Hot 100	26
US Country Airplay (Billboard)	1
US Hot Country Songs (Billboard)	1

=== Year-end charts ===
Chart (2017)	Position
US Billboard Country Airplay	7
US Billboard Hot Country Songs	4
US Billboard Hot 100	72

Chart (2018)	Position
US Hot Country Songs (Billboard)	37

=== Decade-end charts ===
Chart (2010–2019)	Position
US Hot Country Songs (Billboard)	6

== Certifications ==
Region	Certification	Certified units/sales
Australia (ARIA)	2× Platinum	140,000^{‡}
Canada (Music Canada)	6× Platinum	480,000^{‡}
New Zealand (RMNZ)	Gold	15,000^{‡}
United States (RIAA)	Diamond	10,000,000^{‡}
^{‡} Sales+streaming figures based on certification alone.
