= Barefoot and Buckwild =

Single by Lauren Alaina
- Released: May 7, 2013
- Recorded: 2013
- Genre: Country pop
- Length: 2:53
- Label: Mercury Nashville/19
- Songwriters: Lauren Alaina, Chris DeStefano, Jon Nite
- Producer: Chris DeStefano

Lauren Alaina singles chronology
"Eighteen Inches" (2012)	"Barefoot and Buckwild" (2013)	"Next Boyfriend" (2015)

"Barefoot and Buckwild" is a song by American country music singer Lauren Alaina. The song was written by Alaina with Chris DeStefano and Jon Nite. It was released on May 7, 2013 through Mercury Nashville and 19 Recordings as a standalone single.

== Background and release ==
"Barefoot and Buckwild" was initially intended as the first single from her second studio album, Road Less Traveled (2017), which was at the time untitled and tentatively scheduled for release at the end of 2013. However, following the song's disappointing performance on the charts and Alaina's vocal surgery in the summer of 2014, Alaina restarted the recording process for the album and the song was ultimately left off the album's final tracklisting.

== Live performances ==
Alaina debuted the song on the Top 3 result show of American Idol season 12 on May 9, 2013.

== Critical reception ==
Billy Dukes of Taste of Country gave the song four stars out of five, writing that it is "sassy and sexy without being too risque for a teenager. It's flirty, but not Snooki-level flirty. Most importantly the uptempo, pop-country track is a ton of fun." Matt Bjorke of Roughstock gave the song four stars out of five, saying that it "has a lot of attitudes but not so much that Lauren loses any sense of that charming cuteness that brought her to the forefront in the place."

== Chart performance ==
"Barefoot and Buckwild" debuted at number 34 on the U.S. Billboard Hot Country Songs chart for the week of May 25, 2013. It sold 19,000 paid digital downloads in its first week of release. "Barefoot and Buckwild" also debuted at number 58 on the U.S. Billboard Country Airplay chart for the week of July 20, 2013.

Chart (2013)	Peak position
US Hot Country Songs (Billboard)	34
US Country Airplay (Billboard)	56

== Release history ==
Country	Date	Format
United States	May 7, 2013	Country radio
United States	May 7, 2013	Digital download
