= Georgia Peaches =

Single by Lauren Alaina

from the album Wildflower
- Released: October 24, 2011
- Recorded: 2011
- Genre: Country
- Length: 3:07
- Label: Mercury Nashville
- Songwriters: Blair Daly; Mallary Hope; Rachel Proctor
- Producer: Byron Gallimore

Lauren Alaina singles chronology
"Like My Mother Does" (2011)	"Georgia Peaches" (2011)	"Eighteen Inches" (2012)

Music video
- "Georgia Peaches" on YouTube

"Georgia Peaches" is a song written by Blair Daly, Mallary Hope and Rachel Proctor, and recorded by American country music artist Lauren Alaina. It was released on October 24, 2011, as the second single from her debut album Wildflower.

== Critical reception ==
Giving it 4 out of 5 stars, Billy Dukes of Taste of Country said that it "seems custom built for Alaina's mischievous — yet still wholesome — personality. It's cute without being sexy."

Matt Bjorke of Roughstock gave it an identical rating, saying that it "brings attitude and tempo to the party and immediately showcases Lauren Alaina has the goods to be a big star in country music."

== Music video ==
The music video premiered on January 6, 2012.

== Live performances ==
Alaina performed the single live on the March 9, 2012, episode of American Idol.

== Charts ==
Chart (2011–2012)	Peak position
US Hot Country Songs (Billboard)	28
