= Stages (Vedera album) =

Studio album by Vedera
- Released: October 6, 2009
- Recorded: 2007–2008
- Genre: Indie rock, alternative rock, indie pop
- Length: 51:23
- Label: Epic
- Producer: Mike Flynn and Warren Huart

Vedera chronology
The Weight of an Empty Room (2005)	Stages (2009)

Stages is the second and final album from American rock band Vedera. It was released digitally on Epic Records on October 6, 2009. The album was produced by Mike Flynn and Warren Huart (The Fray, Augustana). Rough cuts of "Back to the Middle," "Satisfy," "Forgive You," and "Taking Chances" have been made available on the band's MySpace page. The album and few songs have gotten most of its major popularity after the band was featured on an episode of MTV's The Hills.

== Track listing ==
1. "Greater Than" – 3:37
2. "Loving Ghosts" – 4:40
3. "Satisfy" – 3:21
4. "Forgive You" – 3:08
5. "Goodbye My Love" – 3:26
6. "Back To The Middle" – 3:45
7. "Even I" – 3:58
8. "A World Apart" – 3:58
9. "Look Around" – 3:52
10. "If You Go" – 3:46
11. "The Rain" – 4:57
12. "We Sing" – 4:16
13. "Move Forward" (iTunes exclusive) - 5:05

== Chart performances ==
=== Album ===
Chart (2010)	Peak position
US Billboard Top Heatseekers	2

=== Singles ===
Year	Single	Peak positions
Year	Single	Adult Pop Songs
2010	"Satisfy"	36
