= Emily Shackelton =

Emily Shackelton is an American musician and songwriter.

She co-wrote "Every Little Thing" which was a number one hit for Carly Pearce in 2017. She has written songs recorded by Sara Evans, Reba McEntire, Mickey Guyton, Cassadee Pope, and Lauren Alaina.
