= Lauren Alaina =

American singer & songwriter (born 1994)

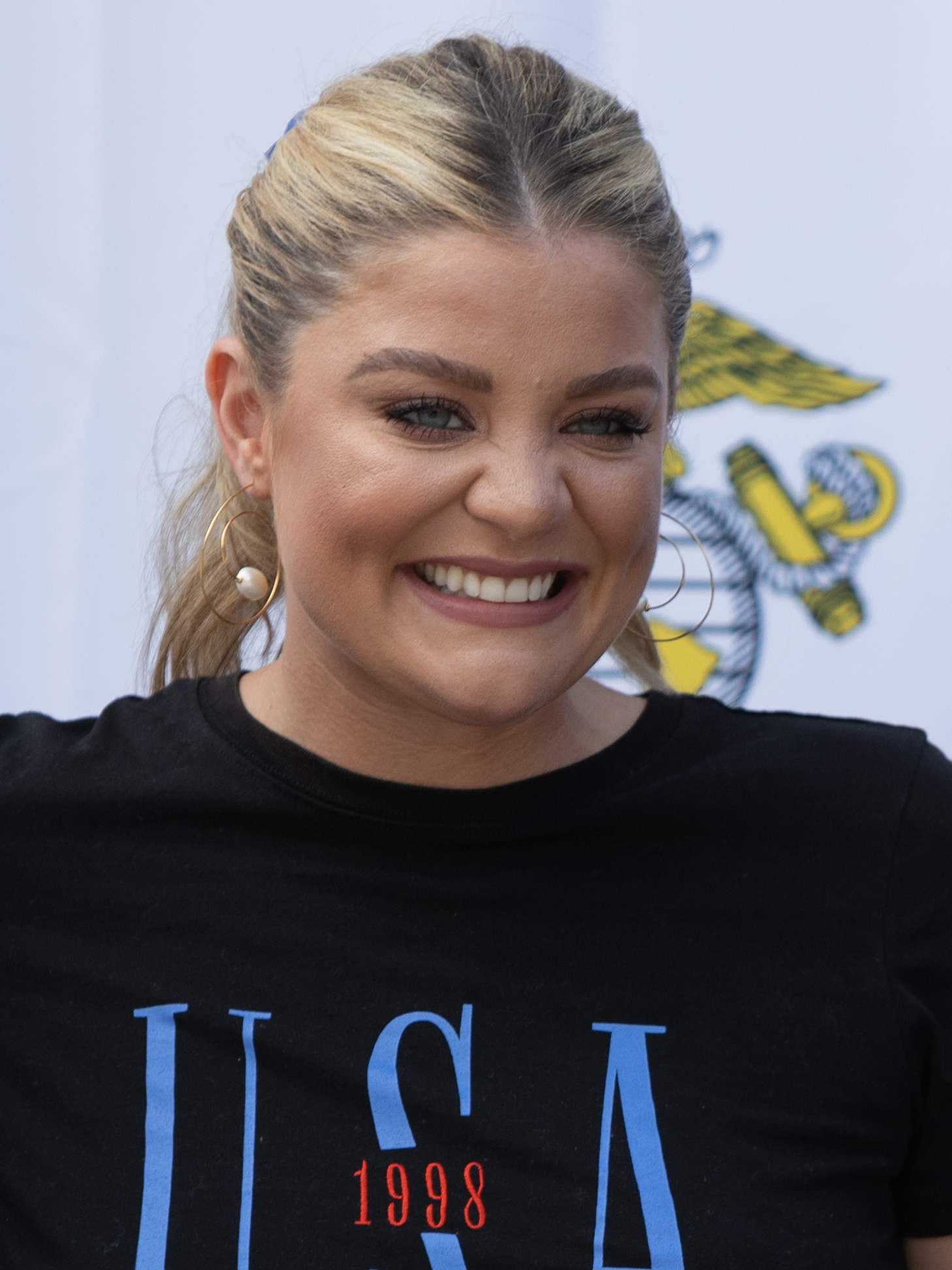
- Alaina in 2023

Background information
- Born: Lauren Alaina Kristine Suddeth; November 8, 1994 (age 32); Rossville, Georgia, U.S.
- Genres: Country; country pop
- Occupations: Singer; songwriter
- Instruments: Vocals; guitar
- Years active: 2011–present
- Labels: 19; Interscope; Mercury Nashville; Big Loud
- Spouse: Cam Arnold (m. 2024)
- Website: laurenalainaofficial.com

Lauren Alaina Kristine Arnold (born November 8, 1994) is an American singer and songwriter from Rossville, Georgia. She was the runner-up on the tenth season of American Idol, losing to Scotty McCreery. Her debut studio album, Wildflower, was released on October 11, 2011. Her second album, Road Less Traveled, was released January 27, 2017. Alaina later achieved her first number one on the Country Airplay chart with the album's title track. Her second number one came later that year when she simultaneously topped five Billboard charts with her friend and former classmate Kane Brown on their diamond-certified duet "What Ifs". In addition to this song with Brown, Alaina became an in-demand duet vocalist throughout the next few years, appearing on number one collaborations with Hardy, Devin Dawson, and Dustin Lynch. Her third studio album, Sitting Pretty on Top of the World, was released on September 3, 2021.

Alaina was a contestant on the twenty-eighth season of Dancing with the Stars and placed fourth with her partner Gleb Savchenko. She is a two-time CMT Music Award winner, has received one Academy of Country Music Award, and is a two-time Country Music Association Award nominee. Alaina achieved one of country music's crowning achievements when she became a member of the Grand Ole Opry on February 12, 2022, inducted by her childhood hero Trisha Yearwood. She is currently the youngest member of the Opry.

== Early life ==
Alaina was born on November 8, 1994, to Kristy (born 1972) and Jerry Eugene "J.J." Suddeth (1971–2024) of Rossville, Georgia. Her father worked as a process technician in Chattanooga, Tennessee. Her mother currently works as an actress and a TV host.

At eight, Alaina entered the talent competition of the Southern Stars Pageant and won. The next year she was selected to perform on the Kids talent stage at Chattanooga's Riverbend Festival. She performed on that stage annually until age 12, when she won the competition that allowed her to perform on the festival's big stage. She traveled to Orlando, Florida, when she was 10 to compete in the American Model and Talent Competition. She won the event, beating out 1,500 kids. Alaina sang with the Georgia Country Gospel Music Association's children's group. At age 12, Alaina made her first of many trips to Nashville. In 2009, Alaina was the first winner of the WinniSTAR youth talent contest at Lake Winnepesaukah amusement park. In addition to performing, Alaina wrote several songs including "Leaving" and "Set Me Free".

Alaina was inspired to sing by her cousin, Holly Witherow, who was diagnosed with a brain tumor. Prior to Idol, Alaina worked at CiCi's Pizza. She attended Lakeview-Fort Oglethorpe High School in Fort Oglethorpe, Georgia, where she was a cheerleader.

Before auditioning for Idol, she was rejected on America's Got Talent twice.

== American Idol ==
=== Overview ===
Alaina auditioned for the tenth season of American Idol in Nashville, Tennessee. From early on, Alaina was a judge favorite. After her audition, Idol judge Steven Tyler stated, "We found the one." May 14, 2011, was proclaimed "Lauren Alaina Day" in her hometown of Rossville, Georgia. During the season finale, Alaina sang "Before He Cheats" with her idol, Carrie Underwood. On May 25, 2011, Alaina was declared the runner-up, losing to Scotty McCreery.

=== Performances and results ===
Episode	Theme	Song choice	Result
Audition	Auditioner's Choice	Solo "Like We Never Loved at All"	Advanced
Audition	Auditioner's Choice	Duet "I Don't Want to Miss a Thing" with Steven Tyler	Advanced
Hollywood Round, Part 1	First Solo	"Unchained Melody"	Advanced
Hollywood Round, Part 2	Group Performance	"Some Kind of Wonderful"	Advanced
Hollywood Round, Part 3	Second Solo	"I Don't Want to Miss a Thing"	Advanced
Las Vegas Round	Songs of The Beatles; Group Performance	"Hello, Goodbye"	Advanced
Hollywood Round Final	Final Solo	"Unchained Melody"	Advanced
Top 24 (12 Women)	Personal Choice	"Turn On the Radio"	Advanced
Top 13	Your Personal Idol	"Any Man of Mine"	Safe
Top 12	Year You Were Born	"I'm the Only One"	Safe
Top 11	Motown	"You Keep Me Hangin' On"	Safe
Top 11^{1}	Elton John	"Candle in the Wind"	Safe
Top 9	Rock & Roll Hall of Fame	"(You Make Me Feel Like) A Natural Woman"	Safe
Top 8	Songs from the Movies	"The Climb" – Hannah Montana: The Movie	Safe
Top 7	Songs from the 21st Century	"Born to Fly"	Safe
Top 6	Carole King	Solo "Where You Lead"	Safe
Top 6	Carole King	Duet "Up on the Roof" with Scotty McCreery	Safe
Top 5	Songs from Now and Then	"Flat on the Floor"	Bottom two
Top 5	Songs from Now and Then	"Unchained Melody"	Bottom two
Top 4	Inspirational Songs	"Anyway"	Safe
Top 4	Leiber & Stoller Songbook	"Trouble"	Safe
Top 3	Contestant's Choice	"Wild One"	Safe
Top 3	Jimmy Iovine's Choice	"If I Die Young"	Safe
Top 3	Judges' Choice	"I Hope You Dance"	Safe
Finale	Favorite Idol Performance	"Flat on the Floor"	Runner-up
Finale	Carrie Underwood's Choice	"Maybe It Was Memphis"	Runner-up
Finale	Coronation Song	"Like My Mother Does"	Runner-up

- ^Note 1 Due to the judges using their one save on Casey Abrams, the Top 11 remained intact for another week, when two contestants were eliminated.
- ^Note 2 When Ryan Seacrest announced the results for this particular night, Alaina was in the bottom 2, but was declared safe as Jacob Lusk was eliminated.

== Music career ==
Following Idol, Alaina was signed to Interscope Records, Mercury Nashville and 19 Recordings. Alaina released her single "Like My Mother Does". The song entered the Billboard Hot Country Songs chart at number 49 and the Hot 100 chart at number 20 and sold 121,000 copies in its first week. "Like My Mother Does" peaked at number 36 on the Hot Country Songs chart.

Following the conclusion of Season 10, Alaina appeared and performed on several talk shows such as The Tonight Show with Jay Leno, Live with Regis and Kelly and The Today Show. On June 8, 2011, Alaina and McCreery presented at the CMT Music Awards. In addition, Alaina made her Grand Ole Opry debut on June 10. She performed with Martina McBride at LP Field during the CMA Music Festival. The following summer, Alaina toured with the American Idols Live! Tour 2011, which began in West Valley City, Utah on July 6, 2011, and ended in Manila, Philippines on September 21, 2011.

=== 2011–2012: Wildflower ===
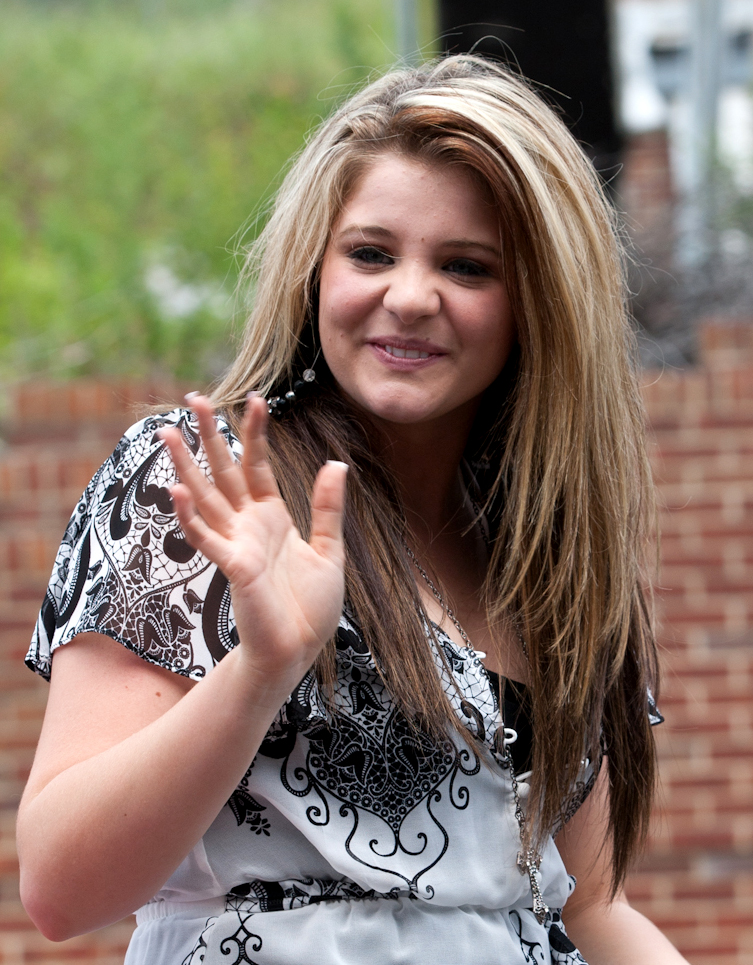
Alaina in 2011

On October 11, 2011, Alaina released her debut album Wildflower, which debuted at number five on the US Billboard 200 chart, number two on the Billboard Top Country Albums chart, and sold 69,000 copies the first week. The album was the best-selling digital album by a debut country female. The lead single "Georgia Peaches" reached number 28 on the Billboard Hot Country Songs chart.

To promote her album, Alaina made numerous television and radio appearances. She performed her single "Georgia Peaches" on Good Morning America, Live with Regis and Kelly and The Ellen DeGeneres Show. On October 22, 2011, Alaina performed at Opry Goes Pink, a benefit concert at the Grand Ole Opry for Women for the Cure. On November 10, 2011, Alaina performed "My Grown Up Christmas List" on CMA Country Christmas. In addition, Alaina performed for Barack Obama and Michelle Obama in the PBS special In Performance at the White House on November 21. She sang the National Anthem at the Thanksgiving Day game between the Detroit Lions and Green Bay Packers. On New Year's Eve, Alaina performed her single "Georgia Peaches" on American Country New Year's Eve Live.

Alaina served as an opening act for Jason Aldean's My Kinda Party Tour from January 20, 2012, to May 19, 2012. In addition to the My Kinda Party Tour, Alaina opened for Sugarland's In the Hands of the Fans Tour for a number of selected dates, beginning on April 5, 2012, and concluding on September 1, 2012. On March 8, 2012, Alaina performed "Georgia Peaches" on the eleventh season of American Idol. On March 26, 2012, Alaina performed her single "Georgia Peaches" on The Today Show. On June 16, 2012, Alaina headlined the final show of Riverbend, a music festival in her hometown of Chattanooga, Tennessee.

In July 2012, "Eighteen Inches" became Alaina's third single off her album, Wildflower. The single was sent to country radio on July 16. "Eighteen Inches" hit number 37 on the Billboard Hot Country Songs list. In support of the song, Alaina embarked on an 18-city tour. Proceeds from each show benefited various local charities, including the Special Olympics. The Inch-By-Inch tour kicked off on September 21, 2012, and wrapped up November 12, 2012.

At the 2012 American Country Awards, Alaina was selected as the New Artist of the Year.

=== 2013–2017: Lauren Alaina EP and Road Less Traveled ===
In January 2013, Alaina started recording her second album. On May 7, 2013, Alaina released the single "Barefoot and Buckwild", which charted at thirty-four on the Billboard Hot Country Songs chart. She performed the song on the twelfth season of American Idol on May 9, 2013. In May 2013, Alaina also released a track titled "Antarctica: One World, One Family". The track serves as the theme song for the SeaWorld attraction Antarctica: Empire of the Penguin. On December 10, 2013, Alaina released her cover of "My Grown Up Christmas List". On September 18, 2015, Alaina released the single "Next Boyfriend". "Next Boyfriend" was added to radio stations on September 28. It reached number 39 on the Billboard Hot Country Songs chart. An EP followed on October 2, 2015. A track on the EP, "History" was used for ESPN College Football coverage.

Throughout 2016, Alaina opened for several shows on Alan Jackson's Still Keepin' It Country Tour. On November 18, 2016, Alaina released her cover of "O Holy Night".

Alaina released the single "Road Less Traveled", which she co-wrote with Meghan Trainor and Jesse Frasure, on July 11, 2016. Alaina performed the track on The Today Show on September 8, 2016 and on Harry on February 7, 2017. In April 2017, "Road Less Traveled" reached number one on the Billboard Country Airplay chart.

On January 27, 2017, Alaina released her second album Road Less Traveled. Tracks for Alaina's album include "Same Day Different Bottle", "Doin' Fine", "My Kinda People", "Pretty", "Crashin' the Boys Club" and "Queen of Hearts", as well as four tracks from her self-titled EP. Alaina describes Road Less Traveled as "very different" from her debut album. In addition, self acceptance and love is a big theme on the album. "We are all different and that's what makes us all beautiful. The album will reflect that further. It will have some fun songs and sad songs – a little bit of what my life has been like over the past few years", Alaina says. Alaina performed "Doin' Fine" on Good Morning America on January 31, 2017.

In February and March 2017, Alaina toured with Martina McBride on her Love Unleashed Tour. Throughout June and July 2017, Alaina appeared on Luke Bryan's Huntin', Fishin' and Lovin' Every Day Tour for a number of selected dates. In May 2017, Alaina contributed guest vocals to the song "Are You Happy Now" from Rascal Flatts' tenth studio album, Back to Us.

Alaina's third single from Road Less Traveled, "Doin' Fine", was released May 22, 2017. The song peaked at number 27 on the Billboard Country Airplay chart, making it her second-highest-charting single. Alaina became the only female to top both country charts in 2017 after "Road Less Traveled" topped the Country Airplay chart and "What Ifs" topped the Hot Country chart. This also made her one of the only three women to top either country chart in 2017.

Alaina performed "Doin' Fine" and "What Ifs" at the 2018 ACM Awards where she won the award for New Female Vocalist of the Year. At the 2018 CMT Music Awards, Alaina and Brown won the award for "Best Collaborative Video" for "What Ifs" and were among the top five vote getters for "Video of the Year" for the same song.

=== 2018-present: Getting Good, Getting Over Him EPs and Sitting Pretty on Top of the World ===
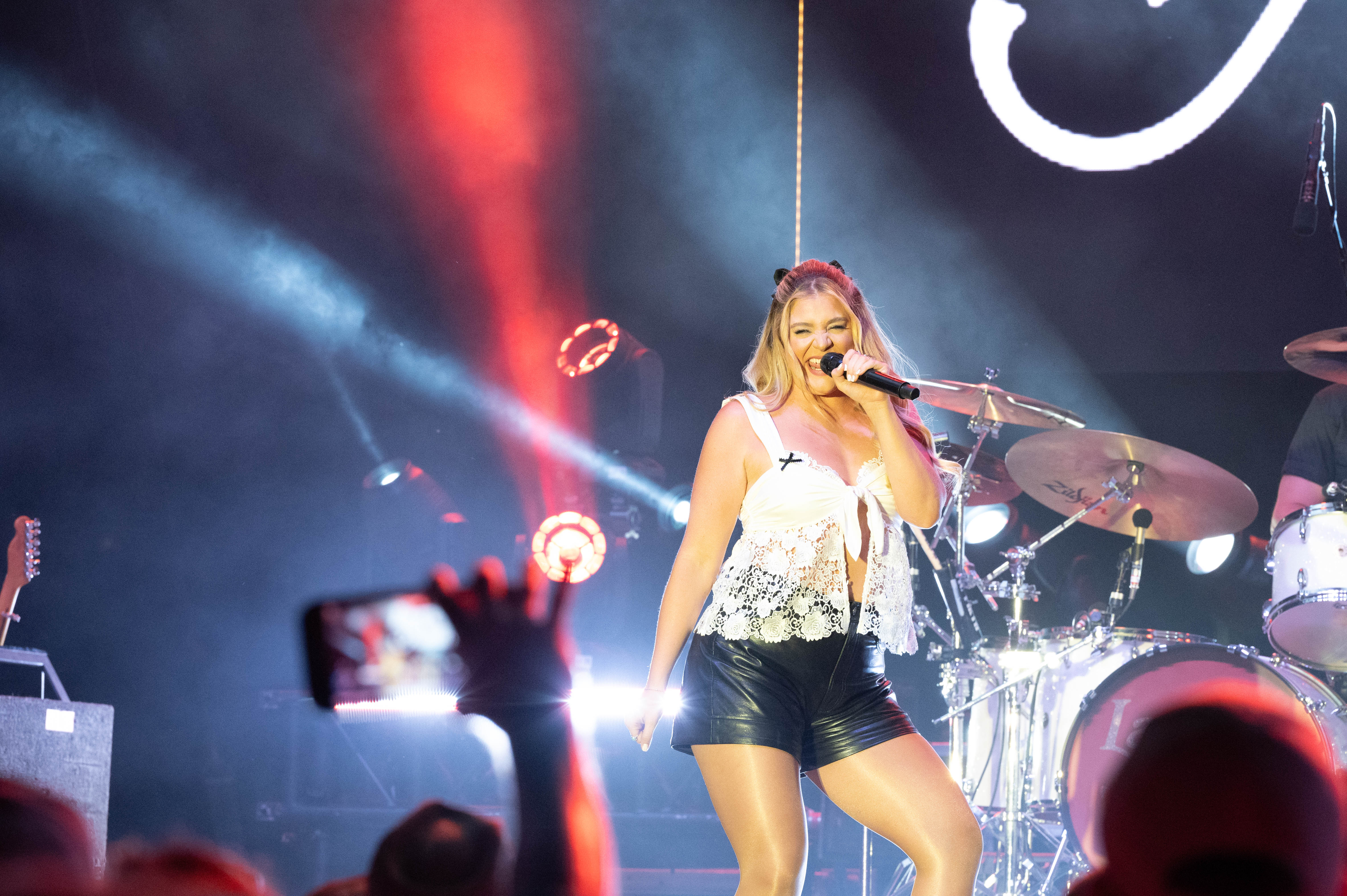
Alaina performing in 2024

Alaina released the single, "Ladies in the '90s", on October 5, 2018. The song was released to country radio on October 15. The single reached number 40 on the Billboard Country Airplay.

Alaina was nominated for New Artist of the Year at the 51st Annual Country Music Association Awards in 2017 and 52nd Annual Country Music Association Awards in 2018.

Throughout 2018 and 2019, Alaina toured with artists such as Alan Jackson, Cole Swindell, Jason Aldean, and Blake Shelton. She headlined numerous major music festivals such as Stagecoach Festival.

Alaina released the single, "Getting Good", on September 27, 2019. The song was released to country radio on October 7. "The Other Side" was released as a promotional single on October 22 and was danced to in a Dancing with the Stars episode in memory of her stepfather. On March 6, 2020, she released the Getting Good EP including those two tracks and Ladies in the '90s. On September 4, 2020, she released the EP Getting Over Him. Alaina's first single from the EP, "Getting Over Him", featuring Jon Pardi was released on February 23, 2021. Alaina released her third studio album, Sitting Pretty on Top of the World, on September 3, 2021.

In March 2021, Alaina revealed that she had tested positive for COVID-19. On December 18, 2021, Alaina was asked to become an official member of The Grand Ole Opry.

On July 25, 2022, Alaina signed with Big Loud Records.

== Other ventures ==
In September and October 2016, Alaina filmed her very first movie The Road Less Traveled, which took place in Knoxville, Tennessee. The film was released on June 6, 2017. It then premiered on CMT on November 10, 2017.

In August 2019, Alaina was announced as one of the celebrities to compete on season 28 of Dancing with the Stars. She made it to the finals and finished in fourth place.

In 2021, Alaina starred in the Hallmark film, Roadhouse Romance, which premiered on September 11, 2021.

She was a contestant on Beyond the Edge, a survival competition series that premiered in March 2022. She tore her ligament, ending her time on the show, later admitting that her exit was the right call.

== Personal life ==
Alaina's parents divorced in 2013. Her father was a recovering alcoholic who got sober in October 2013. Both her parents remarried. In 2018, her stepfather died from cancer. Her father died in 2024.

Throughout her teen years, Alaina struggled with bulimia. She said in a 2016 Rolling Stone interview, "I had an eating disorder for like four years, and I was just lost" and "I found myself in these last few years, through music and family and good people around me."

Alaina is a Christian and often states that she lives for Jesus Christ.

In 2012, Alaina began dating Alexander Hopkins. In July 2018, the couple announced that they had become engaged. In January 2019, they announced that they had split after six years. She was then in a relationship with comedian John Crist for several months in 2019. In November 2022, Alaina announced her engagement to Cam Arnold. The couple married on February 4, 2024, and announced that they were expecting their first child after revealing her pregnancy in her music video for "Those Kind of Women". On June 11, 2025, their daughter was born.

== Discography ==
Studio albums

- Wildflower (2011)
- Road Less Traveled (2017)
- Sitting Pretty on Top of the World (2021)
- Stages (2026)

== Awards and nominations ==
Year	Award	Category	Nominee / Work	Result	Ref
2012	CMT Music Awards	USA Breakthrough Video of the Year	"Georgia Peaches"	Nominated	
2012	Teen Choice Awards	Choice Female Country Artist	Herself	Nominated	
2012	Teen Choice Awards	Choice TV: Female Reality Star (American Idol)	Herself	Nominated	
2012	American Country Awards	New Artist of the Year	Herself	Won	
2017	ACM Awards	New Female Vocalist of the Year	Herself	Nominated	
2017	Radio Disney Music Awards	Country Best New Artist	Herself	Nominated	
2017	CMT Music Awards	Breakthrough Video of the Year	"Road Less Traveled"	Won	
2017	CMT Music Awards	Female Video of the Year	"Road Less Traveled"	Nominated	
2017	CMT Music Awards	Social Superstar	Herself	Nominated	
2017	Music Row Awards	Breakthrough Artist Writer of the Year	Herself	Won	
2017	CMA Awards	New Artist of the Year	Herself	Nominated	
2018	ACM Awards	New Female Vocalist of the Year	Herself	Won	
2018	ACM Awards	Vocal Event of the Year	"What Ifs" with (Kane Brown)	Nominated	
2018	Billboard Music Award	Top Country Song	"What Ifs" with (Kane Brown)	Nominated	
2018	CMT Music Awards	Video of the Year	"What Ifs" with (Kane Brown)	Nominated	
2018	CMT Music Awards	Collaborative Video of the Year	"What Ifs" with (Kane Brown)	Won	
2018	CMT Music Awards	Female Video of the Year	"Doin' Fine"	Nominated	
2018	Women in Music City Awards	Breakout Artist of the Year	Herself	Won	
2018	CMA Awards	New Artist of the Year	Herself	Nominated	
2018	Taste of Country Fan Choice Awards	Best Performance of the Year	"What Ifs" with (Kane Brown)	Won	
2018	iHeartRadio Music Awards	Best New Country Artist	Herself	Nominated	
2019	Musicians On Call 20th Anniversary Kickoff Celebration	Music Heals Award	Herself	Won	
2021	ACM Awards	Vocal Event of the Year	"One Beer" with Hardy & Devin Dawson	Nominated	
2022	Grand Ole Opry	Inducted as a member	Herself	Won	

== Tours ==
=== Headlining ===
- 18-City Inch-by-Inch Tour (2012)
- That Girl Was Me Tour (2020)
- Sitting Pretty On Top of the World Tour (2022)
- The Stages Tour (2026)

=== Co-Headlining ===
- American Idols LIVE! Tour (2011)

=== Supporting ===
- My Kinda Party Tour (2012) with Jason Aldean and Luke Bryan
- In The Hands Of Fans Tour (2012) with Sugarland
- C2C: Country to Country (2016) with Carrie Underwood
- Keepin' It Country Tour (2016) with Alan Jackson
- Love Unleashed Tour (2017) with Martina McBride
- Huntin', Fishin', and Lovin' Everyday Tour (2017) with Luke Bryan
- Side Effects Tour (2017) with Dallas Smith
- Reason to Drink Tour (2018) with Cole Swindell
- High Noon Neon Tour (2018) with Jason Aldean and Luke Combs
- Reason to Drink...Another Tour (2018) with Cole Swindell and Dustin Lynch
- Crash My Playa (2019) with Luke Bryan
- Friends and Heroes Tour (2019–2020) with Blake Shelton
- Songs About You Tour (2022) with Brett Eldredge
- Pentatonix (The World Tour) (2023) with Pentatonix
- Life is a Highway Tour (2025-2026) with Rascal Flatts

Preceded by Crystal Bowersox	American Idol runner-up 2011	Succeeded by Jessica Sanchez
