= List of songs recorded by Flyleaf =

The following is a list of songs by the American alternative metal band Flyleaf.

| Title | Year | Album | Length | Notes |
|---|---|---|---|---|
| "Again" | 2009 | Memento Mori | 3:05 | First single and music video from their second album. They started playing the demo version in 2007. |
| "All Around Me" | 2005 | Flyleaf | 3:18 | This is the 3rd single and music video from their debut album. |
| "All Around Me (acoustic)" | 2007 | Flyleaf | 3:22 | Only on 2007 re-release. |
| "Amy Says" | 2010 | Remember to Live EP | 3:37 | Re-recorded demo from the mid-2000s. |
| "Arise" | 2009 | Memento Mori | 4:18 | The fifth single from Memento Mori. |
| "Arise (Ben Moody Mix)" | 2010 | Remember to Live EP | 4:21 | An altered version of Arise, mixed by Ben Moody. |
| "Beautiful Bride" | 2009 | Memento Mori | 3:03 | This is their second single and music video on the album. |
| "Believe In Dreams" | 2010 | Remember to Live EP | 4:27 | Re-recorded demo from the mid-2000s. |
| "Bittersweet" | 2009 | Memento Mori | 4:04 | Exclusive bonus only. |
| "Break Your Knees" | 2009 | Memento Mori | 4:26 | Bonus track on Memento Mori. |
| "Breathe Today" | 2005 | Flyleaf | 2:31 | Fifth single from their debut album. A music video was released for the demo version. |
| "Broken Wings" | 2012 | New Horizons | 3:34 | This song was written back when the band was still known as "Passerby". A demo version was released on Broken Wings EP in 2003. |
| "Bury Your Heart" | 2012 | New Horizons | 3:35 | Working title was "Blood on the Tracks" |
| "Cage On The Ground" | 2012 | New Horizons | 3:34 | Supposedly written about Lacey receding from the band. |
| "Call You Out" | 2012 | New Horizons | 2:21 | Second single from the album. |
| "Cassie" | 2005 | Flyleaf | 2:58 | Written about Cassie Bernall and the Columbine School Massacre. |
| "Cassie (acoustic)" | 2007 | Flyleaf | 3:11 | Only on 2007 re-release. |
| "Chaos" | ? | Unreleased | ? | A demo song that has been mentioned by Flyleaf, but has never been released or leaked to the public, and the band has stated that it never will be. |
| "Chasm" | 2009 | Memento Mori | 2:54 | Fourth single and music video from the album |
| "Christmas Song" | 2007 | Music as a Weapon EP | 3:30 | |
| "Circle" | 2009 | Memento Mori | 3:03 | |
| "Dear My Closest Friend" | 2010 | Remember to Live EP | 2:29 | A re-recorded song from 2004. It had never been released to the public until the release of Remember to Live. |
| "Do You Hear What I Hear" | 2007 | All Around Me | 2:58 | |
| "Enemy" | 2009 | Memento Mori | 3:43 | Bonus track only. |
| "Eyes To See" | | Unreleased | 3:17 | |
| "Fire Fire" | 2012 | New Horizons | 3:03 | |
| "Freedom" | 2012 | New Horizons | 3:20 | Originally titled Blanket of Worms, then it was changed to Blanket of Words, then to Freedom. |
| "Fully Alive" | 2005 | Flyleaf | 2:34 | The second single and music video from Flyleaf's debut album. Early pressings of the album had this song at 2:48. |
| "Fully Alive (acoustic)" | 2007 | Flyleaf | 2:16 | Only on 2007 re-release |
| "Good Night, Old Friend" | 2012 | New Horizons | ? | Possibly to be released as a B-side to New Horizons |
| "Great Love" | 2012 | New Horizons | 3:42 | |
| "Green Heart" | 2012 | New Horizons | 2:44 | |
| "Guilty" | | Unreleased | 3:25 | |
| "Have We Lost" | 2009 | Memento Mori | 2:56 | Bonus track only. |
| "I'm So Sick" | 2005 | Flyleaf | 2:46 | First single and music video from their debut album. Featured on Rock Band. |
| "I'm So Sick (acoustic)" | 2007 | Flyleaf | 2:59 | Only on 2007 re-release |
| "I'm Sorry" | 2005 | Flyleaf | 2:45 | |
| "In The Dark" | 2009 | Memento Mori | 3:47 | |
| "Justice and Mercy" | 2006 | Music As A Weapon EP/Much Like Falling EP | 2:32 | |
| "Justice and Mercy (Violent Love Version)" | 2010 | Remember to Live EP | 2:39 | The "Violent Love Version" is a somewhat softer version of Justice and Mercy. |
| "The Kind" | 2009 | Memento Mori | 2:47 | |
| "Life" | | Unreleased | 3:25 | It has been stated by the band this song will never surface again. |
| "Light In Your Eyes" | 2010 | Remember to Live EP | 3:55 | |
| "Mama" | 2012 | New Horizons | 3:56 | iTunes bonus track. Lacey's mother, Lori Ann, sang on this song. |
| "Melting (Interlude)" | 2009 | Memento Mori | 0:57 | |
| "Missing" | 2009 | Memento Mori | 2:54 | Third single and music video from Memento Mori. |
| "Much Like Falling" | 2006 | Music As a Weapon EP/Much Like Falling EP | 2:07 | |
| "New Horizons" | 2012 | New Horizons | 3:11 | First single and title track from the album. |
| "Ocean Waves" | 2003 | Broken Wings EP | 2:45 | |
| "Okay" | 2010 | Remember to Live EP | 2:23 | Before the release of Remember to Live a version of "Okay" was often performed live before the song Tina. |
| "Penholder" | ? | Unknown | 4:34 | Demo that was never officially released (leaked). |
| "Perfect" | 2005 | Flyleaf | 2:49 | The fourth single from the debut album. Featured on Guitar Praise. |
| "Red Sam" | 2005 | Flyleaf | 3:20 | |
| "Red Sam (acoustic)" | 2007 | Flyleaf | 3:27 | Only on 2007 re-release |
| "Saving Grace" | 2012 | New Horizons | 3:44 | |
| "Set Apart This Dream" | 2009 | Memento Mori | 3:15 | Inspired by John Elredge's Wild at Heart. |
| "Sleepwalker" | | Unreleased | 3:23 | |
| "So I Thought" | 2005 | Flyleaf | 4:54 | |
| "Something I Can Never Have" | 2006 | Underworld: Evolution | 4:59 | A Nine Inch Nails cover. Featured on the Underworld: Evolution score. |
| "Sorrow" | 2005 | Flyleaf | 2:46 | Sixth single and fourth music video from Flyleaf. |
| "Stand" | 2012 | New Horizons | 3:40 | |
| "Stay (Faraway, So Close)" | 2009 | Memento Mori | 4:48 | Exclusive bonus only. Originally by U2. |
| "Supernatural" | | Unreleased | 3:53 | |
| "Supernatural (acoustic)" | 2007 | Much Like Falling EP | 4:28 | |
| "Swept Away" | 2009 | Memento Mori | 4:09 | |
| "There For You" | 2005 | Flyleaf | 2:48 | 7th single from Flyleaf. |
| "This Close" | 2009 | Memento Mori | 3:21 | |
| "Tina" | 2007 | Much Like Falling EP | 2:33 | Featured on Guitar Hero III. Written about a woman who met Lacey and told her about her life. |
| "Tiny Heart" | 2009 | Memento Mori | 3:07 | "Tiny Heart" is a re-worked demo of a song that was written in the mid-2000s, before the release of Flyleaf's debut album. |
| "Treasure" | 2009 | Memento Mori | 3:24 | Written about Lacey's engagement to Joshua Sturm. |
| "Uncle Bobby" | 2009 | Memento Mori | 4:29 | Bonus Track. On the CD it is placed before "Beautiful Bride" and can be heard by rewinding the disc to -4:28. On digital versions of the album, the song is track 15. |
| "What's This?" | 2008 | Nightmare Revisited | 3:20 | A cover of a song from The Nightmare Before Christmas. |
| "Whispering Fingertips" | | Unreleased | 3:56 | |
| "Who Am I" | 2009 | Memento Mori | 2:37 | Bonus Track. |
