= Flyleaf discography =

Cataloging of published recordings by Flyleaf

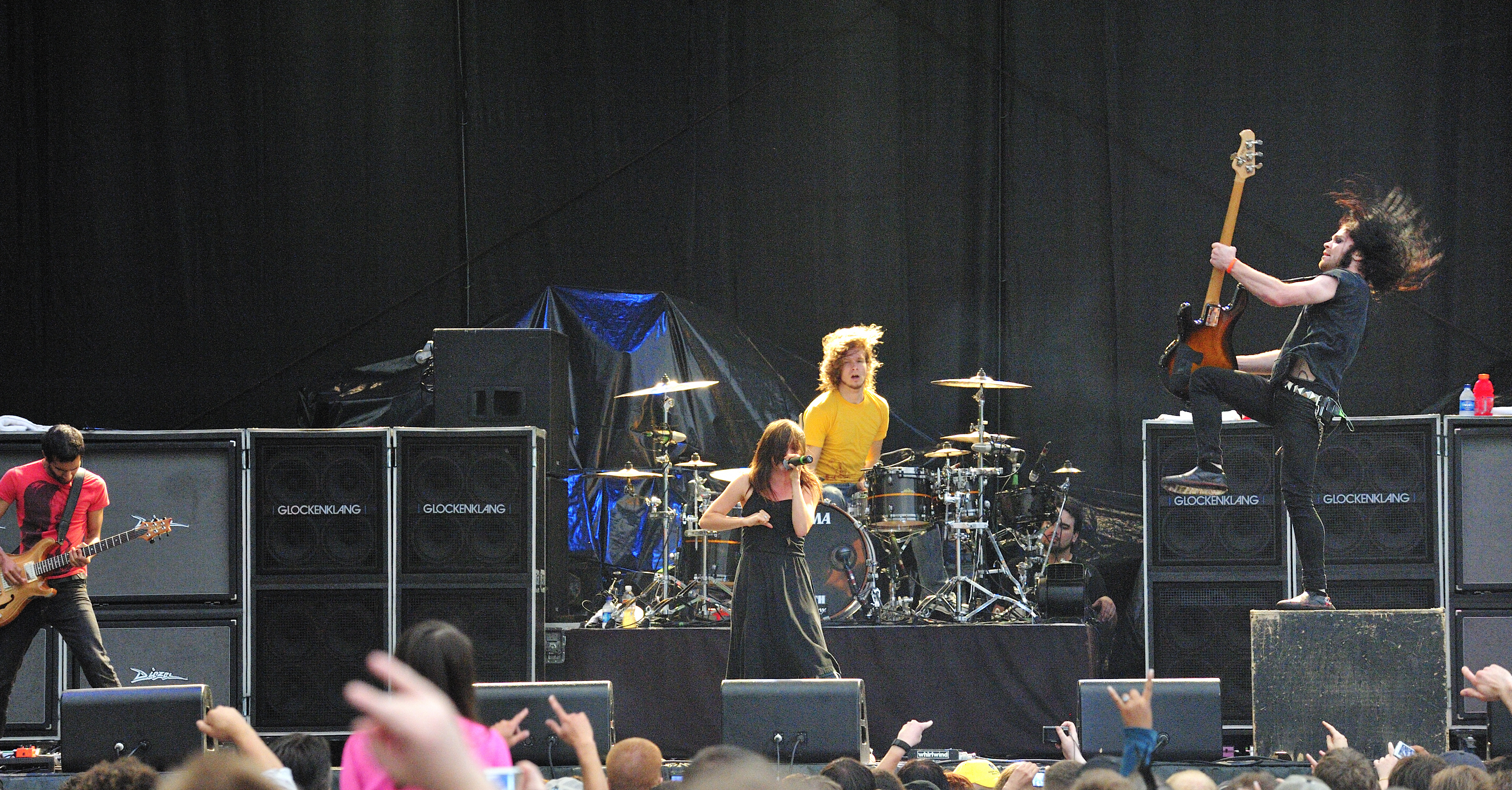
- Studio albums: 4
- Extended plays: 7
- Singles: 16
- Music videos: 12

The discography of American hard rock band Flyleaf consists of four studio albums, seven extended plays, 15 singles and 12 music videos.

== Albums ==
=== Studio albums ===
List of studio albums, with selected chart positions and certifications
| Title | Album details | Peak chart positions | | | | | | Certifications |
| Title | Album details | US | US Alt. | US Christ. | US Hard Rock | US Rock | JPN | Certifications |
|---|---|---|---|---|---|---|---|---|
| Flyleaf | Released: September 27, 2005 (US); Label: A&M/Octone; Formats: CD, digital download | 57 | 11 | 1 | 5 | 12 | 89 | RIAA: Platinum |
| Memento Mori | Released: November 10, 2009 (US); Label: A&M/Octone; Formats: CD, LP, digital download | 8 | 1 | 1 | 1 | 2 | — | |
| New Horizons | Released: October 30, 2012 (US); Label: A&M/Octone; Formats: CD, digital download | 16 | 2 | 1 | 2 | 4 | — | |
| Between the Stars | Released: September 16, 2014 (US); Label: Loud & Proud; Formats: CD, LP, digital download | 33 | 1 | 3 | 4 | 8 | — | |
"—" denotes a recording that did not chart or was not released in that territory.

=== Extended plays ===
List of extended plays, with selected chart positions
| Title | Album details | Peak chart positions | | | |
| Title | Album details | US | US Alt. | US Christ. | US Rock |
|---|---|---|---|---|---|
| Broken Wings | Released: 2002 (US); Label: Dang! Studios; Formats: CD | — | — | — | — |
| Passerby | Released: 2003 (US); Label: Dang! Studios; Formats: CD | — | — | — | — |
| Flyleaf | Released: October 26, 2004 (US); Label: A&M/Octone; Formats: CD, digital download | — | — | — | — |
| Music as a Weapon | Released: November 2006 (US); Label: J, A&M/Octone; Formats: CD, digital download | — | — | — | — |
| Much Like Falling | Released: October 30, 2007 (US); Label: A&M/Octone; Formats: CD, digital download | — | — | — | — |
| Remember to Live | Released: December 7, 2010 (US); Label: A&M/Octone, Interscope; Formats: CD, digital download | 111 | 9 | 4 | 15 |
| Who We Are | Released: July 9, 2013 (US); Label: A&M/Octone, Polydor; Formats: CD, digital download | — | — | 35 | — |
"—" denotes a recording that did not chart or was not released in that territory.

== Singles ==
List of singles, with selected chart positions and certifications, showing year released and album name
| Title | Year | Peak chart positions | | | | | | | | | Certifications | Album |
| Title | Year | US | US Adult | US Alt. | US Christ. | US Christ. AC | US Christ. Rock | US Heri. Rock | US Main. Rock | US Rock | Certifications | Album |
|---|---|---|---|---|---|---|---|---|---|---|---|---|
| "Breathe Today" | 2004 | — | — | — | — | — | — | — | — | × | | Flyleaf EP |
| "Do You Hear What I Hear?" | 2005 | — | — | — | — | — | — | — | — | × | | Non-album single |
| "I'm So Sick" | 2005 | — | — | 27 | — | — | — | — | 12 | × | RIAA: 2× Platinum | Flyleaf |
| "Fully Alive" | 2006 | — (Note: "Fully Alive" did not enter the Billboard Hot 100, but peaked at number 25 on the Bubbling Under Hot 100 Singles chart, which acts as an extension to the Hot 100.) | — | 31 | — | — | — | — | 13 | × | RIAA: Platinum | Flyleaf |
| "All Around Me" | 2007 | 40 | 23 | 6 | — | — | — | — | 20 | × | RIAA: 4× Platinum | Flyleaf |
| “Sorrow” | 2008 | | | | | | | | | | | Flyleaf |
| "Again" | 2009 | — | — | 3 | 26 | 6 | 1 | 28 | 16 | 12 | | Memento Mori |
| "Beautiful Bride" | 2009 | — | — | — | — | — | — | — | — | — | | Memento Mori |
| "Missing" | 2010 | — | — | — | — | — | 26 | — | — | — | | Memento Mori |
| "Chasm" | 2010 | — | — | — | — | — | 1 | — | 26 | 48 | | Memento Mori |
| "Arise" | 2010 | — | — | — | — | — | 1 | — | — | — | | Memento Mori |
| "How He Loves" | 2010 | — | — | — | — | — | — | — | — | — | | Non-album single |
| "New Horizons" | 2012 | — | — | — | — | — | 1 | — | — | — | | New Horizons |
| "Call You Out" | 2012 | — | — | — | — | — | — | — | — | — | | New Horizons |
| "Set Me on Fire" | 2014 | — | — | — | 34 | — | — | — | 36 | — | | Between the Stars |
| "Thread" | 2015 | — | — | — | — | — | — | — | 37 | — | | Between the Stars |
"—" denotes a recording that did not chart or was not released in that territory. "×" denotes periods where charts did not exist or were not archived.

=== Promotional singles ===
- “Breathe Today”
- ”There For You”
- "Perfect"
- "Cassie"
- "This Close"
- "In the Dark"
- "Set Apart This Dream"
- "Cage On the Ground"
- "Great Love"
- "Bury Your Heart"
- "Green Heart"
- "Something Better"
- "Platonic"
- "Home"

== Other charted songs ==
List of songs, with selected chart positions, showing year released and album name
| Title | Year | Peak chart positions | Album |
| Title | Year | US Hard Rock | Album |
|---|---|---|---|
| "Broken Wings" | 2012 | 10 | New Horizons |

== Guest appearances ==
List of non-single guest appearances, showing year released and album name
| Title | Year | Album |
|---|---|---|
| "Something I Can Never Have" | 2006 | Underworld: Evolution score |
| "Stay (Faraway, So Close)" | 2006 | The Target Red Room, Volume 5 |
| "Pride (In the Name of Love)" (featuring Richard Patrick) | 2006 | The Family Values Tour 2006 |
| "I'm So Sick" (T-Virus Remix) (versus The Legion of Doom) | 2007 | Resident Evil: Extinction soundtrack |
| "Tina" | 2007 | Guitar Hero III: Legends of Rock soundtrack |
| "What's This?" | 2008 | Nightmare Revisited |

== Music videos ==
List of music videos, showing year released and directors
| Title | Year | Director(s) |
|---|---|---|
| "Breathe Today" | 2004 | Dave Garcia |
| "I'm So Sick" | 2006 | The Brothers Strause |
| "Fully Alive" | 2006 | The Brothers Strause |
| "All Around Me" | 2007 | Paul Fedor |
| "Sorrow" | 2008 | Jake Davis |
| "Again" | 2009 | Meiert Avis |
| "Beautiful Bride" | 2009 | Don Tyler |
| "Missing" | 2010 | Diane Martel |
| "Chasm" | 2010 | Giles Timms |
| "New Horizons" | 2012 | Don Tyler |
| "Call You Out" | 2012 | Brad Scott |
| "Set Me on Fire" | 2014 | Noel Maitland |
