= Flyleaf =

Flyleaf may refer to:

- In book design, a blank leaf near the front or back cover: see Book design § Front cover, spine, and back cover
- Flyleaf (band), an American rock band
  - Flyleaf (EP), a 2004 EP by the band of the same name
  - Flyleaf (album), a 2005 album by the band of the same name
  - Flyleaf discography
- Flyleaf Press, a publishing company in Dublin, Ireland
