= Rich man and Lazarus =

Parable of Jesus

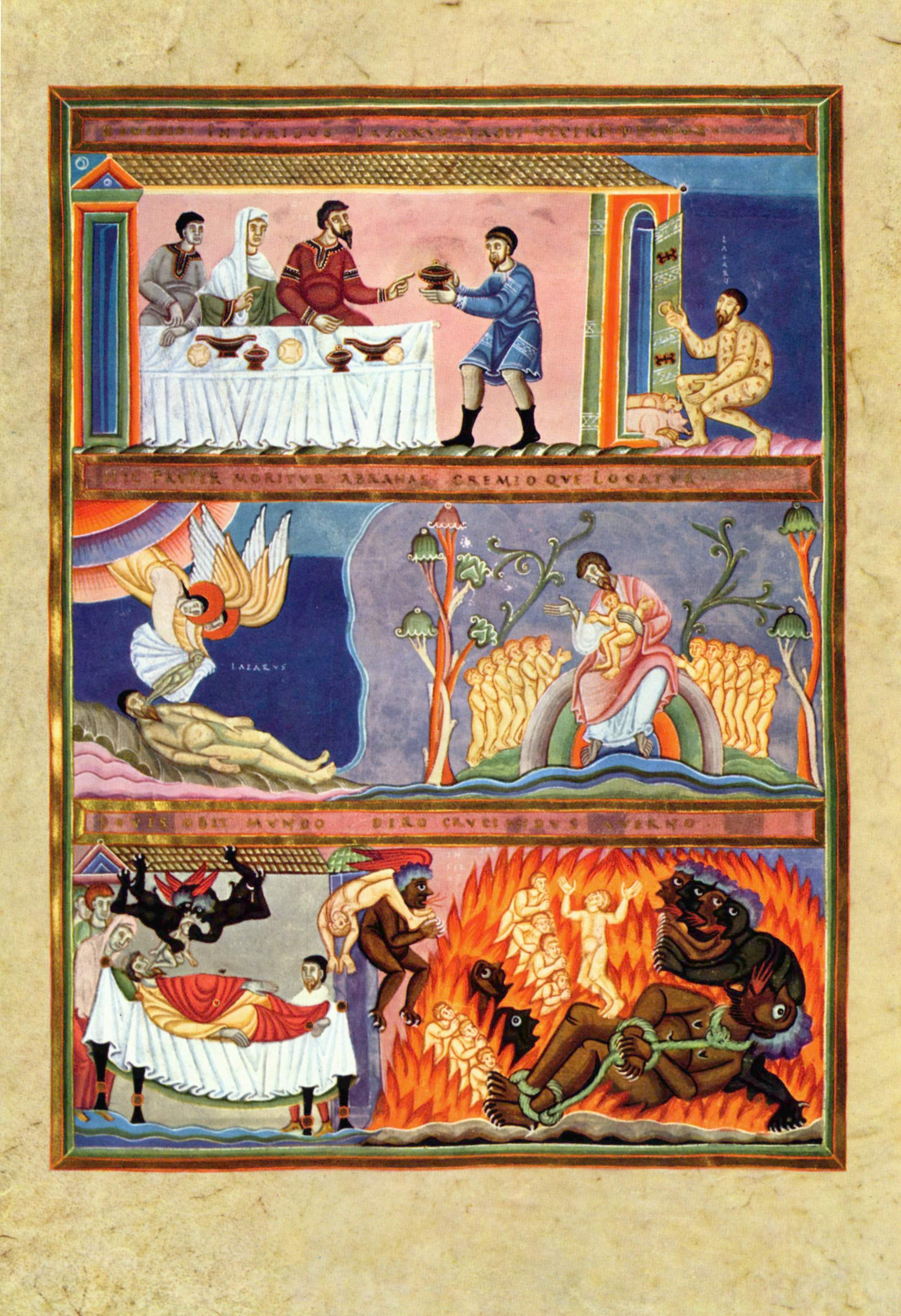
Lazarus and Dives, illumination from the 11th-century Codex Aureus of Echternach Top panel: Lazarus at the rich man's door Middle panel: Lazarus' soul is carried to Paradise by two angels; Lazarus in Abraham's bosom Bottom panel: The rich man's soul is carried off by Satan to Hell; the rich man is tortured in Hades

The rich man and Lazarus (also called the parable of Dives and Lazarus) (Note: The traditional name Dives is not actually a name, but instead a word for "rich man", dīves, in the text of the Latin Bible, the Vulgate. It is pronounced in English /ˈdaɪviːz/, DIE-veez. The rich man was also given the names Neuēs (i.e. Nineveh) and Fineas (i.e. Phineas) in the 3rd and 4th centuries.) is a parable of Jesus from the 16th chapter of the Gospel of Luke. Speaking to his disciples and some Pharisees, Jesus tells of an unnamed rich man and a beggar named Lazarus. When both die, the rich man goes to Hades and implores Abraham to send Lazarus from his bosom to warn the rich man's family from sharing his fate. Abraham replies, "If they do not listen to Moses and the Prophets, they will not be convinced even if someone rises from the dead."

Along with the parables of the Ten Virgins, Prodigal Son, and Good Samaritan, the rich man and Lazarus was one of the most frequently illustrated parables in medieval art, perhaps because of its vivid account of an afterlife.

== Text ==
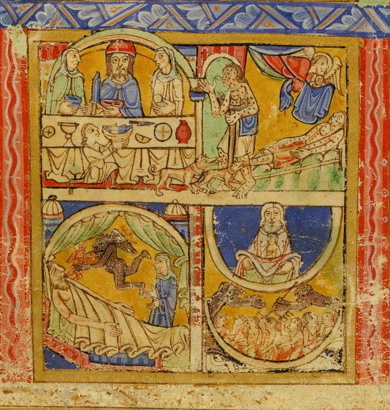
Detail from the prefatory cycle to the Eadwine Psalter, Morgan Library leaf M.521 (recto), English c. 1160s

There was a certain rich man who was clothed in purple and fine linen and fared sumptuously every day. But there was a certain beggar named Lazarus, full of sores, who was laid at his gate, desiring to be fed with the crumbs which fell from the rich man's table. Moreover the dogs came and licked his sores. So it was that the beggar died, and was carried by the angels to Abraham's bosom. The rich man also died and was buried. And being in torments in Hades, he lifted up his eyes and saw Abraham afar off, and Lazarus in his bosom.

Then he cried and said, "Father Abraham, have mercy on me, and send Lazarus that he may dip the tip of his finger in water and cool my tongue; for I am tormented in this flame." But Abraham said, "Son, remember that in your lifetime you received your good things, and likewise Lazarus evil things; but now he is comforted and you are tormented. And besides all this, between us and you there is a great gulf fixed, so that those who want to pass from here to you cannot, nor can those from there pass to us."

Then he said, "I beg you therefore, father, that you would send him to my father's house, for I have five brothers, that he may testify to them, lest they also come to this place of torment." Abraham said to him, "They have Moses and the prophets; let them hear them." And he said, "No, father Abraham; but if one goes to them from the dead, they will repent." But he said to him, "If they do not hear Moses and the prophets, neither will they be persuaded though one rise from the dead."

— Luke 16:19–31

== Interpretations ==
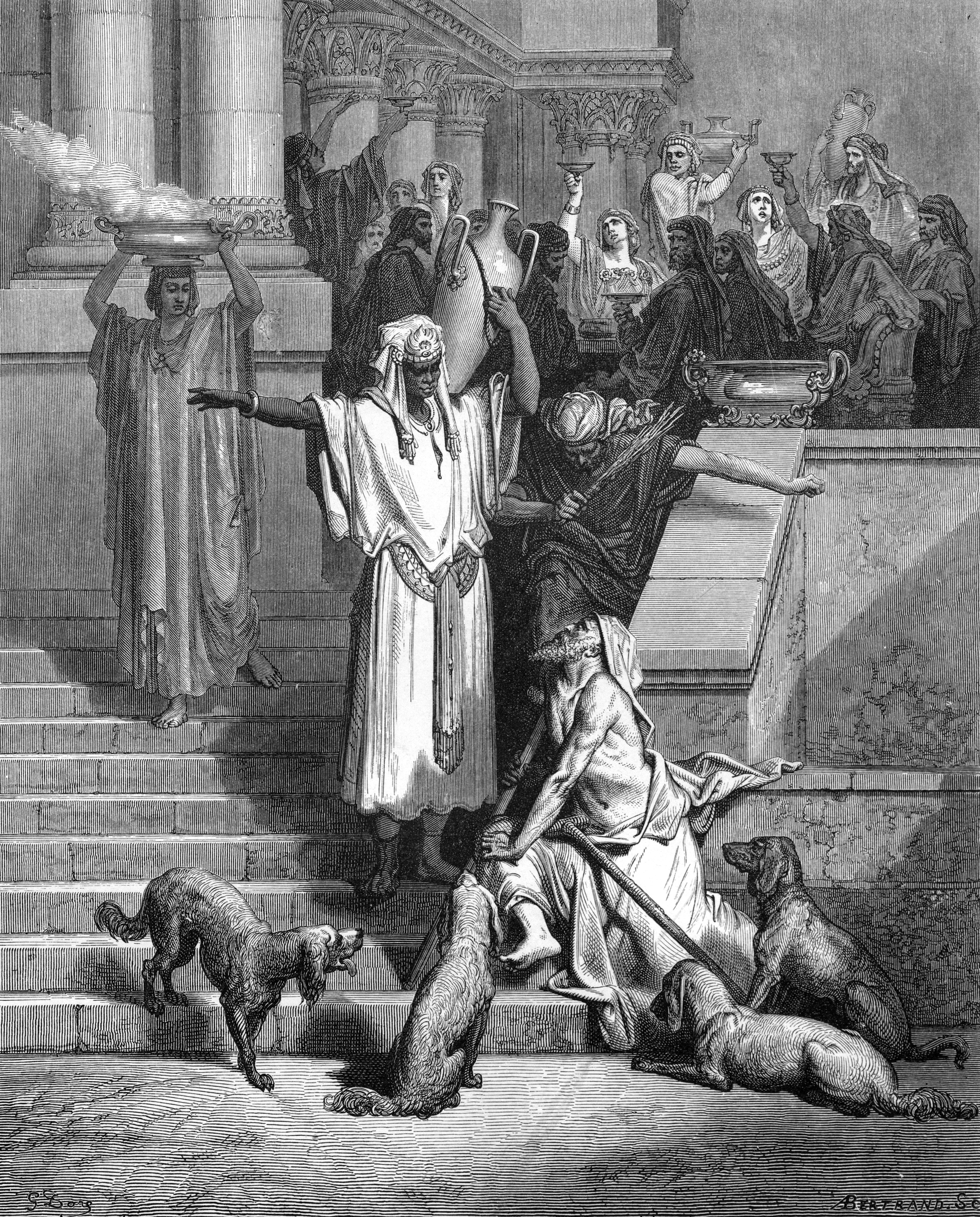
Illustration by Gustave Doré of the Rich man and Lazarus.

There are different views on the historicity and origin of the story of the Rich Man and Lazarus.

The story is unique to Luke and is not thought to come from the hypothetical Q document.

=== As a literal historical event ===
St. Jerome and others view the story not as a parable, but as an actual event which was related by Jesus to his followers.

Supporters of this view point to a key detail in the story: the use of a personal name (Lazarus). By contrast, in all of the other parables Jesus refers to a central character by a description, such as "a certain man", "a sower", and so forth.

=== As a parable created by Jesus ===
Other Christians consider that this is a parable created by Jesus and told to his followers. Tom Wright and Joachim Jeremias both treat it as a "parable". Proponents of this view argue that the story of Lazarus and the rich man has much in common with other stories which are agreed-upon parables, both in language and content (e.g., the reversal of fortunes, the use of antithesis, and concern for the poor).

==== Luther: a parable of the conscience ====
Martin Luther taught that the story was a parable about rich and poor in this life and the details of the afterlife not to be taken literally:

Therefore we conclude that the bosom of Abraham signifies nothing else than the Word of God, ... the hell here mentioned cannot be the true hell that will begin on the day of judgment. For the corpse of the rich man is without doubt not in hell, but buried in the earth; it must however be a place where the soul can be and has no peace, and it cannot be corporeal. Therefore it seems to me, this hell is the conscience, which is without faith and without the Word of God, in which the soul is buried and held until the day of judgment, when they are cast down body and soul into the true and real hell.

— Church Postil 1522–23

==== Lightfoot: a parable against the Pharisees ====
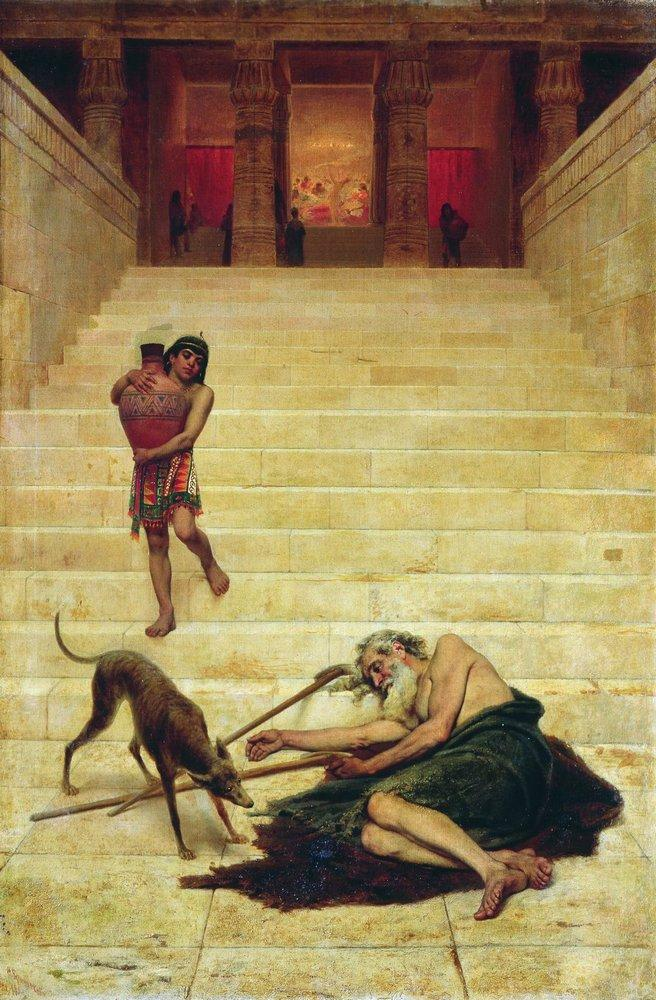
Illustration of Lazarus at the rich man's gate by Fyodor Bronnikov, 1886.

John Lightfoot (1602–1675) treated the parable as a parody of Pharisee belief concerning the Bosom of Abraham, as well as a metaphor for the future Jewish refusal to believe in Christ despite the resurrection, with Abraham saying the rich man's family would not believe even if the dead came back to life:

Any one may see, how Christ points at the infidelity of the Jews, even after that himself shall have risen again. From whence it is easy to judge what was the design and intention of this parable.

— Talmud and Hebraica, Volume 3

E. W. Bullinger in the Companion Bible cited Lightfoot's comment, and expanded it to include the coincidence that the Pharisees also didn't believe after the resurrection of Lazarus of Bethany (John 12:10). Bullinger considered that Luke did not identify the passage as a "parable" because it contains a parody of the Pharisee view of the afterlife. That is, Jesus did not endorse the afterlife depicted in the parable as literally existing, but instead is using the Pharisee's own afterlife imagery in order to deliver a prophecy about their coming rejection of him. Bullinger states:

It is not called a parable because it cites a notable example of the Pharisee's tradition which had been brought from Babylon.

==== A parable against the Sadducees ====
The parable has also been interpreted as a satirical attack on the Sadducees. The Rich Man is identified as the Sadducees on similar lines as Cox, noting the Rich Man's wearing of purple and fine linen, priestly dress and identifying his five brothers as the five sons of Annas. Proponents also note that Abraham's statement that "If they hear not Moses and the prophets, neither will they be persuaded, if one rise from the dead." fits the Sadducees' rejection of the Prophetical books of the Bible as well as their disbelief in a resurrection of the dead. This explanation was popularized in France in the 1860s–1890s by its inclusion in the notes of the pictorial Bible of Abbé Drioux.

==== Perry: a parable of a new covenant ====
Anglican theologian Simon Perry has argued that the Lazarus of the parable (an abbreviated transcript of "Eleazer") refers to Eliezer of Damascus, Abraham's servant. In Genesis 15—a foundational covenant text familiar to any first century Jew—God says to Abraham "this man will not be your heir" (Gen 15:4). Perry argues that this is why Lazarus is outside the gates of Abraham's perceived descendant. By inviting Lazarus to Abraham's bosom, Jesus is redefining the nature of the covenant. It also explains why the rich man assumes Lazarus is Abraham's servant.

==== Justus Knecht: a parable of the future life ====
The Catholic German theologian Justus Knecht (d. 1921), states that this parable gives "a glimpse of the future state, both for our consolation and as a warning." Because after this life there is "a life where everything is quite different from what it is on earth. Lazarus was poor, despised, racked with pain and hunger while he was on earth; but when he died, angels carried his soul to the abode of the just, where he received consolation." However the rich man who when on earth, "led what was apparently a magnificent life. He was esteemed and honoured, surrounded by flatterers, waited on by a host of servants, clad in costly clothes, and he feasted luxuriously every day. But all this magnificence lasted only a short time. He died and was lost for ever, and has been for centuries suffering unspeakable torments." Knecht also reflects on why the rich man was condemned: "Because he was a sensual man, an epicurean, and religion was a matter of no consideration with him. His only thought was how to lead a pleasant life, and he neither troubled himself about the future, nor believed in a coming Redeemer. He led a life without prayer, without fear of hell or desire for heaven, a life without grace and without God."

== Afterlife doctrine ==
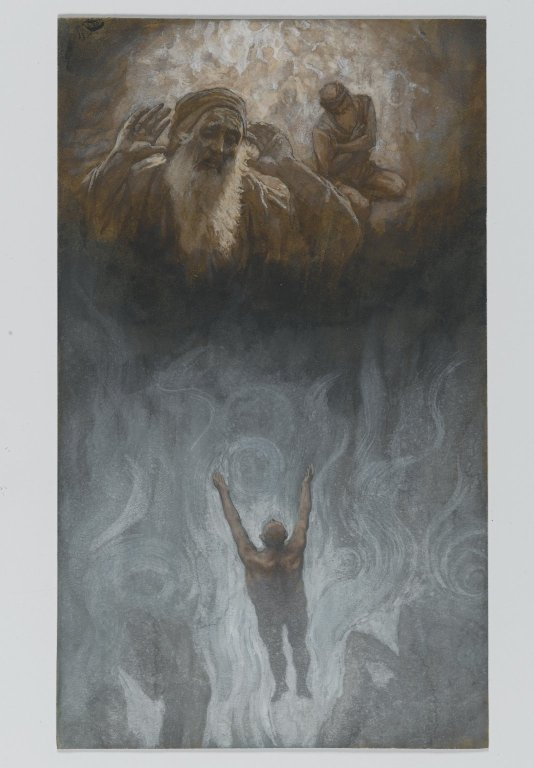
A depiction of the rich man in torment by James Tissot

The parable teaches in this particular case that both identity and memory remain after death for the soul of the one in a hell. Most Christians believe in the immortality of the soul and particular judgment and see the story as consistent with it, or even refer to it to establish these doctrines as St. Irenaeus, an Early Church father, did.

Some Christians believe in the mortality of the soul ("Christian mortalism" or "soul sleep") and general judgment ("Last Judgment") only. This view is held by some Anglicans such as E. W. Bullinger. Christian Mortalists instead argue that this is a parable using the framework of Jewish views of the Bosom of Abraham, and is metaphorical, and is not definitive teaching on the intermediate state for several reasons. For instance, they point out that Lazarus is never said to be righteous or the rich man to be wicked. Indeed, when Abraham confronts the rich man, he doesn't accuse him of any sin, but instead of merely being comfortable, while Lazarus was tormented, and that now their fortunes are reversed, which Christian mortalists would argue shows that the story is more about the reversal of fortunes motif than an explanation of the afterlife. In Revelation 20:13–14 hades is itself thrown into the "lake of fire" after being emptied of the dead.

== Literary provenance and legacy ==
=== Jewish sources ===
We have in fact one of the cases where the background to the teaching is more probably found in non-biblical sources.

— I. Howard Marshall, The New International Greek Testament Commentary: The Gospel of Luke, p. 634

Some scholars—e.g., G. B. Caird, Joachim Jeremias, Marshall, Hugo Gressmann,—suggest the basic storyline of The Rich Man and Lazarus was derived from Jewish stories that had developed from an Egyptian folk tale about Si-Osiris. Richard Bauckham is less sure, adding:

In any case, [Jesus] has used [motifs also found in the Egyptian and Jewish stories] to construct a new story, which as a whole is not the same as any other extant story. ...[Of course] comparison with the way they function in other stories can help to highlight their function in the parable. In this sense, the parallels and contrasts with the Egyptian and Jewish story of the rich and the poor man can be instructive...

Steven Cox highlights other elements from Jewish myths that the parable could be mimicking.

=== Legacy in Early Christianity and Medieval tradition ===
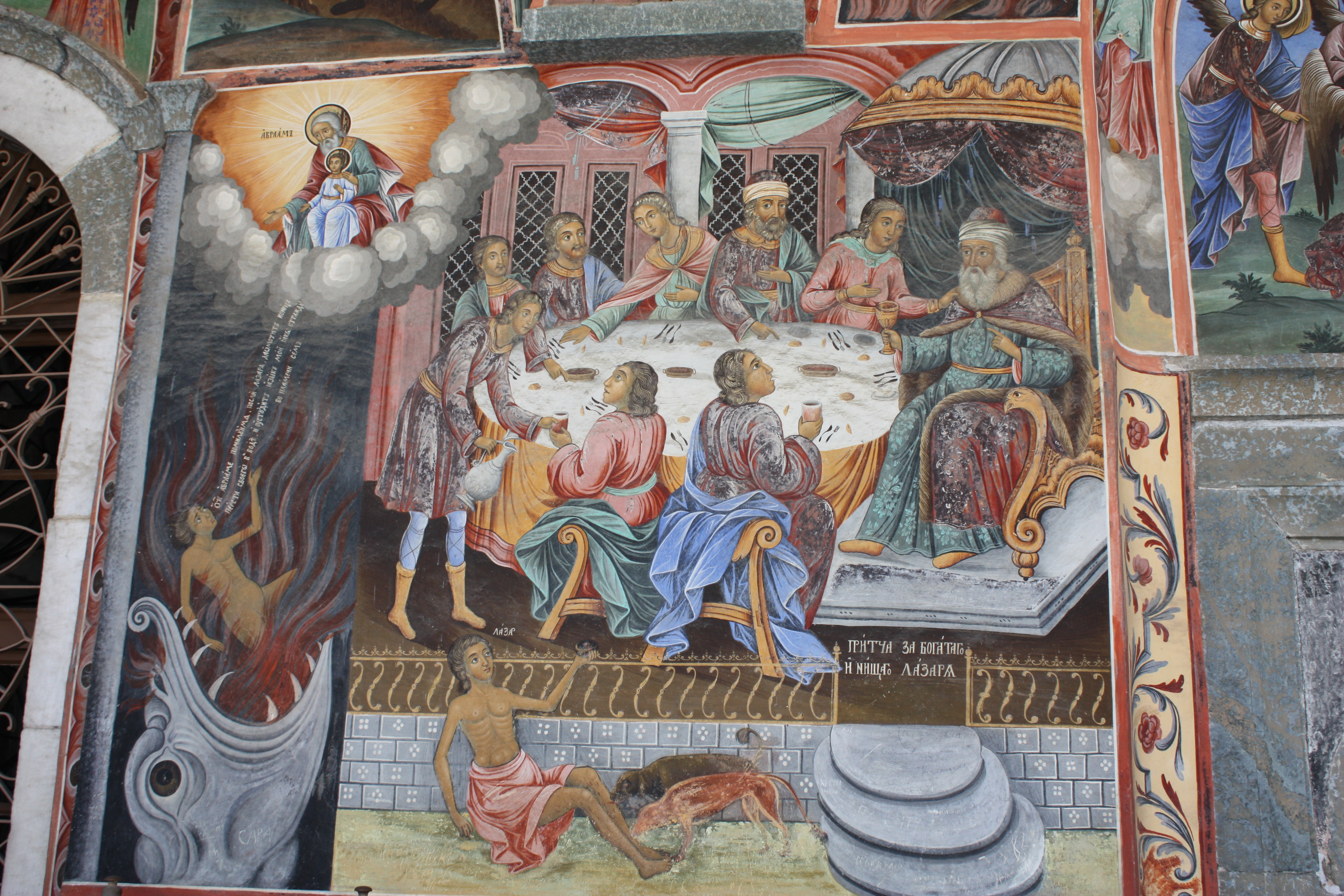
Fresco of Lazarus and the Rich Man at the Rila Monastery.

Hippolytus of Rome (ca. AD 200) describes Hades with similar details: the bosom of Abraham for the souls of the righteous, fiery torment for the souls of wicked, and a chasm between them. He equates the fires of Hades with the lake of fire described in the Book of Revelation, but specifies that no one will actually be cast into the fire until the end times.

In some European countries, the Latin description dīves (Latin for "the rich man") is treated as his proper name: Dives. In Italy, the description epulone (Italian for "banquetter") is also used as a proper name. Both descriptions appear together, but not as a proper name, in Peter Chrysologus's sermon De divite epulone (Latin "On the Rich Banquetter"), corresponding to the verse, "There was a rich man who was clothed in purple and fine linen and who feasted sumptuously every day".

The story was frequently told in an elaborated form in the medieval period, treating it as factual rather than a parable. Lazarus was venerated as a patron saint of lepers. In the 12th century, crusaders in the Kingdom of Jerusalem founded the Order of Saint Lazarus.

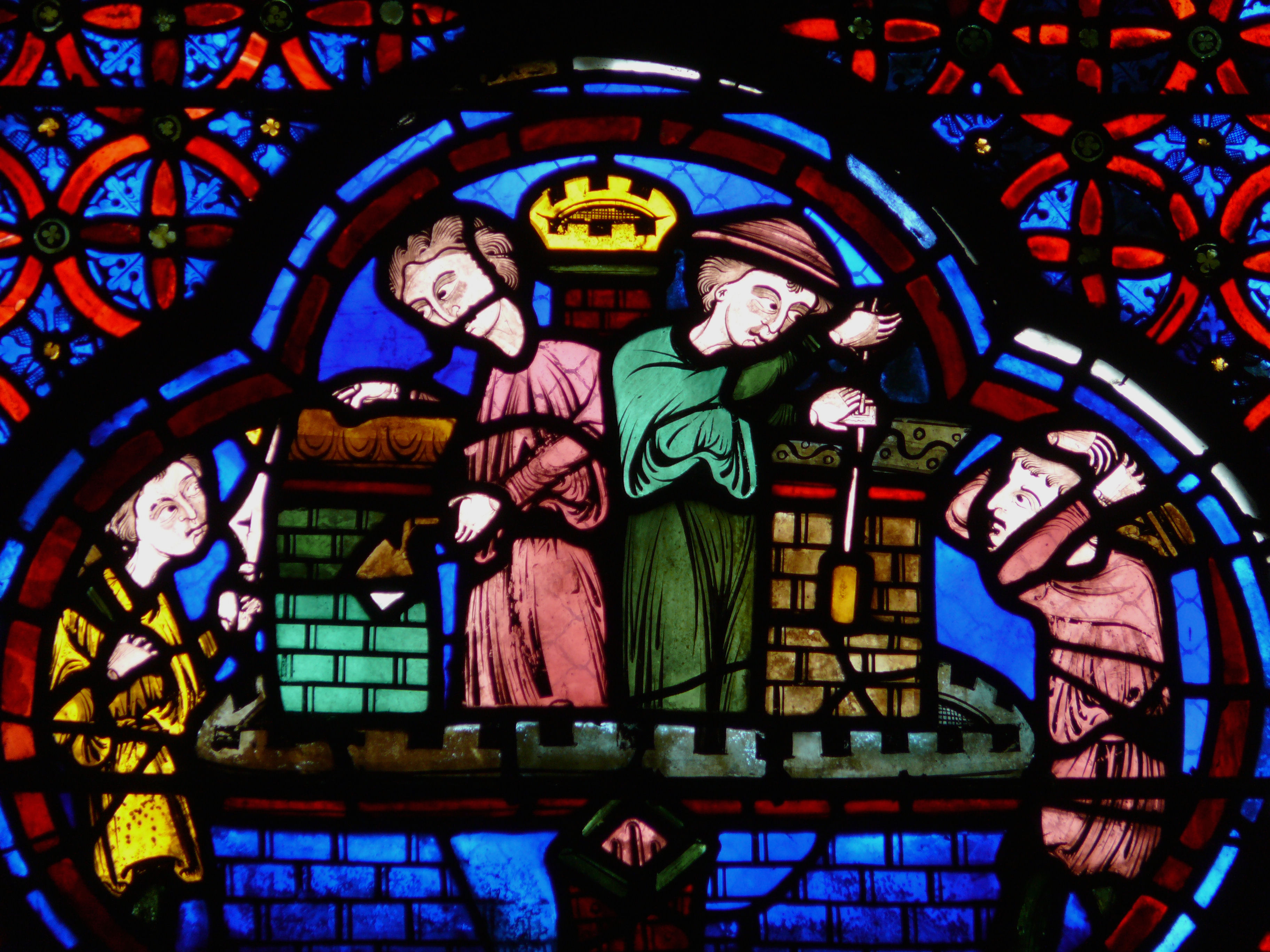

The story was often shown in art, especially carved at the portals of churches, at the foot of which beggars would sit (for example at Moissac and Saint-Sernin, Toulouse), pleading their cause. There is a surviving stained-glass window at Bourges Cathedral.

In the Latin liturgy of the Roman Catholic Church, the words of In paradisum are sometimes chanted as the deceased is taken from church to burial, including this supplication: "Chorus angelorum te suscipiat ... et cum Lazaro quondam paupere aeternam habeas requiem" (May the ranks of angels receive you ... and with Lazarus, who was once poor, may you have eternal rest").

== Conflation with Lazarus of Bethany ==
The name "Lazarus" (from the Hebrew: אלעזר, Elʿāzār, Eleazar, "God is my help") also appears in the Gospel of John, in which Jesus resurrects Lazarus of Bethany four days after his death.

Historically within Christianity, the begging Lazarus of the parable (feast day 21 June) and Lazarus of Bethany (feast day 29 July) have sometimes been conflated, with some churches celebrating a blessing of dogs, associated with the beggar, on 17 December, date previously associated with Lazarus of Bethany in Roman Catholicism.

Romanesque iconography carved on portals in Burgundy and Provence might be indicative of such a conflation. For example, at the west portal of the Church of St. Trophime at Arles, the beggar Lazarus is enthroned as St. Lazarus. Similar examples are found at the church at Avallon, the central portal at Vézelay, and the portals of the cathedral of Autun.

A minority of commentators, such as the French priest Abbé Drioux, believe that the Lazarus of the parable is in fact connected with Lazarus of Bethany because of the coincidences between the two characters.

== In literature and poetry ==
Geoffrey Chaucer's Summoner observes that "Dives and Lazarus lived differently, and their rewards were different."

In William Shakespeare's Henry IV, Part 1, Sir John Falstaff alludes to the story while insulting his friend Bardolph about his face, comparing it to a memento mori: "I never see thy face," he says "but I think upon hell-fire and Dives that lived in purple; for there he is in his robes, burning, burning" (III, 3, 30–33). When recalling the death of Falstaff in Henry V the description of Lazarus in heaven ("into Abraham's bosom") is parodied as "He's in Arthur's bosom, if ever man went to Arthur's bosom." (II. 3, 7–8)

References to Dives and Lazarus are a frequent image in socially conscious fiction of the Victorian period. For example:

"workers and masters are separate as Dives and Lazarus" "ay, as separate as Dives and Lazarus, with a great gulf betwixt" (Elizabeth Gaskell; Mary Barton a tale of Manchester life 1848)
"Between them, and a working woman full of faults, there is a deep gulf set." (Charles Dickens; Hard Times 1854)

Although Dickens' A Christmas Carol and The Chimes do not make any direct reference to the story, the introduction to the Oxford edition of the Christmas Books does.

In Herman Melville's Moby-Dick, Ishmael describes a windswept and cold night from the perspective of Lazarus ("Poor Lazarus, chattering his teeth against the curbstone...") and Dives ("...the privilege of making my own summer with my own coals").

The poem "The Love Song of J. Alfred Prufrock" by T. S. Eliot contains the lines: 'To say: "I am Lazarus, come from the dead,/Come back to tell you all, I shall tell you all"' in reference to Dives' request to have Beggar Lazarus return from the dead to tell his brothers of his fate. But this confuses the "Dives and Lazarus" parable with the story of Jesus raising a different person called Lazarus from the dead: in the Gospel of John, chapter 11, verses 1 to 44.

Richard Crashaw wrote a metaphysical stanza for his Steps to the Temple in 1646 entitled, "Upon Lazarus His Tears":

Rich Lazarus! richer in those gems, thy tears,
Than Dives in the robes he wears:
He scorns them now, but oh they'll suit full well
With the purple he must wear in hell.

Dives and Lazarus appear in Edith Sitwell's poem "Still falls the Rain" from "The Canticle of the Rose", first published in 1941. It was written after The Blitz on London in 1940. The poem is dark, full of the disillusions of World War II. It speaks of the failure of man, but also of God's continuing involvement in the world through Christ:

Still falls the Rain
At the feet of the Starved Man hung upon the Cross.
Christ that each day, each night, nails there, have mercy on us—
On Dives and on Lazarus:
Under the Rain the sore and the gold are as one.

== In music ==
"Vater Abraham, erbarme dich mein", SWV 477 ("Dialogus divites Epulonis cum Abrahamo"), a work by Heinrich Schütz, is a setting of the dialog between Abraham and the rich man dating to the 1620s. It is notable for its virtuosic text-painting of the flames of hell, as well as being an important example of the "dialog" as a step towards the development of the oratorio.

"Dives Malus" (the wicked rich man) also known as "Historia Divitis" (c. 1640) by Giacomo Carissimi is a Latin paraphrase of the Luke text, set as an oratorio for 2 sopranos, tenor, bass; for private performance in the oratories of Rome in the 1640s. Mensch, was du tust a German sacred concerto by Johann Philipp Förtsch (1652–1732).

The story appeared as an English folk song whose oldest written documentation dates from 1557, with the depiction of the afterlife altered to fit Christian tradition. The song was also published as the Child Ballad Dives and Lazarus in the 19th century. Ralph Vaughan Williams based his orchestral piece Five Variants of Dives and Lazarus (1939) on this folk song, and also used an arrangement as the hymn tune Kingsfold. Benjamin Britten set Edith Sitwell's poem "Still Falls the Rain" (above) to music in his third Canticle in a series of five.

Alternative rock band Flyleaf's song "Chasm," from their 2009 release Memento Mori, is based on the parable.

== Order of Saint Lazarus of Jerusalem ==
The Order of Saint Lazarus of Jerusalem is an order of chivalry that originated in a leper hospital founded by Knights Hospitaller in the 12th century by Crusaders of the Latin Kingdom of Jerusalem. The Order of Saint Lazarus is one of the most ancient of the European orders of chivalry, yet is one of the less-known and less-documented orders. The first mention of the Order of Saint Lazarus in surviving sources dates to 1142.

The order was originally established to treat the virulent disease of leprosy, its knights originally being lepers themselves. According to the modern-day order's official international website, "From its foundation in the 12th century, the members of the Order were dedicated to two ideals: aid to those suffering from the dreadful disease of leprosy and the defense of the Christian faith." Sufferers of leprosy regarded the beggar Lazarus (of Luke 16:19–31) as their patron saint and usually dedicated their hospices to him.

The order was initially founded as a leper hospital outside the city walls of Jerusalem, but hospitals were established all across the Holy Land dependent on the Jerusalem hospital, notably in Acre. It is unknown when the order became militarised, but militarisation occurred before the end of the 12th century due to the large numbers of Templars and Hospitallers sent to the leper hospitals to be treated. The order established 'lazar houses' across Europe to care for lepers, and it was well supported by other military orders, which compelled lazar brethren in their rule to join the Order of Saint Lazarus upon contracting leprosy.

== See also ==
- New Jerusalem
- Lazaretto
- Life of Jesus in the New Testament
- Luke 16
- Ministry of Jesus
- The Sheep and the Goats
