= Penholder =

Penholder may refer to:

- Penhold, a type of table tennis grip
- "Penholder" (song), an alternative rock song
- The Penholder, a novel by Elin Wägner
- Penholder (United Nations), members of the United Nations Security Council with informal responsibility for an area of concern
