= Captivate =

Captivate may refer to:

- Adobe Captivate, software for creating eLearning content
- Captivate Entertainment, an American film production company
- Captivate Network, an American digital media company
- USS Captivate, an American World War II minesweeper

== See also ==
- Captivated (disambiguation)
- Captivating, a 2005 book by John and Stasi Eldredge
- Captivation, a 1931 British romantic comedy film
