= Captivated =

Captivated may refer to:

- Captivated: The Trials of Pamela Smart, a 2014 American documentary film
- Too Good to Be True (2024 TV series), also known as Captivated, a 2024 British psychological thriller
- Captivated, by You, a 2019 Japanese manga
- "Captivated", a song by IV of Spades from the 2019 album ClapClapClap!

== See also ==
- Captivate (disambiguation)
