= Memento Mori (Flyleaf album) =

Studio album by Flyleaf
- Released: November 10, 2009
- Recorded: June 2008 – August 2009
- Genre: Post-grunge; alternative metal
- Length: 44:03
- Label: A&M/Octone
- Producer: Howard Benson

Flyleaf chronology
Much Like Falling EP (2007)	Memento Mori (2009)	Remember to Live (2010)

Singles from Memento Mori
- 1. "Again" Released: August 25, 2009; 2. "Beautiful Bride" Released: October 6, 2009; 3. "Missing" Released: April 5, 2010; 4. "Chasm" Released: September 27, 2010; 5. "Arise" Released: December 14, 2010

Memento Mori is the second studio album by American rock band Flyleaf, released through A&M/Octone Records on November 10, 2009. The title is a Latin phrase meaning "be mindful of death" or "remember you will die". Memento Mori debuted at number eight on the Billboard 200, selling 56,000 units in its opening week. It also became the first album by a female-led act to top the Billboard Hard Rock Albums chart. The album sold more than 311,600 copies in the U.S. in a little over one year.

== Background ==
Memento Mori is the follow-up to their 2005 platinum debut. It contains 14 songs, which were selected out of 18 already written. The band reunited with producer Howard Benson to make the album. The album was recorded at Bay7 Studios in Los Angeles, California. It was released on November 10, 2009. The band debuted two songs, "Chasm" and "Circle", from Memento Mori live during a small acoustic tour in Afghanistan for United States Troops.

=== Writing ===
The band began writing new music after their debut album was released. Most of the material was written while the band toured, but some songs date back as early as 2005 and 2006. "In The Dark" was written after the band released Flyleaf, though it was never played live. "Again", "Have We Lost", and "Beautiful Bride" were the first songs to be played live before they were released on the album.

"Again", the first single from Memento Mori, was released to radio and digital retail stores August 25, 2009. Meiert Avis directed the music video for "Again", released at midnight September 30, 2009, on MTV. Don Tyler directed the music video for "Beautiful Bride", released October 6, 2009. Diane Martel directed the music video for "Missing", released March 18, 2010. Giles Timms directed, animated and illustrated the animated viral music video for "Chasm", released on September 22, 2010.

The album premiered on the official Flyleaf MySpace page on November 6, 2009.

== Promotion ==
To promote the album, the band partnered with the online calendar service Eventful for a series of fan-voted listening parties in various American cities, where they previewed songs from the album as well as music videos. There were eight such events beginning on September 28, 2009.

== Reception ==
Professional ratings
Aggregate scores
Source	Rating
Metacritic	(69/100)
Review scores
Source	Rating
AllMusic	3.5/5 stars
Alternative Press	3/5 stars
Entertainment Weekly	(B)
Jesus Freak Hideout	3.5/5 stars
The New York Times	(favorable)
Sputnikmusic	3/5 stars
Type 3 Media	8.5/10 stars

Memento Mori currently holds generally favorable reviews on Metacritic with a 69.

== Track listing ==
Standard Edition
No.	Title	Length
0.	"Uncle Bobby" (hidden pre-gap track)	4:22
1.	"Beautiful Bride"	3:03
2.	"Again"	3:05
3.	"Chasm"	2:54
4.	"Missing"	2:54
5.	"This Close"	3:20
6.	"The Kind"	2:47
7.	"In The Dark"	3:47
8.	"Set Apart This Dream"	3:15
9.	"Swept Away"	4:09
10.	"Tiny Heart"	3:07
11.	"Melting (Interlude)"	0:57
12.	"Treasure"	3:24
13.	"Circle"	3:03
14.	"Arise"	4:18
Total length:		44:03

=== Bonus tracks ===
Expanded Edition Bonus Disc
No.	Title	Length
15.	"Break Your Knees"	4:26
16.	"Enemy"	3:43
17.	"Have We Lost"	2:56
18.	"Who Am I"	2:37
Total length:		57:45

iTunes Bonus Tracks
No.	Title	Length
16.	"Stay (U2 Cover)" (Released On "The Target Red Room Vol. 5")	4:53
17.	"Bitter Sweet" (Pre-Order Exclusive)	4:03

Amazon MP3 Bonus Track
No.	Title	Length
16.	"Tina" (From Much Like Falling EP)	2:31

Rhapsody Bonus Track
No.	Title	Length
16.	"Supernatural (Acoustic)" (From Much Like Falling EP)	4:25

Walmart.com Bonus Track
No.	Title	Length
16.	"Justice and Mercy" (From Much Like Falling EP)	2:34

== Track notes ==
- "Tiny Heart" is a re-worked demo of a song that was written in the mid-2000s, before the release of Flyleaf's debut album.
- "Again" and "Have We Lost" were written in 2007 and often performed live. These songs underwent lyrical changes during the Memento Mori sessions.
- "Uncle Bobby" is a hidden track that is placed before "Beautiful Bride". The song can be heard by rewinding the disc to -4:28. On digital versions of the album, the song is track 15, after "Arise".
- "Set Apart This Dream" was inspired by the best-selling, inspirational John Eldredge book Wild at Heart.
- "Treasure" was written about Lacey's engagement to Joshua Sturm.
- The expanded edition bonus track "Enemy" was used during the opening segment of the season 5 Criminal Minds episode "Risky Business".

== Charts ==
=== Weekly charts ===
Chart (2009)	Peak position
UK Album Downloads (OCC)	95
UK Rock & Metal Albums (OCC)	23
US Billboard 200	8
US Top Alternative Albums (Billboard)	1
US Top Christian Albums (Billboard)	1
US Top Hard Rock Albums (Billboard)	1
US Top Rock Albums (Billboard)	2
US Indie Store Album Sales (Billboard)	4

=== Year-end charts ===
Chart (2010)	Position
US Billboard 200	166
US Christian Albums (Billboard)	5
US Top Rock Albums (Billboard)	44

== Awards ==
The album was nominated for a Dove Award for Rock Album of the Year at the 42nd GMA Dove Awards.

== Personnel ==
Band

- Lacey Sturm – lead vocals
- Sameer Bhattacharya – lead guitar
- Jared Hartmann – rhythm guitar
- James Culpepper – drums, percussion, timpani, and wind chimes
- Pat Seals – bass, cover art

Production

- Howard Benson – production
- Chris Lord-Alge – mixing
- Dave McNair – mastering
- Mike Plotnikoff – audio engineer
- Hatsukazu "Hatch" Inagaki – audio engineer
- Mark Lewis – audio engineer (1–3)
- Jeremy Underwood – assistant engineer
- Keith Armstrong – assistant mixing
- Nik Karpen – assistant mixing
- Andrew Schubert – additional engineer
- Brad Townsend – additional engineer
- Paul DeCarli – digital editing

Additional personnel

- Howard Benson – keyboards, programming
- Ben Berkman – A&R
- James Diener – A&R
- Josh Sturm – art direction
- Sean Evans – art direction
- Mark Holthusean – artwork
- Mark Lewis – additional guitars, additional vocals (1–3)
