= Flyleaf (EP) =

EP by Flyleaf
- Released: October 26, 2004
- Genre: Alternative metal
- Length: 11:54
- Label: Octone; BMG
- Producer: Bradley Cook; Flyleaf; Mark Lewis; Rick Parashar

Flyleaf chronology
Flyleaf (2004)	Flyleaf (2005)

Singles from Flyleaf
- 1. "Breathe Today" Released: 2004

Professional ratings
Review scores
Source	Rating
Jesus Freak Hideout	4/5 stars

Flyleaf is the self-titled debut extended play by American rock band Flyleaf.

== Track listing ==
All tracks are written by Lacey Mosley, James Culpepper, Sameer Bhattacharya, Jared Hartmann, Pat Seals

2004 original
No.	Title	Length
1.	"Red Sam"	3:19
2.	"Breathe Today"	2:53
3.	"I'm Sorry"	2:45
4.	"Cassie"	2:57

2007 re-release
No.	Title	Length
1.	"I'm So Sick"	3:46
2.	"Fully Alive"	2:48
3.	"Breathe Today"	2:53
4.	"I'm Sorry"	2:45
5.	"Cassie"	2:57
6.	"Red Sam"	3:19
7.	"Breathe Today" (video)	2:53
Total length:		18:28

== Personnel ==
Credits adapted from liner notes

Band

- Lacey Mosley – lead vocals
- James Culpepper – drums
- Sameer Bhattacharya – guitar
- Jared Hartmann – guitar
- Pat Seals – bass

Production (2004)

- Rick Parashar – producer (track: 1)
- Kevin "Caveman" Shirley – mixing (track: 1)
- Bradley Cook – producer, mixing (tracks: 2–4)
- Chaz Harper – mastering

Production (2005)

- Mark Lewis – producer (tracks: 1 & 2)
- Flyleaf – producer (tracks: 1 & 2)
- Joe West – mixing (tracks: 1 & 2)
- Leon Zervos – mastering
- Andy Vandette – mastering

== Release history ==
Region	Date	Label	Format	Catalogue
United States	October 26, 2004	Octone; BMG	CD	82376-50057-2
United States	May 31, 2005	Octone; Sony BMG	CD	82376-50058-2
United States	December 11, 2007	A&M Octone	CD; Digital download	82376-50058
