= Captivating =

2005 book by John and Stasi Eldredge

- Author: John Eldredge and Stasi Eldredge
- Language: English
- Publisher: Thomas Nelson
- Publication date: 2005
- Publication place: United States
- Media type: Print
- Pages: 243
- OCLC: 57192994

Captivating: Unveiling the Mystery of a Woman's Soul is a book published in 2005 by John Eldredge and his wife Stasi. The book rejects the idea of an ideal woman and explores biblical scripture from the view that God desires woman to embrace, rather than fear, her femininity. Captivating is a companion to Wild at Heart, also by John Eldredge, and argues that its model of femininity complements men's innate desires for "a battle to fight," "an adventure to live," and "a beauty to rescue." They claim that women have three core desires: "to be romanced, to play an irreplaceable role in a great adventure, and to unveil beauty".

The authors use scriptural analysis, personal experience and interviews with others as the basis for their argument, along with pop culture references to romance fiction. They also claim that God made woman as the "Crown of Creation", an embodiment of God's beauty, mystery, and vulnerability.

The book has received considerable criticism from people both within and outside the Christian sphere. Many argue that the authors' personal experiences add too much bias to a book intended to address wide human conditions, while others find fault with the authors' scriptural analyses.
