= Sorrow =

Sorrow may refer to:

- Sorrow (emotion)

== Music ==
- The Sorrow, an Austrian metalcore/melodic death band
- The Sorrows, a 1960s English freakbeat band
- Sorrows (album), a 2025 album by Cwfen
- The Sorrow (album), a 2010 album by The Sorrow
- "Sorrow", a song by Black Veil Brides from Vindicate (2026)
- "Sorrow", a song by Box Car Racer from Box Car Racer (2002)
- "Sorrow", a song by Life Without Buildings from Any Other City (2001)
- "Sorrow" (Bad Religion song), 2001
- "Sorrow" (Pink Floyd song), 1987
- "Sorrow" (The McCoys song), also covered by The Merseys and David Bowie

== Other ==
- Sorrow (Van Gogh), an 1882 drawing by Vincent van Gogh
- The Sorrow (Metal Gear), a fictional character in the Metal Gear video game series
