= Chasm (song) =

Single by Flyleaf

from the album Memento Mori
- Released: September 27, 2010
- Recorded: Los Angeles, California
- Genre: Alternative metal; Christian metal
- Length: 2:53
- Label: A&M Octone
- Songwriters: Sameer Bhattacharya; James Culpepper; Jared Hartmann; Lacey Mosley; Kirkpatrick Seals; Josh Sturm

Flyleaf singles chronology
"Missing" (2010)	"Chasm" (2010)	"Arise" (2010)

Music video
- "Chasm" on YouTube

"Chasm" is the fourth single by Flyleaf from their second album, Memento Mori. The song was officially available for digital download on September 27, 2010.

== Content ==
Chasm is based on the New Testament parable of The Rich Man and Lazarus. In the parable, the rich man dies and goes to hell. From hell, he looks up to Heaven and sees Lazarus, a beggar who had scrounged crumbs from underneath his table, sitting next to the Jewish patriarch Abraham. The rich man begs Abraham to allow Lazarus to dip his finger in water and come down to hell to soothe his burning tongue. This is impossible because of a wide chasm between Heaven and hell. The rich man then begs Abraham to send Lazarus back to Earth to warn the rich man's brothers to follow the Law of God so that they won't end up next to him in hell. This request is also denied. Abraham responds that his brothers have the words of Moses and the prophets. If they won't believe Moses or the prophets, they won't believe Lazarus even if he returns from the dead.

== Music video ==
Giles Timms directed, animated and illustrated the animated music video for Chasm. The music video premiered on Vevo on September 22, 2010.

== Letters from the Commander/History of Memento Mori ==
3.16.01 Chasm (third part of the History of Memento Mori)

While the enemy was losing the battle today, they cried out to us, "Memento Mori, we are human too! We are in pain and we are dying!". I answered them, hoping they would listen, "Break off your pact with the Dread Army! That is what is killing you! Walk away and take your life back! I know it's all you've ever known, and walking away will leave a wound, but it will heal! When it does, do not enter into your pact with the vultures again! You don't have to be slaves to death! We've come to bring the truth of freedom! You were meant to be free!" But they wouldn't listen and kept crying out, "Please give me something! I'm so thirsty." I tried again with more urgency. "If you die here this way, you will have wasted your life on death and you will have never lived! Once you die here, the chasm will be fixed and you can never undo it. Turn from death and drink this life-giving water we are offering you!" The battle continued to rage, some turning and joining the Passerby Army, others dying.

== Chart performance ==
Chart (2010)	Peak position
US Mainstream Rock Songs (Billboard)	26
US Rock Songs (Billboard)	48
