= Beautiful Outlaw =

2011 book by John Eldredge

- Author: John Eldredge
- Language: English
- Publisher: FaithWords
- Publication date: 2011
- Publication place: United States
- Media type: Print
- Pages: 242 pp
- ISBN: 978-0-89296-088-0

Beautiful Outlaw is a book by John Eldredge published in 2011, on the subject of the personality of Jesus Christ. Its subtitle is Experiencing the Playful, Disruptive, Extravagant Personality of Jesus. The book's jacket flap begins, "Reading the Gospels without knowing the personality of Jesus is like watching television with the sound turned off."

The book's 17 chapters include "The Playfulness of God and the Poison of Religion," "The Missing Essential--His Personality," "The Most Human Face of All," and "Clearing Away the Religious Fog."

John Eldredge is a New York Times bestelling author. He leads Ransomed Heart Ministries, a non-profit.
