= Sorrows (album) =

Studio album by Cwfen
- Released: 30 May 2025
- Studio: Deep Storm
- Genre: Post-punk, doom metal
- Length: 43:42
- Label: New Heavy Sounds
- Producer: Cwfen; Kevin Hare

Singles from Sorrows
- 1. "Reliks" Released: 1 November 2024; 2. "Wolfsbane" Released: 11 March 2025

Sorrows is the debut studio album by Scottish doom metal band Cwfen. It was released on 30 May 2025, through New Heavy Sounds.

Mastered by James Plotkin, it consists of ten tracks with a total runtime of approximately forty-three minutes. Seven tracks range between four and six minutes each, while the remaining three "Fragment" tracks are under a minute each. The album was produced by Kevin Hare and the band, composed of lead vocalist Agnes Alder, guitarist Guy DeNuit, drummer Rös Ranquinn, and bassist Mary Thomas Baker. The first single, "Reliks", was released on 1 November 2024. It was followed by "Wolfsbane", the second single, on 11 March 2025.

== Reception ==
Professional ratings
Review scores
Source	Rating
Distorted Sound	9/10 stars
Kerrang!	4/5 stars
Metal Hammer	8/10 stars

Liz Scarlett of Metal Hammer noted in her review of the album, "Sorrows is charged with the same blackly brooding lifeblood as Type O Negative, offering macabre meditations on mortality and sensuality through mystifying post-punk, chest-crushing doom and haunted atmospheres," describing it as "a deeply powerful album, full of spectral beauty," and rating it eight out of ten.

Sam Law of Kerrang! referred to the album as "an unapologetically audacious first statement from musicians who've so obviously spent years toiling in shadow," giving it a score of four out of five. Distorted Sound assigned it a rating of nine out of ten and remarked, "Sorrows ensnares with every moment like an elegant and captivating siren song, enchanting with a portent of doom underpinning the top notes." Decibel described Sorrows as "at turns rage-filled, hypnotic and eternally dark."

== Track listing ==
All lyrics are written by Agnes Alder; "Fragment I", "Fragment II", and "Fragment III" are instrumentals.

Sorrows track listing
No.	Title	Music	Length
1.	"Fragment I"	Mary Tomas Baker	0:34
2.	"Bodies"	Alder; Guy deNuit	6:49
3.	"Wolfsbane"	Alder; deNuit	6:33
4.	"Reliks"	Alder; deNuit	5:48
5.	"Whispers"	Alder; deNuit	5:31
6.	"Fragment II"	Baker	0:58
7.	"Penance"	Alder; deNuit	5:41
8.	"Fragment III"	Baker	0:38
9.	"Embers"	Alder; deNuit	6:55
10.	"Rite"	Alder; deNuit	4:15
Total length:			43:42

== Personnel ==
Credits adapted from Decibel and Tidal.

=== Cwfen ===
- Agnes Alder – vocals, guitar, production
- Mary Thomas Baker – bass, production
- Guy deNuit – guitar, production
- Rös Ranquinn – drums, production

=== Additional contributors ===
- Kevin Hare – production
- James Plotkin – mastering
