= Again (Flyleaf song) =

2009 single by Flyleaf

Single by Flyleaf

from the album Memento Mori
- Released: August 25, 2009
- Recorded: Los Angeles, California
- Genre: Post-grunge
- Length: 3:09
- Label: A&M Octone
- Songwriters: Sameer Bhattacharya; James Culpepper; Jared Hartmann; Mark T. Lewis; Lacey Sturm; Pat Seals
- Producer: Howard Benson

Flyleaf singles chronology
"There for You" (2008)	"Again" (2009)	"Beautiful Bride" (2009)

Audio sample
- file; help

Music video
- "Again" on YouTube

"Again" is the first single by Flyleaf from their second album, Memento Mori. It was announced on July 29, 2009, that "Again" would be hitting radio August 25, 2009. The song was added to the play lists on Flyleaf's official site and the band's official Myspace page on August 19, 2009. The song was officially available for digital download on August 25, 2009. It is also featured in iPhone application Tap Tap Revenge 2, is downloadable content for Rock Band 2 and is a playable track in Guitar Hero: Warriors of Rock and Power Gig: Rise of the SixString.

== Performances ==
The song debuted in early 2007 along with the song "Have We Lost" while Flyleaf was on tour, playing songs from their self-titled debut album Flyleaf. In mid-2009, the lyrics to the song changed, and lead singer Lacey Mosley explain why in a letter written to fans.

"The fans seem to know what's happening with us before we do and I'm not surprised to find out many have known the lyrics to Again for a year now. :-) The first verse and chorus did change in the studio! It is a good thing, because the words say better what my heart meant. It is written for people like me, who feel a restlessness to make the world better somehow, but are much too small to carry the weight of the world on their shoulders. Its to say, you have the right heart, but you weren't meant to carry it all. You are so strong, you are able to handle so much! But you can't handle everything all at once. Let go! God's big and He can handle it all better than you! Its okay to let go and not understand everything. I should start a control freak support group… Anyone interested? Maybe this song will help us. I sing it to myself 'Only surrender will help you now..' And then I let go."

— - Lacey Sturm

== Music video ==
The music video for "Again" premiered on MTV on September 30, 2009. The director of the video is Meiert Avis. The woodcuts in the video were created by bassist Pat Seals, who also designed all the artwork for Memento Mori.

== Letters from the Commander/History of Memento Mori ==
11.4.00 Again (Part Two of the History of Memento Mori)

As I looked over the battlefield today, I was reminded of what we were fighting for. I thought of all of my loved ones. When I started thinking about my daughter, I was overwhelmed. She can be so much like me...the way her heart breaks with every injustice. She prays like everything depends on God, but then lives like it all depends on her. Even though she's strong, there are times when she tries to carry all the weight of the world on her own and she ends up crushed, brought to her knees. As she cries out for relief, she will finally let go, surrendering all of the burden by believing that everything has a purpose and will work out for good... It's only here that she finds the air to breathe again. I wish she would come to this place quicker sometimes. So often she feels guilty for not being able to hold it all herself, but if she only knew how wonderful she is. I've written several times to remind her of these things, but I haven't gotten a response in a month.

== Charts ==
=== Weekly charts ===
Chart (2010)	Peak position
US Hot Christian Songs (Billboard)	26
US Hot Rock & Alternative Songs (Billboard)	12

=== Year-end charts ===
Chart (2010)	Position
US Hot Rock & Alternative Songs (Billboard)	26
