= Divine incomprehensibility =

Theological doctrine

In Abrahamic religions, the doctrine of divine incomprehensibility says that God is not able to be fully known. Isaiah 40:28 says "his understanding no one can fathom". Most theologians will balance this by saying that God is able to be known in some ways.

== In Christianity ==
Protestant theologians are usually quick to clarify that we are able to know God, since God reveals himself to us. R. C. Sproul notes, "Theologically speaking, to say God is incomprehensible is not to say that God is utterly unknowable. It is to say that none of us can comprehend God exhaustively."

Some older English versions of the Athanasian Creed confess "the Father incomprehensible, the Son incomprehensible, and the Holy Spirit incomprehensible" as a translation of the Latin immensus. Modern English translations have "immeasurable", "infinite", or "unlimited".

Divine incomprehensibility was said to be a point of conflict in the Clark-Van Til Controversy in the Orthodox Presbyterian Church during the 1940s, but John Frame argues that the issue there was the relationship between human knowledge and divine knowledge, rather than human knowledge and the being of God.
