= Breathe Today =

- Cover for the 2004 single

Single by Flyleaf

from the album Flyleaf EP and Flyleaf
- Released: 2004
- Genre: Alternative metal
- Length: 2:53 (EP version); 2:31 (album version)
- Label: Octone
- Songwriters: Lacey Mosley; Sameer Bhattacharya; Jared Hartmann; Pat Seals; James Culpepper
- Producers: Bradley Cook; Flyleaf; Howard Benson

Flyleaf singles chronology
"Breathe Today" (2004)	"Do You Hear What I Hear?" (2005)

Music video
- "Breathe Today" on YouTube

"Breathe Today" is a song by American rock band Flyleaf. The song originally appeared on the band's self-titled EP and was released as a single in 2004 in promotion of that release. The song was re-recorded for the band's self-titled debut and that version of the song was released as a single in 2007.

== Music video ==
A music video was created for the 2004 version of the song and was directed by Dave Garcia. The video alternates between shots of vocalist Lacey Mosley wandering around a dirty bathroom and the band performing the song in a room.

== Track listing ==
Promo single

No.	Title	Length
1.	"Breathe Today"	2:53

Enhanced single

No.	Title	Length
1.	"Breathe Today"	2:53
2.	"Red Sam"	3:19
3.	"Breathe Today" (music video)	2:53

2007 single

No.	Title	Length
1.	"Breathe Today"	2:31
2.	"Fully Alive" (Acoustic)	2:16

== Personnel ==
- Lacey Mosley − vocals
- Sameer Bhattacharya − guitar
- Jared Hartmann − guitar
- Pat Seals − bass
- James Culpepper − drums

== Charts ==
Chart (2008)	Peak position
US Active Rock (Billboard)	33
US Mainstream Rock (Billboard)	36
