= Flyleaf Press =

- Parent company: Ancestor Network Ltd.
- Founded: 1987
- Founder: James Ryan
- Country of origin: Ireland
- Headquarters location: Dublin
- Key people: Jim Ryan, Managing Editor; Brian Smith, Sales
- Publication types: Books
- Nonfiction topics: Genealogy and Family history guides and references
- Official website: www.flyleaf.ie

Flyleaf Press is a publishing company based in Dublin, Ireland. It was founded in 1987 by James Ryan and publishes guides and references for Irish family history and genealogy. These include a series of guides on tracing ancestors in several counties of Ireland. Flyleaf Press is a member of CLÉ, the Irish Book Publishers' Association.
