= John Eldredge =

American Christian writer

- Born: June 6, 1960 (age 66); Los Angeles, California, U.S.
- Education: Colorado Christian University (MA); California Polytechnic University
- Occupation: author
- Website: http://www.wildatheart.org

John Eldredge (born June 6, 1960, in Los Angeles) is an American author, counselor, and lecturer on Christianity. He is known for his best-selling book Wild at Heart.

== Life and work ==
Eldredge received his undergraduate degree in theater from California Polytechnic University (Pomona) and his MA in biblical counseling from Colorado Christian University under the direction of Larry Crabb and Dan Allender. Prior to joining Focus on the Family in 1988, Eldredge served for five years on the staff of Sierra Madre Congregational Church in Southern California.

In July 2000, Eldredge left Focus on the Family, where he had worked for 12 years, to launch Ransomed Heart Ministries. John, his wife, Stasi, and their three sons live in Colorado Springs, Colorado. In addition to publishing many books, he has produced three videos: Risky Business: A Look at Gambling, Whatever Happened to Marriage?: A Look at Divorce, and Created Different?: A Look at Homosexuality.

== Bibliography ==
- The Sacred Romance: Drawing Closer to the Heart of God (1997), Nashville: Thomas Nelson, ISBN 0-7852-7342-5 [with Brent Curtis]
- Wild at Heart: Discovering the Secret of a Man's Soul (2001), Nashville: Thomas Nelson, ISBN 0-7852-8796-5
- Wild at Heart Field Manual: A Personal Guide to Discover the Secret of Your Masculine Soul (2002), Nashville: Thomas Nelson, ISBN 0-7852-6574-0
- The Journey of Desire: Searching for the Life We've Only Dreamed of (2001), Nashville: Thomas Nelson, ISBN 0-7852-6716-6
- The Journey of Desire: The Participant's Guide (2001), Nashville: Thomas Nelson, ISBN 0-7852-9877-0
- The Journey of Desire Journal & Guidebook: An Expedition to Discover the Deepest Longings of Your Heart (2002), Nashville: Thomas Nelson, ISBN 0-7852-6640-2 [with Craig McConnell]
- Waking the Dead: The Glory of a Heart Fully Alive (2003), Nashville: Thomas Nelson, ISBN 0-7852-8829-5
- A Guidebook to Waking the Dead: Embracing the Life God Has for You (2003), Nashville: Thomas Nelson, ISBN 0-7852-6309-8 [with Craig McConnell]
- Epic: The Story God Is Telling (2004), Nashville: Thomas Nelson, ISBN 0-7852-8879-1
- Epic Church Kit (2007), Nashville: Thomas Nelson, ISBN 1-4185-2614-2
- Captivating: Unveiling the Mystery of a Woman's Soul (2005), Nashville: Thomas Nelson, ISBN 0-7852-6469-8
- Captivating Study Guide: Unveiling The Mystery of a Woman's Soul (2007), Nashville: Thomas Nelson, ISBN [with Stasi Eldredge]
- The Ransomed Heart: A Collection of Devotional Readings (2005), Nashville: Thomas Nelson, ISBN 0-7852-0706-6
- The Way of the Wild Heart: A Map for the Masculine Journey (2006), Nashville: Thomas Nelson, ISBN 0-7852-0677-9
- Desire: The Journey We Must Take to Find the Life God Offers (2007), Nashville: Thomas Nelson, ISBN 0-7852-8842-2
- Walking with God: Talk to Him. Hear from Him. Really. (2008), Nashville: Thomas Nelson, ISBN 0-7852-0696-5
- A Personal Guide to Walking with God (2008), Nashville: Thomas Nelson ISBN 1-4185-2821-8
- Fathered by God (2009), Nashville: Thomas Nelson, ISBN 1-4002-8027-3 [re-publication of a portion of The Way of the Wild Heart]
- Love & War: Finding the Marriage you've Dreamed of (2009), with Stasi Eldredge
- Beautiful Outlaw: Experiencing the Playful, Disruptive, Extravagant Personality of Jesus (2011), New York: FaithWords, ISBN 978-0-89296-088-0
- The Utter Relief of Holiness (2013), New York: Faithwords – ISBN 978-1-4555-2571-3
- Killing Lions: A Guide Through the Trials Young Men Face. (2014), Nashville: Thomas Nelson, ISBN 1-4002-0670-7 [with Sam Eldredge]
- Moving Mountains: Praying with Passion, Confidence, and Authority (2016), Nashville: Thomas Nelson, ISBN 978-0718037512
- All Things New: Heaven, Earth, and the Restoration of Everything You Love (2017), Nashville: Thomas Nelson, ISBN 978-0718037994
- Get Your Life Back: Everyday Practices for a World Gone Mad (2020), Nashville: Thomas Nelson, ISBN 978-1400208661
- Resilient: Restoring Your Weary Soul In These Turbulent Times (2022), Nashville: Thomas Nelson (ISBN 978-1400208685)
