= All Around Me =

2007 single by Flyleaf

Single by Flyleaf

from the album Flyleaf
- Released: April 23, 2007
- Genre: Post-grunge
- Length: 3:18
- Label: Octone
- Songwriters: Sameer Bhattacharya; James Culpepper; Jared Hartmann; Pat Seals; Lacey Sturm
- Producer: Howard Benson

Flyleaf singles chronology
"Fully Alive" (2006)	"All Around Me" (2007)	"Sorrow" (2008)

Music video
- "All Around Me" on YouTube

"All Around Me" is a song by American band Flyleaf from their self-titled debut album, Flyleaf (2005). It was released as the third single on April 23, 2007. It is the band's highest-charting and only single to chart on the Billboard Hot 100 and their most successful single to date.

Eventually, it became a mainstream and modern rock hit in the United States, crossing over to the pop charts, where it reached No. 40 on the Billboard Hot 100. The song took a large leap into the top 40 channels, receiving more than 20 new stations in a single day. The song was certified 4× Platinum in the U.S. on September 9, 2025, selling over 4,000,000 copies.

== Background ==
Front woman Lacey Mosley has stated on the radio station LA Lloyd's Rock 30 that the song is about her spiritual relationship with God. She has stated "It's a song about meeting God. I remember looking at a bunch of people's Myspace when I first saw Myspace and the 'Who I'd Like to Meet' the number one thing people picked was God. I think about that. I don't know how many times I've experienced something where I felt like God showed up and saved me or loved me for no reason sometimes. That's why I sing this song, I sing it to God. It's really intimate as well, you can think about it as a relationship between two people in love, too. I never think about it that way, but what's so cool about that is I think there's parallels everywhere – in everything in life. I think that that parallel is something that God wants to communicate to us, that he gives us relationships like that, an intimacy like that".

== Music video ==
The music video for the song was directed by Paul Fedor. In it, the band is dressed in white except lead singer Lacey Mosley, who is wearing a grey dress. The walls have red, yellow, blue, green, and black paint running down them and later in the video the paint is on the band.

The video provides a different version of the song, which includes an extra refrain in the second chorus, totaling a duration of 3 minutes and 34 seconds as opposed to the album version at 3 minutes and 18 seconds.

The video debuted on Fuse TV's Oven Fresh on June 25, 2007, and on Yahoo Music on June 28, 2007.

== Track listing ==
Digital download EP
No.	Title	Length
1.	"All Around Me"	3:18
2.	"All Around Me" (acoustic version)	3:21
3.	"Do You Hear What I Hear"	2:57

== Charts ==
=== Weekly charts ===
Weekly chart performance for "All Around Me"
Chart (2007–2008)	Peak position
US Billboard Hot 100	40
US Adult Pop Airplay (Billboard)	23
US Alternative Airplay (Billboard)	6
US Mainstream Rock Airplay (Billboard)	20
US Pop Airplay (Billboard)	12
Venezuela Pop Rock (Record Report)	2

=== Year-end charts ===
Year-end chart performance for "All Around Me"
Chart (2007)	Position
US Alternative Songs (Billboard)	30

== Certifications ==
Certifications for "All Around Me"
Region	Certification	Certified units/sales
United States (RIAA)	4× Platinum	4,000,000^{‡}
^{‡} Sales+streaming figures based on certification alone.

== Awards ==
2009 BMI Pop Award Winning Song
