= Remember to Live =

Remember to Live EP

EP by Flyleaf
- Released: December 7, 2010
- Length: 23:51
- Label: A&M/Octone, Interscope
- Producer: Mark Troth Lewis, Ben Moody, Howard Benson

Flyleaf chronology
Memento Mori (2009)	Remember to Live EP (2010)	New Horizons (2012)

Professional ratings
Review scores
Source	Rating
AllMusic	3/5 stars
Jesus Freak Hideout	4.5/5 stars

Remember to Live is an EP by American rock band Flyleaf and released after the tour supporting their previously released album Memento Mori. The album consists of songs that fans have requested to be recorded for years, therefore the album was created especially for them. There are a few new songs the fans may have never heard and old ones reborn that fans will remember from when Flyleaf was first named "Passerby".

== Track listing ==
All tracks are written by Flyleaf.

CD version
No.	Title	Length
1.	"Justice & Mercy" (Violent Love Version)	2:39
2.	"Okay"	2:23
3.	"Amy Says"	3:37
4.	"Dear My Closest Friend"	2:29
5.	"Light in Your Eyes"	3:55
6.	"Believe in Dreams"	4:27
7.	"Arise" (Ben Moody Mix)	4:21
Total length:		23:51

== Track notes ==
- "Believe In Dreams" and "Amy Says" are re-worked demos that were originally written in the mid-2000s, before the release of Flyleaf's debut album.
- "Okay" was written in 2005 and often performed live before their song "Tina".
- "Justice and Mercy" is a track from Much Like Falling EP. The "Violent Love Version" is an acoustic version.
- "Dear My Closest Friend" is a song from Flyleaf's early days when they were called Passerby. It had never been released to the public.
- Ben Moody, a guitarist for the band We Are The Fallen and ex-guitarist/co-founder of Evanescence, remixed "Arise" for Flyleaf's EP. The original version of "Arise" can be found on the band's album Memento Mori.

== Chart performance ==
Chart (2010)	Peak position
US Billboard 200	111
US Billboard Alternative Albums	9
US Billboard Christian Albums	4
US Billboard Rock Albums	15

== Personnel ==
=== Band ===
- Lacey Mosley – lead vocals
- Sameer Bhattacharya – lead guitar
- Jared Hartmann – rhythm guitar
- James Culpepper – drums, percussion, timpani, and wind chimes
- Pat Seals – bass
