= New Horizons (Flyleaf album) =

Studio album by Flyleaf
- Released: October 30, 2012
- Studio: Bay 7 Studios, Valley Village; West Valley Studios, Woodland Hills, California
- Genre: Post-grunge, hard rock
- Length: 36:24
- Label: A&M Octone
- Producer: Howard Benson

Flyleaf chronology
Remember to Live (2010)	New Horizons (2012)	Who We Are (2013)

Singles from New Horizons
- 1. "New Horizons" Released: August 21, 2012; 2. "Call You Out" Released: September 25, 2012

Professional ratings
Aggregate scores
Source	Rating
Metacritic	(66/100)
Review scores
Source	Rating
AllMusic	3/5 stars
Alternative Press	3/5 stars
Alt Rock Live	7/10 stars
ARTISTdirect	5/5 stars
Bloody Disgusting	4/5 stars
Christian Music Zine	4.25/5
Jesus Freak Hideout	4.5/5 stars
Loudwire	4/5 stars
Plugged In (publication)	favorable
Revolver	3.5/5 stars

New Horizons is the third studio album by American rock band Flyleaf, released on A&M/Octone Records on October 30, 2012. It was produced by Howard Benson, who has produced several of Flyleaf's previous recordings. It was the final album with lead vocalist Lacey Sturm, who announced her departure from the band, just prior to the album's release, in October 2012. Sturm rejoined the band in 2022.

== Production ==
It was announced in February 2012 that Flyleaf had entered the studio with producer Howard Benson to start recording a new full-length studio album. A release date of October 30, 2012 was eventually confirmed for the album.

== Singles ==
"New Horizons" is the album's first single and was released in the iTunes Store on August 21. However, the song made its radio debut on Windsor, Ontario rock station 89X on August 1. According to bassist Pat Seals, the song is about "a feeling of looking toward the unknown future with hope." Seals also described it as one of the band's best songs to date. A video was made for the song, and it was subsequently released on September 4, 2012. A second single, "Call You Out", was released later that month. Of the song, Seals said "[it] was one of the first songs written during the New Horizons sessions. The stomping opening verse evolved over time into this aggressive but very calculated track that closes with Sameer using chaotic guitar sounds to sort of burn it to the ground - engages you all the way through."

== Track listing ==
All tracks are written by S. Bhattacharya, J. Culpepper, P. Seals, L. Sturm & J. Hartmann.

Standard Edition
No.	Title	Length
1.	"Fire Fire"	3:03
2.	"New Horizons"	3:09
3.	"Call You Out"	2:22
4.	"Cage on the Ground"	3:34
5.	"Great Love"	3:42
6.	"Bury Your Heart"	3:35
7.	"Freedom"	3:20
8.	"Saving Grace"	3:44
9.	"Stand"	3:40
10.	"Green Heart"	2:43
11.	"Broken Wings"	3:34
Total length:		36:24

iTunes bonus track
No.	Title	Length
12.	"Mama"	3:56
Total length:		40:20

== Chart performance ==
Chart (2012)	Peak position
US Billboard 200	16
US Billboard Alternative Albums	2
US Billboard Christian Albums	1
US Billboard Hard Rock Albums	2
US Billboard Rock Albums	4
US Billboard Digital Albums	10

== Personnel ==
New Horizons album personnel adapted from the CD liner notes

Flyleaf

- Lacey Sturm – lead vocals
- Sameer Bhattacharya – lead guitar, backing vocals
- Jared Hartmann – rhythm guitar
- Pat Seals – bass, backing vocals
- James Culpepper – drums

Production

- Howard Benson – production
- Mike Plotnikoff – recording
- Tom Lord-Alge – mixing at South Beach Studios, Miami Beach, Florida
- Femio Hernandez – mixing assistant
- Ted Jensen – mastering at Sterling Sound, New York City
- Hatsukazu "Hatch" Inagaki – additional engineering
- Paul DeCarli – digital editing, additional engineering
- Jimmy Fahey – assistant engineer

Additional personnel

- Howard Benson – keyboards, programming
- Paul DeCarli – additional programming
- Roi Hernandez – art direction
- Pat Seals – woodcut art
- Roi Hernandez – photography
- Alex Capaldi – photography
