= I'm So Sick =

2005 single by Flyleaf

Single by Flyleaf

from the album Flyleaf
- Released: November 21, 2005
- Recorded: May 2005
- Studio: Seattle, Washington
- Genre: Nu metal; emo
- Length: 2:56
- Label: Octone
- Songwriters: Sameer Bhattacharya; James Culpepper; Jared Hartmann; Lacey Sturm; Pat Seals
- Producer: Howard Benson

Flyleaf singles chronology
"Do You Hear What I Hear?" (2005)	"I'm So Sick" (2005)	"Fully Alive" (2006)

Music video
- "I'm So Sick" on YouTube

"I'm So Sick" is a song by American rock band Flyleaf. It was released in November 2005 as the first single off their debut album, Flyleaf (2005). It is their second song to have an accompanying music video and it has been shown on many mainstream television networks. On March 3, 2008, "I'm So Sick" was released in the UK and was played on Scuzz, Kerrang! and MTV2.

== Background ==
The song was partly inspired by a quote from Saint Augustine's autobiography Confessions: the widely cited phrase "The church is not a museum for saints, but a hospital for sinners" is frequently attributed to Augustine of Hippo.

== Song information ==
The introduction is played with a distorted bass guitar. Flyleaf vocalist Lacey Mosley once commented that she was surprised at how much her voice "downshifted" during the introductions.

The demo version or the first version of the song was featured on their EP, Flyleaf. The version is longer and has more lyrics. The radio edit does not feature any screaming.

The song was featured as a playable track in the 2007 video game Rock Band and also features on the Live Free or Die Hard soundtrack.

== Track listing ==
=== International single ===
CD
No.	Title	Length
1.	"I'm So Sick (Radio Edit)"	2:54
2.	"I'm So Sick (Live Version)"	3:23

=== Radio singles ===
Radio single No. 1
No.	Title	Length
1.	"I'm So Sick (Album Version)"	2:58
2.	"I'm So Sick (Radio Edit)"	2:58
3.	"Call Out Hook"	0:10

Radio single No. 2
No.	Title	Length
1.	"I'm So Sick (Top 40 Version)"	2:58
2.	"I'm So Sick (Album Version)"	2:58
3.	"Call Out Hook"	0:10

== Charts ==
Chart (2006)	Peak position
US Alternative Airplay (Billboard)	27
US Mainstream Rock (Billboard)	12

== Certifications ==
Region	Certification	Certified units/sales
United States (RIAA)	2× Platinum	2,000,000^{‡}
^{‡} Sales+streaming figures based on certification alone.
