= Much Like Falling (EP) =

EP by Flyleaf
- Released: October 30, 2007
- Genre: Alternative metal
- Length: 11:38
- Label: Octone

Flyleaf chronology
| Flyleaf (2005) | Much Like Falling (2007) | Memento Mori (2009) |

Alternative cover
- iTunes cover

Professional ratings
Review scores
| Source | Rating |
|---|---|
| Jesus Freak Hideout | 4/5 stars |

Much Like Falling is an EP by Flyleaf. This album was released digitally onto the iTunes Store on October 30, 2007. It includes unreleased songs not featured on their self-titled album. This EP was released onto the iTunes Store the same day as their re-release of their self-titled album, Flyleaf. The Much Like Falling EP was also released to select record stores for free in celebration of Record Store Day on April 19, 2008.

== Track listing ==
All tracks are written by Flyleaf.

CD Version
| No. | Title | Length |
|---|---|---|
| 1. | "Tina" | 2:33 |
| 2. | "Much Like Falling" | 2:05 |
| 3. | "Justice and Mercy" (Produced, mixed, and engineered by Cameron Webb) | 2:35 |
| 4. | "Supernatural (Acoustic)" (Produced, recorded, and mixed by Joe West) | 4:25 |

iTunes Version
| No. | Title | Length |
|---|---|---|
| 1. | "Much Like Falling" | 2:04 |
| 2. | "Supernatural (Acoustic)" (Produced, recorded, and mixed by Joe West) | 4:25 |
| 3. | "Tina" | 2:31 |
| 4. | "Justice and Mercy" (Produced, mixed, and engineered by Cameron Webb) | 2:33 |

== Personnel ==
Flyleaf

- Lacey Mosley – lead vocals
- Sameer Bhattacharya – lead guitar
- Jared Hartmann – rhythm guitar
- Pat Seals – bass guitar
- James Culpepper – drums, percussion

Production

- Produced and recorded by Mark Lewis and Flyleaf. (Except where noted.)
- Mixed by Joe West. (Except where noted.)
