= Fully Alive =

Single by Flyleaf

from the album Flyleaf
- Released: 2006
- Recorded: Seattle, Washington
- Genre: Hard rock; alternative metal
- Length: 2:34
- Label: Octone
- Songwriters: Sameer Bhattacharya; James Culpepper; Jared Hartmann; Pat Seals; Lacey Sturm
- Producer: Howard Benson

Flyleaf singles chronology
"I'm So Sick" (2005)	"Fully Alive" (2006)	"All Around Me" (2007)

Music video
- "Fully Alive" on YouTube

"Fully Alive" is a song by American rock band Flyleaf, released as the second single from their debut album Flyleaf (2005), in November 2006. It is the third song of the band to have a music video, which features the radio-edit version instead of the album version.

== Background ==
After the joint venture of A&M records and Octone Records, the debut album Flyleaf included the radio-edit version of "Fully Alive", replacing the original album version. For reasons unknown, the music video features the radio edit instead of the album version. The radio-edit version contains a variation of the guitar solo from the album version, along with additional lyrics.

It's about the singer for Trust Company, Kevin, his wife Layla. She's an awesome person, and you would never guess in a million years that she has the struggle that she has. Kinda changed my perspective about the way that I complain about things, the way that I wake up sad for no reason, and then she wakes up just glad to wake up.

— Lacey Mosley

== Track listing ==
CD
No.	Title	Length
1.	"Fully Alive (Radio edit)"	2:34
2.	"Call Out Hook"	0:10

== Charts ==
=== Weekly charts ===
Weekly chart performance for "Fully Alive"
Chart (2006–2007)	Peak position
US Alternative Airplay (Billboard)	31
US Mainstream Rock (Billboard)	13

=== Year-end charts ===
Year-end chart performance for "Fully Alive"
Chart (2006)	Position
US Mainstream Rock Songs (Billboard)	39

== Certifications ==
Certifications for "Fully Alive"
Region	Certification	Certified units/sales
United States (RIAA)	Platinum	1,000,000^{‡}
^{‡} Sales+streaming figures based on certification alone.
