= Wild at Heart (Eldredge book) =

2001 book by John Eldredge

- Author: John Eldredge and Brent Curtis
- Language: English
- Publisher: Thomas Nelson
- Publication date: 2001
- Publication place: United States
- Media type: Print
- Pages: 222 pp
- ISBN: 0-7852-6694-1
- OCLC: 50198630

Wild at Heart: Discovering the Secret of a Man's Soul is a book by John Eldredge published in 2001, on the subject of the role of masculinity in contemporary evangelical Christian culture and doctrine.

Eldredge claims that men are bored, fear risk, and fail to pay attention to their deepest desires. He challenges Christian men to return to what he characterizes as authentic masculinity. He argues that men often seek validation in venues such as work, or in the conquest of women, and he urges men to take time out and come to grips with the desires of their hearts. Eldredge frames the book around his outdoor experiences and anecdotes about his family and references elements of pop culture such as Braveheart, James Bond, Gladiator, and Indiana Jones, and lyrics from songs.

== Contents ==
=== Movement One: Reflecting God and the Masculine Question ===
Wild at Heart is split into three sections, called "movements." The first argues that every aspect of a man, from his desires to who he is as a man, reflects God. Eldredge argues that the reason a man has the desires that he does and the reason why he is masculine is because he is, ultimately, an image-bearer of God. Eldredge asserts that all man carry a deep question that is uniquely a masculine question: "Do I have what it takes?"

=== Movement Two: The Poser, the Wound, and the Healing ===
In the second movement, Eldredge asserts that all men carry a wound that hits men in the area of their deep question. He asserts that all men create a false self by which they display themselves to the world at large. This false self, or identity, feigns strength and courage while hiding cowardice and fear. Eldredge calls this false self The Poser.

Eldredge says that the answer to a man's question and the healing of their wound can only be found in Jesus. Eldredge describes the journey of healing and restoration that God wants to take every man on so that they can begin to live life the way he intended for them: freely, and from their regenerated masculine heart.

=== Movement Three: The Core Desires of a Man's Heart ===
The first desire is for a "battle to fight." Eldredge says that deep in the heart of every man is a warrior.

The second desire is for an "adventure to live." Eldredge points to the desire that most men have for exploration, creativity, and risk-taking as uniquely masculine and a reflection of the heart of God.

The third desire is for a "beauty to rescue." Eldredge does not advocate male superiority or attempt to teach that women want or need to be subjugated by men. He points to the damsel in distress trope in popular storytelling, where a beautiful woman needs rescuing in some fashion, whether it is from a dragon or a wicked stepmother or from fear and hopelessness.

== Reception ==
Chuck Swindoll, a radio evangelical pastor, called it "the best, most insightful book I have read in at least the last five years."

Eldredge's work has its detractors. Some have pointed out that the leader of the "pseudo-evangelical" cult and criminal organization La Familia cartel in Mexico, who refer to their assassinations and beheadings as '"divine justice", has made Eldredge’s book Wild at Heart required reading for La Familia gang members and has paid rural teachers and National Development Education members to circulate Eldredge's writings throughout the Michoacán countryside.

== Related works ==
In 2005 Eldredge with his wife Stasi wrote Captivating, a companion to Wild at Heart, which explores femininity.
