= Flyleaf (band) =

American rock band

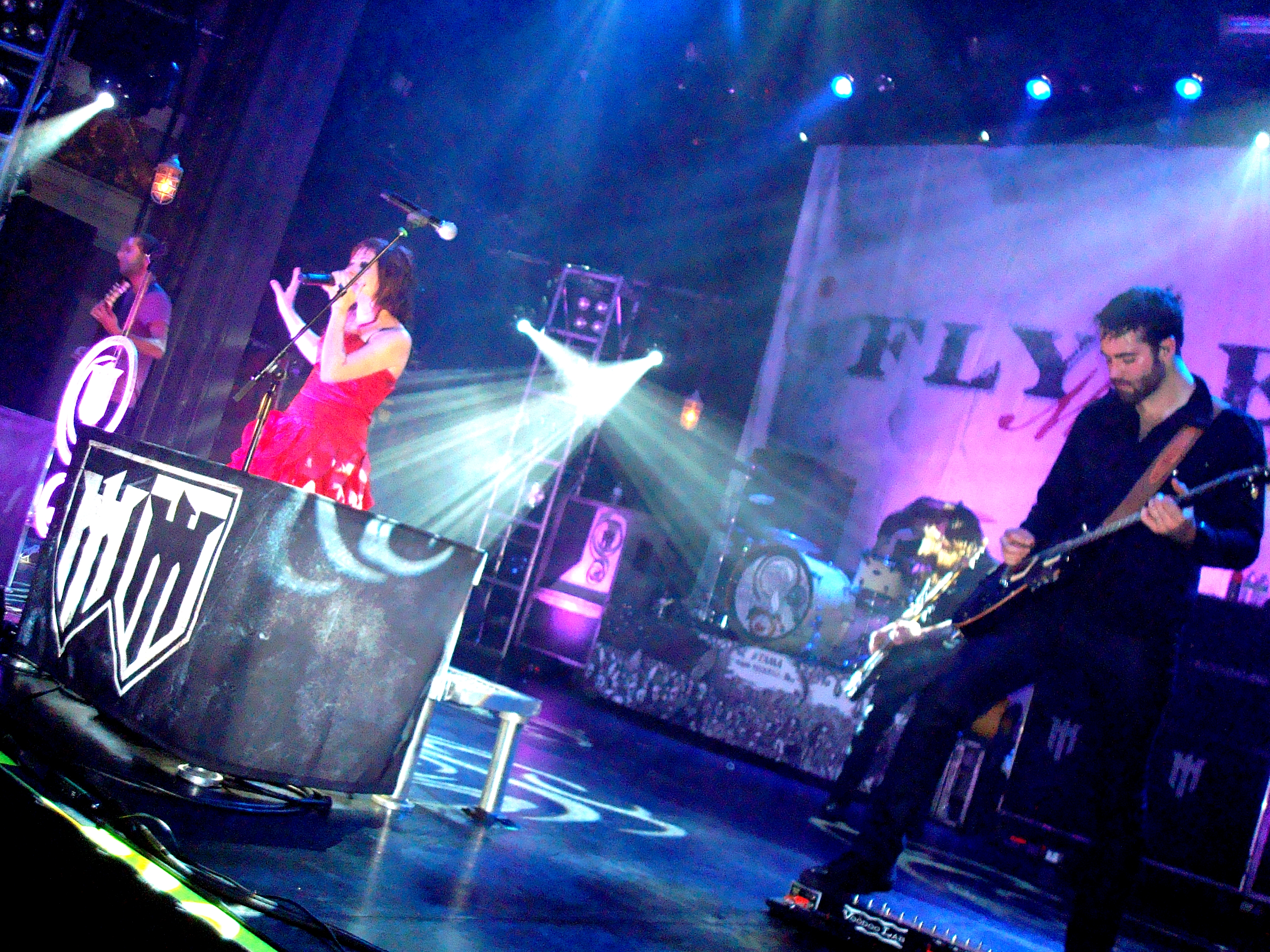
- Flyleaf in 2010

Background information
- Also known as: Passerby (2002–2004)
- Origin: Belton, Texas, U.S.
- Genres: Alternative rock; post-grunge; hard rock; alternative metal; Christian rock
- Years active: 2002–2016; 2022–present
- Labels: A&M/Octone; GUN; INO; Loud & Proud
- Members: Sameer Bhattacharya; James Culpepper; Jared Hartmann; Pat Seals; Lacey Sturm
- Past members: Kristen May
- Website: flyleafmusic.com

Flyleaf is an American rock band formed in Belton, Texas, in 2002. The band has charted on mainstream rock, Christian pop, and Christian rock charts. They performed around the US in 2003 before releasing their eponymous debut album, Flyleaf, in 2005. The album went platinum after selling more than one million copies. Flyleaf released their second album, Memento Mori, in 2009, which debuted and peaked at No. 8 on the Billboard charts.

Shortly before the release of their third album, New Horizons (2012), lead vocalist Lacey Sturm announced her departure. Kristen May subsequently became the new lead vocalist. May sang with the band until August 2016. After several years of inactivity, the band announced in November 2022 that Sturm had rejoined.

== History ==
=== Early years (2002–2004) ===
Early on, Lacey Sturm performed with James Culpepper. Guitarists Jared Hartmann and Sameer Bhattacharya were later recruited. "Sameer and Jared are really experimental with melodies and pedals," said Sturm, "and we all had different influences that were all blending together with the same passionate and hopeful heart, and that brought out this beautiful feeling. It was magical." Bassist Pat Seals joined after leaving his previous band, The Grove.

As Passerby, the band released three EPs and played over 100 shows in Texas alone over the span of two years under the booking and promotion company Runt Entertainment. In 2004, Passerby played a showcase for RCA Records in New York City in hopes of getting signed. RCA passed on the band, but the president of Octone Records was very interested. They waited for two days in their van at a truck stop for a phone call about an Octone showcase. They were signed after the showcase, and on January 7, 2004, Octone Records' website announced their arrival to the label.

In March 2004, Passerby traveled to Seattle, Washington, to record an EP with producer Rick Parashar. Afterwards, they toured with Skillet, Breaking Benjamin, Staind, and 3 Doors Down to promote their self-titled EP. For legal reasons, they renamed themselves Flyleaf in June 2004. In October, the EP was released to stores (as Flyleaf), spawning their first official single and video for the EP version of "Breathe Today".

=== Debut album (2005–2008) ===
In 2005, the band recorded their first full-length album with Howard Benson. On October 4, 2005, the record was released under the title Flyleaf. Appearances on the album include Dave Navarro of Jane's Addiction and Ryan White of Resident Hero. The first mainstream single from their debut album was "I'm So Sick", "Fully Alive" was the second, "All Around Me" was the third, and "Sorrow" was the fourth.

In the summer of 2006, the band played on the mainstage of the Family Values Tour 2006, and in late 2006, Flyleaf toured with Disturbed, Stone Sour and Nonpoint on the Music as a Weapon III Tour. The band issued an exclusive EP, which was sold at the tour called Music as a Weapon EP which features an acoustic version of "Fully Alive", and three previously unreleased tracks: "Much Like Falling", "Justice And Mercy", and "Christmas Song" (Much Like Falling and Justice and Mercy later appeared on Much Like Falling EP). A portion of the proceeds from the sale of the EP went to World Vision.

In 2007 Flyleaf toured with Three Days Grace and throughout Australia with the Soundwave festival, and also toured Europe with Stone Sour and Forever Never. In the spring of 2007, Flyleaf headlined their Justice & Mercy Tour which first featured Skillet and Dropping Daylight. Later on they did a second leg of the tour which featured Sick Puppies, Kill Hannah and Resident Hero. Flyleaf again joined the Family Values Tour in 2007. The music video for "I'm So Sick" appeared briefly in the 2007 film Live Free or Die Hard. Also a remix of the song "I'm So Sick" is on the Soundtrack to the movie Resident Evil: Extinction. "Perfect" was also released as a single in late 2007 to Christian radio stations. Released on November 5, 2007, The Sims 2 expansion pack Teen Style Stuff featured the band's song "Cassie" recorded in Simlish.

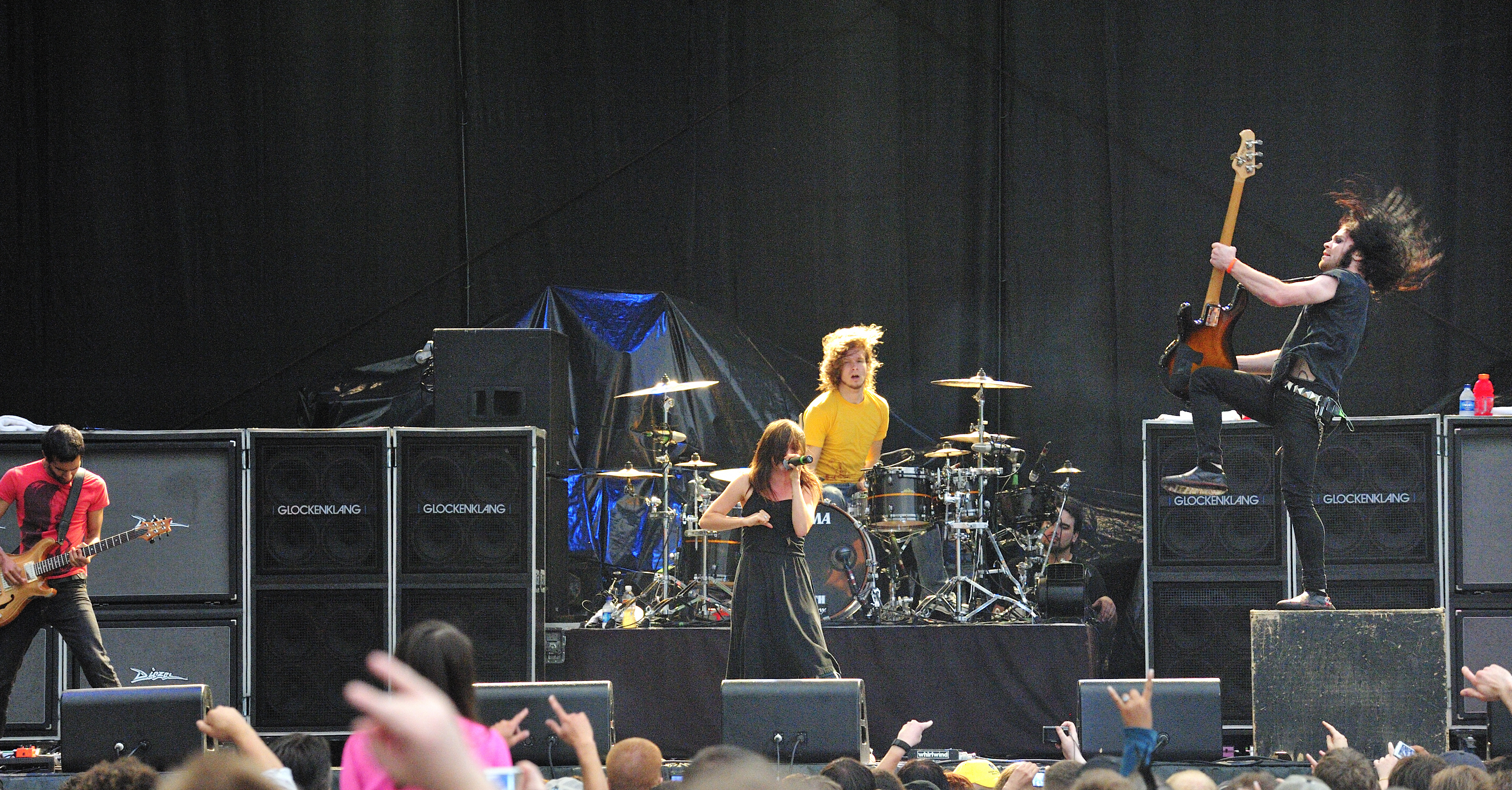
Flyleaf at Beale Street Music Festival on May 2, 2008

Flyleaf also released a song entitled "Tina" which was the first song that they debuted in the release of Guitar Hero 3 as part of the Companion Disk Set. Also, the song "I'm So Sick" appears in Rock Band. On October 30, Flyleaf also released a digital EP titled Much Like Falling EP. The songs included on this EP were "Much Like Falling", an acoustic version of "Supernatural", the limited release song "Tina", and The EP is available on iTunes along with the expanded edition of their debut album.

On April 26, 2008, the band released their fourth video, "Sorrow", from their debut album on MTV2. The band toured with Seether in late spring but had to cancel five shows due to a problem with Sturm's voice. The members of Flyleaf took the fall off to write new music, hoping to begin recording by January.

Flyleaf also contributed a cover of the song "What's This?" from The Nightmare Before Christmas soundtrack for the album Nightmare Revisited.

The band also toured heavily in 2008 in both North America and Europe.

=== Memento Mori (2009–2010) ===
When Flyleaf finished recording their second album, they had selected 14 songs out of the 30 already written. Some of these songs, such as "Again", "Have We Lost", and "Beautiful Bride", have been performed live. The band reunited with producer Howard Benson and enlisted the mixing services of Chris Lord-Alge It was released on November 10, 2009. The album, titled Memento Mori, features songs such as "Beautiful Bride", "Arise", "Missing", "Again" and "Set Apart This Dream", which was inspired by the Christian book Wild at Heart. Flyleaf debuted an additional two songs live during a small acoustic tour the band did in Afghanistan for United States Armed Forces called "Chasm" and "Circle". As they published on their MySpace page, Flyleaf's first single "Again" was released on iTunes and also played on the radio. Meiert Avis directed the single's music video.

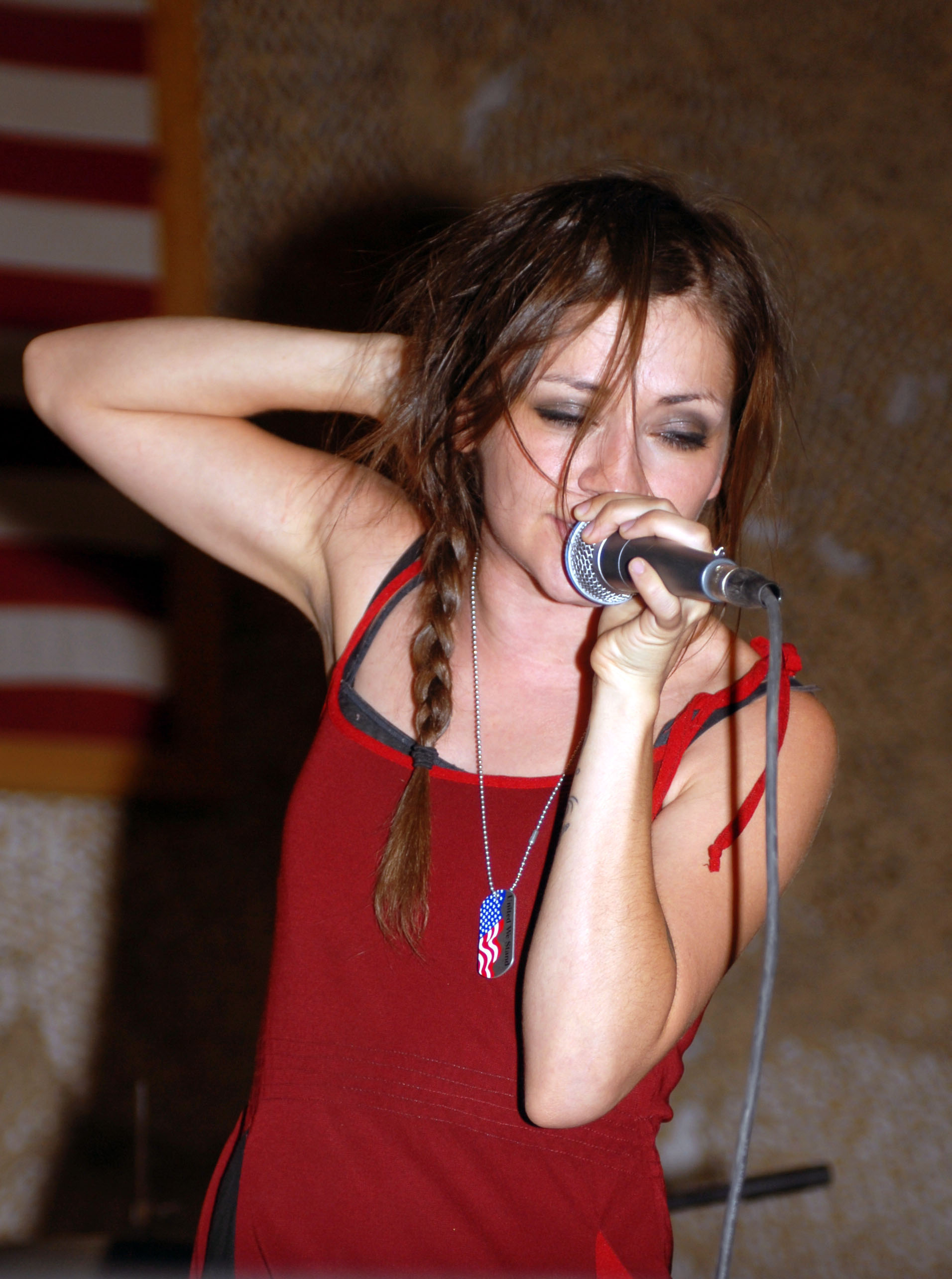
Sturm performing in Bagram Air Field, Afghanistan in 2009

The group, starting in Seattle, Washington, on September 28, 2009, held VIP listening parties throughout the country inviting fans to be the first to hear a selection of songs from the new record and view brand new music videos before they aired nationwide. By partnering with Eventful, fans were given the opportunity to demand that their city get routed into the "Road to Memento Mori" using Eventful's "Demand It!" service.

Based on overwhelming demand there were over 10 events. Fans saw Sturm, Sameer Bhattacharya, and Jared Hartmann, who made special appearances at these intimate gatherings across the country.

On November 2, 2009, the band released a short Webisode for their new album.

Flyleaf's other video, "Beautiful Bride", was shot in early August 2009 by director Don Tyler. The video was originally released at the Memento Mori listening events, but was later featured on Yahoo! the day Memento Mori came out. The video features James' sister/Sameer's wife, April, as the bride and Joshua, Sturm's husband, as the groom. Like "Again," this video features Pat's artwork throughout the video. Future singles are set to include "Chasm" for rock stations and "Missing" for alternative.

Flyleaf toured throughout the United States with Breaking Benjamin and Three Days Grace from January to March 2010. They embarked on a headlining tour called the "Unite & Fight Tour" with 10 Years and Fair to Midland. The tour began on April 28, 2010, and ended on June 6, 2010. The band attended the Muz-TV Award 2010 awards (Премия МУЗ-ТВ) in Russia and performed the songs "I'm So Sick", "Again" and "All Around Me". They are one of many bands that performed at Download Festival on June 12, 2010. The band encouraged fans to donate to stop human trafficking in other countries.

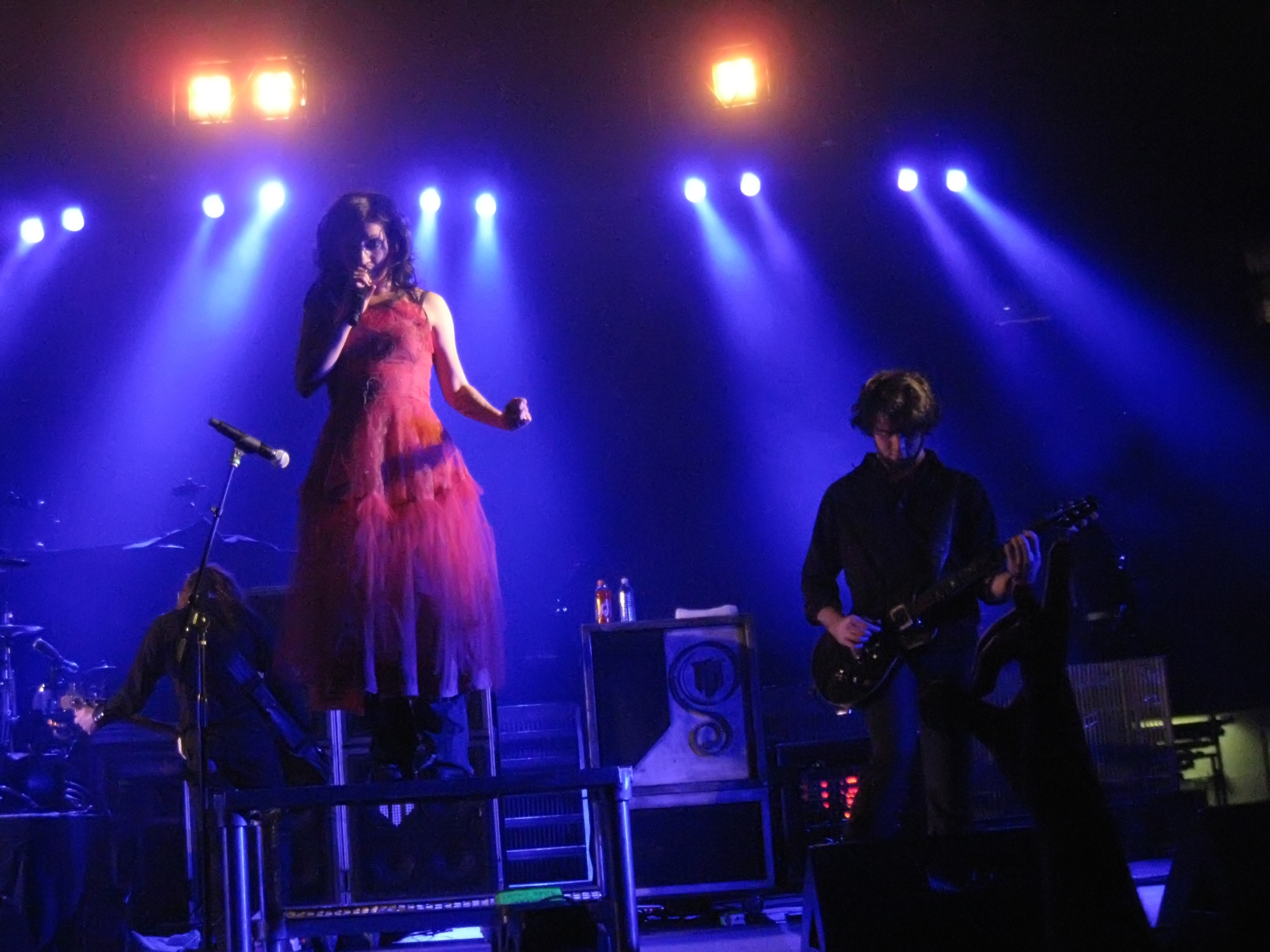
Flyleaf performing in 2010

The band was scheduled to continue with the second leg of the "Unite & Fight" tour from September 10, 2010, to October 23, 2010, with Story of the Year, and performed at various festivals through the end of the year. They also released an animated music video for "Chasm" on September 22, which was directed/animated/illustrated by Giles Timms. At the end of the Unite and Fight tour in early November, Sturm collaborated with band Apocalyptica on the song "Broken Pieces", as well as with Australian singer Orianthi in her new song "Courage". Soon after they released "Arise" as the next single from Memento Mori.

On November 6, 2010, the band performed at Rock the Hood, a festival at Fort Hood in memory of all the soldiers who have died, especially the 13 who died at the November 2009 shooting.

On November 15, 2010, Sturm shared via Facebook that she and her husband, Joshua, were expecting a baby boy in early 2011.

On December 7, 2010, Flyleaf released an EP titled Remember to Live, then released a cover of the John Mark McMillan song "How He Loves" on December 21, 2010.

=== New Horizons and departure of Sturm (2011–2013) ===
On January 22, 2011, Hartmann announced that he and Culpepper were building a recording studio and preparing to record demos for their next album. In February 2011, the band started pre-production for their next album at Treelady Studios in Pittsburgh, PA.

On June 1, 2012, the band confirmed via Twitter that the album and first single would be called New Horizons. The single premiered on Windsor, Ontario's 89X Radio on August 1, 2012, and released through iTunes on August 21, 2012.

On September 4, 2012, Sturm's birthday, Flyleaf released the official video for "New Horizons" on Fuse. The video included a picture in the background as a tribute to Rich Caldwell and footage of Lacey and Joshua Sturm's son, Joshua "Jack" Sturm.

Flyleaf also released an additional single, entitled "Call You Out", on September 25, 2012. The album was released on October 30, 2012.

On October 22, 2012, the band announced that Lacey Sturm was stepping down as the band's lead vocalist. In a statement written by Pat Seals, Kristen May, formerly of Vedera, was announced as Sturm's replacement. Sturm expressed that with the birth of her son, Jack, and the death of one of the band's lead audio engineers, Rich Caldwell, that she knew the true meaning of "Memento Mori" (the title of their second full-length album).

Guitarist Sameer Bhattacharya stated in an interview that they would write new music with their new lead vocalist Kristen May.

Flyleaf released a new single on June 18, 2013, with May on vocals, "Something Better" featuring P.O.D. front man Sonny Sandoval. A new EP, Who We Are, was released on July 9, 2013. Later that year, the band was featured in an NME article titled "28 Nu-Metal Era Bands You Probably Forgot All About".

=== Between the Stars (2014–2016) ===
Flyleaf announced that a new album was in the works for a 2014 release and released a teaser video on PledgeMusic.com. The new album was fully funded on February 2, 2014. On March 29, they confirmed Don Gilmore as the producer for their upcoming album.

On May 20, 2014, Flyleaf announced that they were now signed to Loud & Proud Records and would be releasing their album in early fall. The first single will be released in July and tour dates will be announced after that.

"Set Me on Fire", the lead single from the upcoming album, Between the Stars, premiered on July 1 through Revolver. The album was released on September 16, 2014. They then went on tour in support of the album.

The band released the album cover via a puzzle game starting on July 21, 2014. and the track list the following day.

In 2015 the group headlined the “Hottest Chicks In Hard Rock' Tour alongside The Agonist and Fit For Rivals. Also headlining the “SnoCore Tour” alongside Adelita's Way.

Between the Stars is also the band's first release from their new home, label Loud & Proud Records.

=== May's departure and hiatus (2016–2022) ===
On August 15, 2016, lead vocalist Kristen May announced her departure from the band, citing a growing desire to stay at home with her family and that she never really felt as if she was part of the band.

Following May's departure, the band went on hiatus. The remaining members went on to pursue other interests. Jared, along with his wife, Kat formed a musical duo called Kat&Jared in 2017. Bhattacharya would tour with P.O.D. as their keyboardist from 2016 until 2018. He and Seals, along with P.O.D. drummer Wuv Bernardo formed a musical project called Belle and the Dragon, they released their debut album, Birthrights, in 2020. Seals joined Crobot in 2023.

=== Sturm's return (2022–present) ===
In 2021, the band's social media accounts were reactivated after being inactive since the band's hiatus. In November 2022, the band began teasing their return, including releasing band photos with their original lead singer, Lacey Sturm. On November 7, 2022, the band's profile pictures on their social media accounts changed to feature the phrase Flyleaf with Lacey Sturm. On April 27, 2023, the band played a reunion show in Belton, Texas, marking their first live performance in 7 years, and the first with Sturm in nearly 11 years. On December 6, 2024, the band began offering pre-orders for the first vinyl pressing of their self-titled album, to be released in 2025, 20 years after the album's original release. The group have performed at several festivals in 2025 with Sturm as the vocalist.

On February 24, 2026, the band announced the Flyleaf with Lacey Sturm 20th Anniversary Tour. The tour ran from July 8 to July 30, 2026, across 14 cities. The band also made an appearance at Welcome to Rockville, which took place in Daytona Beach, Florida, in May 2026.

== Musical style ==
Flyleaf has been categorized under various genres of rock music, including alternative metal, hard rock, alternative rock, post-grunge, nu metal, post-hardcore, and "emo-metal". Because of the many religious references in Flyleaf's music, they are also considered to be a Christian rock band. Despite the numerous genres they have been labeled as, May considered the band to be simply alternative rock, saying, "I think the reason we get put in different genres is because there are so many different influences in the songwriting."

== Christianity ==
Lead vocalist Lacey Sturm is a Christian. While faith has influenced the band's music, Sturm said that she does not believe that necessarily makes Flyleaf strictly a Christian band. The band says they are Christians who play in a rock band, and their faith is heard within their music.

In November 2006, Flyleaf performed a free concert at Los Angeles Pierce College for a Christian group called The Revolt, which was a three-day event. The band performed a half-hour set Thursday night. It was The Revolt's opening night at Pierce College and the first time the campus had been used as an outdoor music venue.

In a May 2010 interview, Sturm was asked how it felt to be in a Christian rock band and play in Las Vegas:

Well, you know what? I don't know what you mean by a "Christian rock band." It's hard to say that because people all have a different definition of what that means. If it means that we're Christians, then yeah, we're Christians, but if a plumber's a Christian, does that make him a "Christian plumber?" I mean we're not playing for Christians. We're just playing honestly and that's going to come out.

Shortly after joining the band, former lead vocalist May stated that she felt that some of the band's fans believed she was "not Christian enough" compared to Sturm, despite professing to be a Christian.

Although the band explores themes transcending many faiths and ways of life, they insist being a Christian will always be a part of them and influence their writing.

== Band members ==
Current

- James Culpepper – drums, percussion (2002–2016; 2022–present)
- Sameer Bhattacharya – lead guitar (2002–2016; 2022–present); backing vocals (2012–2016; 2022–present); keyboards, piano (2014–2016; 2022–present)
- Jared Hartmann – rhythm guitar (2002–2016; 2022–present)
- Pat Seals – bass (2002–2016; 2022–present); backing vocals (2012–2016; 2022–present)
- Lacey Sturm – lead vocals (2002–2012, 2022–present)

Former

- Kristen May – lead vocals (2012–2016)

Timeline

== Discography ==
- Flyleaf (2005)
- Memento Mori (2009)
- New Horizons (2012)
- Between the Stars (2014)

== Awards ==
Award	Year	Nominee(s) / Work(s)	Category	Result	Ref.
AMTV Dewmocracy Challenge	2010	"Missing"	Favorite Music Video	Won	
BMI Film & TV Awards	2009	"All Around Me"	Pop Award	Won	
Dove Awards	2011	Memento Mori	Rock Album of the Year	Nominated	
Dove Awards	2013	New Horizons	Rock Album of the Year	Nominated	
Revolver Golden Gods Awards	2010	Lacey Sturm	Hottest Chick in Metal	Nominated	
