= Flyleaf (album) =

Studio album by Flyleaf
- Released: October 4, 2005
- Recorded: 2005
- Genres: Post-grunge; alternative metal; Christian rock
- Length: 33:42
- Labels: Octone; Polydor
- Producer: Howard Benson

Flyleaf chronology
Flyleaf (2004)	Flyleaf (2005)	Much Like Falling (2007)

Singles from Flyleaf
- 1. "I’m So Sick" Released: November 21, 2005; 2. "Fully Alive" Released: November 2006; 3. "All Around Me" Released: April 23, 2007; 4. "Sorrow" Released: April 26, 2008

Professional ratings
Review scores
Source	Rating
About.com	3.5/5 stars
AllMusic	4.5/5 stars
Jesus Freak Hideout	4.5/5 stars
Kludge	5/10

Flyleaf is the debut studio album by American rock band Flyleaf. It was released on October 4, 2005, through Octone Records. A re-packaged CD/DVD special edition was released on October 30, 2007, which included additional acoustic tracks and music videos. The album was re-released on January 14, 2008, through Polydor Records in the United Kingdom, which included three additional acoustic tracks. In December 2024, the band began accepting pre-orders for the first vinyl pressing of Flyleaf with release planned for January 2025 according to the band's Instagram page. The pressing was simultaneously teased by band members Lacey Sturm, James Culpepper and Sameer Bhattacharya on their own Instagram accounts.

Lyrically, the album deals with topics such as Christianity, love and death. Flyleaf received mixed reviews from music critics. It debuted at No. 88 on the Billboard 200, selling more than 13,000 copies within its first week. Due to the band's growing exposure to fame in 2007, it eventually reached its peak of No. 57 on the week of September 17, 2007, and spent more than 133 weeks on the chart. It also topped the Billboard Christian Albums chart, and has since become the ninth best-selling Christian album of the 2000s. It has sold more than 1 million copies to date, and was certified Platinum by the Recording Industry Association of America (RIAA).

== Background ==
The album was released October 4, 2005. On October 30, 2007, the band re-released the album repackaged as a CD/DVD special edition version. It has the same tracks as the original release, with the addition of acoustic versions of "Cassie", "Fully Alive", "I'm So Sick", "All Around Me", and "Red Sam" (which is the only acoustic song not released as a single). The DVD has exclusive interviews with Flyleaf and music videos of "All Around Me", "I'm So Sick", and "Fully Alive". The re-release also came packaged with a free ringtone of "All Around Me" and a "locker" poster. The album was re-released January 14, 2008, in the UK on Polydor Records but with only three additional acoustic tracks.

When A&M Records teamed with Octone Records, the album was re-printed to show the new joint-venture label arrangement. This re-printed version had "Fully Alive" at a length of 2:34, replacing the original 2:48 version, and a different back cover artwork.

The single "Cassie" was written in honor of Cassie Bernall, who was killed in the Columbine High School massacre in 1999.

== Commercial performance ==
Flyleaf sold over 13,000 copies of the special edition CD/DVD in the first week. They jumped 59 spots on the Billboard Top 200 chart up to No. 62. In the second week of sales for the special edition CD/DVD, Flyleaf sold over 10,100 copies. To date, it has sold over 1 million copies in the U.S., certifying it as platinum.

According to Billboard, the album was the ninth best-selling Christian album between the years 2000 and 2009.

== Track listing ==
All tracks are written by Lacey Mosley, James Culpepper, Sameer Bhattacharya, Jared Hartmann, Pat Seals, co-writes noted.

Standard edition
No.	Title	Writer(s)	Length
1.	"I'm So Sick"		3:00
2.	"Fully Alive"		2:47
3.	"Perfect"	Mark Lewis	2:53
4.	"Cassie"		2:58
5.	"Sorrow"		2:45
6.	"I'm Sorry"		2:43
7.	"All Around Me"		3:18
8.	"Red Sam"	Will Hoffman	3:20
9.	"There for You"		2:47
10.	"Breathe Today"	Hoffman	2:29
11.	"So I Thought"	Hoffman	4:50

German and Japanese bonus track
No.	Title	Length
12.	"Tina"	2:34

International re-release bonus tracks
No.	Title	Length
12.	"Fully Alive" (acoustic)	2:16
13.	"All Around Me" (acoustic)	3:21
14.	"Cassie" (acoustic; Europe-only)	3:08

US special edition bonus tracks
No.	Title	Writer(s)	Length
12.	"Fully Alive" (acoustic)		2:15
13.	"Red Sam" (acoustic)	Hoffman	3:26
14.	"Cassie" (acoustic)		3:10
15.	"I'm So Sick" (acoustic)		2:59
16.	"All Around Me" (acoustic)		3:21

US special edition bonus DVD
No.	Title	Writer(s)	Length
1.	"Fully Alive" (acoustic)
2.	"Red Sam" (acoustic)	Hoffman
3.	"Cassie" (acoustic)
4.	"I'm So Sick" (acoustic)
5.	"All Around Me" (acoustic)
6.	"All Around Me" (music video)
7.	"Fully Alive" (music video)
8.	"I'm So Sick" (music video)

Deluxe edition
No.	Title	Writer(s)	Length
12.	"Tina"		2:33
13.	"Justice and Mercy"		2:33
14.	"Much Like Falling"		2:04
15.	"I'm So Sick" (acoustic)		2:59
16.	"Fully Alive" (acoustic)		2:14
17.	"Cassie" (acoustic)		3:08
18.	"All Around Me" (acoustic)		3:20
19.	"Red Sam" (acoustic)	Hoffman	3:24
20.	"I'm So Sick" (Rhapsody Original)		3:01
21.	"Fully Alive" (Rhapsody Original)		2:32
22.	"Cassie" (Rhapsody Original)		2:58
23.	"Sorrow" (Rhapsody Original)		2:47

== Personnel ==
Flyleaf

- Lacey Mosley – vocals
- Pat Seals – bass guitar
- Sameer Bhattacharya – guitar
- Jared Hartmann – guitar
- James Culpepper – drums

Production/additional credits

- Dave Navarro – additional guitar on "There for You"
- Ryan White of Resident Hero – background vocals on "Cassie", "So I Thought", and "Red Sam"
- Howard Benson – producer, keyboards and programming
- Mike Plotnikoff – mixing and recording
- Leon Zervos & Chris Athens – mastering at Sterling Sound, New York
- Mark Lewis – production and mixing on acoustic versions of "Fully Alive", "Red Sam", "Cassie", and "All Around Me"
- Joe West – production and mixing on acoustic version of "I'm So Sick"
- Fred Kevorkian – mastering of acoustic versions
- James Diener & Ben Berkman – A&R
- Hatsukazu Inagaki, Alex Uychocde – assistant engineering
- Paul Decarli – Pro Tools editing
- Jon at Drum Fetish – drum technician
- Ed DeGenaro – sound technician
- Keith Nelson – guitar technician
- 7S – art direction
- Sam Erickson, Stephen Albanese – photography
- Cole Rise – cover photography
- Shannon Ronique Neall – angel illustration

== Charts ==
=== Weekly charts ===
Chart (2005–2008)	Peak position
US Billboard 200	57
US Top Alternative Albums (Billboard)	11
US Top Christian Albums (Billboard)	1
US Top Hard Rock Albums (Billboard)	12
US Top Rock Albums (Billboard)	12

=== Year-end charts ===
Chart (2006)	Position
US Billboard 200	160
US Christian Albums (Billboard)	6
Chart (2007)	Position
US Billboard 200	140
US Christian Albums (Billboard)	3
Chart (2008)	Position
US Billboard 200	105
US Christian Albums (Billboard)	2
Chart (2025)	Position
US Top Christian Albums (Billboard)	22

== Certifications ==
Region	Certification	Certified units/sales
United States (RIAA)	Platinum	1,000,000^{^}
^{^} Shipments figures based on certification alone.

== Accolades ==
Award (2009)
2009 BMI Pop Award Winning Song – All Around Me
