= Argument from morality =

Argument for the existence of God

The argument from morality is an argument for the existence of God. Arguments from morality tend to be based on moral normativity or moral order. Arguments from moral normativity observe some aspect of morality and argue that God is the best or only explanation for this, concluding that God must exist. Arguments from moral order are based on the asserted need for moral order to exist in the universe. They claim that, for this moral order to exist, God must exist to support it. The argument from morality is noteworthy in that one cannot evaluate the soundness of the argument without attending to almost every important philosophical issue in meta-ethics.

German philosopher Immanuel Kant devised an argument from morality based on practical reason. Kant argued that the goal of humanity is to achieve perfect happiness and virtue (the summum bonum) and believed that an afterlife must be assumed to exist in order for this to be possible, and that God must be assumed to exist to provide this. Rather than aiming to prove the existence of God, however, Kant was simply attempting to demonstrate that all moral thought requires the assumption that God exists, and therefore that we are entitled to make such an assumption only as a regulative principle rather than a constitutive principle (meaning that such a principle can guide our actions, but it does not provide knowledge). In his book Mere Christianity, C. S. Lewis argued that "conscience reveals to us a moral law whose source cannot be found in the natural world, thus pointing to a supernatural Lawgiver." Lewis argued that accepting the validity of human reason as a given must include accepting the validity of practical reason, which could not be valid without reference to a higher cosmic moral order which could not exist without a God to create and/or establish it. A related argument is from conscience; John Henry Newman argued that the conscience supports the claim that objective moral truths exist because it drives people to act morally even when it is not in their own interest. Newman argued that, because the conscience suggests the existence of objective moral truths, God must exist to give authority to these truths.

Contemporary defenders of the argument from morality are Graham Ward, Alister McGrath and William Lane Craig.

== General form ==
All variations of the argument from morality begin with an observation about moral thought or experiences and conclude with the existence of God. Some of these arguments propose moral facts which they claim evident through human experience, arguing that God is the best explanation for these. Other versions describe some end which humans should strive to attain that is only possible if God exists.

Many arguments from morality are based on moral normativity, which suggests that objective moral truths exist and require God's existence to give them authority. Often, they consider that morality seems to be binding – obligations are seen to convey more than just a preference, but imply that the obligation will stand, regardless of other factors or interests. For morality to be binding, God must exist. In its most general form, the argument from moral normativity is:

1. A human experience of morality is observed.
2. God is the best or only explanation for this moral experience.
3. Therefore, God exists.

Some arguments from moral order suggest that morality is based on rationality and that this can only be the case if there is a moral order in the universe. The arguments propose that only the existence of God as orthodoxly conceived could support the existence of moral order in the universe, so God must exist. Alternative arguments from moral order have proposed that we have an obligation to attain the perfect good of both happiness and moral virtue. They attest that whatever we are obliged to do must be possible, and achieving the perfect good of both happiness and moral virtue is only possible if a natural moral order exists. A natural moral order requires the existence of God as orthodoxly conceived, so God must exist.

== Variations ==
=== Practical reason ===
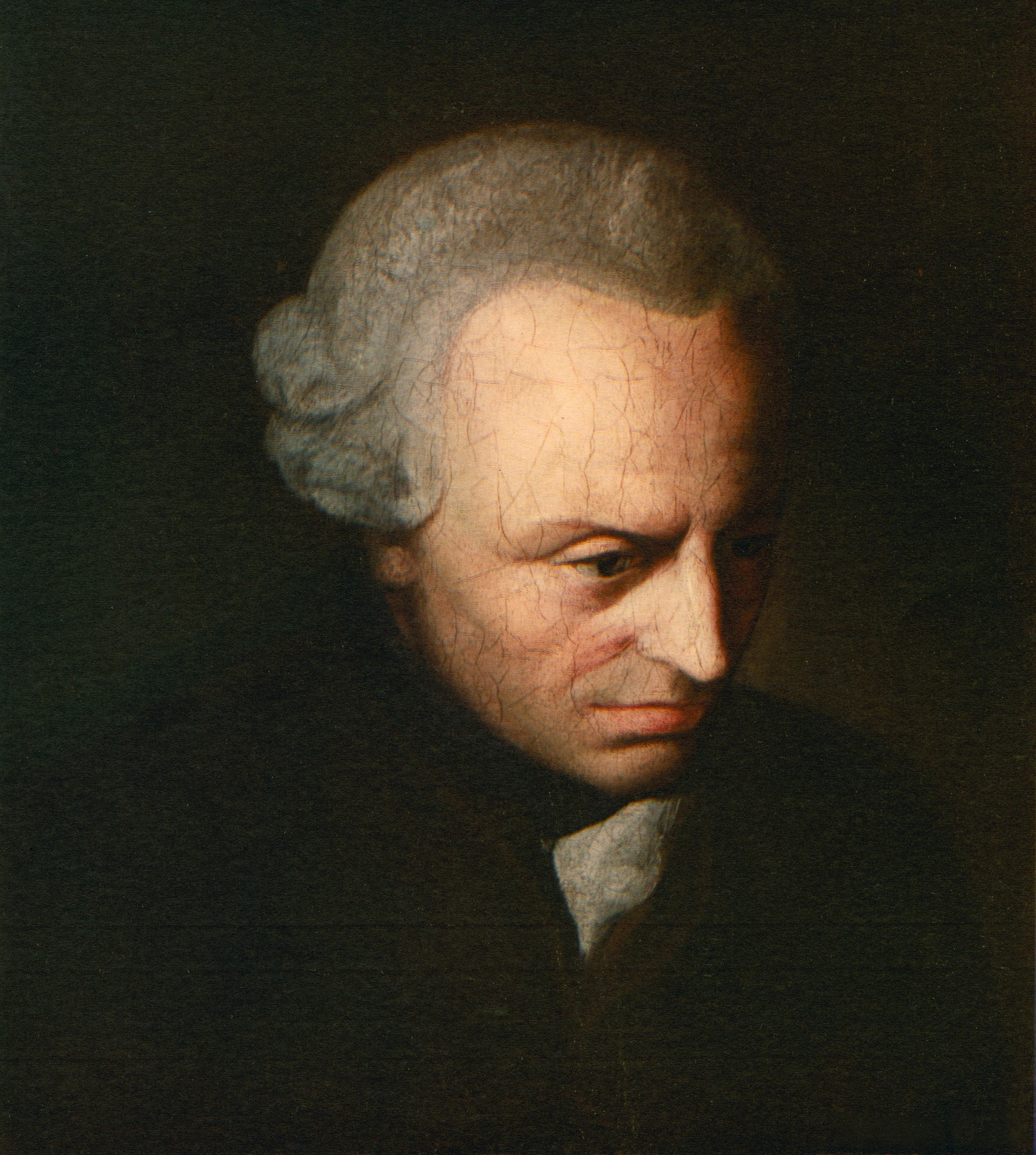
Portrait of Immanuel Kant, who proposed an argument for the existence of God from morality

In his Critique of Pure Reason, German philosopher Immanuel Kant stated that no successful argument for God's existence arises from reason alone. In his Critique of Practical Reason he went on to argue that, despite the failure of these arguments, morality requires that God's existence is assumed, owing to practical reason. Rather than proving the existence of God, Kant was attempting to demonstrate that all moral thought requires the assumption that God exists. Kant argued that humans are obliged to bring about the summum bonum: the two central aims of moral virtue and happiness, where happiness arises out of virtue. As ought implies can, Kant argued, it must be possible for the summum bonum to be achieved. He accepted that it is not within the power of humans to bring the summum bonum about, because we cannot ensure that virtue always leads to happiness, so there must be a higher power who has the power to create an afterlife where virtue can be rewarded by happiness.

Philosopher G. H. R. Parkinson notes a common objection to Kant's argument: that what ought to be done does not necessarily entail that it is possible. He also argues that alternative conceptions of morality exist which do not rely on the assumptions that Kant makes – he cites utilitarianism as an example which does not require the summum bonum. Nicholas Everitt argues that much moral guidance is unattainable, such as the Biblical command to be Christ-like. He proposes that Kant's first two premises only entail that we must try to achieve the perfect good, not that it is actually attainable.

=== Argument from objective moral truths ===
Both theists and non-theists have accepted that the existence of objective moral truths might entail the existence of God. Atheist philosopher J. L. Mackie accepted that, if objective moral truths existed, they would warrant a supernatural explanation. Scottish philosopher W. R. Sorley presented the following argument:

1. If morality is objective and absolute, God must exist.
2. Morality is objective and absolute.
3. Therefore, God must exist.

Many critics have challenged the second premise of this argument, by offering a biological and sociological account of the development of human morality which suggests that it is neither objective nor absolute. This account, supported by biologist E. O. Wilson and philosopher Michael Ruse, proposes that the human experience of morality is a by-product of natural selection, a theory philosopher Mark D. Linville calls evolutionary naturalism. According to the theory, the human experience of moral obligations was the result of evolutionary pressures, which attached a sense of morality to human psychology because it was useful for moral development; this entails that moral values do not exist independently of the human mind. Morality might be better understood as an evolutionary imperative in order to propagate genes and ultimately reproduce. No human society today advocates immorality, such as theft or murder, because it would undoubtedly lead to the end of that particular society and any chance for future survival of offspring. Scottish empiricist David Hume made a similar argument, that belief in objective moral truths is unwarranted and to discuss them is meaningless.

Because evolutionary naturalism proposes an empirical account of morality, it does not require morality to exist objectively; Linville considers the view that this will lead to moral scepticism or antirealism. C. S. Lewis argued that, if evolutionary naturalism is accepted, human morality cannot be described as absolute and objective because moral statements cannot be right or wrong. Despite this, Lewis argued, those who accept evolutionary naturalism still act as if objective moral truths exist, leading Lewis to reject naturalism as incoherent. As an alternative ethical theory, Lewis offered a form of divine command theory which equated God with goodness and treated goodness as an essential part of reality, thus asserting God's existence.

J. C. A. Gaskin challenges the first premise of the argument from moral objectivity, arguing that it must be shown why absolute and objective morality entails that morality is commanded by God, rather than simply a human invention. It could be the consent of humanity that gives it moral force, for example. American philosopher Michael Martin argues that it is not necessarily true that objective moral truths must entail the existence of God, suggesting that there could be alternative explanations: he argues that naturalism may be an acceptable explanation and, even if a supernatural explanation is necessary, it does not have to be God (polytheism is a viable alternative). Martin also argues that a non-objective account of ethics might be acceptable and challenges the view that a subjective account of morality would lead to moral anarchy.

William Lane Craig has argued for this form of the moral argument.

=== Argument for conscience ===
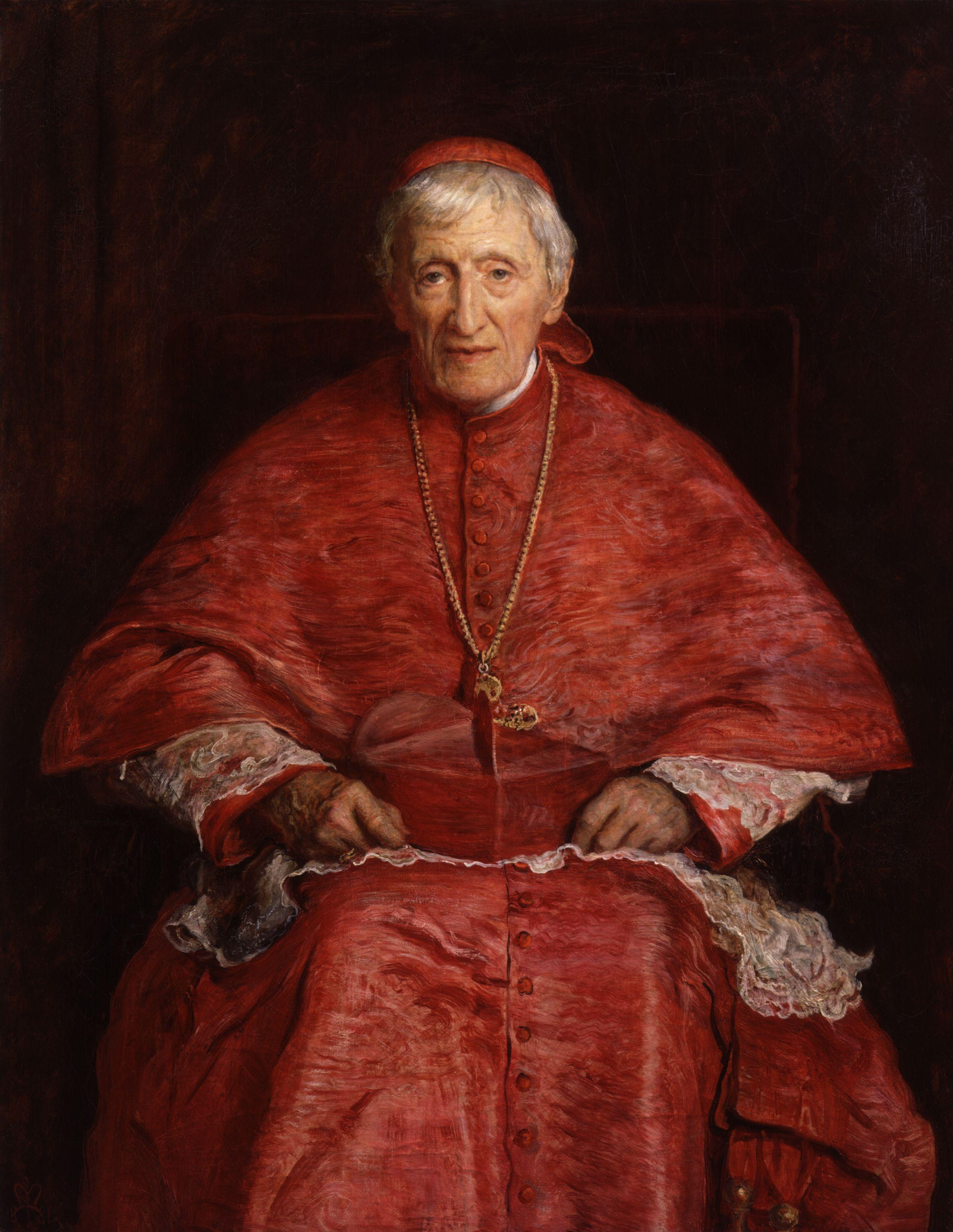
Portrait of John Henry Newman, who used the conscience as evidence of the existence of God

Related to the argument from morality is the argument from conscience, associated with eighteenth-century bishop Joseph Butler and nineteenth-century cardinal John Henry Newman. Newman proposed that the conscience, as well as giving moral guidance, provides evidence of objective moral truths which must be supported by the divine. He argued that emotivism is an inadequate explanation of the human experience of morality because people avoid acting immorally, even when it might be in their interests. Newman proposed that, to explain the conscience, God must exist.

British philosopher John Locke argued that moral rules cannot be established from conscience because the differences in people's consciences would lead to contradictions. Locke also noted that the conscience is influenced by "education, company, and customs of the country", a criticism mounted by J. L. Mackie, who argued that the conscience should be seen as an "introjection" of other people into an agent's mind. Michael Martin challenges the argument from conscience with a naturalistic account of conscience, arguing that naturalism provides an adequate explanation for the conscience without the need for God's existence. He uses the example of the internalization by humans of social pressures, which leads to the fear of going against these norms. Even if a supernatural cause is required, he argues, it could be something other than God; this would mean that the phenomenon of the conscience is no more supportive of monotheism than polytheism.

C. S. Lewis argues for the existence of God in a similar way in his book Mere Christianity, but he does not directly refer to it as the argument from morality.

== Bibliography ==
- Adams, Robert (1987). The Virtue of Faith and Other Essays in Philosophical Theology. Oxford University Press. ISBN 9780195041460.
- Boniolo, Giovanni; De Anna, Gabriele (2006). Evolutionary Ethics and Contemporary Biology. Cambridge University Press. ISBN 9780521856294.
- Boyd, Richard (1988). Sayre-McCord, Geoffery (ed.). Essays on Moral Realism. Cornell University Press. Moral Arguments for Theistic Belief. ISBN 9780801495410.
- Craig, William Lane; Moreland, J.P. (2011). The Blackwell Companion to Natural Theology. John Wiley & Sons. ISBN 9781444350852.
- Everitt, Nicholas (2003). Non-Existence of God. Routledge. ISBN 9780415301060.
- Guyer, Paul (2006). Kant. Taylor & Francis. ISBN 9780415283359.
- Hare, John (1996). The Moral Gap: Kantian Ethics, Human Limits, and God's Assistance. Oxford University Press.
- Kant, Immanuel. Critique of Practical Reason. Part I, Bk. II, Chap. V.
- Mackie, J.L. (1982). The Miracle of Theism. Oxford University Press. Chap. VI.
- Martin, Michael (1992). Atheism: A Philosophical Justification. Temple University Press. ISBN 9780877229438.
- McSwain, Robert; Ward, Michael (2010). The Cambridge Companion to C.S. Lewis. Cambridge University Press. ISBN 9780521884136.
- Oppy, Graham (2006). Arguing About Gods. Cambridge University Press. ISBN 9780521863865.
- Parkinson, G. H. R. (1988). An Encyclopedia of Philosophy. Taylor & Francis. ISBN 9780415003230.
- Swinburne, Richard (1979). The Existence of God. Oxford University Press. ISBN 978-0-19-824611-4.
