= List of atheist philosophers =

There have been many philosophers in recorded history who were atheists. This is a list of atheist philosophers who have articles in Wikipedia. Living persons in this list are people deemed relevant for their notable activities in public life, and who have publicly identified themselves as atheists.

- Ibn al-Rawandi (827–911): Persian philosopher, who argued that dogma is antithetical to reason, miracles are fake, prophets are just magicians, and that the Paradise described by the Qur'an is not actually desirable.
- Abū al-ʿAlāʾ al-Maʿarrī (973–1057): Arab philosopher, poet, and writer who was known for attacking religious dogmas, advocating social justice and living an ascetic, vegan lifestyle.
- Zakī al-Arsūzī (1899–1968): Syrian philosopher, philologist, sociologist, historian, Arab nationalist, and one of the major founders of Ba'athism.
- John Anderson (1893–1962): Scottish-born Australian philosopher, founder of the empirical philosophy known as 'Sydney realism'.
- Louise Antony (1953–): American philosopher of mind and professor at the University of Massachusetts Amherst, who specializes in philosophy of mind, epistemology, feminist theory, and philosophy of language.

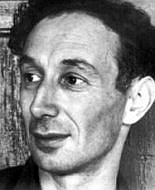
A. J. Ayer

- A. J. Ayer (1910–1989): British philosopher and advocate of logical positivism. Though he viewed the concept of God existing as meaningless, he described himself as an atheist.
- Julian Baggini (1968–): British writer specialising in the philosophy of personal identity, author of Atheism: A Very Short Introduction.
- Alain Badiou (1937–): French philosopher.
- Mikhail Bakunin (1814–1876): Russian philosopher, writer and anarchist.
- Roland Barthes (1915–1980): French literary theorist, philosopher, linguist, critic and semiotician.

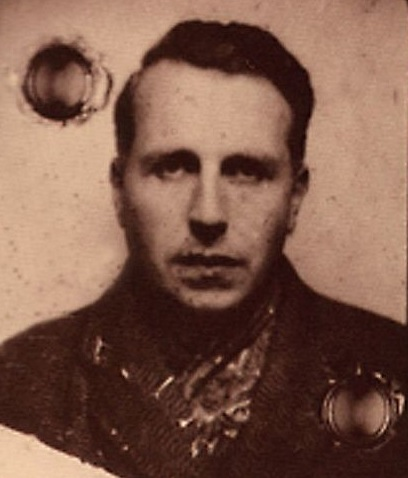
Georges Bataille

- Georges Bataille (1897–1962): French intellectual and literary figure. He was the author of Story of the Eye, and his writings explored areas relating to philosophy, mysticism, and eroticism.
- Bruno Bauer (1809–1882): German philosopher, theologian and historian, the first propounder of the Jesus myth hypothesis.
- Jean Baudrillard (1929–2007): French sociologist, philosopher, cultural theorist, political commentator and photographer.
- Simone de Beauvoir (1908–1986): French author and existentialist philosopher. Beauvoir wrote novels and monographs on philosophy, politics, social issues and feminism.
- David Benatar (1966–): South African philosopher, academic and author. He is best known for his advocacy of antinatalism in his book Better Never to Have Been: The Harm of Coming into Existence, in which he argues that coming into existence is a serious harm, regardless of the feelings of the existing being once brought into existence, and that, as a consequence, it is always morally wrong to create more sentient beings.

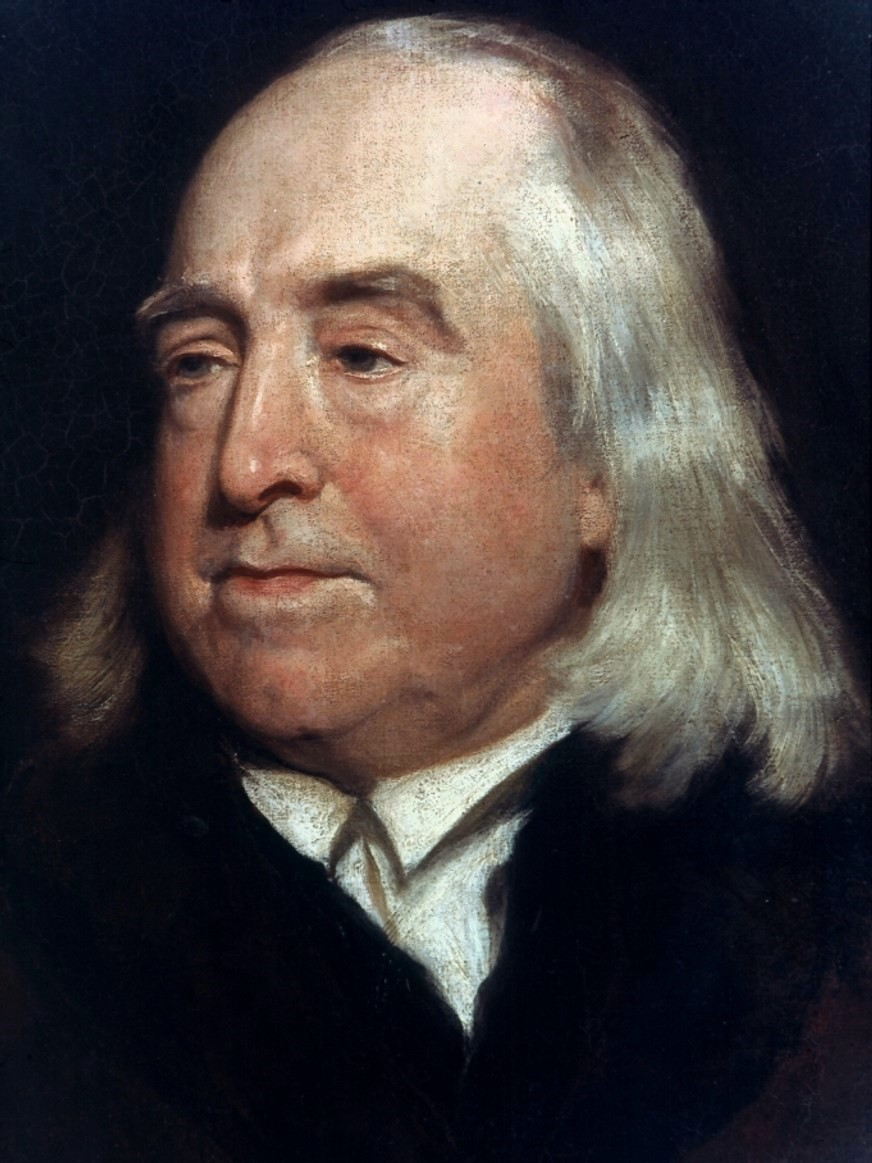
Jeremy Bentham

- Jeremy Bentham (1748–1832): English author, jurist, philosopher, and legal and social reformer. He is best known for his advocacy of utilitarianism.
- Simon Blackburn (1944–): English moral philosopher known for his efforts to popularise philosophy.
- Peter Boghossian (1966–): American philosopher and speaker for the Center for Inquiry, the Richard Dawkins Foundation for Reason and Science, and the Secular Student Alliance.
- Maarten Boudry (1984–): Flemish philosopher and skeptic, who has been active as a researcher and teaching member of the Department of Philosophy and Moral Sciences at Ghent University since 2006.
- Célestin Bouglé (1870–1940): French philosopher known for his role as one of Émile Durkheim's collaborators and a member of L'Année Sociologique.
- Ludwig Büchner (1824–1899): German philosopher, physiologist and physician who became one of the exponents of 19th-century scientific materialism.
- Gustavo Bueno (1924–2016): Spanish philosopher who was a modern proponent of philosophical materialism.
- Mario Bunge (1919–2020): Argentine-Canadian philosopher and physicist. His philosophical writings combined scientific realism, systemism, materialism, emergentism, and other principles.
- Albert Camus (1913–1960): Algerian-born French absurdist philosopher and author. His non-fiction philosophical works include The Myth of Sisyphus and The Rebel.
- Rudolf Carnap (1891–1970): German philosopher who was active in central Europe before 1935 and in the United States thereafter. He was a leading member of the Vienna Circle and a prominent advocate of logical positivism.
- Robert Todd Carroll (1945–2016): American writer and academic, professor of philosophy at Sacramento City College until 1997, and keeper of the Skeptic's Dictionary website.
- David Chalmers (1966–): Australian philosopher of mind.
- Émile Chartier (1868–1951): French philosopher, essayist and pacifist.
- Debiprasad Chattopadhyaya (1918–1993): Bengali Marxist philosopher.
- Nikolay Chernyshevsky (1828–1889): Russian revolutionary democrat, materialist philosopher, critic, and socialist.

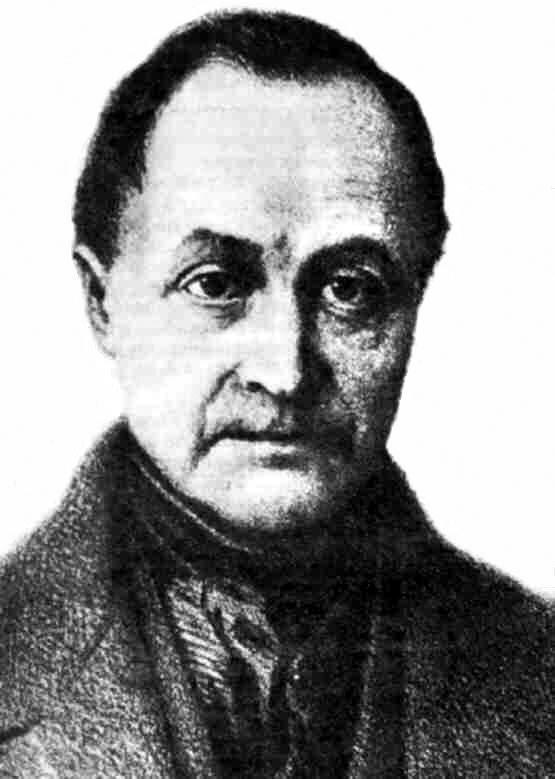
Auguste Comte

- Auguste Comte (1798–1857): French positivist thinker, credited with coining the term "sociologie" ("sociology").
- Marquis de Condorcet (1743–1794): French philosopher, mathematician, and early political scientist who devised the concept of a Condorcet method.
- Benedetto Croce (1866–1952): Italian philosopher and public figure.
- Donald Davidson (1917–2003): American philosopher.
- Gilles Deleuze (1925–1995): French philosopher who, from the early 1960s until his death, wrote many works on philosophy, literature, film, and fine art.
- Alain de Botton (1969–): British philosopher and author of Religion for Atheists: A Non-Believer's Guide to the Uses of Religion, 2012.

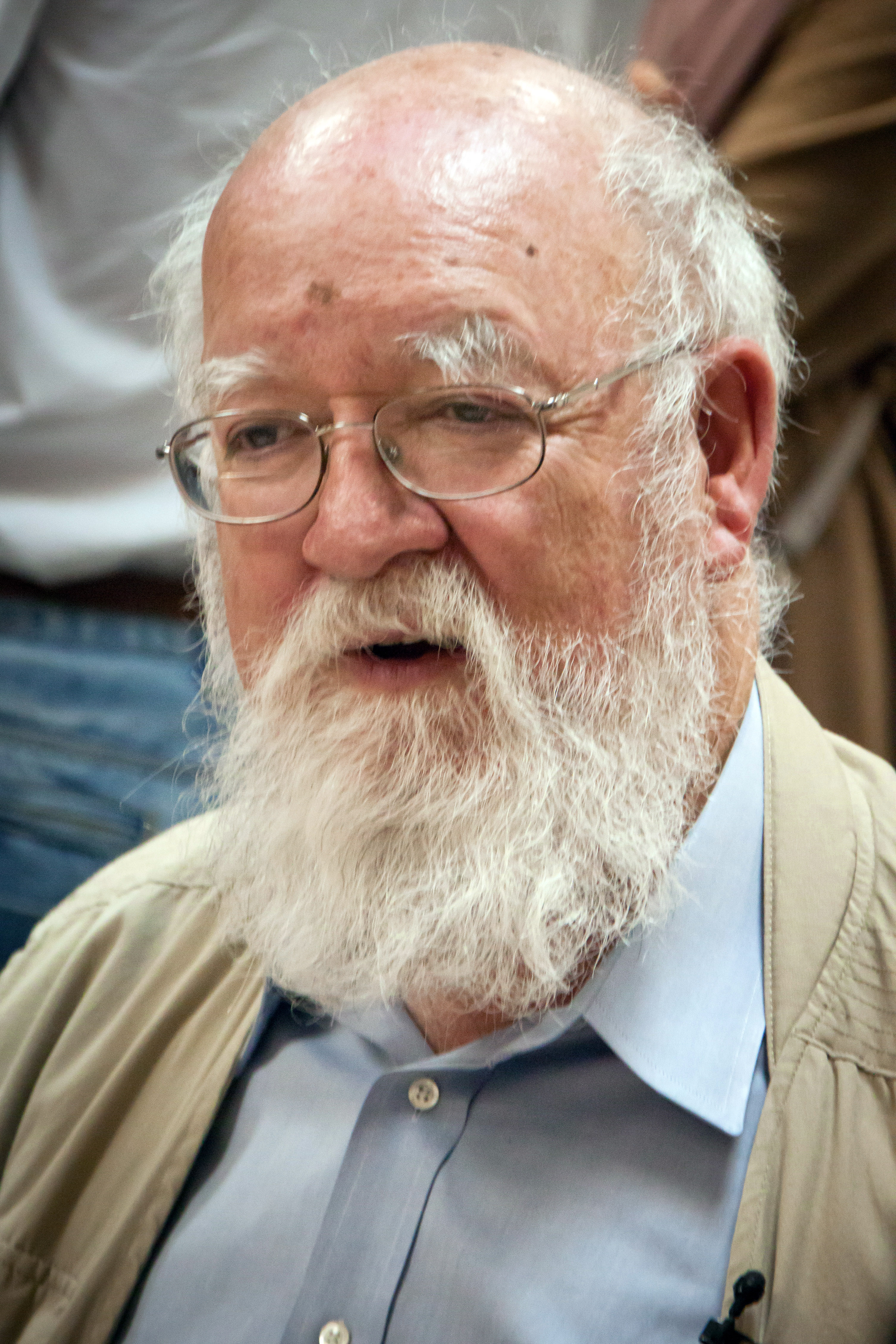
Daniel Dennett

- Daniel Dennett (1942–2024): American philosopher of science and author of Breaking the Spell.
- Jacques Derrida (1930–2004): Algerian-born French philosopher.
- Henry Louis Vivian Derozio (1809–1831): Anglo-Indian poet and teacher.

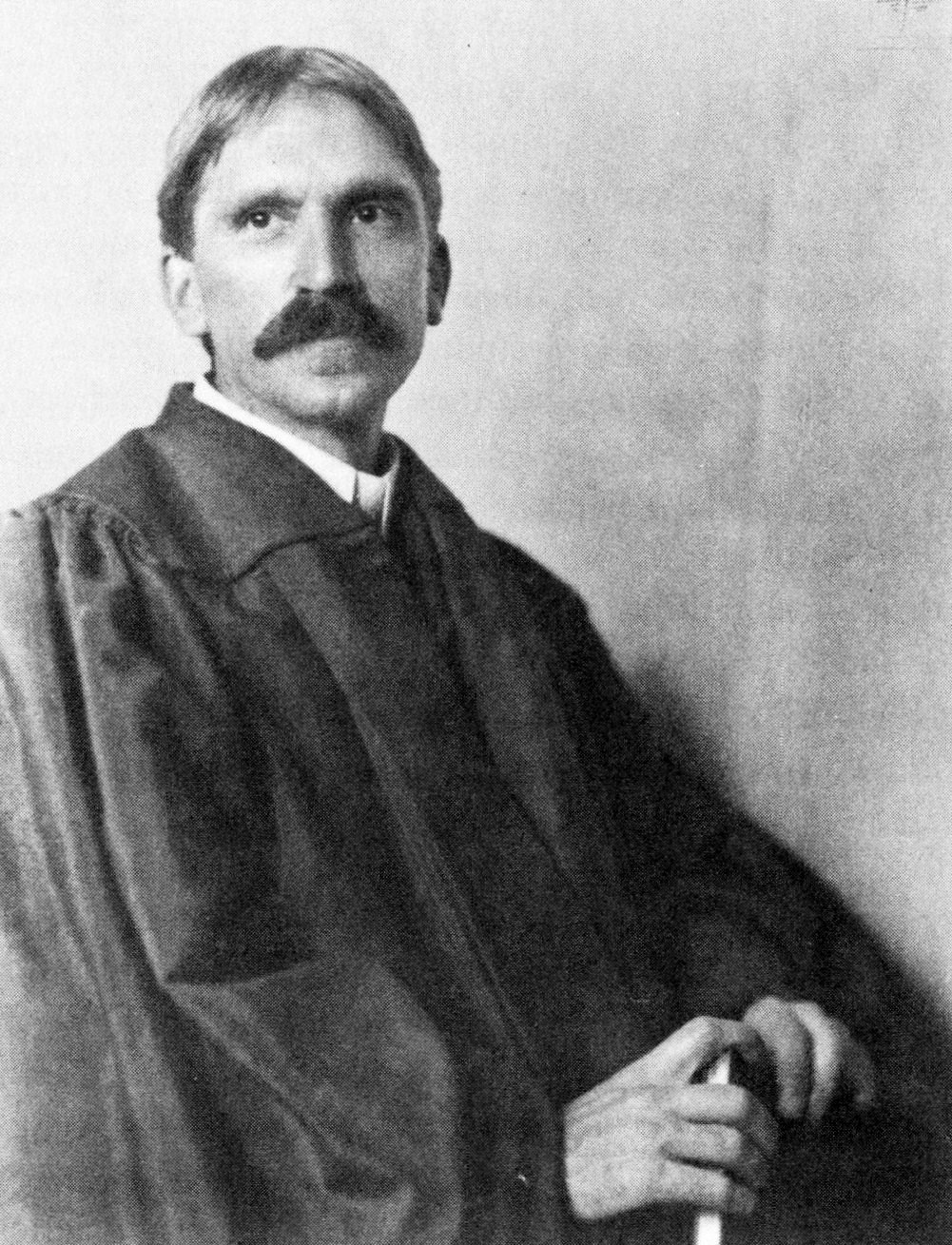
John Dewey

- John Dewey (1859–1952): American philosopher, psychologist and educational reformer whose ideas have been influential in education and social reform. Dewey was an important early developer of the philosophy of pragmatism and one of the founders of functional psychology. He was a major representative of progressive education and liberalism.
- Dharmakirti (6th or 7th century): One of the main contributors to logic in classical India, he developed a refutation of God's existence like many of his fellow Buddhist thinkers.
- Diagoras of Melos (5th century BC): Ancient Greek poet and sophist known as the Atheist of Milos, who declared that there were no gods.
- Denis Diderot (1713–1784): French editor-in-chief of the Encyclopédie.
- Theodore Drange (1934–): American philosopher of religion and Professor Emeritus at West Virginia University. Drange authored Nonbelief & Evil: Two arguments for the nonexistence of God.
- Paul Draper (1957–): American philosopher, most known for his work on the philosophy of religion.
- Umberto Eco (1932–2016): Italian novelist, literary critic, and philosopher that wrote on semiotics. He was also the author of Foucault's Pendulum and The Name of the Rose.
- Paul Edwards (1923–2004): Austrian-American moral philosopher and editor of The Encyclopedia of Philosophy.

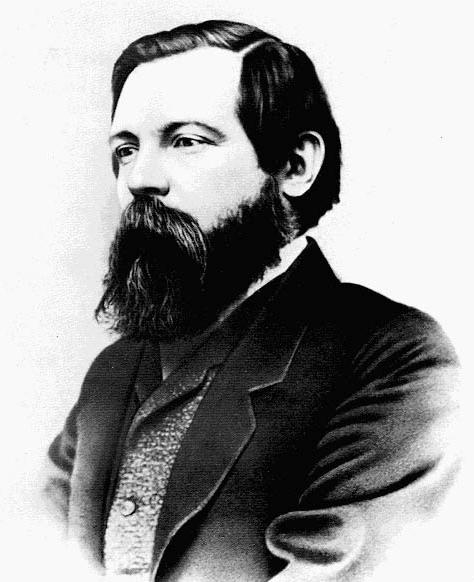
Friedrich Engels

- Friedrich Engels (1820–1895): Karl Marx's collaborator in developing the theory of communism. Engels' atheistic beliefs strained his relations with his parents.
- Nicholas Everitt (1943–): English philosopher and atheist writer who specializes in epistemology and philosophy of religion.

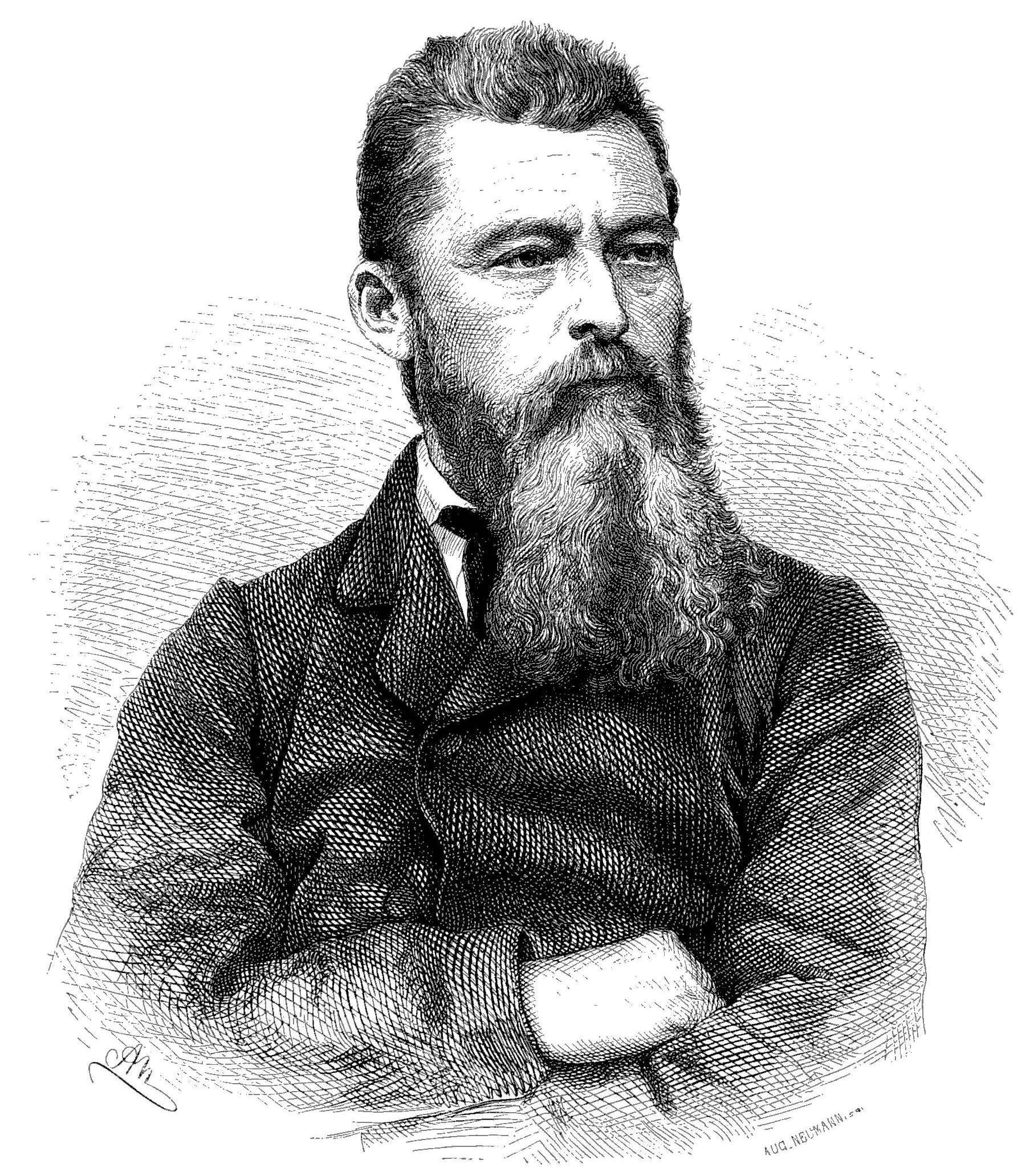
Ludwig Feuerbach

- Ludwig Andreas Feuerbach (1804–1872): German philosopher whose major work, The Essence of Christianity, maintains that religion and divinity are projections of human nature.
- Friedrich Karl Forberg (1770–1848): German philosopher and classical scholar.
- Michel Foucault (1926–1984): French philosopher and political activist known for his analysis of power and discourse. He is best known for his revolutionary philosophical analyses of social institutions such as Discipline and Punish and The History of Sexuality.

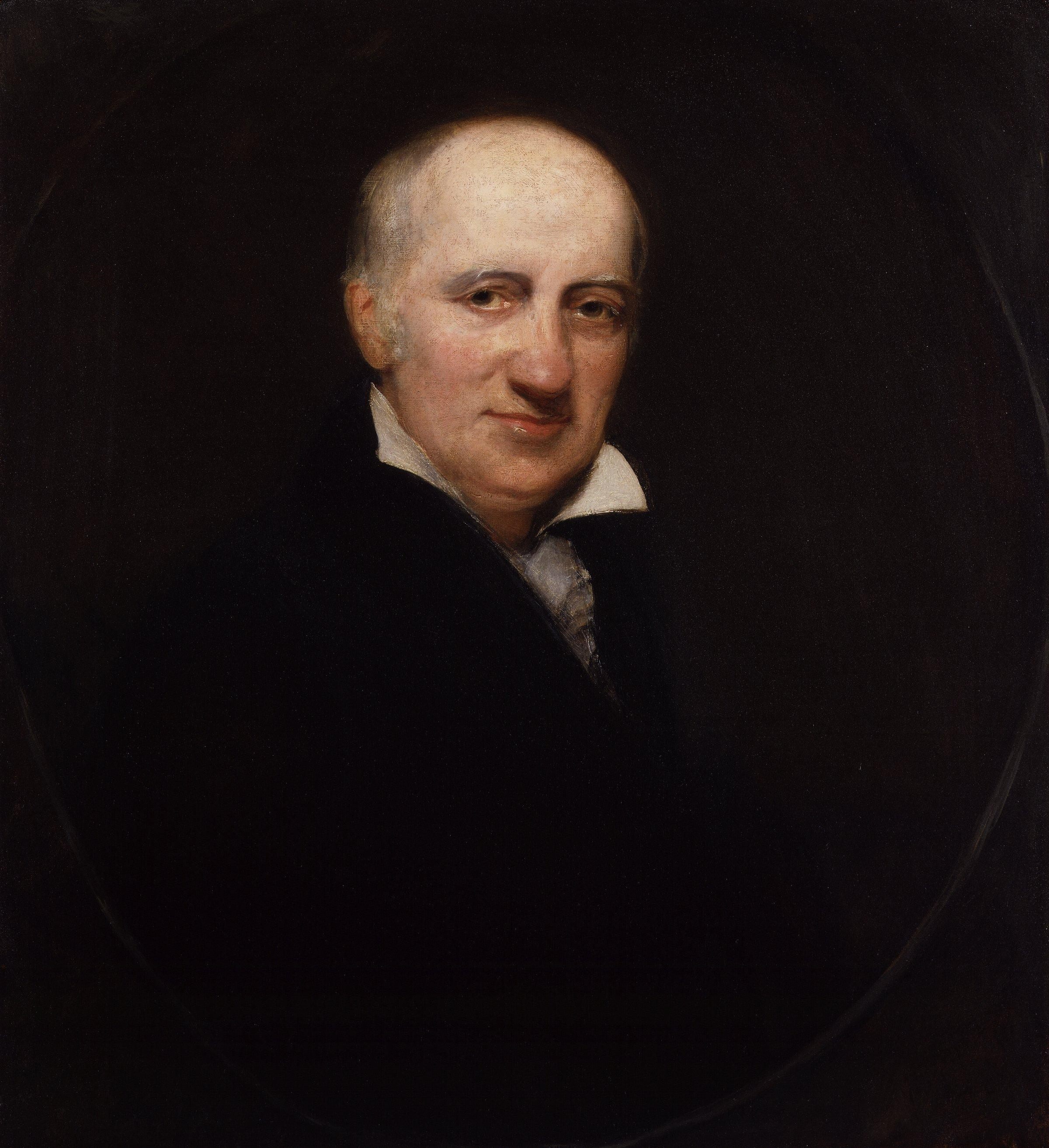
William Godwin

- William Godwin (1756–1836): English journalist, political philosopher and novelist. He is considered one of the first exponents of utilitarianism, and the first modern proponent of anarchism.
- Rebecca Goldstein (1950–): American philosopher of science, and author of Thirty-Six Arguments for the Existence of God: A Work of Fiction.
- Antonio Gramsci (1897–1937): Italian Marxist philosopher, journalist and linguist.
- John Gray (1948–): English political philosopher with interests in analytic philosophy and the history of ideas.
- A. C. Grayling (1949–): British philosopher and author of, among others, Against All Gods: Six Polemics on Religion and an Essay on Kindness.
- Susan Haack (1945–2026): British philosopher of science, Distinguished Professor in the Humanities, Cooper Senior Scholar in Arts and Sciences, Professor of Philosophy, and Professor of Law at the University of Miami. She has written on logic, the philosophy of language, epistemology, and metaphysics.
- Claude Adrien Helvétius (1715–1771): French philosopher whose ethical and social views helped shape the school of utilitarianism, later made famous by Jeremy Bentham.
- Eric Hoffer (1902–1983): American moral and social philosopher. He was the author of ten books and was awarded the Presidential Medal of Freedom in February 1983. His first book, The True Believer, was published in 1951.

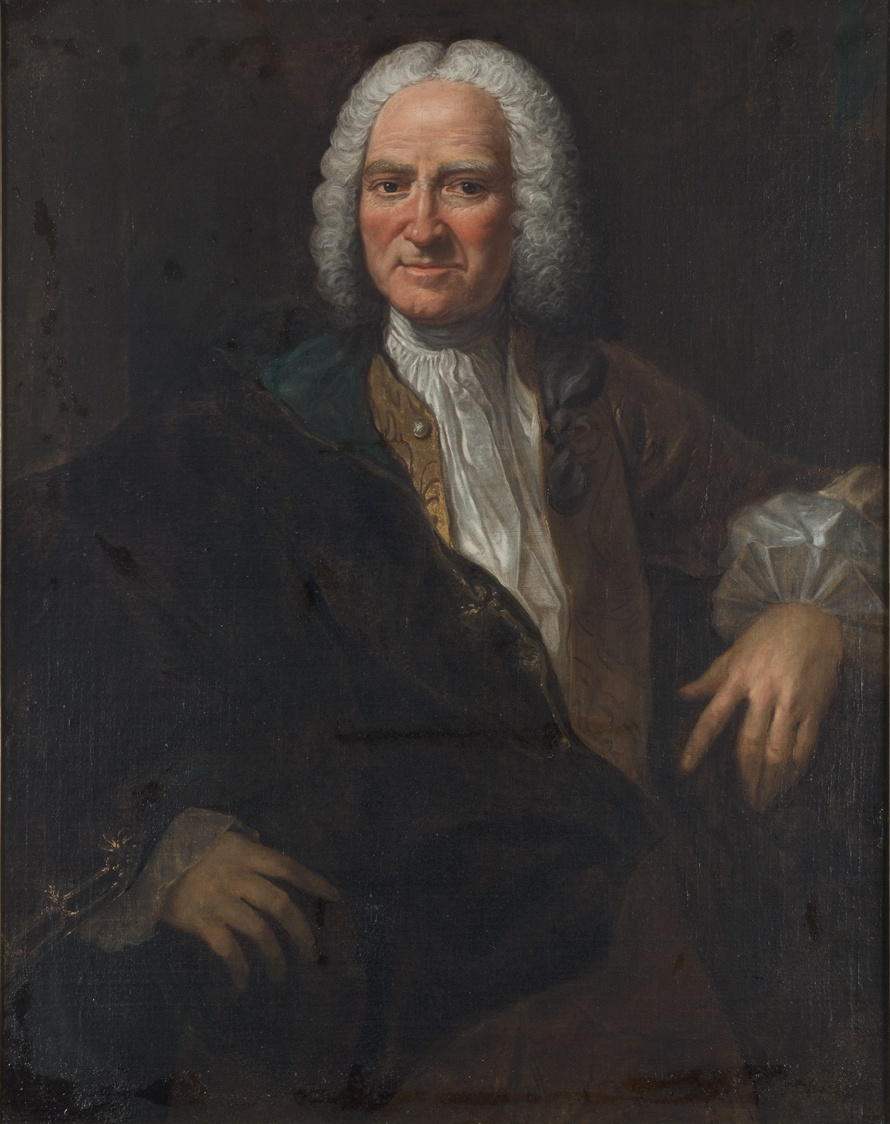
Baron d'Holbach

- Baron d'Holbach (1723–1789): French philosopher and encyclopedist, one of the first outspoken atheists in Europe.

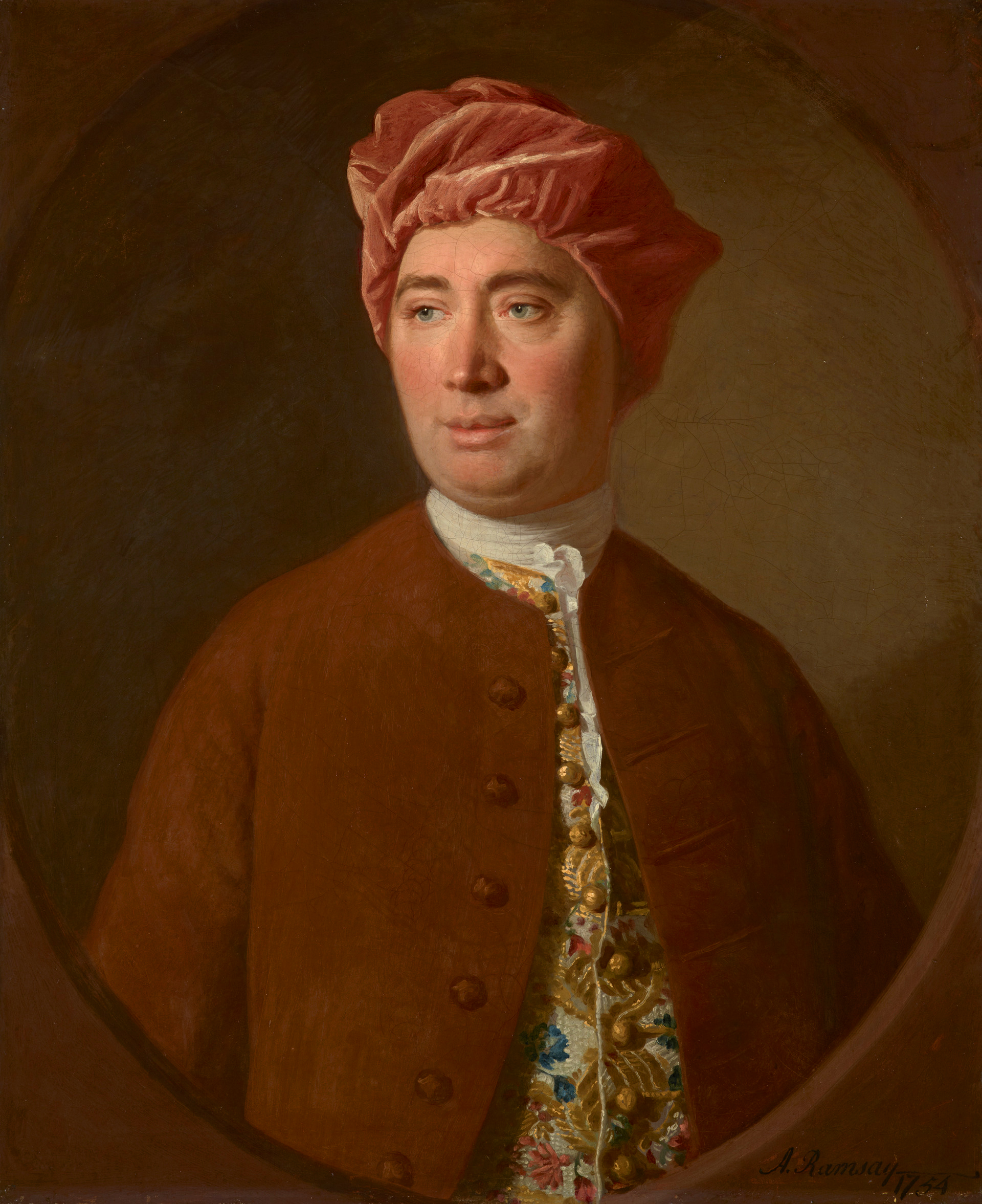
David Hume

- David Hume (1711–1776): Scottish Enlightenment philosopher and historian.
- Eino Kaila (1890–1958): Finnish philosopher, psychologist, and critic who contributed to a variety of fields, including physics and theatre.
- Karl Kautsky (1854–1938): Czech-Austrian philosopher, political activist and Marxist theorist. Author of the work Foundations of Christianity, where he claimed that Christianity can best be explained by historical materialism rather than divinity.
- Ajita Kesakambali (6th century BC): Ancient Indian philosopher who is the first known proponent of Indian materialism.
- Alexandre Kojève (1902–1968): Russian-born French philosopher and statesman.
- Leandro Konder (1936–2014): Brazilian Marxist philosopher.
- Peter Kropotkin (1842–1921): Russian anarchist philosopher, revolutionary socialist and scientist who was an advocate of anarcho-communism.
- Kumārila Bhaṭṭa: Hindu philosopher who attacked theism and defended the idea that the Vedas are eternal and authorless.
- Corliss Lamont (1902–1995): American socialist and humanist philosopher, and advocate of various left-wing and civil liberties causes.
- Stephen Law (1960–): English philosopher and editor of the philosophical journal Think.
- David Kellogg Lewis (1941–2001): American philosopher.
- Peter Lipton (1954–2007): British philosopher, the Hans Rausing Professor and Head of the Department of History and Philosophy of Science at Cambridge University until his unexpected death in November 2007. He was "one of the leading philosophers of science and epistemologists in the world."
- Lucretius (c. 99 BC – c. 55 BC): influential Roman philosopher and early proponent of atheism in 50 BC. Wrote On the Nature of Things, one of the earliest texts in defense of Atheism.
- Jean-François Lyotard (1924–1998): French philosopher, sociologist and literary theorist.

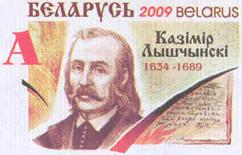
Kazimierz Łyszczyński

- Kazimierz Łyszczyński (also known in English as "Casimir Liszinski"; (1634–1689): Polish-Lithuanian nobleman and philosopher, author of a philosophical treatise, De non existentia Dei (On the Non-existence of God), who was condemned to death and brutally executed for atheism.
- John Leslie Mackie (1917–1981): Australian philosopher who specialized in meta-ethics as a proponent of moral skepticism. Wrote The Miracle of Theism, discussing arguments for and against theism and concluding that theism is rationally untenable.
- Michael Martin (1932–2015): analytic philosopher and professor emeritus at Boston University, author of Atheism: A Philosophical Justification (1989) and The Impossibility of God (2003).
- Harriet Martineau (1802–1876): English writer and philosopher, renowned in her day as a controversial journalist, political economist, abolitionist and lifelong feminist.

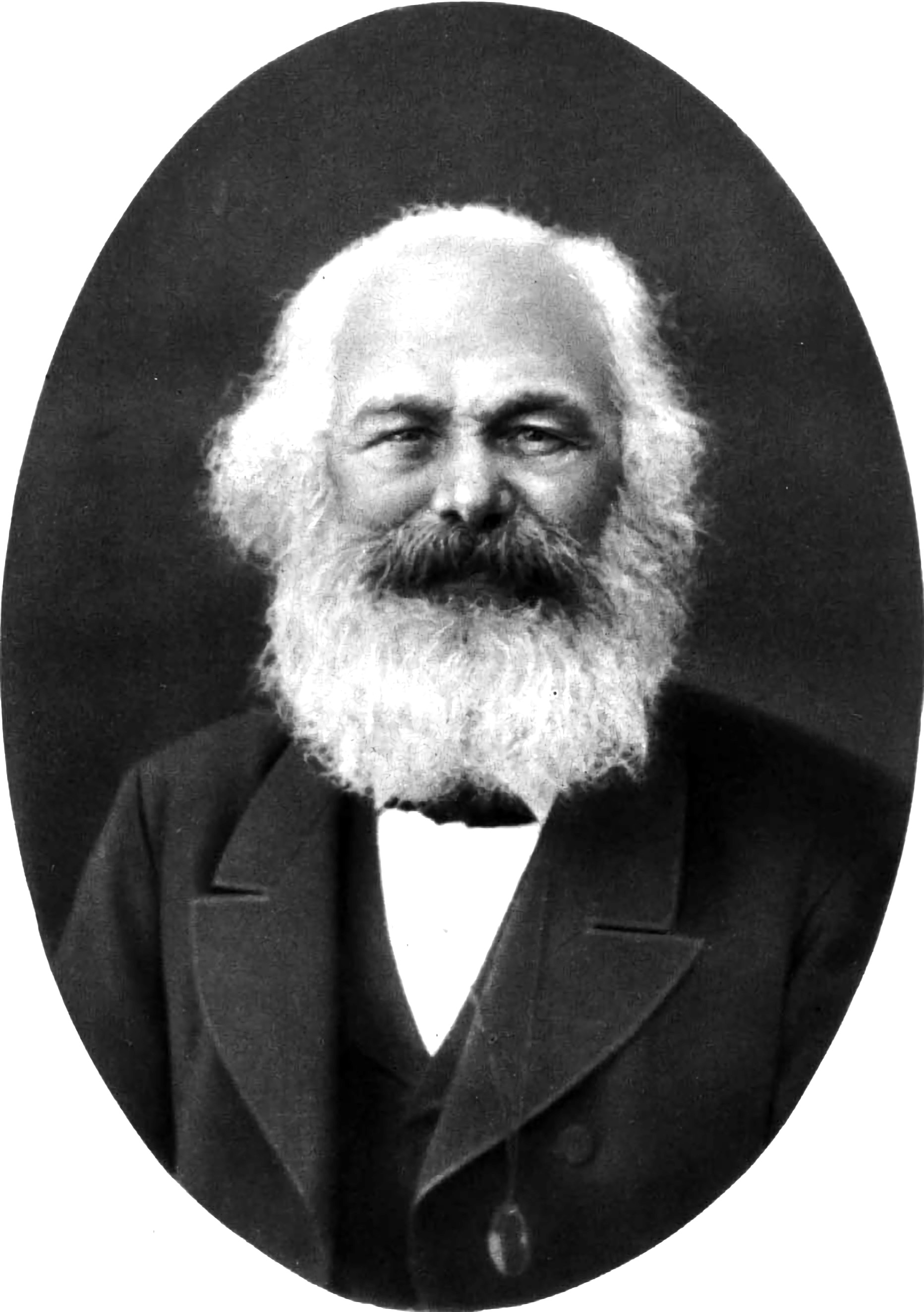
Karl Marx

- Karl Marx (1818–1883): philosopher, political economist, sociologist, political theorist, and revolutionary. Often called the father of communism, Marx was both a scholar and a political activist. In 1843 he published Contribution to Critique of Hegel's Philosophy of Right, in which he dealt more substantively with religion, describing it as "the opiate of the people".
- Todd May (1955–): American political philosopher who writes on topics of anarchism, poststructuralism, and post-structuralist anarchism.
- J. M. E. McTaggart (1866–1925): British philosopher famous for his arguments about the Unreality of Time.
- Jean Meslier (1678–1733): French village Catholic priest who was found, on his death, to have written a book-length philosophical essay, entitled Common Sense but commonly referred to as Meslier's Testament, promoting atheism.
- Julien Offray de La Mettrie (1709–1751): French physician and philosopher, earliest materialist writer of the Enlightenment, claimed as a founder of cognitive science.
- Jacob Moleschott (1822–1893): Dutch physiologist and philosopher, a representative of German materialism
- Susan Neiman (1955–): American moral philosopher, cultural commentator, and essayist, who has written extensively on the juncture between Enlightenment moral philosophy, metaphysics, and politics, both for scholarly audiences and the general public.
- Kai Nielsen (1926–2021): American professor emeritus of philosophy at the University of Calgary.

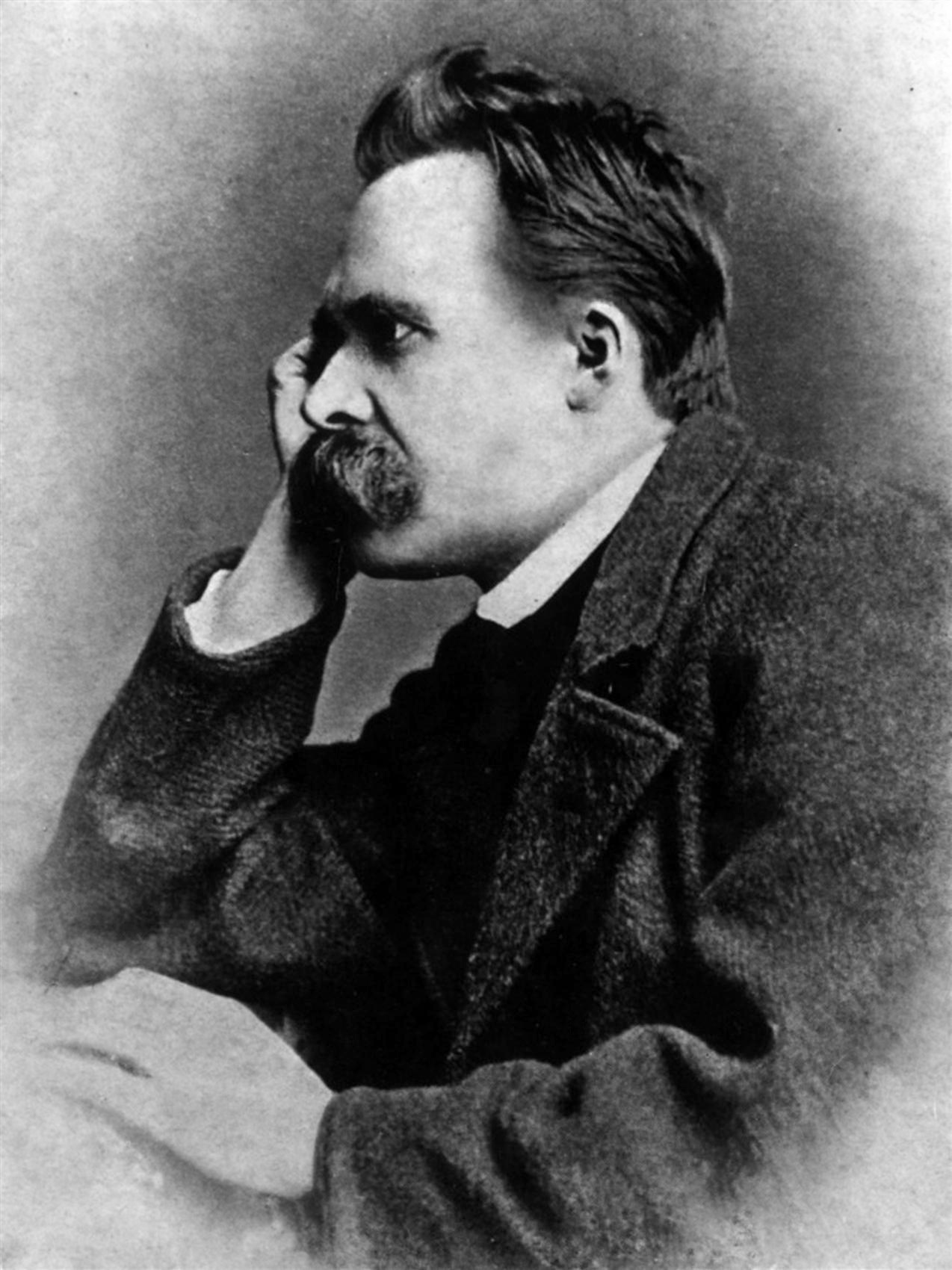
Friedrich Nietzsche

- Friedrich Nietzsche (1844–1900): German philosopher whose Beyond Good and Evil sought to refute traditional notions of morality. Nietzsche penned a memorable secular statement of the Doctrine of Eternal Recurrence in Thus Spoke Zarathustra and is forever associated with the phrase, "God is dead" (first seen in his book, The Gay Science).
- Otto Neurath (1882–1945): Austrian philosopher of science, sociologist, economist and logical positivist who was a founding member of the Vienna Circle.
- Michel Onfray (1958–): French writer, philosopher, founder of Université populaire de Caen, and author of Atheist Manifesto: The Case Against Christianity, Judaism, and Islam.
- Graham Oppy (1960–): Australian philosopher and Associate Dean of Research at Monash University, and Associate Editor of the Australasian Journal of Philosophy. His main area of research is the philosophy of religion.
- José Ortega y Gasset (1883–1955): Spanish philosopher, author, and essayist who wrote The Revolt of the Masses.
- Massimo Pigliucci (1964–): Italian philosopher of science, outspoken critic of creationism, and advocate of science education.
- Georgi Plekhanov (1856–1918): Russian philosopher, revolutionary and Marxist theorist, known as the father of Russian Marxism.
- Arthur Prior (1914–1969): New Zealand born logician and philosopher credited with the creation of tense logic and substantial contributions to intensional logic.
- Pierre-Joseph Proudhon (1809–1865): French philosopher, economist, political activist, anarchist and one of the founders of mutualism.
- Hilary Putnam (1926–2016): American philosopher, mathematician, and computer scientist who was a central figure in analytic philosophy from the 1960s, especially in philosophy of mind, philosophy of language, philosophy of mathematics, and philosophy of science.
- Willard Van Orman Quine (1908–2000): American philosopher and logician.
- James Rachels (1941–2003): American philosopher who specialized in ethics.
- Periyar E. V. Ramasamy, also known as Thanthai Periyar (1879–1973): Indian philosopher, social activist, politician and businessman (affectionately called by his followers as Periyar or E. V. R.), who started the Self-Respect Movement or the Dravidian Movement. He is also the founder of the political party Dravidar Kazhagam.
- Frank P. Ramsey (1903–1930): British mathematician who also made significant contributions in philosophy and economics.
- Ayn Rand (1905–1982): Russian-American founder of Objectivism and novelist.
- Goparaju Ramachandra Rao (1902-1975): Popularly known as Gora, Rao was an Indian social reformer, atheist activist and a participant in the Indian independence movement. He propagated positive atheism by his articles, speeches, books and his social work.
- John Rawls (1921–2002): American philosopher and a leading figure in moral and political philosophy.
- Jean-François Revel (1924–2006): French politician, journalist, author, prolific philosopher and member of the Académie française.
- Richard Rorty (1931–2007): American philosopher.
- Alexander Rosenberg (1946–): American philosopher and author of The Atheist's Guide to Reality.
- Michael Ruse (1940–2024): British philosopher of science, known for his criticism of creationism.

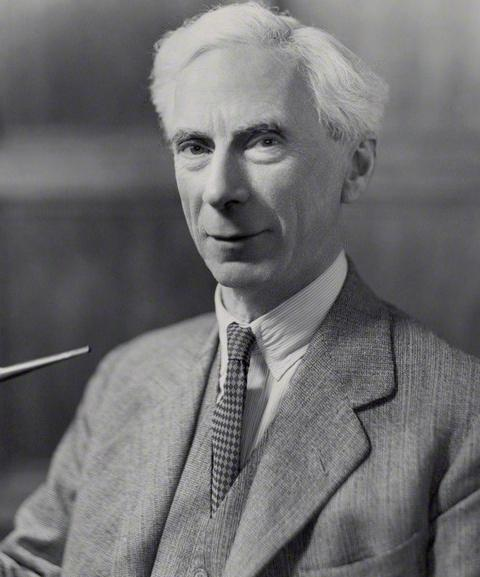
Bertrand Russell

- Bertrand Russell (1872–1970): British philosopher, logician, mathematician, historian, and social critic.

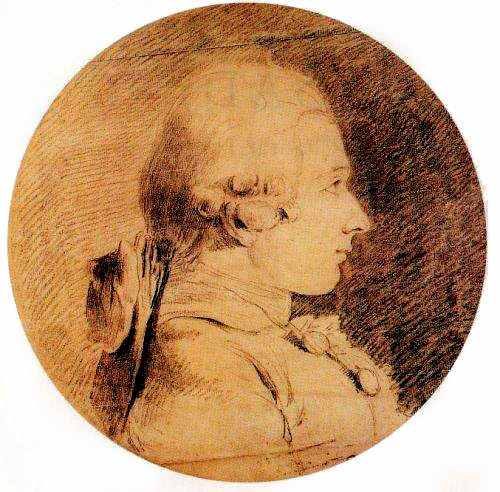
Marquis de Sade

- Marquis de Sade (1740–1814): French aristocrat, revolutionary politician, philosopher, and writer, famous for his libertine sexuality.

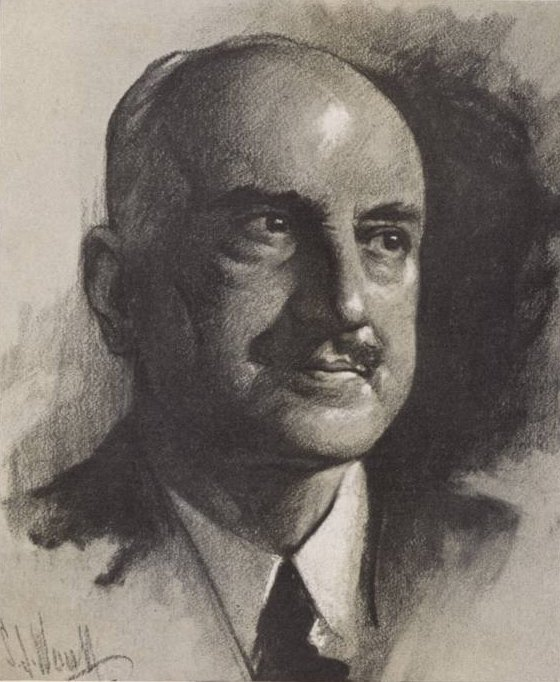
George Santayana

- George Santayana (1863–1952): Philosopher in the naturalist and pragmatist traditions who called himself a "Catholic atheist".

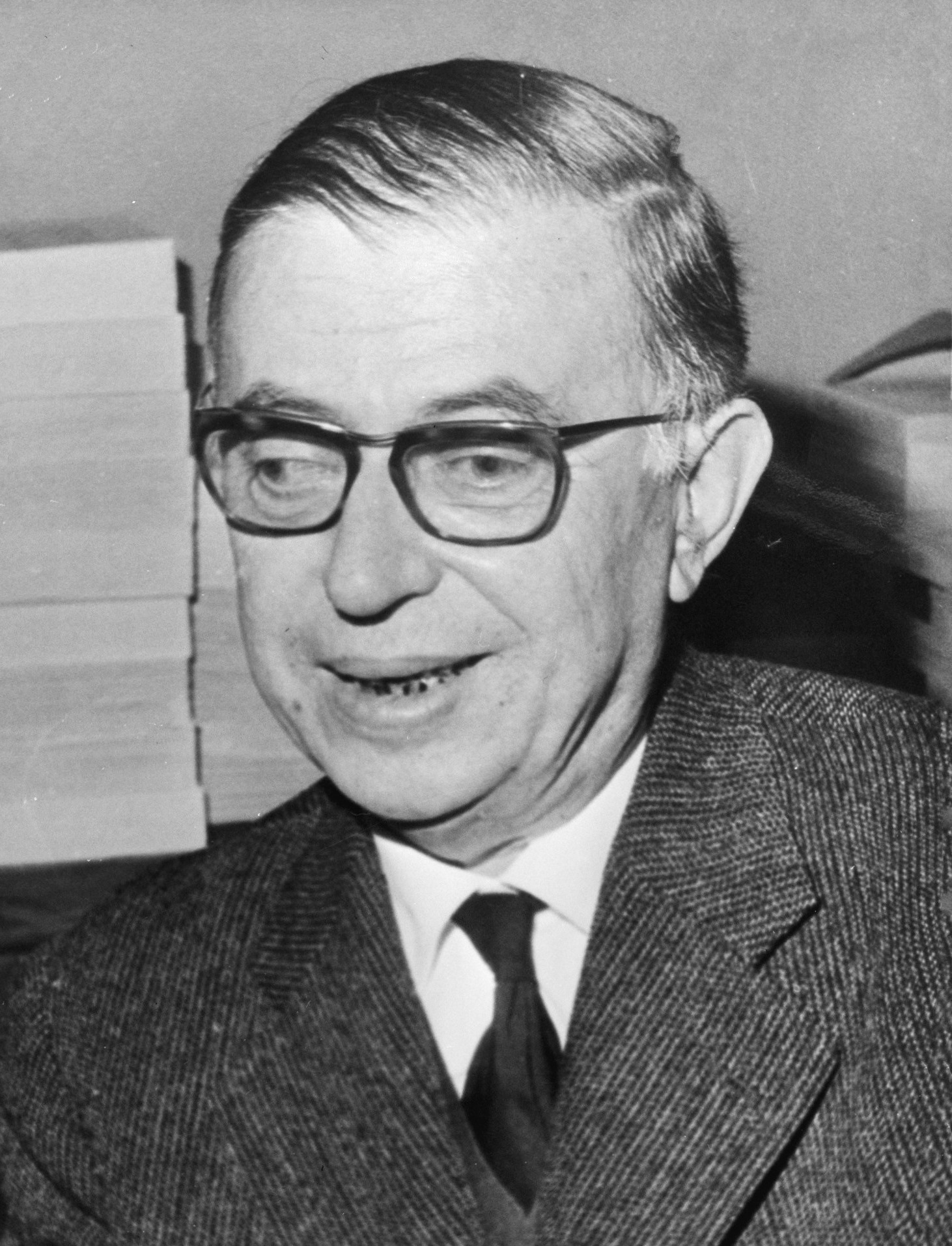
Jean-Paul Sartre

- Jean-Paul Sartre (1905–1980): French existentialist philosopher, dramatist and novelist who declared that he had been an atheist from age twelve. Although he regarded God as a self-contradictory concept, he still thought of it as an ideal toward which people strive. According to Sartre, his most-repeated summary of his existentialist philosophy, "Existence precedes essence", implies that humans must abandon traditional notions of having been designed by a divine creator.

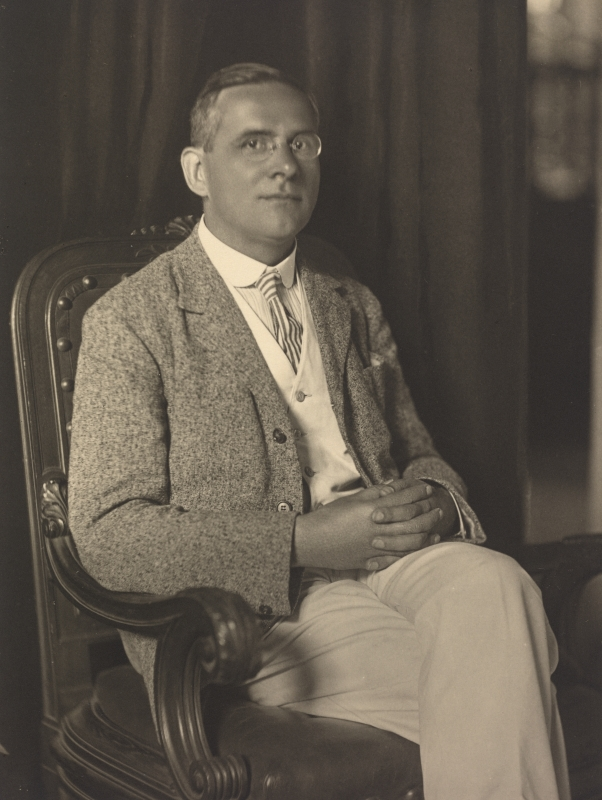
Moritz Schlick

- Moritz Schlick (1882–1936): German philosopher, physicist and the founding father of logical positivism and the Vienna Circle.
- Michael Schmidt-Salomon (1967–): German author, philosopher, and public relations manager. He was chairman of the Giordano Bruno Foundation, "a humanist organization that is critical of religion".

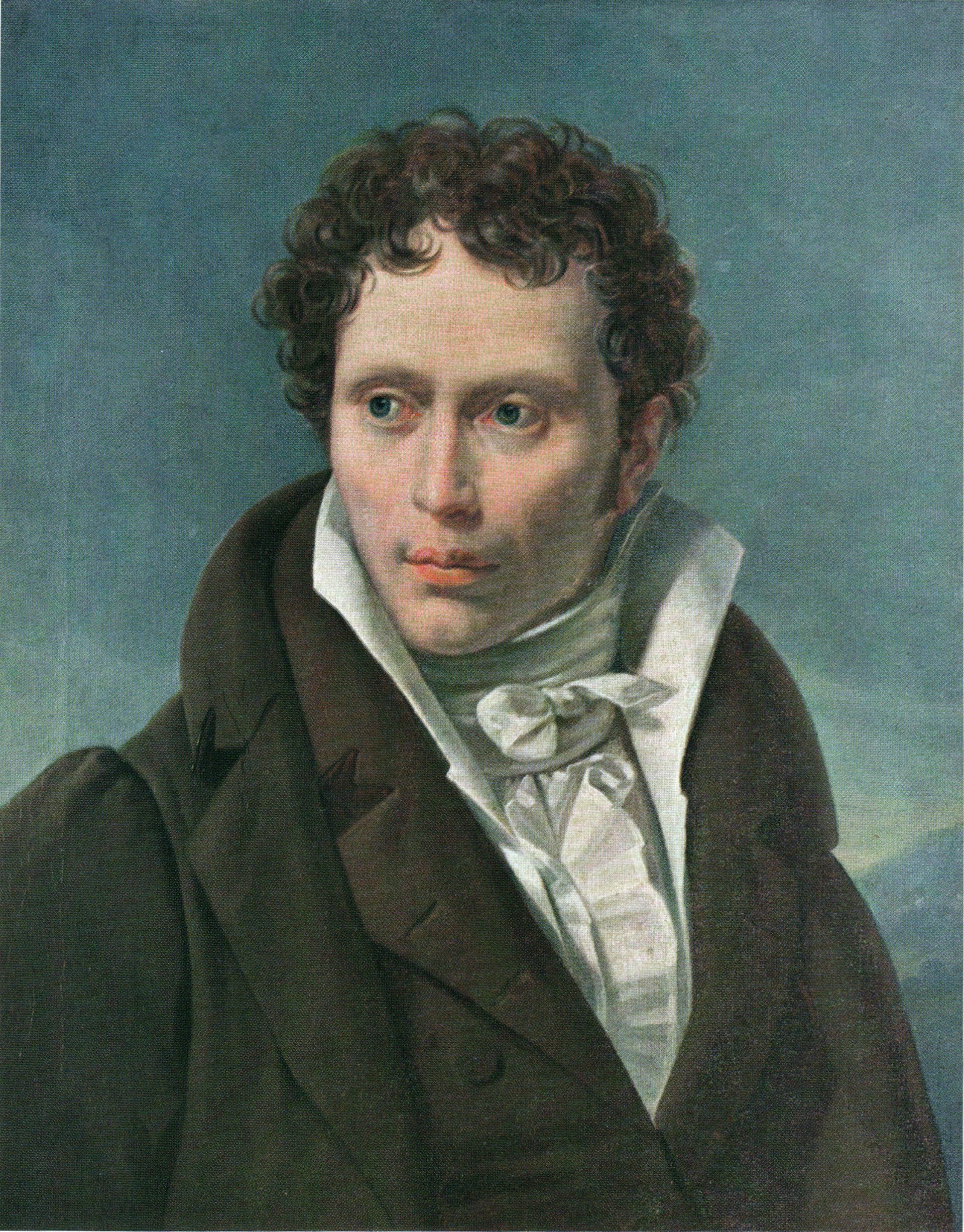
Arthur Schopenhauer

- Arthur Schopenhauer (1788–1860): German philosopher and author of the book The World as Will and Representation.

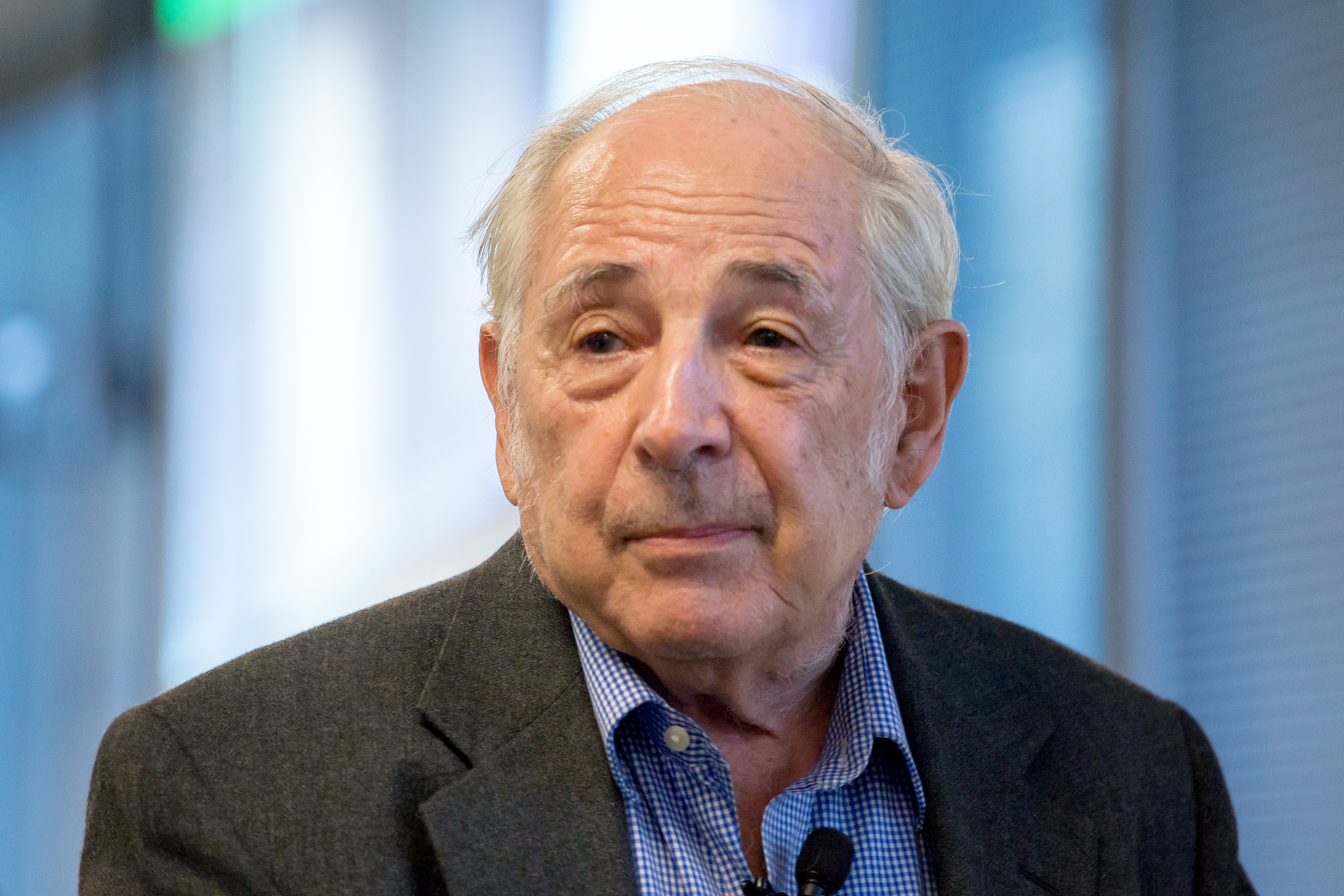
John R. Searle

- John R. Searle (1932–2025): American philosopher widely noted for contributions to the philosophy of language, the philosophy of mind, and to social philosophy.
- Percy Bysshe Shelley (1792–1822): English writer and poet. He is known for writing "The Necessity of Atheism" and working in advocacy of atheism as a romantic poet.
- Boris Sidis (1867–1923): Ukrainian psychologist, physician, psychiatrist, and philosopher of education.

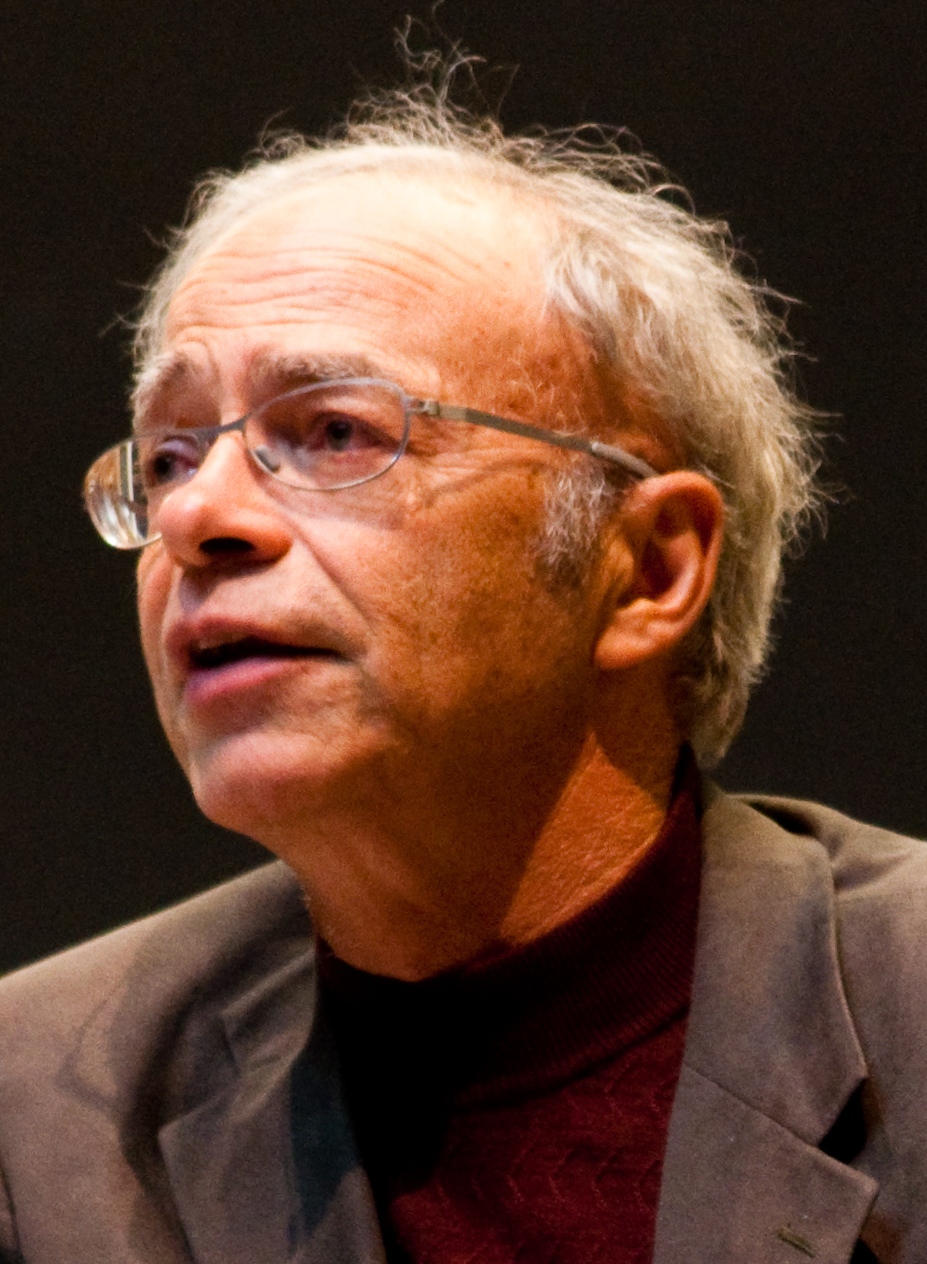
Peter Singer

- Peter Singer (1946–): Australian utilitarian philosopher, proponent of animal rights, and Ira W. DeCamp Professor of Bioethics at Princeton University.
- Walter Sinnott-Armstrong (1955–): American philosopher who specializes in neuroethics, epistemology, and the philosophy of law.
- B. F. Skinner (1904–1990): American psychologist, behaviorist, author, inventor, social philosopher and poet.
- George H. Smith (1949–2022): American political philosopher, author, and educator. Smith authored Atheism: The Case Against God.
- Quentin Smith (1952–2020): philosopher of science who co-authored the book Theism, Atheism and Big Bang Cosmology with William Lane Craig.

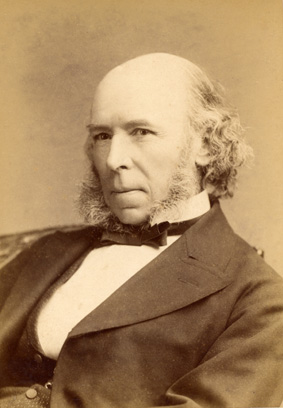
Herbert Spencer

- Herbert Spencer (1820–1903): English philosopher, biologist, sociologist, and prominent classical liberal political theorist of the Victorian era.

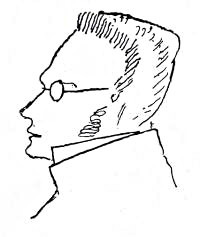
Max Stirner

- Max Stirner (1806–1856): German philosopher, who ranks as one of the fathers of nihilism, existentialism, post-modernism and anarchism, especially of individualist anarchism. Stirner's main work was The Ego and Its Own.
- Theodorus the Atheist (lived around 300 BC): philosopher of the Cyrenaic school who taught that the goal of life was to obtain joy and avoid grief.
- Michael Tooley (1941–): American philosopher of science and professor of philosophy at the University of Colorado Boulder.
- Nick Trakakis (1972–): Greek philosopher at the Australian Catholic University, where he is Assistant Director of the recently established Centre for Philosophy and Phenomenology of Religion.

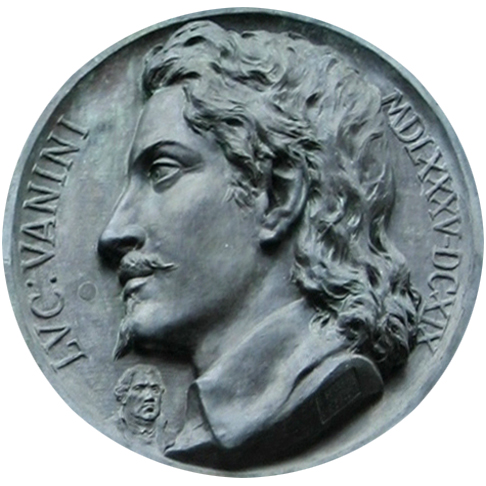
Lucilio Vanini

- Lucilio Vanini (1585–1619): Italian philosopher, brutally executed for his atheism.

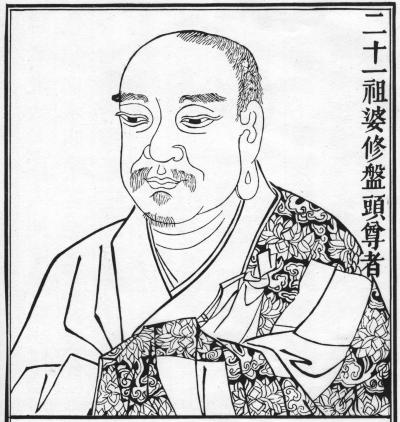
Vasubandhu

- Vasubandhu (4th to 5th century CE): Buddhist monk and philosopher who composed a series of arguments debunking the idea of a Creator God.

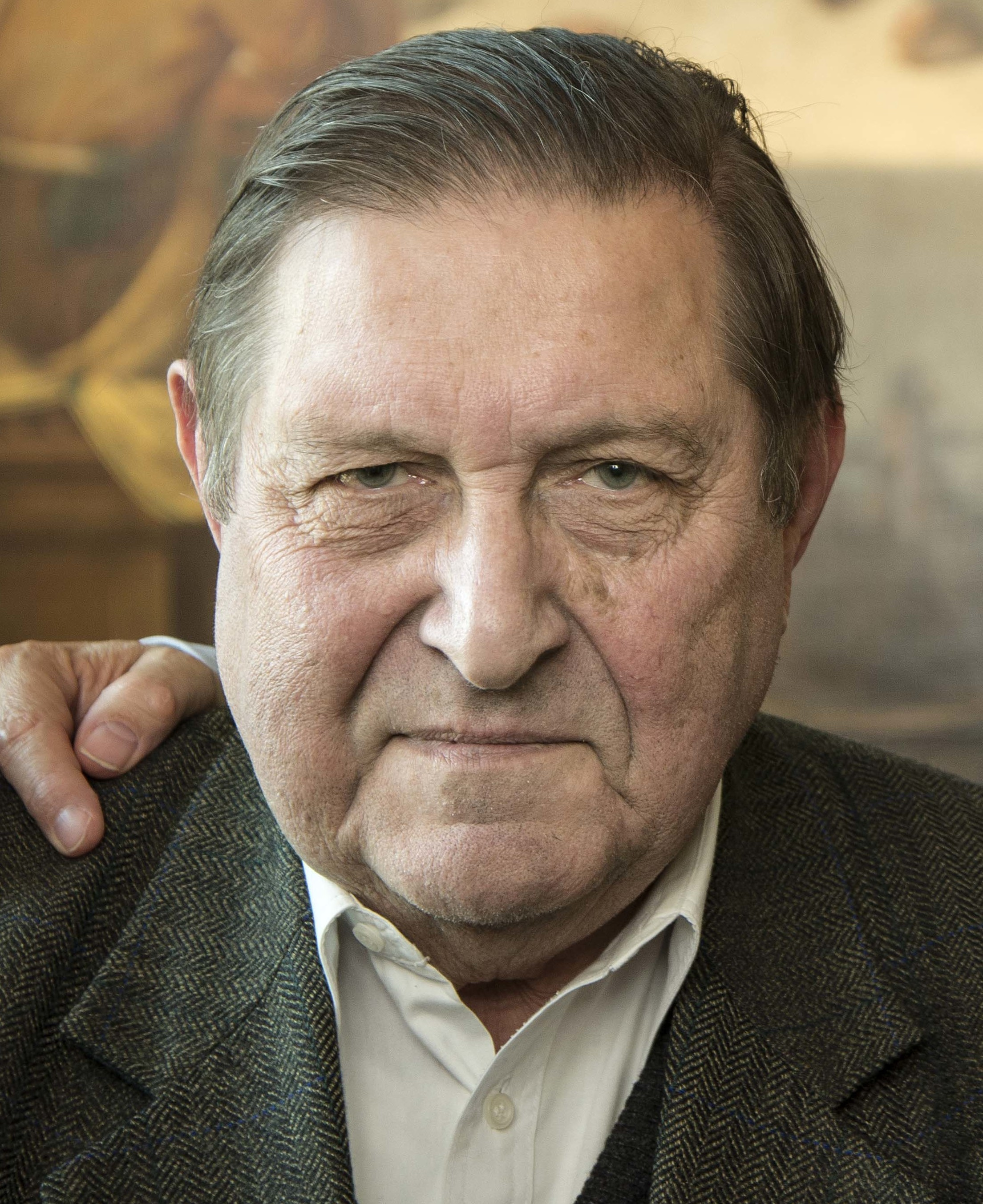
Etienne Vermeersch

- Etienne Vermeersch (1934–2019): Belgian bioethics professor, philosopher of science, and leading skeptic. In 1960, after five years' strong commitment to the Society of Jesus (Jesuits), Vermeersch became an atheist and philosophical materialist. He was a founding father of Belgian abortion and euthanasia law, and served as vice-rector of Ghent University. In the 1990s he wrote the influential piece, "Why the Christian God Cannot Exist". In January 2008 a hundred prominent Flemings voted him the most influential Flemish intellectual.
- Sir Bernard Williams FBA (1929–2003): British moral philosopher.
- Sherwin Wine (1928–2007): founder of the non-theistic Society for Humanistic Judaism, who has also called himself an "ignostic".
- Jan Woleński (1940–): Polish philosopher specializing in the history of the Lwów-Warsaw school and in analytic philosophy. He is recognized in Poland as an atheist and has promoted the replacement of religion classes with philosophy classes in Polish schools.

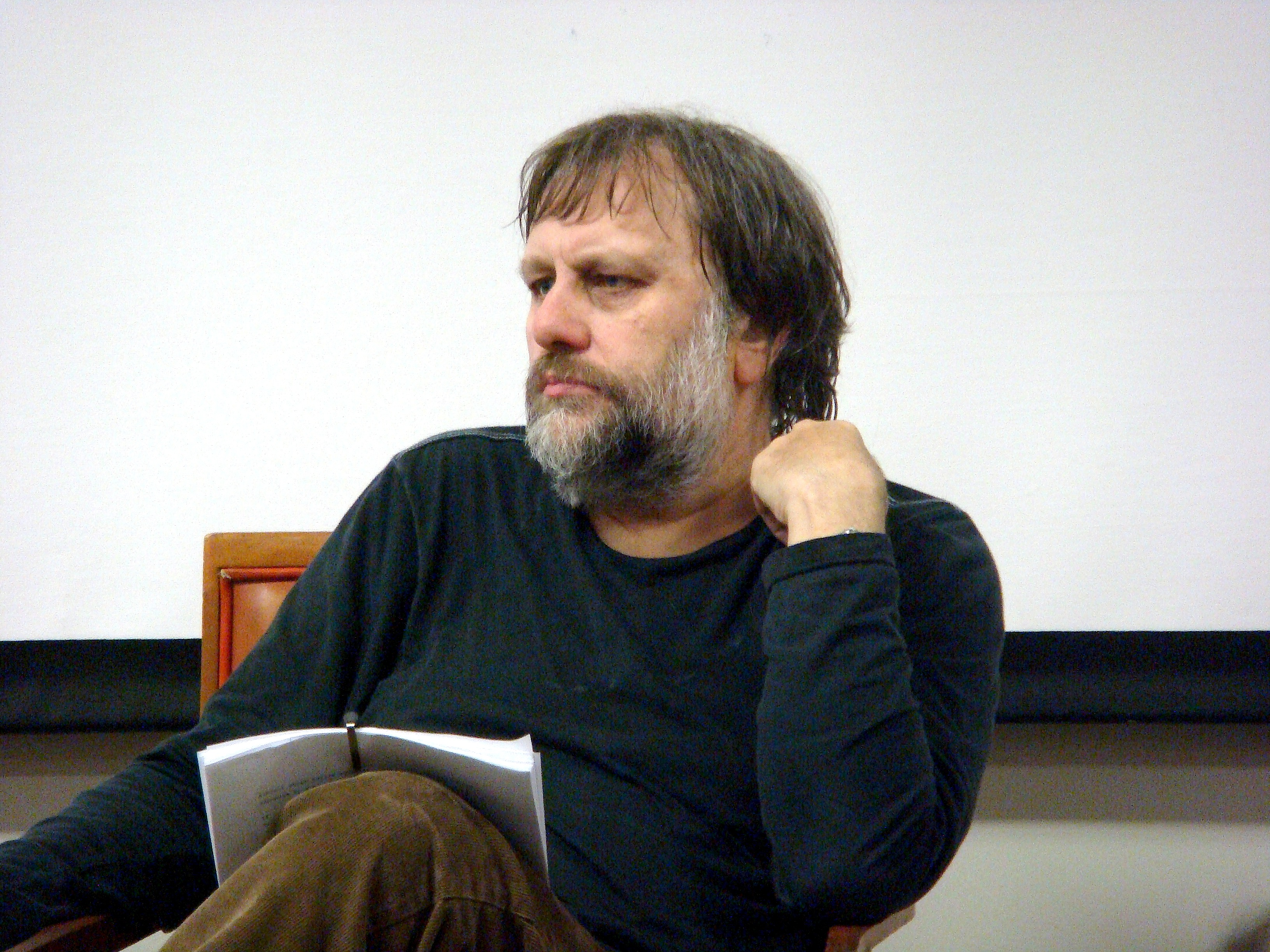
Slavoj Žižek

- Slavoj Žižek (1949–): Slovenian philosopher, political activist, and writer.

== Bibliography ==
- Haught, James A. 2,000 Years of Disbelief: Famous People with the Courage to Doubt. Amherst: Prometheus Books, 1996. ISBN 1-57392-067-3.
