= Pascal's wager =

Argument for the belief in God

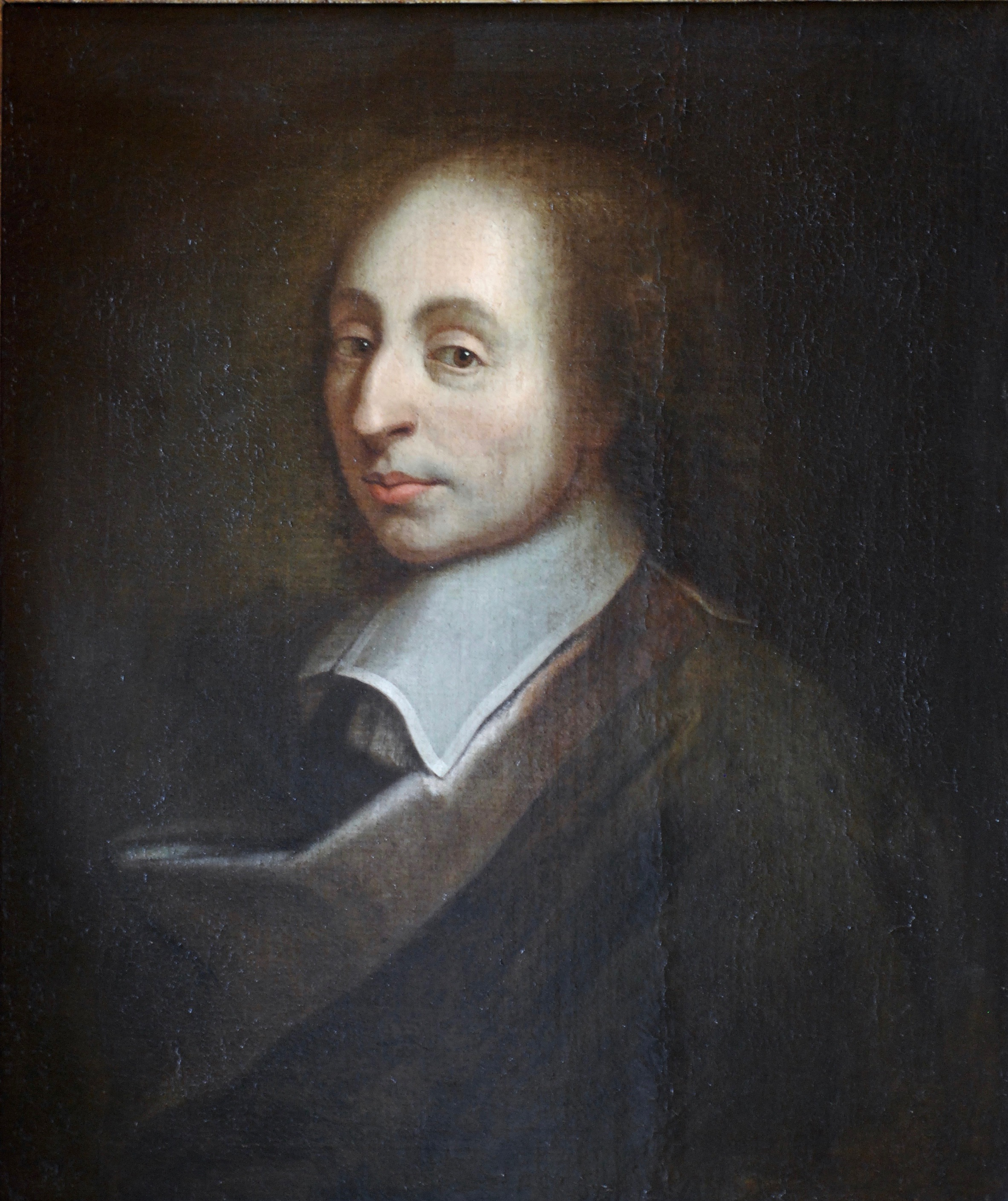
Blaise Pascal (1623–1662)

Pascal's wager is a philosophical argument advanced by Blaise Pascal (1623–1662), a French mathematician, philosopher, physicist, and theologian. This argument posits that individuals essentially engage in a life-defining gamble regarding the belief in the existence of God.

Pascal contends that a rational person should adopt a lifestyle consistent with the existence of God and should strive to believe in God. The reasoning for this stance involves the potential outcomes: if God does not exist, the believer incurs only finite losses, potentially sacrificing certain pleasures and luxuries; if God does exist, the believer stands to gain immeasurably, as represented for example by an eternity in Heaven in Abrahamic tradition, while simultaneously avoiding boundless losses associated with an eternity in Hell.

The first written expression of this wager is in Pascal's Pensées ("Thoughts"), a posthumous compilation of previously unpublished notes. Pascal's wager is the first formal application of decision theory.

Critics of Pascal's wager question the ability to provide definitive proof of God's existence. The argument from inconsistent revelations highlights the presence of various belief systems, each claiming exclusive access to divine truths. Additionally, the argument from inauthentic belief raises concerns about the genuineness of faith in God if it is motivated solely by potential benefits and losses.

== The wager ==
The wager uses the following logic (excerpts from Pensées, part III, §233):

- "God is, or God is not. Reason cannot decide between the two alternatives"
- "A Game is being played ... where heads or tails will turn up"
- "You must wager; it is not optional"
- "Let us weigh the gain and the loss in wagering that God is. Let us estimate these two chances. If you gain, you gain all; if you lose, you lose nothing"
- "Wager, then, without hesitation that He is. ... There is here an infinity of an infinitely happy life to gain, a chance of gain against a finite number of chances of loss, and what you stake is finite. And so our proposition is of infinite force when there is the finite to stake in a game where there are equal risks of gain and of loss, and the infinite to gain."
- "But some cannot believe. They should then 'at least learn your inability to believe...' and 'Endeavour then to convince' themselves."

Pascal asks the reader to analyze humankind's position, where our actions can be enormously consequential, but our understanding of those consequences is flawed. While we can discern a great deal through reason, we are ultimately forced to gamble. Pascal cites a number of distinct areas of uncertainty in human life:

Category	Quotation(s)
Uncertainty in all	"This is what I see, and what troubles me. I look on all sides, and everywhere I see nothing but obscurity. Nature offers me nothing that is not a matter of doubt and disquiet."
Uncertainty in man's purpose	"For after all what is man in nature? A nothing in relation to infinity, all in relation to nothing, a central point between nothing and all and infinitely far from understanding either."
Uncertainty in reason	"There is nothing so conformable to reason as this disavowal of reason."
Uncertainty in science	"There is no doubt that natural laws exist, but once this fine reason of ours was corrupted, it corrupted everything."
Uncertainty in religion	"If I saw no signs of a divinity, I would fix myself in denial. If I saw everywhere the marks of a Creator, I would repose peacefully in faith. But seeing too much to deny Him, and too little to assure me, I am in a pitiful state, and I would wish a hundred times that if a god sustains nature it would reveal Him without ambiguity." "We understand nothing of the works of God unless we take it as a principle that He wishes to blind some and to enlighten others."
Uncertainty in skepticism	"It is not certain that everything is uncertain."

Pascal describes humanity as a finite being trapped within divine incomprehensibility, briefly thrust into being from non-being, with no explanation of "Why?" or "What?" or "How?" On Pascal's view, human finitude constrains our ability to achieve truth reliably.

Given that reason alone cannot determine whether God exists, Pascal concludes that this question functions as a coin toss. However, even if we do not know the outcome of this coin toss, we must base our actions on some expectation about the consequence. We must decide whether to live as though God exists, or whether to live as though God does not exist, even though we may be mistaken in either case.

In Pascal's assessment, participation in this wager is not optional. Merely by existing in a state of uncertainty, we are forced to choose between the available courses of action for practical purposes.

== Pascal's description of the wager ==
The Pensées passage on Pascal's wager is as follows:

If there is a God, He is infinitely incomprehensible, since, having neither parts nor limits, He has no affinity to us. We are then incapable of knowing either what He is or if He is. ...

... "God is, or He is not." But to which side shall we incline? Reason can decide nothing here. There is infinite chaos that separated us. A game is being played at the extremity of this infinite distance where heads or tails will turn up. What will you wager? According to reason, you can do neither the one thing nor the other; according to reason, you can defend neither of the propositions.

Do not, then, reprove for error those who have made a choice; for you know nothing about it. "No, but I blame them for having made, not this choice, but a choice; for again both he who chooses heads and he who chooses tails are equally at fault, they are both in the wrong. The true course is not to wager at all."

Yes; but you must wager. It is not optional. You are embarked. Which will you choose then? Let us see. Since you must choose, let us see which interests you least. You have two things to lose, the true and the good; and two things to stake, your reason and your will, your knowledge and your happiness; and your nature has two things to shun, error and misery. Your reason is no more shocked in choosing one rather than the other since you must of necessity choose. This is one point settled. But your happiness? Let us weigh the gain and the loss in wagering that God is. Let us estimate these two chances. If you gain, you gain all; if you lose, you lose nothing. Wager, then, without hesitation that He is.

"That is very fine. Yes, I must wager; but I may perhaps wager too much." Let us see. Since there is an equal risk of gain and of loss, if you had only to gain two lives, instead of one, you might still wager. But if there were three lives to gain, you would have to play (since you are under the necessity of playing), and you would be imprudent, when you are forced to play, not to change your life to gain three at a game where there is an equal risk of loss and gain. But there is an eternity of life and happiness. And this being so, if there were an infinity of chances, of which one only would be for you, you would still be right in wagering one to win two, and you would act stupidly, being obliged to play, by refusing to stake one life against three at a game in which out of an infinity of chances there is one for you if there were an infinity of an infinitely happy life to gain. But there is here an infinity of an infinitely happy life to gain, a chance of gain against a finite number of chances of loss, and what you stake is finite.

Pascal begins by painting a situation where both the existence and non-existence of God are impossible to prove by human reason. So, supposing that reason cannot determine the truth between the two options, one must "wager" by weighing the possible consequences. Pascal's assumption is that, when it comes to making the decision, no one can refuse to participate; withholding assent is impossible because we are already "embarked", effectively living out the choice.

We only have two things to stake, our "reason" and our "happiness". Pascal considers that if there is "equal risk of loss and gain" (i.e. a coin toss), then human reason is powerless to address the question of whether God exists. That being the case, then human reason can only decide the question according to possible resulting happiness of the decision, weighing the gain and loss in believing that God exists and likewise in believing that God does not exist.

He points out that if a wager were between the equal chance of gaining two lifetimes of happiness and gaining nothing, then a person would be a fool to bet on the latter. The same would go if it were three lifetimes of happiness versus nothing. He then argues that it is simply unconscionable by comparison to bet against an eternal life of happiness for the possibility of gaining nothing. The wise decision is to wager that God exists, since "If you gain, you gain all; if you lose, you lose nothing", meaning one can gain eternal life if God exists, but if not, one will be no worse off in death than if one had not believed. On the other hand, if you bet against God, win or lose, you either gain nothing or lose everything. You are either unavoidably annihilated (in which case, nothing matters one way or the other) or miss the opportunity of eternal happiness. In note 194, speaking about those who live apathetically betting against God, he sums up by remarking, "It is to the glory of religion to have for enemies men so unreasonable".

=== Inability to believe ===
Pascal addressed the difficulty that reason and rationality pose to genuine belief by proposing that "acting as if [one] believed" could "cure [one] of unbelief":

But at least learn your inability to believe, since reason brings you to this, and yet you cannot believe. Endeavor then to convince yourself, not by increase of proofs of God, but by the abatement of your passions. You would like to attain faith, and do not know the way; you would like to cure yourself of unbelief and ask the remedy for it. Learn of those who have been bound like you, and who now stake all their possessions. These are people who know the way which you would follow, and who are cured of an ill of which you would be cured. Follow the way by which they began; by acting as if they believed, taking the holy water, having masses said, etc. Even this will naturally make you believe, and deaden your acuteness.

=== Analysis with decision theory ===
The possibilities defined by Pascal's wager can be thought of as a decision under uncertainty with the values of the following decision matrix.

	God exists (G)	God does not exist (¬G)
Belief (B)	+∞ (infinite gain)	−c (finite loss)
Disbelief (¬B)	−∞ (infinite loss)	+c (finite gain)

Given these values, the option of living as if God exists (B) always has a greater expected value than the option of living as if God does not exist (¬B), as long as one assumes a positive probability that God exists.

In fact, according to decision theory, the only value that matters in the above matrix is the +∞ (infinitely positive). Any matrix of the following type (where f_{1}, f_{2}, and f_{3} are all negative or finite positive numbers) results in (B) as being the only rational decision.

	God exists (G)	God does not exist (¬G)
Belief (B)	+∞	f_{1}
Disbelief (¬B)	f_{2}	f_{3}

=== Misunderstanding of the wager ===
Pascal's intent was not to provide an argument to convince atheists to believe, but (a) to show the fallacy of attempting to use logical reasoning to prove or disprove God, and (b) to persuade atheists to sinlessness, as an aid to attaining faith ("it is this which will lessen the passions, which are your stumbling-blocks"). As Laurent Thirouin writes (note that the numbering of the items in the Pensees is not standardized; Thirouin's 418 is this article's 233):

The celebrity of fragment 418 has been established at the price of mutilation. By titling this text "the wager", readers have been fixated only on one part of Pascal's reasoning. It doesn't conclude with a QED at the end of the mathematical part. The unbeliever who had provoked this long analysis to counter his previous objection ("Maybe I bet too much") is still not ready to join the apologist on the side of faith. He put forward two new objections, undermining the foundations of the wager: the impossibility to know, and the obligation of playing.

To be put at the beginning of Pascal's planned book, the wager was meant to show that logical reasoning cannot support faith or lack thereof:

We have to accept reality and accept the reaction of the libertine when he rejects arguments he is unable to counter. The conclusion is evident: if men believe or refuse to believe, it is not how some believers sometimes say and most unbelievers claim because their own reason justifies the position they have adopted. Belief in God doesn't depend upon rational evidence, no matter which position.

Frederick Copleston writes that Pascal did not intend the wager as proof of God's existence or even a substitute for such proofs. He argues that the wager must be understood in the context of Pascal addressing the wager to those who "though they are also unconvinced by the arguments of sceptics and atheists" also "remain in a state of suspended judgment". Pascal's aim was to prepare "their minds and the production of dispositions favourable to belief".

== Criticism ==
=== Failure to prove the existence of God ===
Voltaire (another prominent French writer of the age of Enlightenment), a generation after Pascal, regarded the idea of the wager as a "proof of God" as "indecent and childish", adding, "the interest I have to believe a thing is no proof that such a thing exists". Pascal, however, did not advance the wager as a proof of God's existence but rather as a necessary pragmatic decision which is "impossible to avoid" for any living person. He argued that abstaining from making a wager is not an option and that "reason is incapable of divining the truth"; thus, a decision of whether to believe in the existence of God must be made by "considering the consequences of each possibility".

Voltaire's critique concerns not the nature of the Pascalian wager as proof of God's existence, but the contention that the very belief Pascal tried to promote is not convincing. Voltaire hints at the fact that Pascal, as a Jansenist, believed that only a small, and already predestined, portion of humanity would eventually be saved by God.

Voltaire explained that no matter how far someone is tempted with rewards to believe in Christian salvation, the result will be at best a faint belief. (Note: Vous me promettez l’empire du monde si je crois que vous avez raison: je souhaite alors, de tout mon coeur, que vous ayez raison; mais jusqu’à ce que vous me l’ayez prouvé, je ne puis vous croire. […] J’ai intérêt, sans doute, qu’il y ait un Dieu; mais si dans votre système Dieu n’est venu que pour si peu de personnes; si le petit nombre des élus est si effrayant; si je ne puis rien du tout par moi-même, dites-moi, je vous prie, quel intérêt j’ai à vous croire? N’ai-je pas un intérêt visible à être persuadé du contraire? De quel front osez-vous me montrer un bonheur infini, auquel d’un million d’hommes un seul à peine a droit d’aspirer? [You promise me the empire of the world if I believe you are right: I then hope, with all my heart, that you are right; but until you prove it to me, I cannot believe you. […] It is in my interest, no doubt, that there is a God; but if in your system God only came for so few people; if the number of the elect is so frighteningly small; if I can do nothing at all for myself, please tell me, what interest do I have in believing you? Don’t I have a visible interest in being convinced otherwise? How dare you show me an infinite happiness, to which barely one in a million men can aspire?]) Pascal, in his Pensées, agrees with this, not stating that people can choose to believe (and therefore make a safe wager), but rather that some cannot believe.

As Étienne Souriau explained, in order to accept Pascal's argument, the bettor needs to be certain that God seriously intends to honour the bet; he says that the wager assumes that God also accepts the bet, which is not proved; Pascal's bettor is here like the fool who seeing a leaf floating on a river's waters and quivering at some point, for a few seconds, between the two sides of a stone, says: "I bet a million with Rothschild that it takes finally the left path." And, effectively, the leaf passed on the left side of the stone, but unfortunately for the fool Rothschild never said "I [will take that] bet".

=== Argument from inconsistent revelations ===
Since there have been many religions throughout history, and therefore many conceptions of God (or gods), some assert that all of them need to be factored into the wager, in an argumentation known as the argument from inconsistent revelations. This, its proponents argue, would lead to a high probability of believing in "the wrong god" and would eliminate the mathematical advantage Pascal claimed with his wager. Denis Diderot, a contemporary of Voltaire, expressed this opinion when asked about the wager, saying "an Imam could reason the same way". J. L. Mackie writes that "the church within which alone salvation is to be found is not necessarily the Church of Rome, but perhaps that of the Anabaptists or the Mormons or the Muslim Sunnis or the worshipers of Kali or of Odin."

Pascal considers this type of objection briefly in the notes compiled into the Pensées, and dismisses it:

What say [the unbelievers] then? "Do we not see," say they, "that the brutes live and die like men, and Turks like Christians? They have their ceremonies, their prophets, their doctors, their saints, their monks, like us," etc. If you care but little to know the truth, that is enough to leave you in repose. But if you desire with all your heart to know it, it is not enough; look at it in detail. That would be sufficient for a question in philosophy; but not here, where everything is at stake. And yet, after a superficial reflection of this kind, we go to amuse ourselves, etc. Let us inquire of this same religion whether it does not give a reason for this obscurity; perhaps it will teach it to us.

Pascal says that the skepticism of unbelievers who rest content with the many-religions objection has seduced them into a fatal "repose". If they were really bent on knowing the truth, they would be persuaded to examine "in detail" whether Christianity is like any other religion, but they just cannot be bothered. Their objection might be sufficient were the subject concerned merely some "question in philosophy", but not "here, where everything is at stake". In "a matter where they themselves, their eternity, their all are concerned", they can manage no better than "a superficial reflection" ("une reflexion légère") and, thinking they have scored a point by asking a leading question, they go off to amuse themselves.

As Pascal scholars observe, Pascal regarded the many-religions objection as a rhetorical ploy, a "trap" that he had no intention of falling into.

David Wetsel notes that Pascal's treatment of the pagan religions is brisk: "As far as Pascal is concerned, the demise of the pagan religions of antiquity speaks for itself. Those pagan religions which still exist in the New World, in India, and in Africa are not even worth a second glance. They are obviously the work of superstition and ignorance and have nothing in them which might interest "les gens habiles" ('clever men'). Islam warrants more attention, being distinguished from paganism (which for Pascal presumably includes all the other non-Christian religions) by its claim to be a revealed religion. Nevertheless, Pascal concludes that the religion founded by Mohammed can on several counts be shown to be devoid of divine authority, and that therefore, as a path to the knowledge of God, it is as much a dead end as paganism." Judaism, in view of its close links to Christianity, he deals with elsewhere.

The many-religions objection is taken more seriously by some later apologists of the wager, who argue that of the rival options only those awarding infinite happiness affect the wager's dominance. In the opinion of these apologists "finite, semi-blissful promises such as Kali's or Odin's" therefore drop out of consideration. Also, the infinite bliss that the rival conception of God offers has to be mutually exclusive. If Christ's promise of bliss can be attained concurrently with Jehovah's and Allah's (all three being identified as the God of Abraham), there is no conflict in the decision matrix in the case where the cost of believing in the wrong conception of God is neutral (limbo/purgatory/spiritual death), although this would be countered with an infinite cost in the case where not believing in the correct conception of God results in punishment (hell).

Ecumenical interpretations of the wager argue that it could even be suggested that believing in a generic God, or a god by the wrong name, is acceptable so long as that conception of God has similar essential characteristics of the conception of God considered in Pascal's wager (perhaps the God of Aristotle). Proponents of this line of reasoning suggest that either all of the conceptions of God or gods throughout history truly boil down to just a small set of "genuine options", or that if Pascal's wager can simply bring a person to believe in "generic theism", it has done its job.

Pascal argues implicitly for the uniqueness of Christianity in the wager itself, writing: "If there is a God, He is infinitely incomprehensible ... Who then can blame the Christians for not being able to give reasons for their beliefs, professing as they do a religion which they cannot explain by reason?"

=== Argument from inauthentic belief ===
Some critics argue that Pascal's wager, for those who cannot believe, suggests feigning belief to gain eternal reward. Richard Dawkins argues that this would be dishonest and immoral and that, in addition to this, it is absurd to think that God, being just and omniscient, would not see through this deceptive strategy on the part of the "believer", thus nullifying the benefits of the wager. William James in his 'Will to Believe' states that "We feel that a faith in masses and holy water adopted wilfully after such a mechanical calculation would lack the inner soul of faith's reality; and if we were ourselves in the place of the Deity, we should probably take particular pleasure in cutting off believers of this pattern from their infinite reward. It is evident that unless there be some pre-existing tendency to believe in masses and holy water, the option offered to the will by Pascal is not a living option".

Since these criticisms are concerned not with the validity of the wager itself, but with its possible aftermath—namely that a person who has been convinced of the overwhelming odds in favor of belief might still find themself unable to sincerely believe—they are tangential to the thrust of the wager. What such critics are objecting to is Pascal's subsequent advice to an unbeliever who, having concluded that the only rational way to wager is in favor of God's existence, points out, reasonably enough, that this by no means makes them a believer. This hypothetical unbeliever complains, "I am so made that I cannot believe. What would you have me do?" Pascal, far from suggesting that God can be deceived by outward show, says that God does not regard it at all: "God looks only at what is inward." For a person who is already convinced of the odds of the wager but cannot seem to put their heart into the belief, he offers practical advice.

Explicitly addressing the question of inability to believe, Pascal argues that if the wager is valid, the inability to believe is irrational, and therefore must be caused by feelings: "your inability to believe, because reason compels you to [believe] and yet you cannot, [comes] from your passions." This inability, therefore, can be overcome by diminishing these irrational sentiments: "Learn from those who were bound like you. ... Follow the way by which they began; by acting as if they believed, taking the holy water, having masses said, etc. Even this will naturally make you believe, and deaden your acuteness.—'But this is what I am afraid of.'—And why? What have you to lose?"

An uncontroversial doctrine in both Roman Catholic and Protestant theology is that mere belief in God is insufficient to attain salvation, the standard cite being James 2:19 (the following is from the KJV): "Thou believest that there is one God; thou doest well: the devils also believe, and tremble." Salvation requires "faith" not just in the sense of belief, but of trust and obedience. Pascal and his sister, a nun, were among the leaders of Roman Catholicism's Jansenist school of thought whose doctrine of salvation was close to Protestantism in emphasizing faith over works. Both Jansenists and Protestants followed St. Augustine in this emphasis (Martin Luther belonged to the Augustinian Order of monks). Augustine wrote:

So our faith has to be distinguished from the faith of the demons. Our faith, you see, purifies the heart, their faith makes them guilty. They act wickedly, and so they say to the Lord, "What have you to do with us?" When you hear the demons saying this, do you imagine they don't recognize him? "We know who you are," they say. "You are the Son of God" (Lk 4:34). Peter says this and he is praised for it; the demon says it, and is condemned. Why's that, if not because the words may be the same, but the heart is very different? So let us distinguish our faith, and see that believing is not enough. That's not the sort of faith that purifies the heart.

== Similar wagers ==
- The Christian apologist Arnobius of Sicca (d. 330) stated an early version of the argument in Against the Pagans, arguing "is it not more rational, of two things uncertain and hanging in doubtful suspense, rather to believe that which carries with it some hopes, than that which brings none at all?"
- A close parallel just before Pascal's time occurred in the Jesuit Antoine Sirmond's On the Immortality of the Soul (1635), which explicitly compared the choice of religion to playing dice and argued "However long and happy the space of this life may be, while ever you place it in the other pan of the balance against a blessed and flourishing eternity, surely it will seem to you ... that the pan will rise on high."

== Predecessors in other religions ==
- The sophist Protagoras had an agnostic position regarding the gods, but he nevertheless continued to worship the gods. This could be considered as an early version of the Wager.
- In the famous tragedy of Euripides Bacchae, Kadmos states an early version of Pascal's wager. It is noteworthy that at the end of the tragedy Dionysos, the god to whom Kadmos referred, appears and punishes him for thinking in this way. Euripides, quite clearly, considered and dismissed the wager in this tragedy.
- The stoic philosopher and Roman Emperor Marcus Aurelius expressed a similar sentiment in the second book of Meditations, saying "Since it is possible that thou mayest depart from life this very moment, regulate every act and thought accordingly. But to go away from among men, if there are gods, is not a thing to be afraid of, for the gods will not involve thee in evil; but if indeed they do not exist, or if they have no concern about human affairs, what is it to me to live in a universe devoid of gods or devoid of Providence?"
- The early Buddhist texts contain passages which defend a Buddhist wager argument for believing in an afterlife.
- In the Sanskrit classic Sārasamuccaya, Vararuci makes a similar argument to Pascal's wager.
- Muslim Imam Ja'far al-Sadiq is recorded to have postulated variations of the wager on several occasions in different forms, including his famed 'Tradition of the Myrobalan Fruit.' In the Shi'i hadith book al-Kafi, al-Sadiq declares to an atheist "If what you say is correct – and it is not – then we will both succeed. But if what I say is correct – and it is – then I will succeed, and you will be destroyed."
- An instantiation of this argument, within the Islamic kalam tradition, was discussed by Imam al-Haramayn al-Juwayni (d. 478/1085) in his Kitab al-irshad ila-qawati al-adilla fi usul al-i'tiqad, or A Guide to the Conclusive Proofs for the Principles of Belief.

== Contemporary views ==
- The Atheist's Wager, popularised by the philosopher Michael Martin and published in his 1990 book Atheism: A Philosophical Justification, is an atheistic wager argument in response to Pascal's wager.
- A 2008 philosophy book, How to Make Good Decisions and Be Right All the Time, presents a secular revision of Pascal's wager: "What does it hurt to pursue value and virtue? If there is value, then we have everything to gain, but if there is none, then we haven’t lost anything.... Thus, we should seek value."
- Pascal's mugging, a dialogue written by philosopher Nick Bostrom, shows that a rational victim can be made to give up his wallet in exchange for a weakly credible promise of astronomical repayment. As in Pascal's Wager, a small but certain downside is outweighed by a large but unlikely upside.
- Roko's basilisk is a hypothetical future superintelligence that punishes everyone who failed to help bring it into existence.
- In a 2014 article, philosopher Justin McBrayer argued we ought to remain agnostic about the existence of God but nonetheless believe because of the good that comes in the present life from believing in God. "The gist of the renewed wager is that theists do better than non-theists regardless of whether or not God exists."
- The wager has been analogized to decisions about climate change. Two differences from Pascal's wager are posited regarding climate change: first, climate change is more likely than Pascal's God to exist, as there is scientific evidence for one but not the other. Secondly, the calculated penalty for unchecked climate change would be large, but is not generally considered to be infinite. Magnate Warren Buffett claimed that climate change "bears a similarity to Pascal's Wager on the Existence of God. Pascal, it may be recalled, argued that if there were only a tiny probability that God truly existed, it made sense to behave as if He did because the rewards could be infinite whereas the lack of belief risked eternal misery. Likewise, if there is only a 1% chance the planet is heading toward a truly major disaster and delay means passing a point of no return, inaction now is foolhardy."

== See also ==
- A Confession
- Christian existential apologetics
- Ecclesiastes
- Eschatological verification
- Four Assurances
