= Atheist's wager =

Argument as to whether a good life with a positive legacy necessitates existence of God

The Atheist's wager, coined by the philosopher Michael Martin and published in his 1990 book Atheism: A Philosophical Justification, is an atheistic response to Pascal's wager regarding the existence of God.

One version of the Atheist's wager suggests that since a kind and loving god would reward good deeds – and that if no gods exist, good deeds would still leave a positive legacy – one should live a good life without religion. This argument assumes that if a god exists, they are benevolent and just, rather than arbitrary or punitive in their judgment of human actions. This contrasts with Pascal's wager, which presumes a god who rewards belief and punishes disbelief regardless of moral conduct. Philosophers such as J. L. Schellenberg have argued that a perfectly just deity would be more likely to reward sincere moral behavior and intellectual honesty rather than belief for its own sake. Another formulation suggests that a god may reward honest disbelief and punish a dishonest belief in the divine.

== Explanation ==
Martin's wager states that if one were to analyze one's options in regard to how to live one's life, one would arrive at the following possibilities:

- One may live a good life and believe in a god, and a benevolent god exists, in which case one goes to heaven: one's gain is infinite.
- One may live a good life without believing in a god, and a benevolent god exists, in which case one goes to heaven: your gain is infinite.
- One may live a good life and believe in a god, but no benevolent god exists, in which case one leaves a positive legacy to the world; one's gain is finite.
- One may live a good life without believing in a god, and no benevolent god exists, in which case one leaves a positive legacy to the world; one's gain is finite.
- One may live an evil life and believe in a god, and a benevolent god exists, in which case one goes to hell: one's loss is infinite.
- One may live an evil life without believing in a god, and a benevolent god exists, in which case one goes to hell: one's loss is infinite.
- One may live an evil life and believe in a god, but no benevolent god exists, in which case one leaves a negative legacy to the world; one's loss is finite.
- One may live an evil life without believing in a god, and no benevolent god exists, in which case one leaves a negative legacy to the world; one's loss is finite.

The following table shows the values assigned to each possible outcome:

| | A benevolent god exists | | No benevolent god exists | |
| | Belief in god (B) | No belief in god (¬B) | Belief in god (B) | No belief in god (¬B) |
|---|---|---|---|---|
| Good life (L) | +∞ (heaven) | +∞ (heaven) | +X (positive legacy) | +X (positive legacy) |
| Evil life (¬L) | −∞ (hell) | −∞ (hell) | −X (negative legacy) | −X (negative legacy) |

Given these values, Martin argues that the option to live a good life clearly dominates the option of living an evil life, regardless of belief in a god. Whether one believes in god has no effect on the outcome.
