= Nicholas Everitt =

English philosopher and atheist writer

- Born: 21 October 1943 (age 81)
- Occupation(s): Philosopher, writer

Nicholas Everitt (born 21 October 1943) is an English philosopher and atheist writer who specializes in epistemology and philosophy of religion.

== Biography ==
Everitt obtained his degree in Moral Science from University of Cambridge and a postgraduate degree from University of Oxford. He was Senior Lecturer in Philosophy at the University of East Anglia and taught briefly at Fairfield University and Ngee Ann Polytechnic. He taught for the Open University as an Associate Lecturer and after retirement currently teaches the AA308 course, "Thought and Experience – Themes in the Philosophy of Mind" and "The Existence of God" for the Department of Continuing Education at Lancaster University.

Everitt is an atheist and his best known work is The Non-Existence of God, published by Routledge in 2003. Everitt argues that the divine attributes of God (omniscience, omnipotence, omnipresence, omnibenevolence) in traditional theism are individually self-contradictory or cannot be co-instantiated. The book contains criticisms of all the standard theistic arguments (cosmological, ontological, moral, teleological). It was positively reviewed in academic journals.

== Selected publications ==
- Modern Epistemology: A New Introduction (with Alec Fisher, 1995)
- The Non-Existence of God (2003)
- The Argument from Imperfection (2006)
