= Michael Lou Martin =

American philosopher (1932–2015)

- Born: February 3, 1932
- Died: May 27, 2015 (aged 83)

Education
- Education: Arizona State University (BS); University of Arizona (MA); Harvard University (PhD)
- Thesis: Psychoanalysis and Scientific Methodology (1962)

Philosophical work
- Era: Contemporary philosophy
- Region: Western philosophy
- School: Analytic philosophy
- Main interests: Philosophy of social science; Philosophy of law; Philosophy of religion; Negative atheism
- Notable works: The Impossibility of God (2003); Atheism, Morality and Meaning (2002); The Case Against Christianity (1991); Atheism: A Philosophical Justification (1989)
- Notable ideas: The transcendental argument for the nonexistence of God, Pascal's wager as an argument for not believing in God, negative and positive atheism

Michael Lou Martin (February 3, 1932 – May 27, 2015) was an American philosopher and former professor at Boston University. Martin specialized in the philosophy of religion, although he also worked on the philosophies of science, law, and social science. He served with the US Marine Corps in Korea.

== Life and academic career ==
Martin graduated from Arizona State University with a Bachelor of Science in business administration in 1956. He earned a Master of Arts in philosophy from the University of Arizona in 1958, then earned his Ph.D. in philosophy from Harvard University in 1962. He was appointed assistant professor at University of Colorado in 1962 and in 1965 he moved to Boston University. He was appointed Professor of Philosophy Emeritus after a lifelong career at Boston University. Martin died on 27 May 2015, aged 83.

=== Debates ===
Martin took part in a number of written and internet debates with Christian philosophers.

- In 1991 Martin and Keith Parsons (founder of Georgia Skeptics and teacher of philosophy at Berry College (Rome, Georgia)) provided atheistic critiques to Douglas Jones' propositions on The Futility of Non Christian Thought in a written debate, Is Non-Christian Thought Justifiable?, originally published in Antithesis magazine.
- On November 26, 1994 Martin withdrew from a debate with Christian apologist Greg Bahnsen at Rhodes College in Memphis, Tennessee. The sponsor of the debate Marty Fields, the director of College Ministries at Second Presbyterian Church, explained to a school reporter that "Martin refused to debate upon learning that Bahnsen would tape the event and sell copies through his Christian ministry. ...Martin was reluctant to participate in anything that would raise money for a religious organization." Bahnsen framed the withdraw as Martin lacking "confidence in the public defense of atheism." And that "sightings of Elvis are more common than sightings of my opponent." He set up an empty chair for Martin, and went on to record a lecture entitled the "Debate that Never Was".
- He conducted a debate with John M. Frame over the internet in a series of articles and responses around Martin's 1996 article, "The Transcendental Argument for the Nonexistence of God".
- An internet debate with Christian philosopher Phil Fernandes in 1997 over the existence of God was published as a book in 2000 titled: Theism vs. Atheism: The Internet Debate.

== Views ==
=== Atheism ===
In his Atheism: A Philosophical Justification, Martin cites a general absence of an atheistic response to contemporary work in philosophy of religion, and accepts the responsibility of a rigorous defense of non belief as his "cross to bear:"

The aim of this book is not to make atheism a popular belief or even to overcome its invisibility. My object is not utopian. It is merely to provide good reasons for being an atheist. … My object is to show that atheism is a rational position and that belief in God is not. I am quite aware that atheistic beliefs are not always based on reason. My claim is that they should be.

Martin used the concepts of negative and positive atheism as proposed by Antony Flew rather than the terms weak or soft atheism (negative) and strong or hard atheism (positive).

== Works ==
He is the author or editor of a number of books, including Atheism: A Philosophical Justification (1989), The Case Against Christianity (1991), Atheism, Morality, and Meaning (2002), The Impossibility of God (2003), The Improbability of God (2006), and The Cambridge Companion to Atheism (2006). He sat on the editorial board of the philosophy journal Philo and wrote many reviews and articles for journals and magazines including Free Inquiry.

=== Academic books ===
- Martin, Michael; Augustine, Keith (2015). The Myth of an Afterlife: The Case against Life After Death. Rowman & Littlefield. ISBN 978-0-8108-8677-3.
- Martin, Michael (2006). The Cambridge Companion to Atheism. Cambridge University Press. ISBN 978-0521603676. (Translated into Portuguese (2007), Finnish (2011), Croatian (2011))
- Martin, Michael; Monnier, Ricki (2006). The Improbability of God. Prometheus Books. ISBN 978-1591023814.
- Martin, Michael; Monnier, Ricki (2003). The Impossibility of God. Amherst, NY: Prometheus Books. ISBN 978-1591021209.
- Martin, Michael (2002). Atheism, Morality and Meaning. Amherst, NY: Prometheus Books. ISBN 978-1573929875.
- Fernandes, Phil; Martin, Michael (2000). Theism vs. Atheism: The Internet Debate (Dr. Phil Fernandes vs. Dr. Michael Martin). Brenerton, WA: Ibd Press. ISBN 978-0965648622.
- Martin, Michael (2000). Verstehen: The Uses of Understanding in the Social Sciences. New Jersey: Transaction Books. ISBN 978-0765800039.
- Martin, Michael (1996). Legal Realism: American and Scandinavian. New York: Peter Lang. ISBN 978-0820434629.
- Martin, Michael; McIntyre, Lee (1994). Readings in the Philosophy of Social Science. Cambridge: The MIT Press. ISBN 978-0262631518.
- Martin, Michael (1991). The Case Against Christianity. Philadelphia: Temple University. ISBN 978-1566390811.
- Martin, Michael (1989). Atheism: A Philosophical Justification. Philadelphia: Temple University. ISBN 978-0877229438.
- Martin, Michael (1987). The Legal Philosophy of H. L. A. Hart: A Critical Appraisal. Philadelphia: Temple University Press. ISBN 978-0877224716.
- Martin, Michael (1978). Social Science and Philosophical Analysis: Essays on The Philosophy of The Social Sciences. Washington, D.C.: University Press Of America. ISBN 978-0819104786.
- Martin, Michael (1972). Concepts of Science Education: A Philosophical Analysis. Chicago: Scott-Foresman. ISBN 978-0819144799.
- Martin, Michael; Foster, Malcolm (1966). Probability, Confirmation and Simplicity. New York: Odyssey Press. ASIN B000H03Q86.

=== Fiction and plays ===
Martin published The Big Domino in the Sky: And Other Atheistic Tales in 1996. This is a collection of short stories in various styles presenting philosophical arguments. ISBN 978-1573921114.

In 2011 Martin self-published a fiction novel, Murder In Lecture Hall B, about a murder in the classroom of a philosophy professor whose interests are Religions and Atheism. ISBN 978-1466310063

Martin also wrote 8 short plays with moral or philosophical themes that are available on his website.

== See also ==
- Atheist's Wager
- American philosophy
- List of American philosophers
- List of atheist philosophers
